= 1750–1775 in Western fashion =

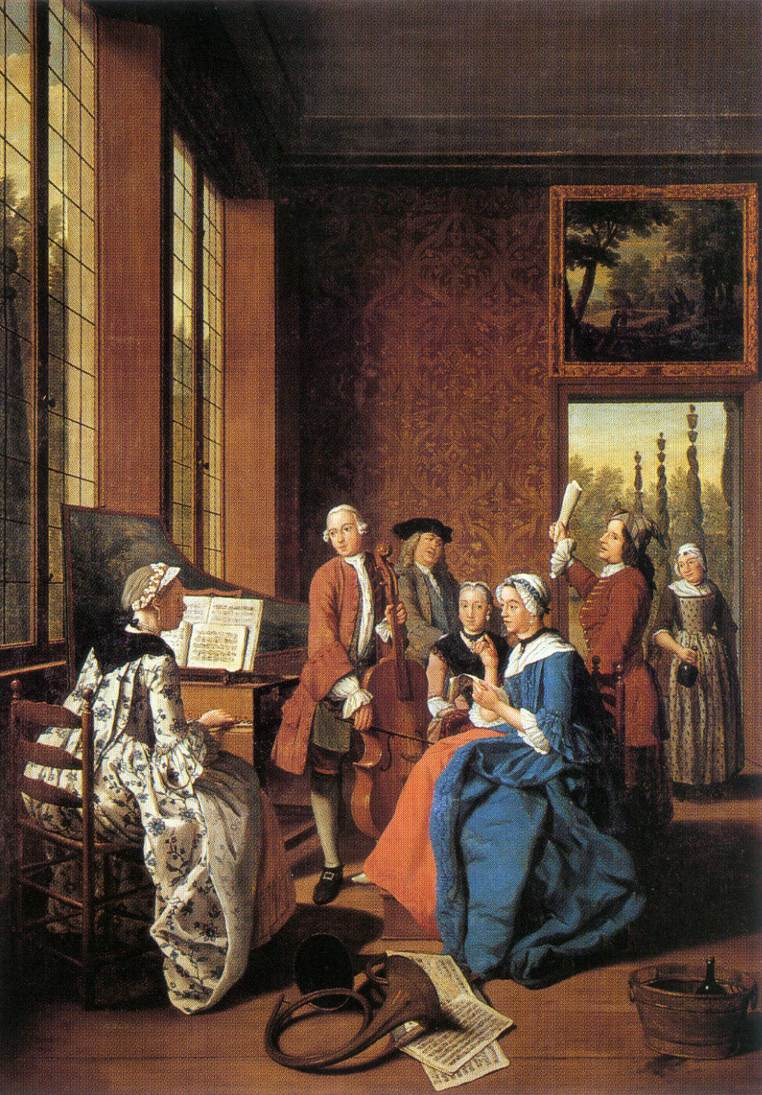
A Concert in an Interior by Jan Josef Horemans the Younger of Antwerp, 1764. The women's sack-back gowns and the men's coats over long waistcoats are characteristic of this period.

Fashion in the years 1750–1775 in European countries and the colonial Americas was characterised by greater abundance, elaboration and intricacy in clothing designs, loved by the Rococo artistic trends of the period. The French and English styles of fashion were very different from one another. French style was defined by elaborate court dress, colourful and rich in decoration, worn by such iconic fashion figures as Marie Antoinette.

After reaching their maximum size in the 1750s, hoop skirts began to reduce in size, but remained being worn with the most formal dresses, and were sometimes replaced with side-hoops, or panniers. Hairstyles were equally elaborate, with tall headdresses the distinctive fashion of the 1770s. For men, waistcoats and breeches of previous decades continued to be fashionable.

English style was defined by simple practical garments, made of inexpensive and durable fabrics, catering to a leisurely outdoor lifestyle. These lifestyles were also portrayed through the differences in portraiture. The French preferred indoor scenes where they could demonstrate their affinity for luxury in dress and lifestyle. The English, on the other hand, were more "egalitarian" in tastes, thus their portraits tended to depict the sitter in outdoor scenes and pastoral attire.

== Changes in fashion in the period ==
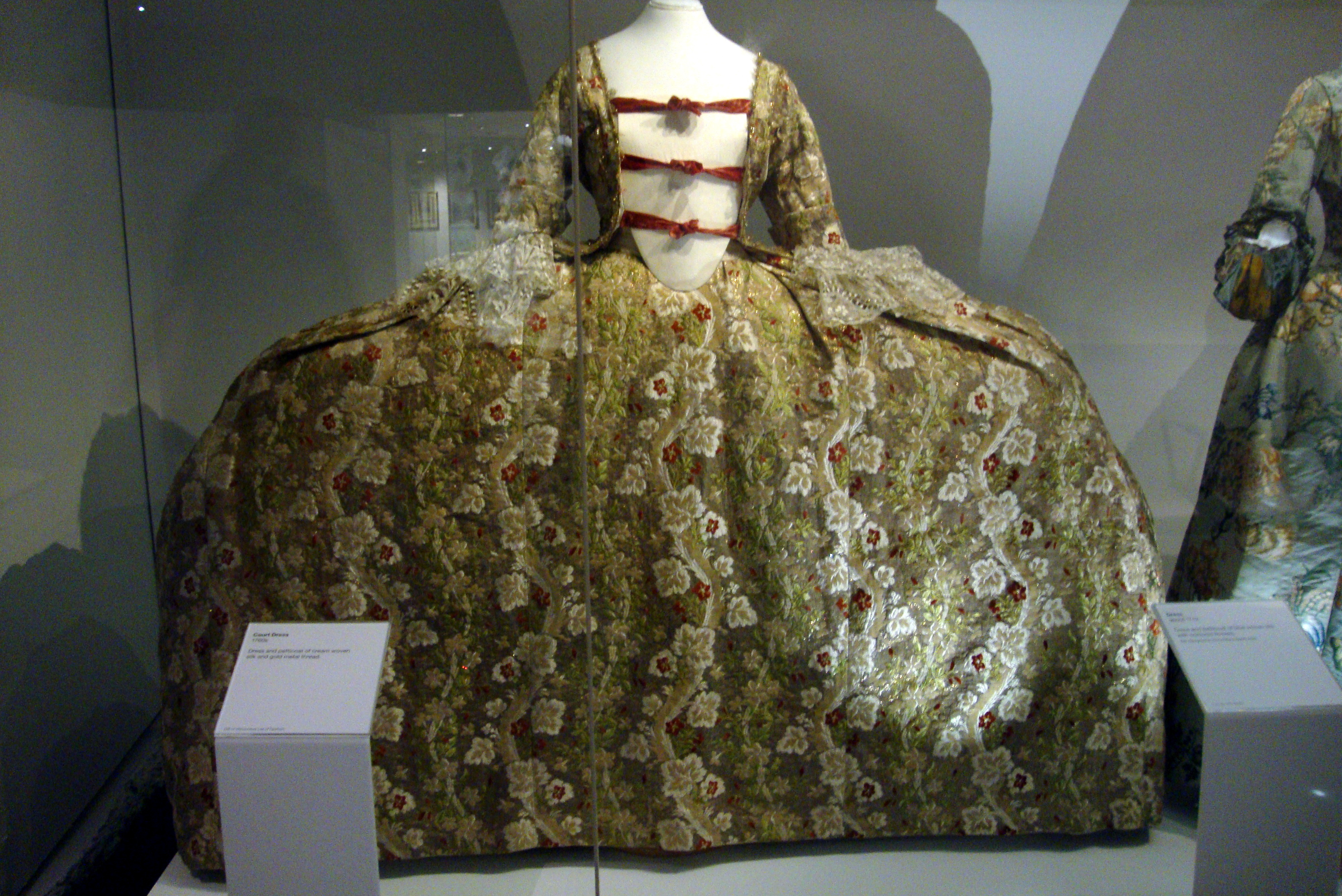
English or French court dress, c. 1760, with wide panniers. Taken at the Fashion Museum in Bath, England.

=== 1750s ===
- Women: Court dress included elaborate and intricate styles influenced by Rococo; hoop skirts; panniers; corsets; petticoats; stays; conical torso shape with large hips; "standardized courtly bodies and faces" with little individuality
  - French: Elaborate court dress, colorful, decorative, portraiture inside
  - English: Simple and practical, inexpensive durable fabrics, outdoor lifestyle, portraiture outside
- Men: Coat; waistcoat; breeches; large cuffs; more attention on individual pieces of the suit; wigs for formal occasions; long and powdered hair

=== 1760s ===
- Women: New strapless stays cut high at the armpit; grand habit de cour or "stiff-bodied" gown; riding habit
- Men: Frock coat; knee length breeches fitted snugly; full shirt sleeves; original Macaroni

=== 1770s ===
- Women: robe à la française or sack-back gown; robe à l'anglaise or close-bodied gown; the "Brunswick"; tall hair and headdresses
- Men: Waistcoats began to shorten; Macaroni imitators

== Women's fashion ==
=== Overview ===
Princess Henriette of France in court dress playing the viola de gamba, c. 1750–52, by Jean-Marc Nattier

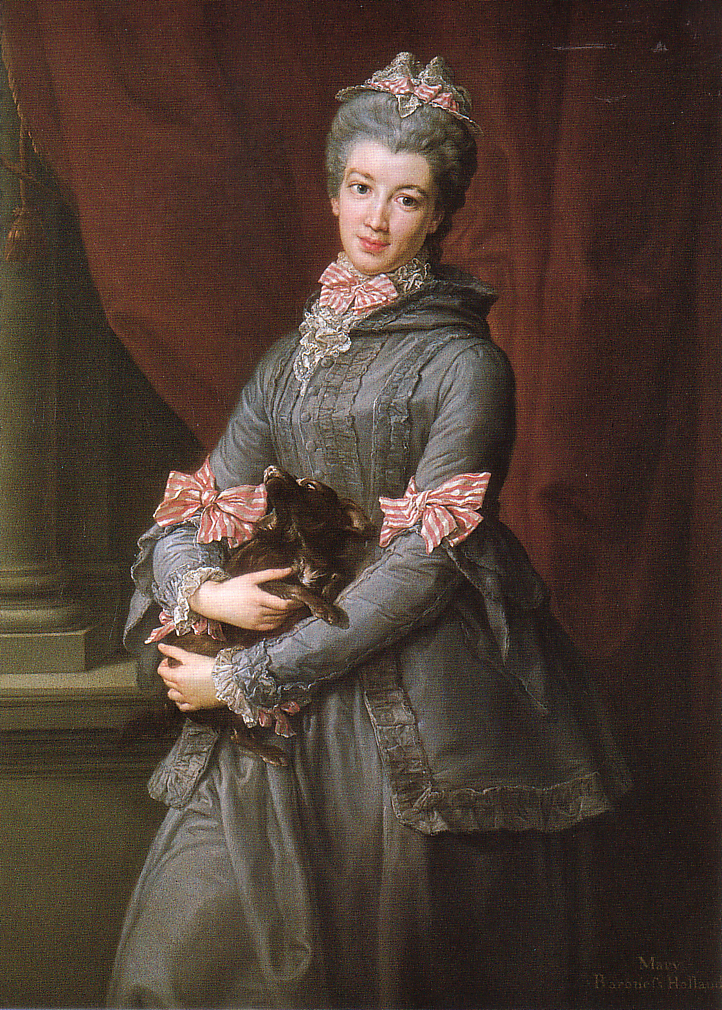
Lady Mary Fox wears a grey silk hooded Brunswick gown with striped ribbon ornaments, 1767

Women's clothing styles emphasized a narrow, inverted conical torso, achieved with boned stays, above full skirts. Hoop skirts continued to be worn, reaching their largest size in the 1750s, and were sometimes replaced by side-hoops, also called 'false hips', or panniers. Full-size hoop skirts prevented sitting while stays forced a proper standing posture. Garments like these could not be washed often because of the fabrics from which they were made. The Enlightenment produced a backlash against sumptuary laws which asserted a stagnant social hierarchy. During the Enlightenment, court dress stayed almost the same while outside of court dress, fashion became less extravagant and shifted more towards comfort rather than courtly display.

=== Gowns ===
The usual fashion of the years 1750–1775 was a low-necked gown (usually called a robe), worn over a petticoat. Most gowns had skirts that opened in front to show the petticoat worn beneath. If the bodice of the gown was open in front, the opening was filled in with a decorative stomacher, pinned to the gown over the laces or to the stays beneath.

Close-fitting sleeves just past the elbow were trimmed with frills or ruffles, and separate under-ruffles of lace or fine linen (Note: Known in modern usage as engageantes) were tacked to either the inside of the gown's sleeves, or to the shift or chemise sleeves. The neckline was trimmed with a fabric or lace ruffle, or a neckerchief called a fichu could be tucked into the low neckline. Women would also sometimes wear a neckerchief or a more formal lace modesty piece, particularly on low-cut dresses.

The robe à la française or sack-back gown featured back pleats hanging loosely from the neckline. A fitted bodice held the front of the gown closely to the figure.

The robe à l'anglaise or close-bodied gown featured back pleats sewn in place to fit closely to the body, and then released into the skirt which would be draped in various ways.

The Brunswick dress was a two-piece costume of German origin consisting of a hip-length jacket with "split sleeves"—flounced elbow-length sleeves and long, tight lower sleeves—and a hood, worn with a matching petticoat. It was popular for traveling.

Court dress, the grand habit de cour or "stiff-bodied" gown, retained the styles of the 1670s. It featured a low, oval neckline that bared the shoulders, and the heavily boned bodice laced closed in back, unlike the front-opening robe. The elbow-length sleeves were covered with tiers of lace flounces, echoing the full-sleeved chemise worn with the original style.

Front-wrapping thigh-length "shortgowns" or bedgowns of lightweight printed cotton fabric were fashionable at-home morning wear, worn with petticoats. Over time, bedgowns became the staple upper garment of British and American female working-class street wear.

As in previous periods, the traditional riding habit consisted of a tailored jacket like a man's coat, worn with a high-necked shirt, a waistcoat, a petticoat, and a hat. Alternatively, the jacket and a false waistcoat-front might be a made as a single garment, and later in the period a simpler riding jacket and petticoat—without waistcoat—could be worn.

=== Underwear ===
The shift, chemise (in France), or smock, had a low neckline and elbow-length sleeves which were full early in the period and became increasingly narrow as the century progressed. Drawers had been worn by at least some women since 1665.

The long-waisted, heavily boned "stays" of the early 1740s with their narrow back, wide front, and shoulder straps gave way by the 1760s to strapless stays which still were cut high at the armpit, to encourage a woman to stand with her shoulders slightly back, a fashionable posture. The fashionable shape was a rather conical torso, with large hips. The waist was not particularly small. Stays were laced snugly, but comfortably. They offered back support for heavy lifting, and poor and middle-class women were able to work comfortably in them.

Free-hanging pockets were tied around the waist and were accessed through "pocket slits" in the side-seams of the gown or petticoat.

Woollen or quilted waistcoats were worn over the stays and under the gown for warmth, as were petticoats quilted with wool batting, especially in the cold climates of northern Europe and America. In the 1770s stays began to be produced so they would end higher on a woman's body. Phillip Vicker complained: "For the late importation of Stays which are said to be now most fashionable in London, are produced upwards so high that we can have scarce any view at all of the Ladies Snowy Bosoms".

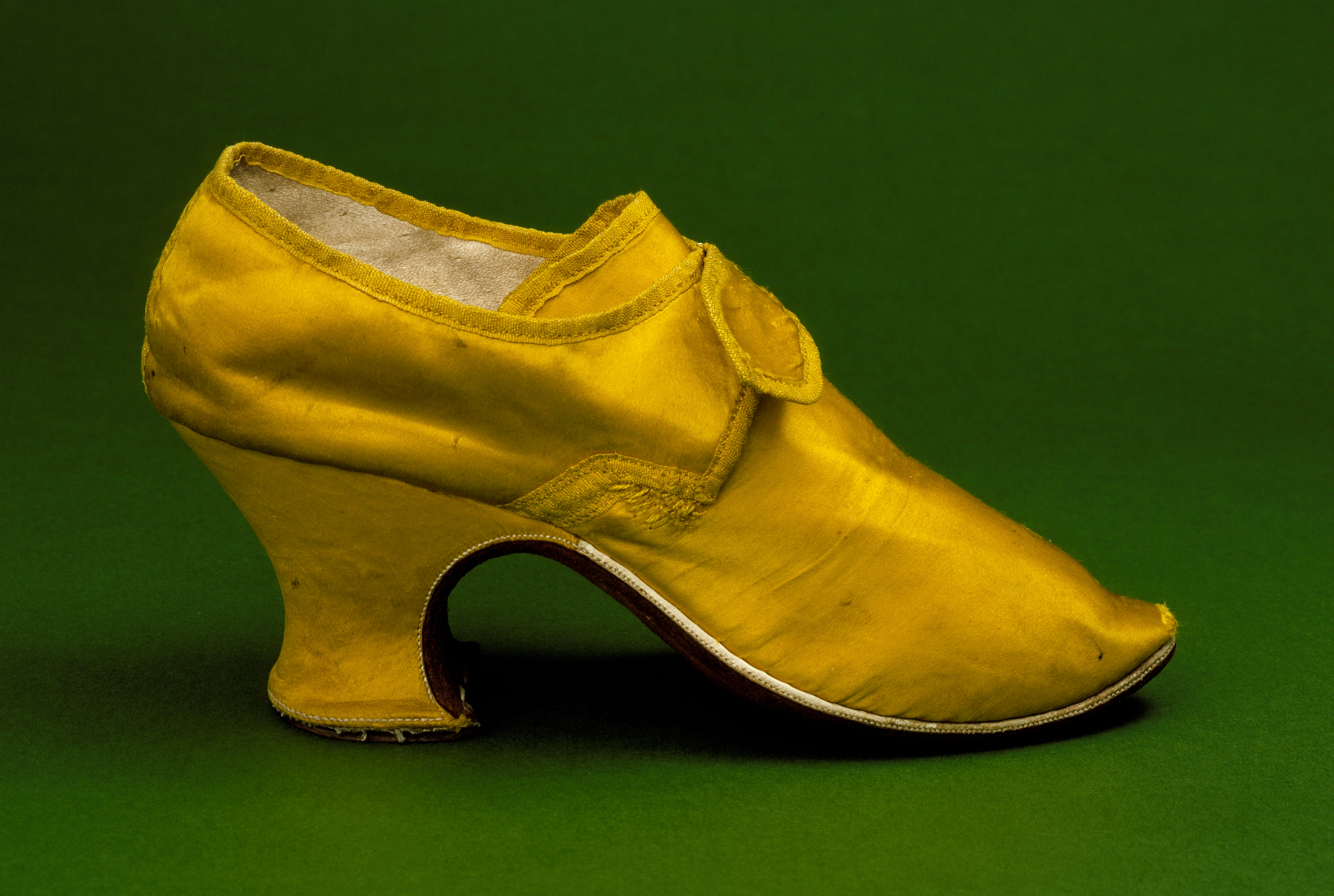
Woman's yellow silk shoe to be worn with shoe buckle, c. 1760–65

=== Shoes ===
Shoes had high, curved heels—the origin of modern "louis heels"—and were made of fabric or leather, with separate shoe buckles. These were either shiny metal, usually in silver—sometimes with the metal cut into false stones in the Paris style—or with paste stones, although there were other types.

=== Hairstyles and headgear ===
By the 1770s extreme hairstyles and wigs had come into fashion. Women wore their hair high upon their heads, in large plumes. To create tall extreme hair, rolls of horse hair, tow, or wool were used to raise up the front of the hair. The front of the hair was then frizzed out, or arranged in roll curls and set horizontally on the head. Women turned their hair up in the back often in a knot. In addition, pomatum and false hair was used to give more height to the hair. Pomatum was paste that women used to stiffen their hair. Pomatum was also used to hold powder, which women put in their hair. The Pomatum was made of many ingredients including hog's grease, tallow, or a mix of beef marrow and oil.

=== Women's style gallery ===
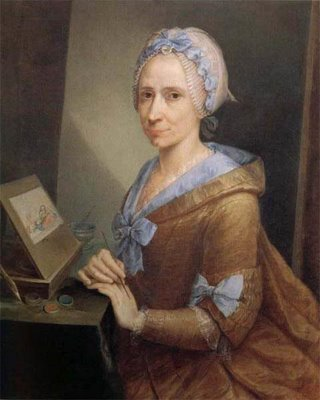
1 – c. 1750

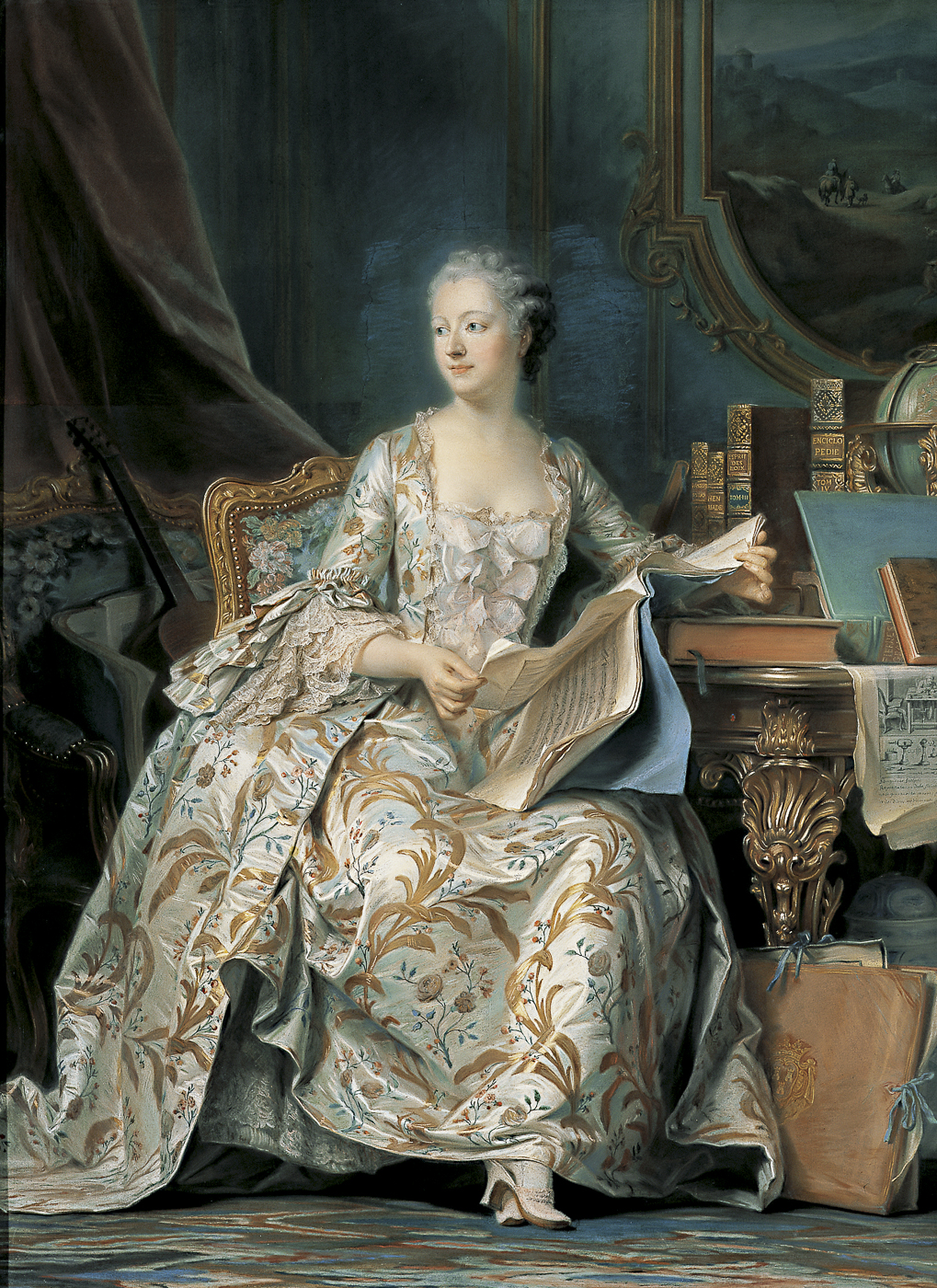
2 – 1755

3 – 1759

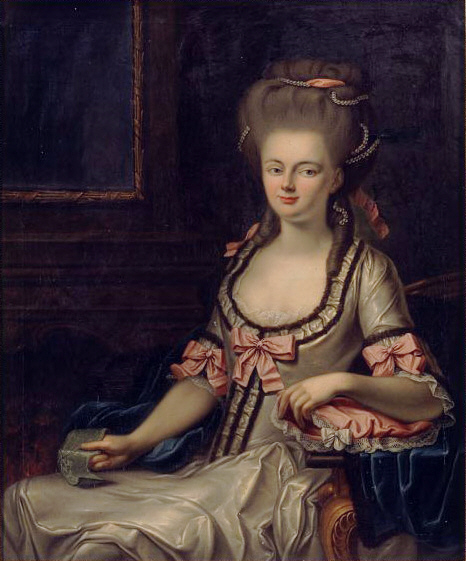
4 – 1760

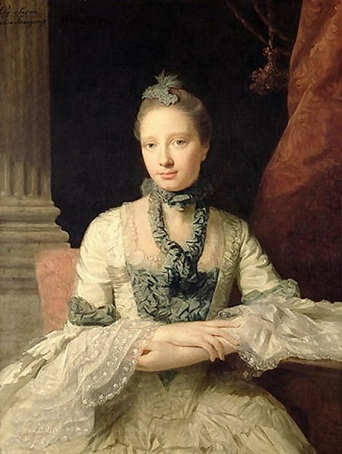
5 – 1761

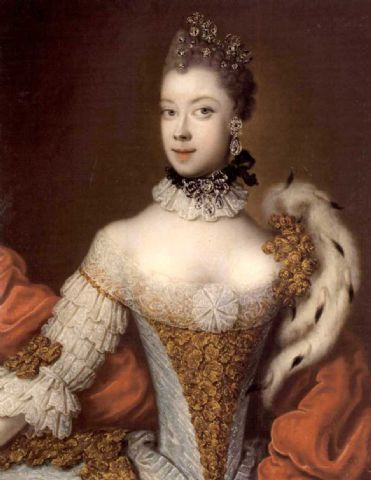
6 – 1761

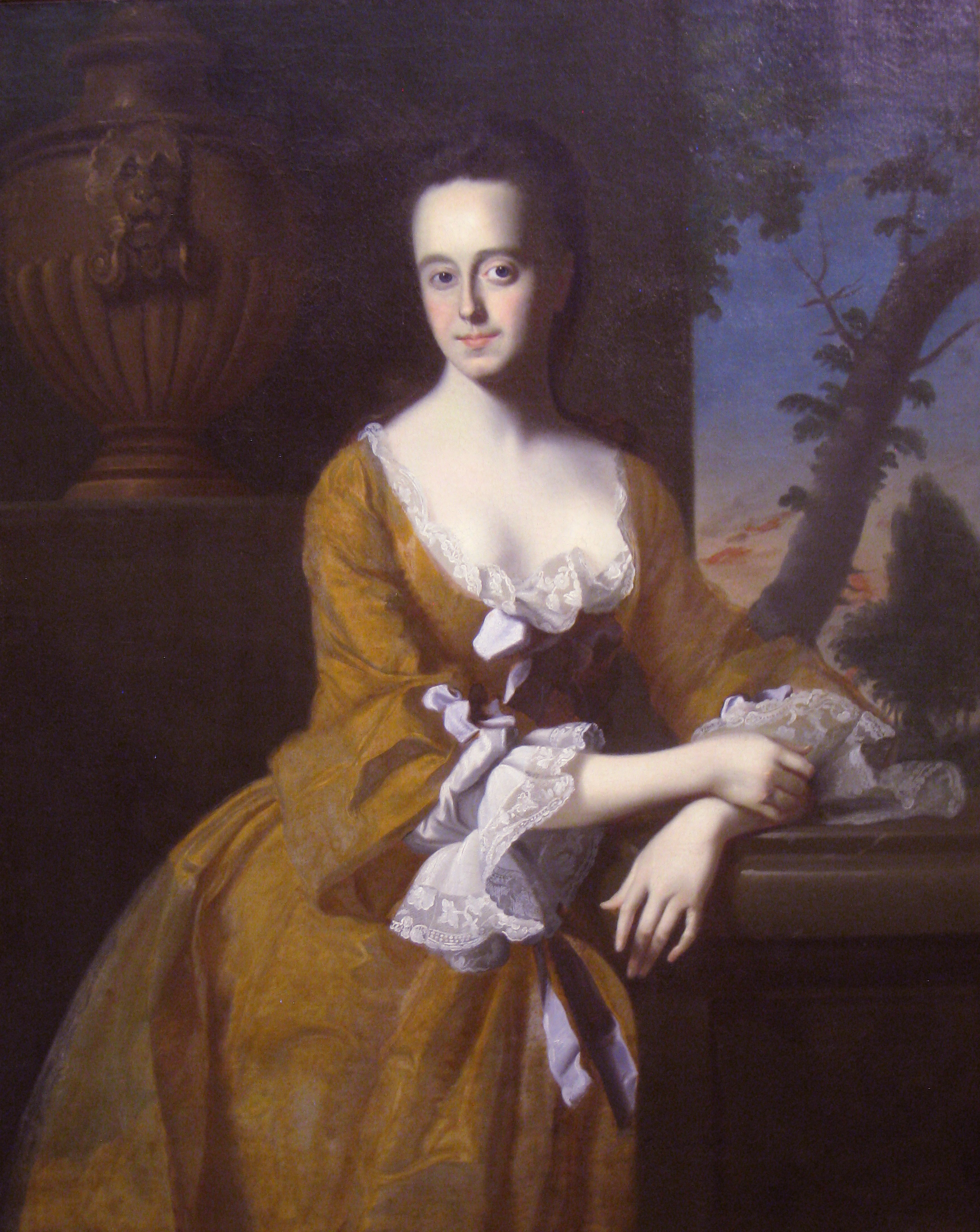
7 – 1763

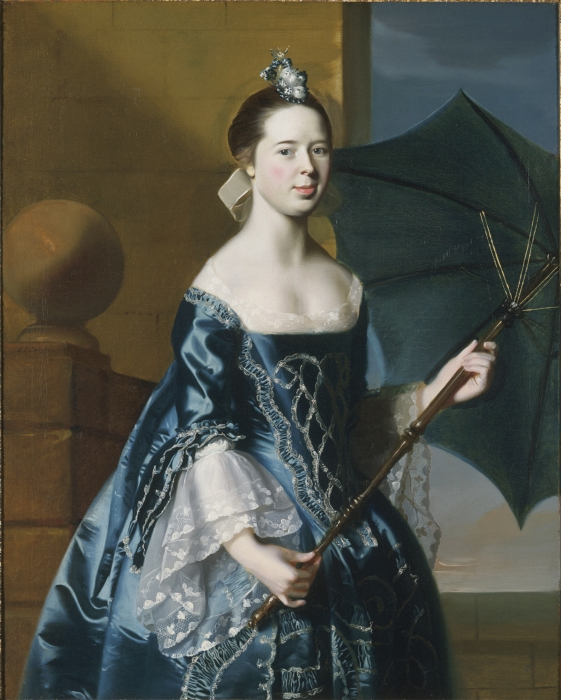
8 – 1763

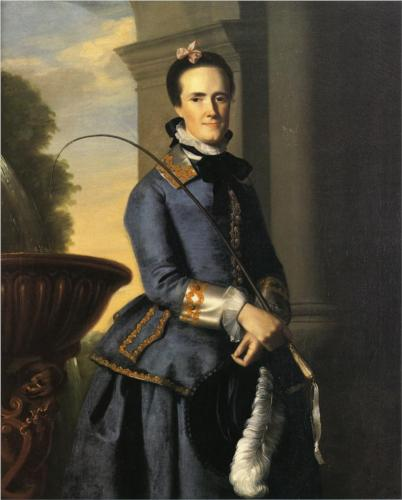
9 – 1764

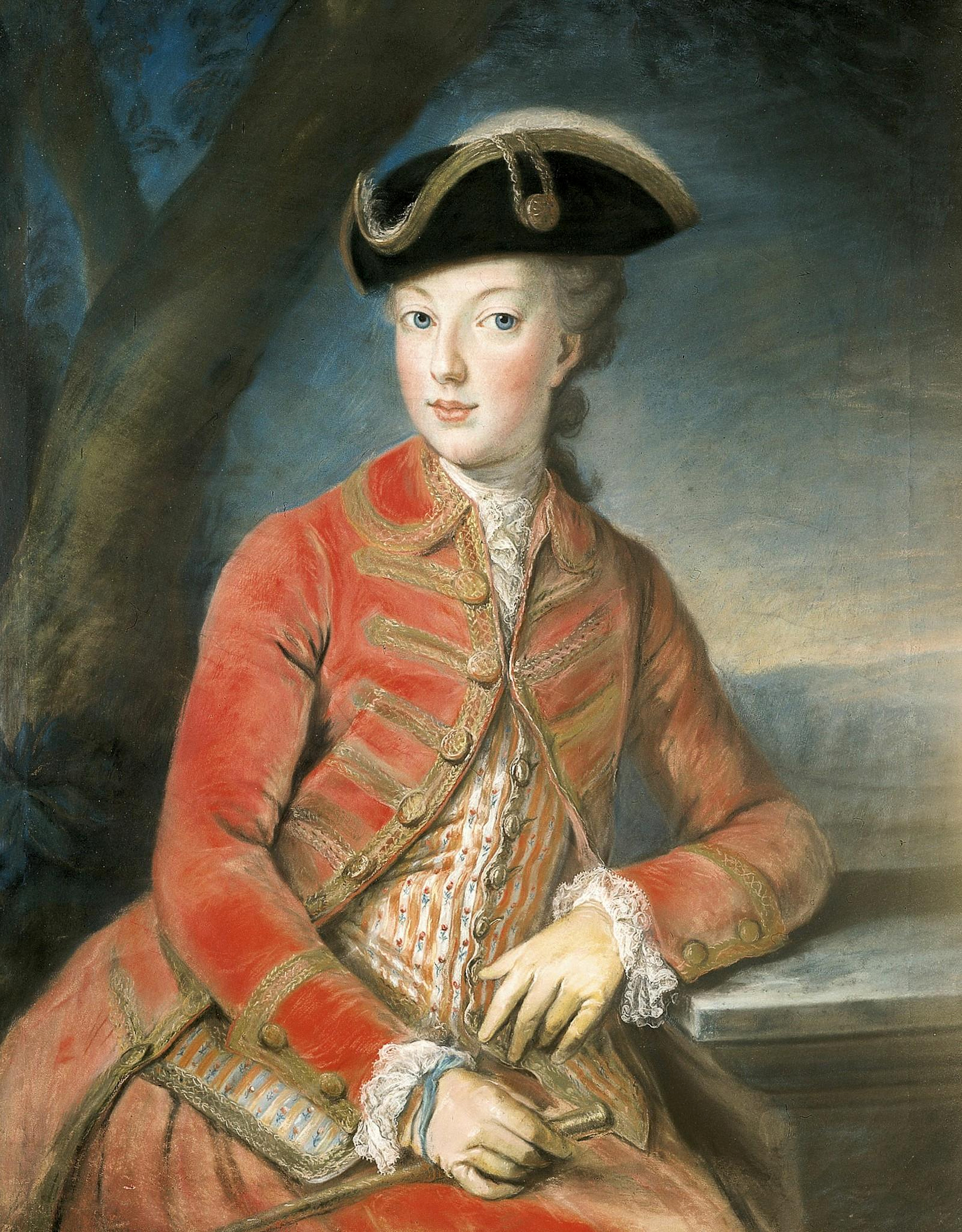
10 – 1771

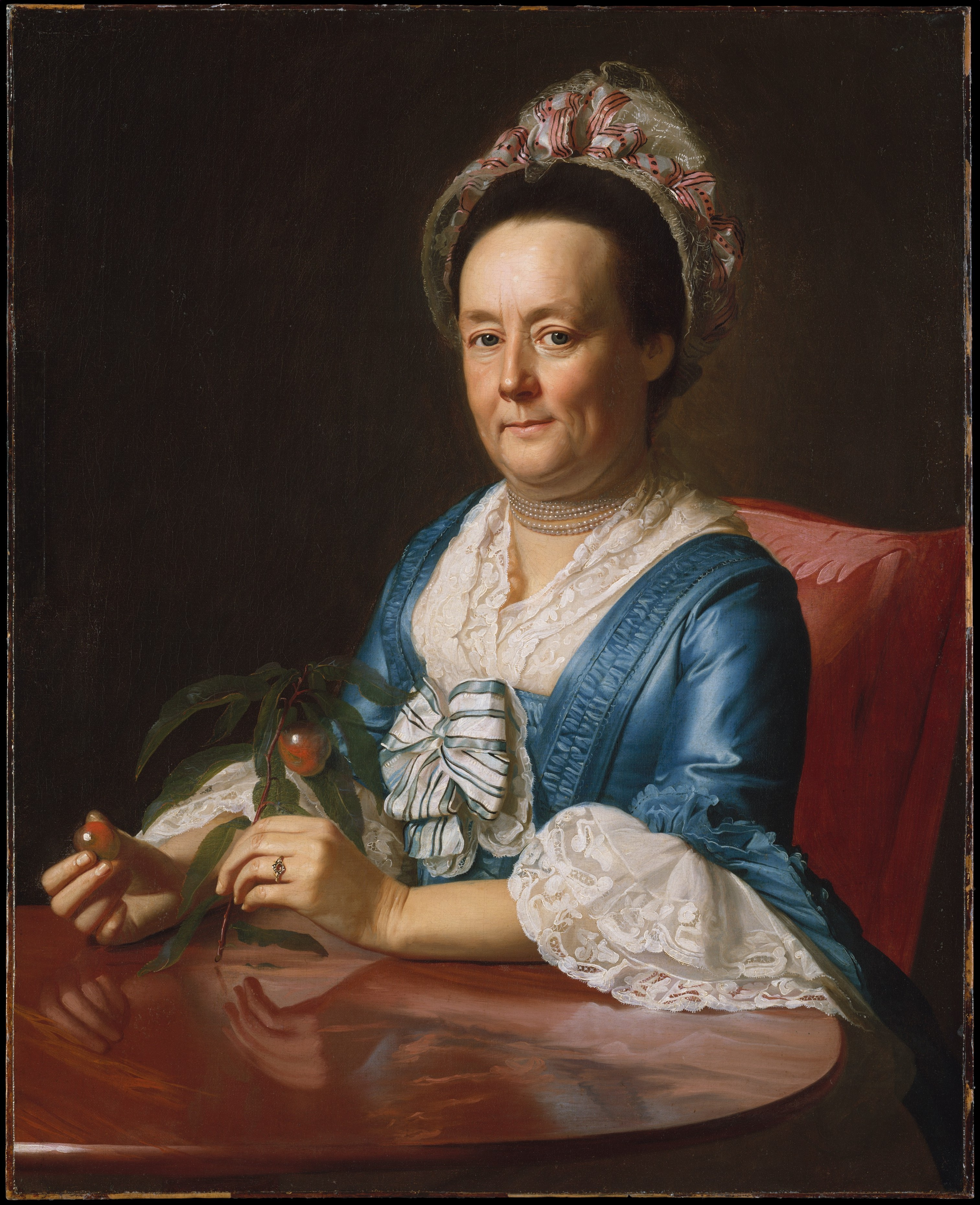
11 – 1773

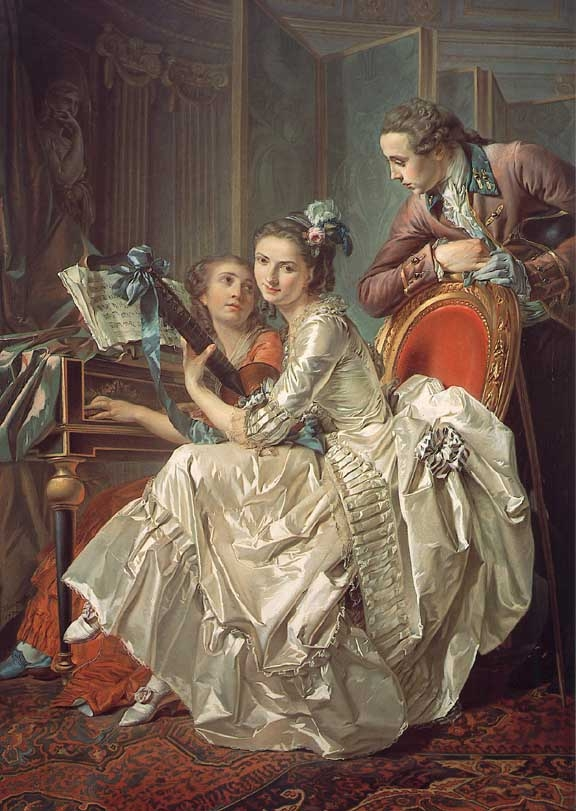
12 – 1774

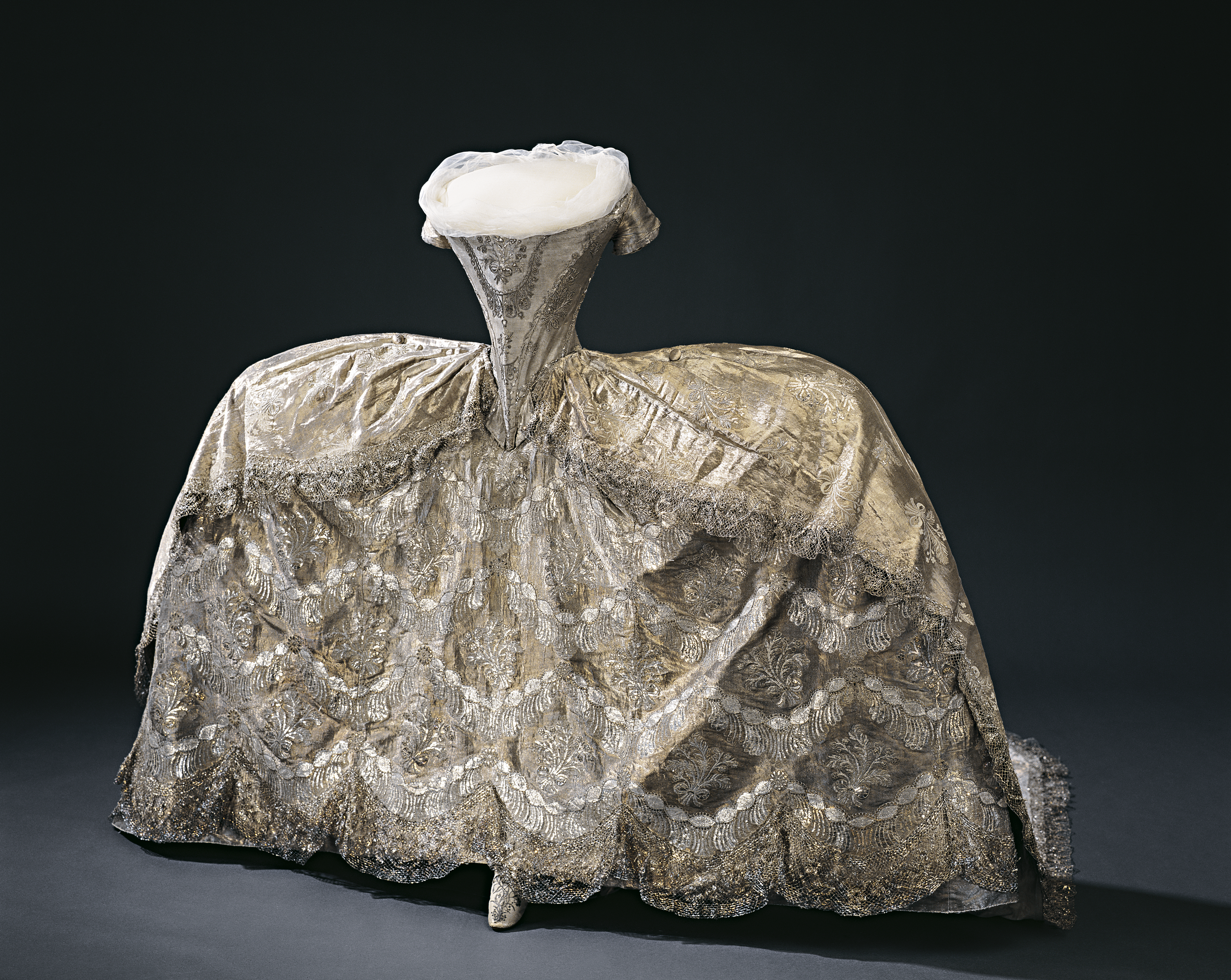
13 – 1774

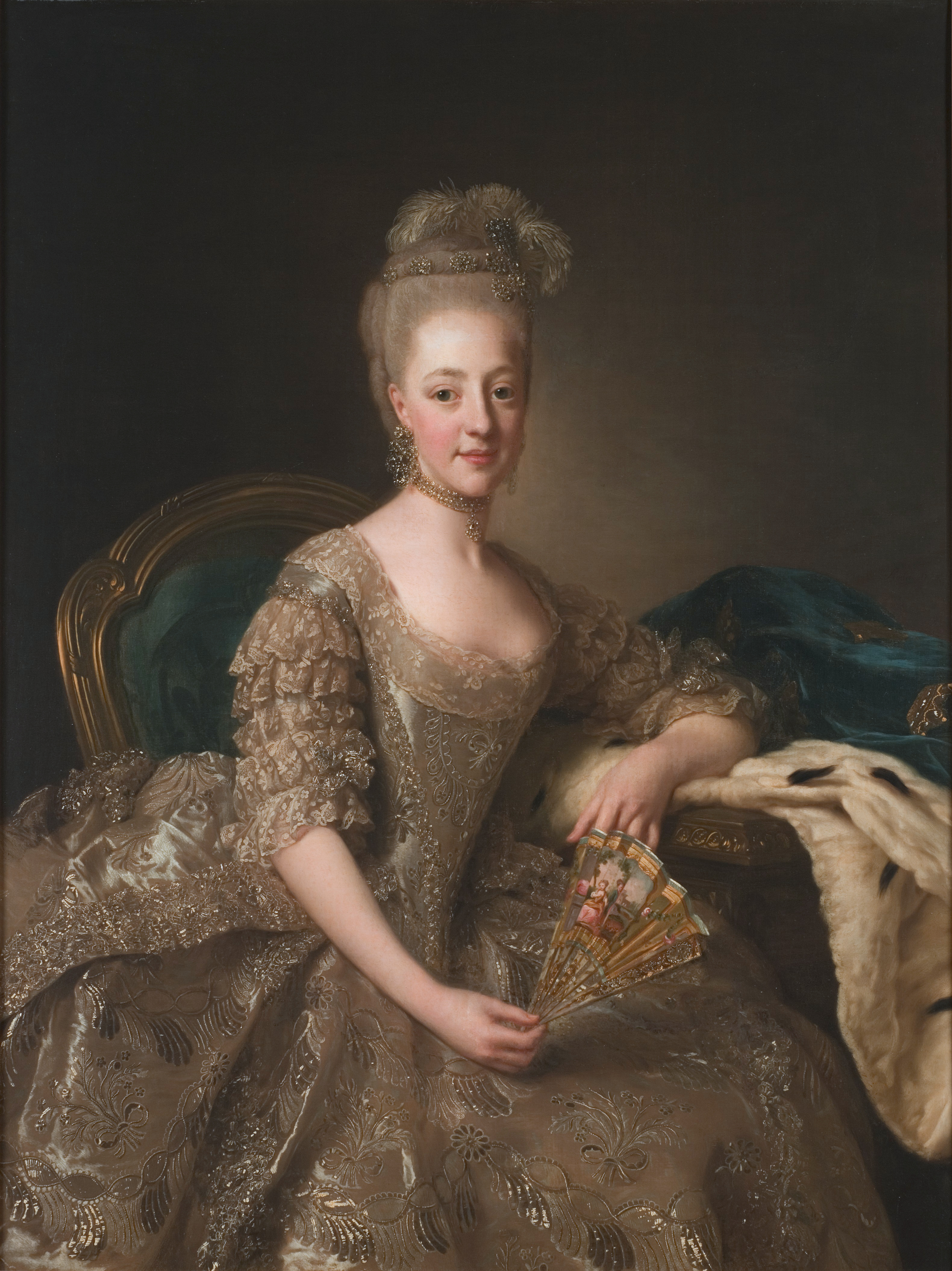
14 – 1774
1. Self-portrait of Anna Bacherini Piattoli wearing a Brunswick.
2. A 1755 portrait of Madame de Pompadour wearing a floral gown with matching petticoat. Her sleeves end in flounces worn over lace engageantes. Her stomacher is decorated with a vertical row of ribbon bows.
3. A 1759 portrait of Madame de Pompadour shows her petticoat trimmed with flounces to match her gown. She wears a small lace ruff around her neck.
4. Elisabeth Freudenrich wears a gown trimmed with silk ribbons. Her hair is dressed high and two curls frame her neck, 1760.
5. Lady Susan Fox-Strangways's gown is worn with wide, tiered engageantes, 1761.
6. Queen Charlotte wears an elaborate neck ruffle with a large diamond brooch with her court gown. Her figure shows the full, rounded bust and small waist created by narrow-backed stays, 1761.
7. In the American colonies Mrs. John Murray wears a simple gown with cuffed sleeves, 1763.
8. Mrs. Benjamin Pickman, the wife of a wealthy merchant of Salem, Massachusetts, wears a blue silk gown with robings. She carries a parasol, 1763.
9. Mrs. Epes Sargent II wears a dark blue riding habit and carries a plumed hat, Massachusetts, 1764.
10. Marie Antoinette at age 15 wears a riding habit with a striped waistcoat. Her hair is tied back and she wears a tricorn hat, France, 1771.
11. Mrs John Winthrop of Boston, Massachusetts, in the fashionable dress of 1773. Her indoor cap is trimmed with striped and dotted ribbons, and her gown is trimmed with "robings" of ruched fabric—strips of fabric gathered on two sides. A lace fichu fills in her neckline.
12. Side view of a frock of 1774 shows pleated robings and striped ribbon rosettes.
13. Wedding dress of Hedvig Elisabeth Charlotte of Holstein-Gottorp made of silver brocade, 1774.
14. Portrait of Hedvig Elisabeth Charlotte of Holstein-Gottorp wearing the same dress as in the previous picture, 1774.

=== French fashion ===
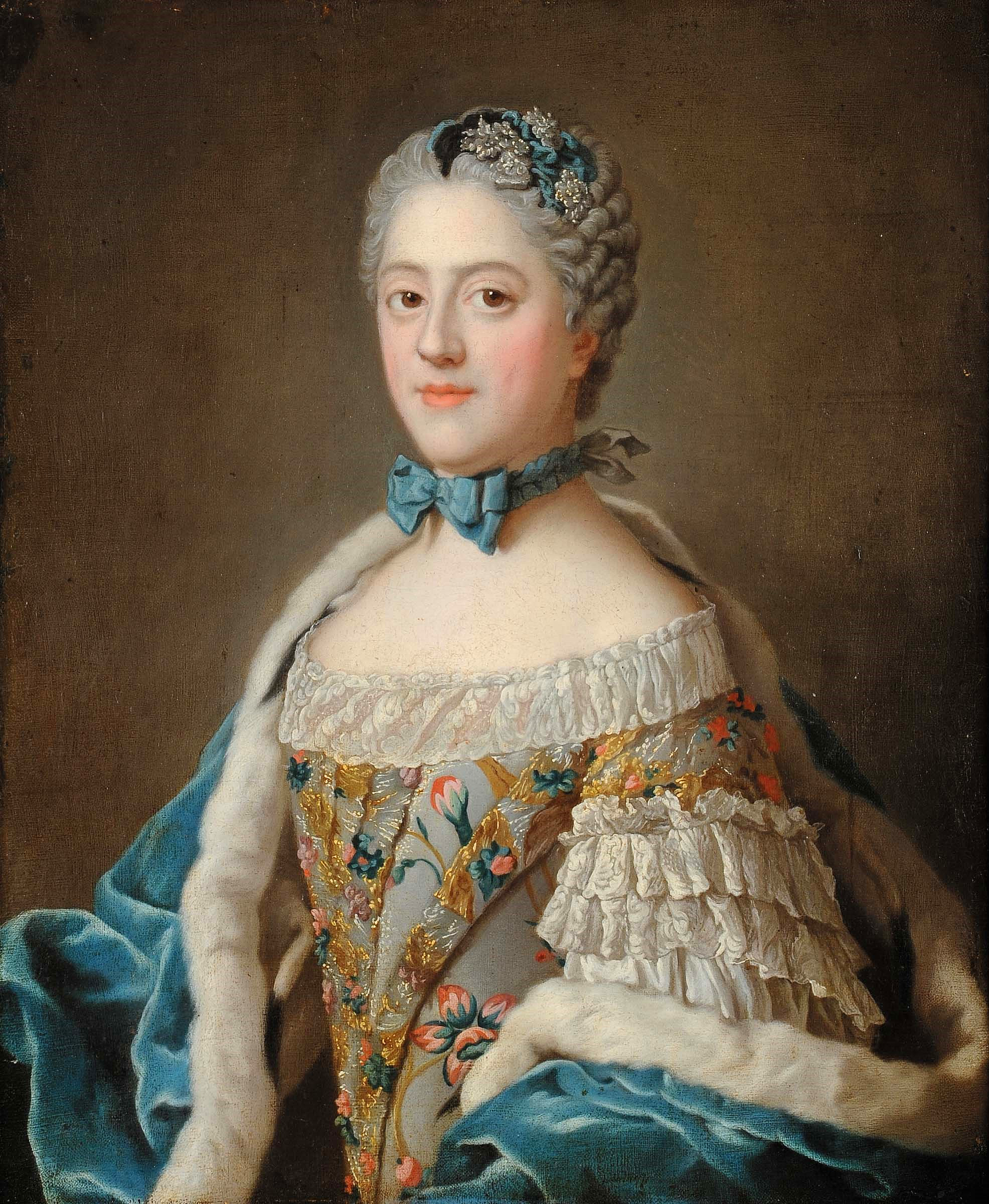
France, 1750

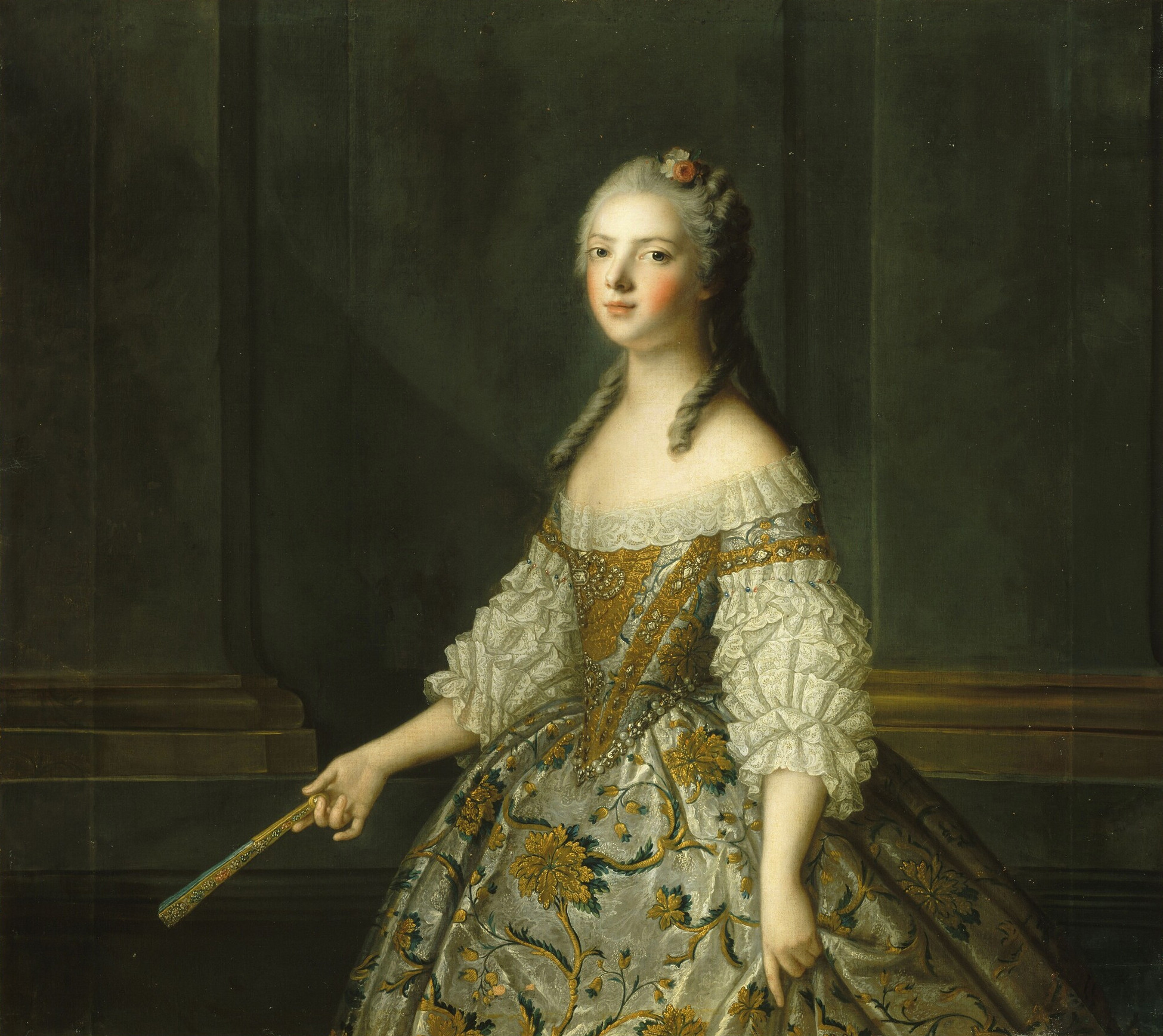
France, 1752

France, 1754

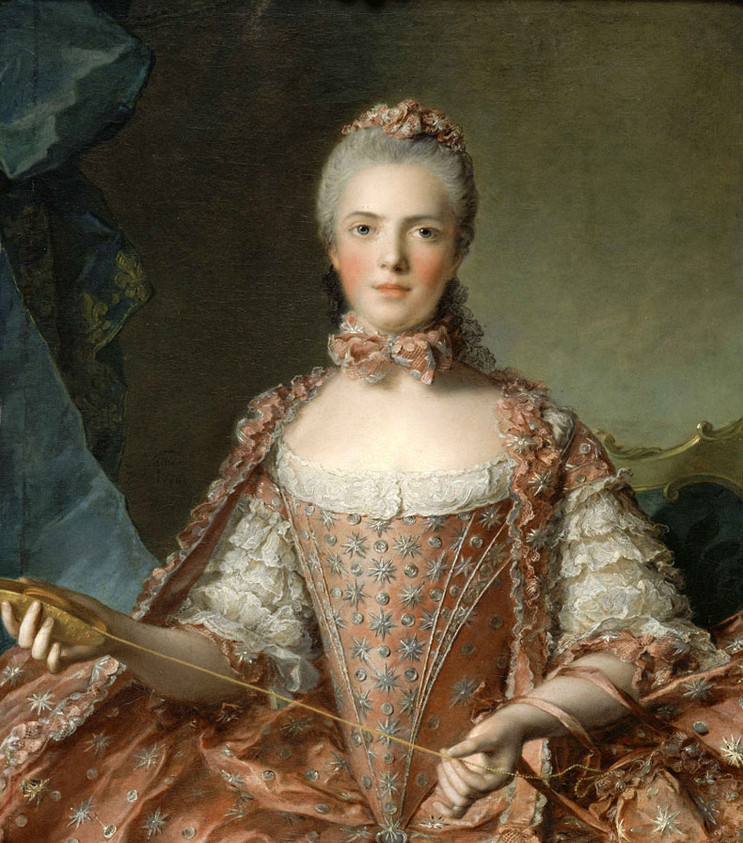
France, 1756

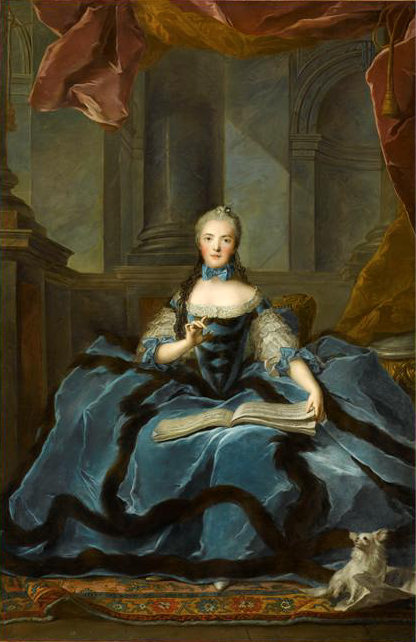
France, 1758

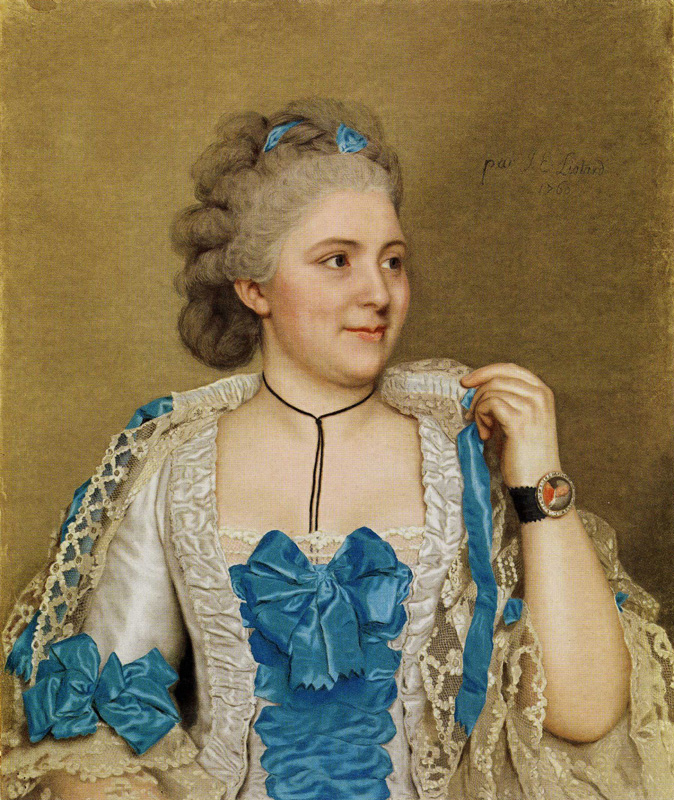
France, 1760

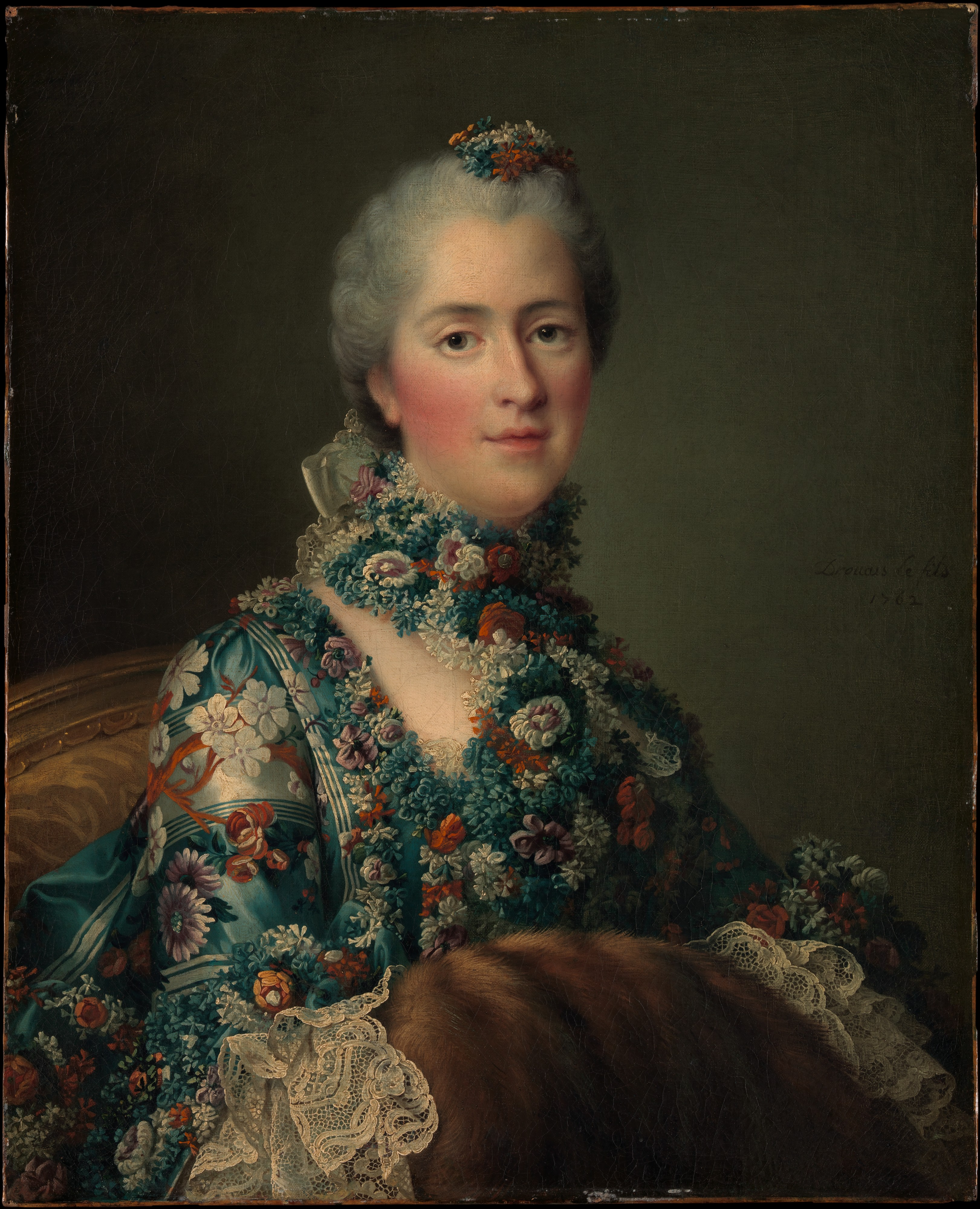
France, 1762

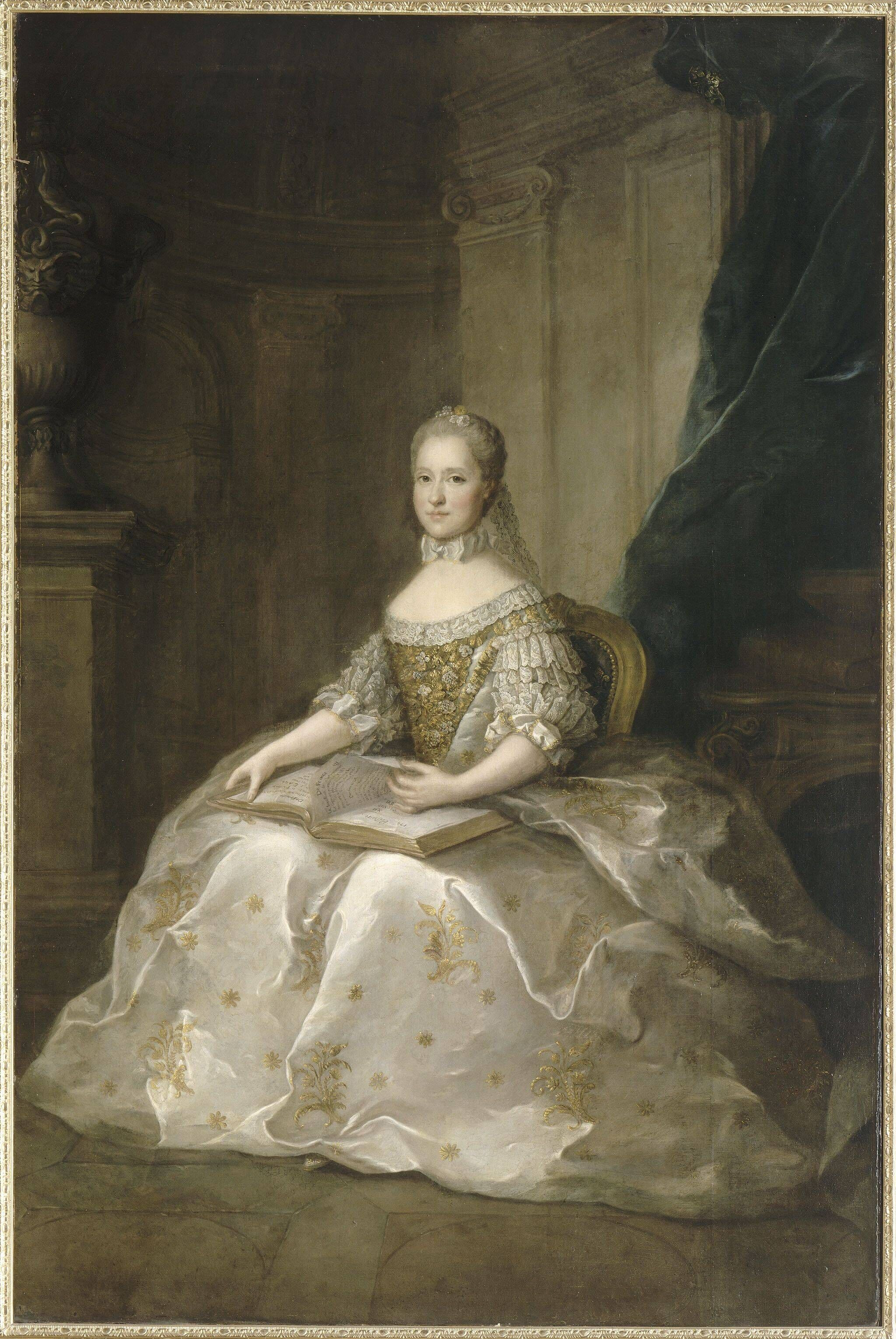
France, 1764

France, 1766

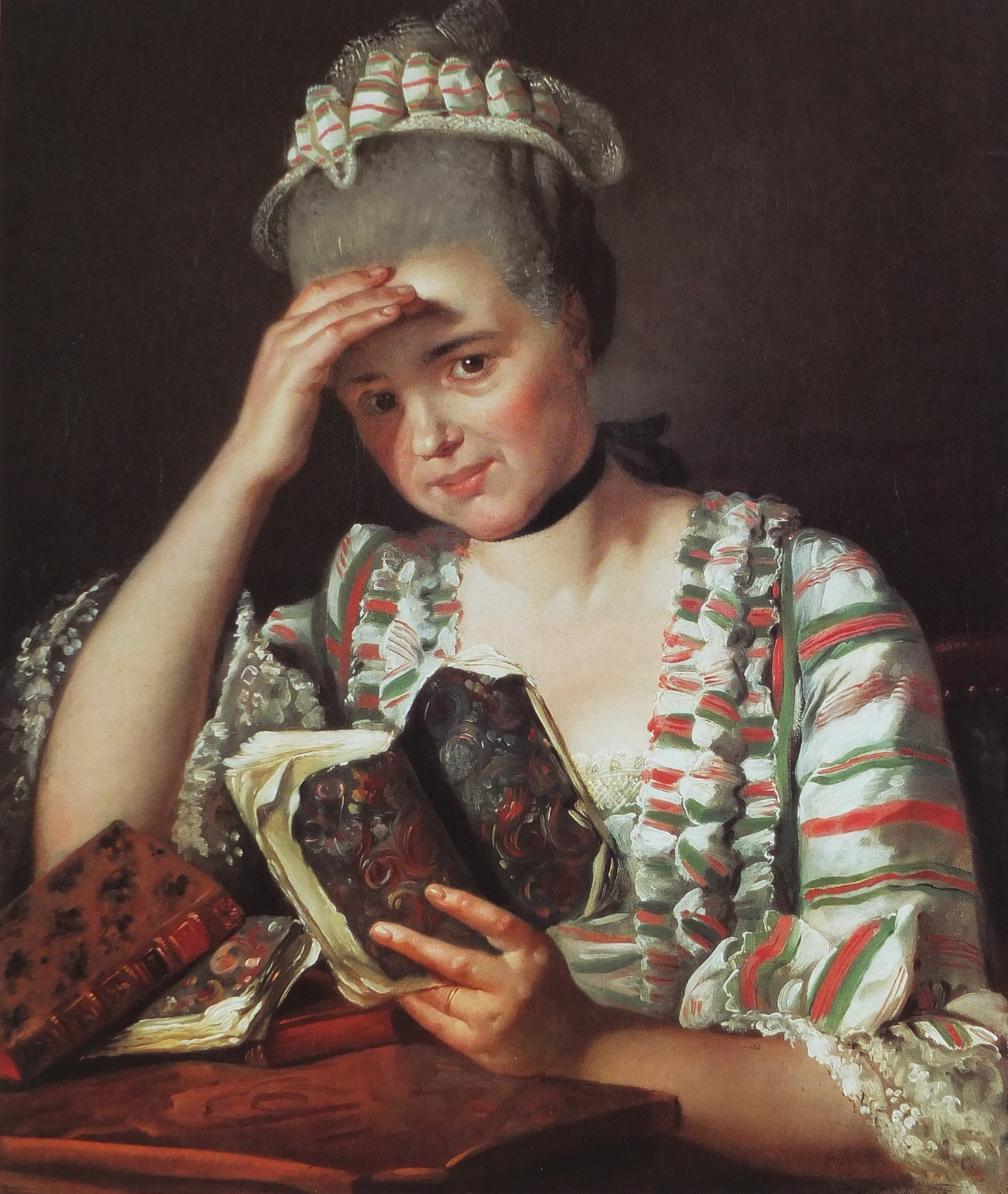
France, 1769

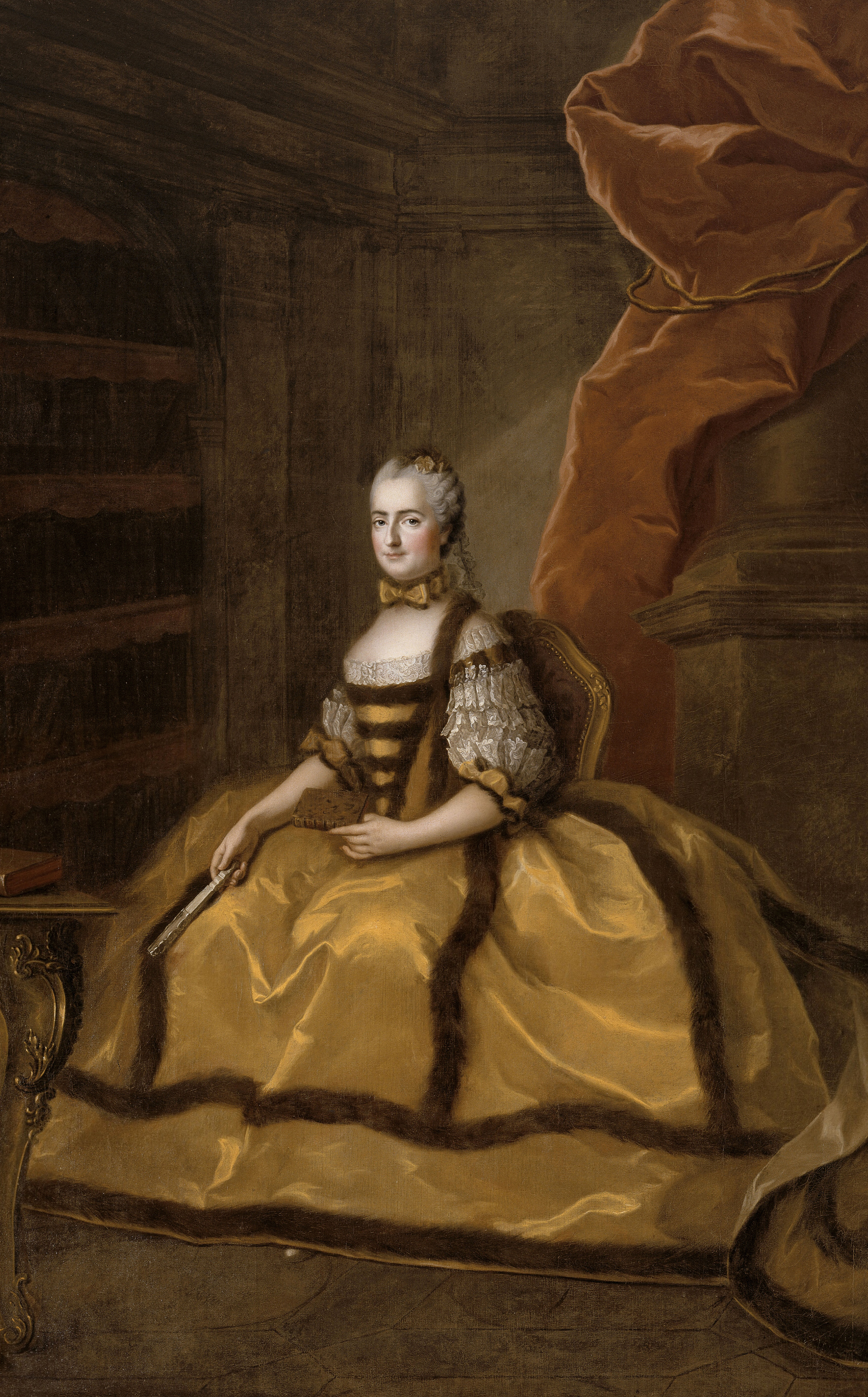
France, 1770

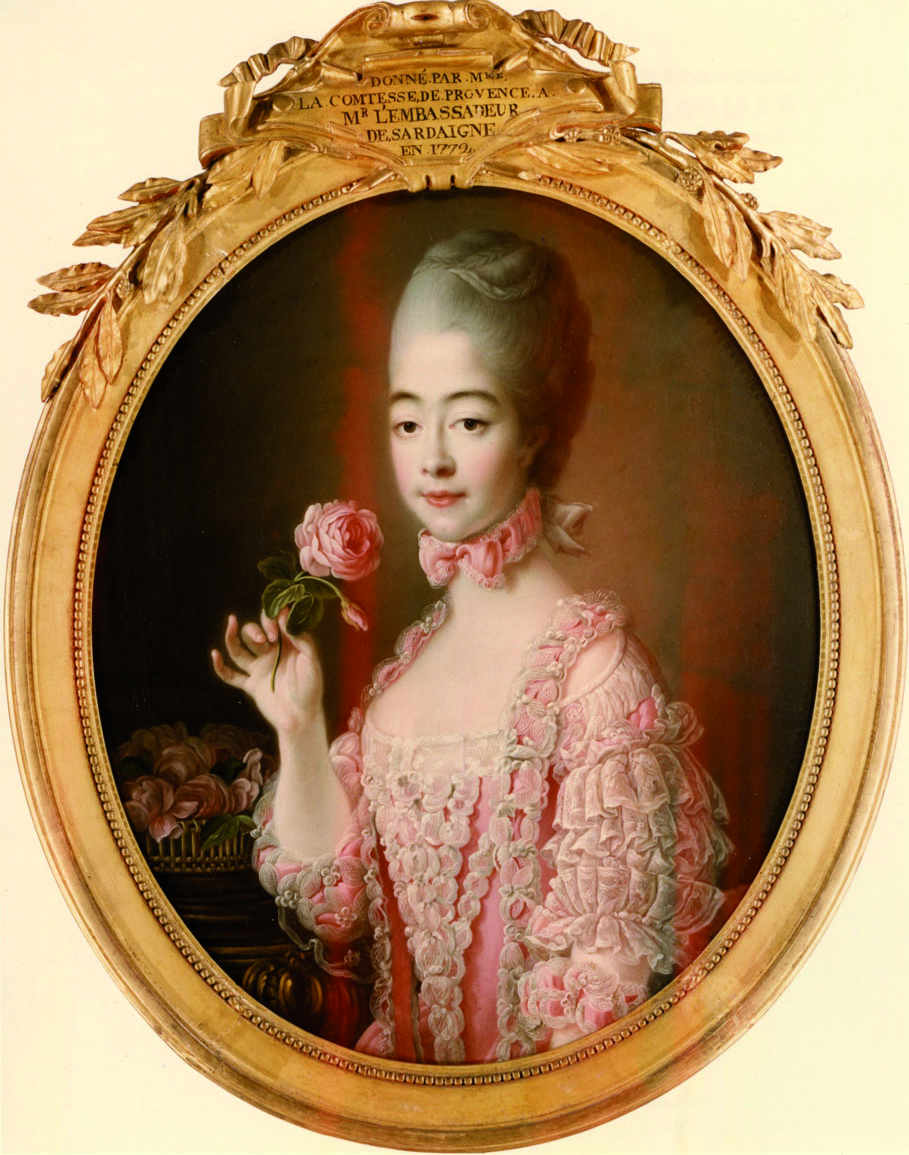
France, 1772

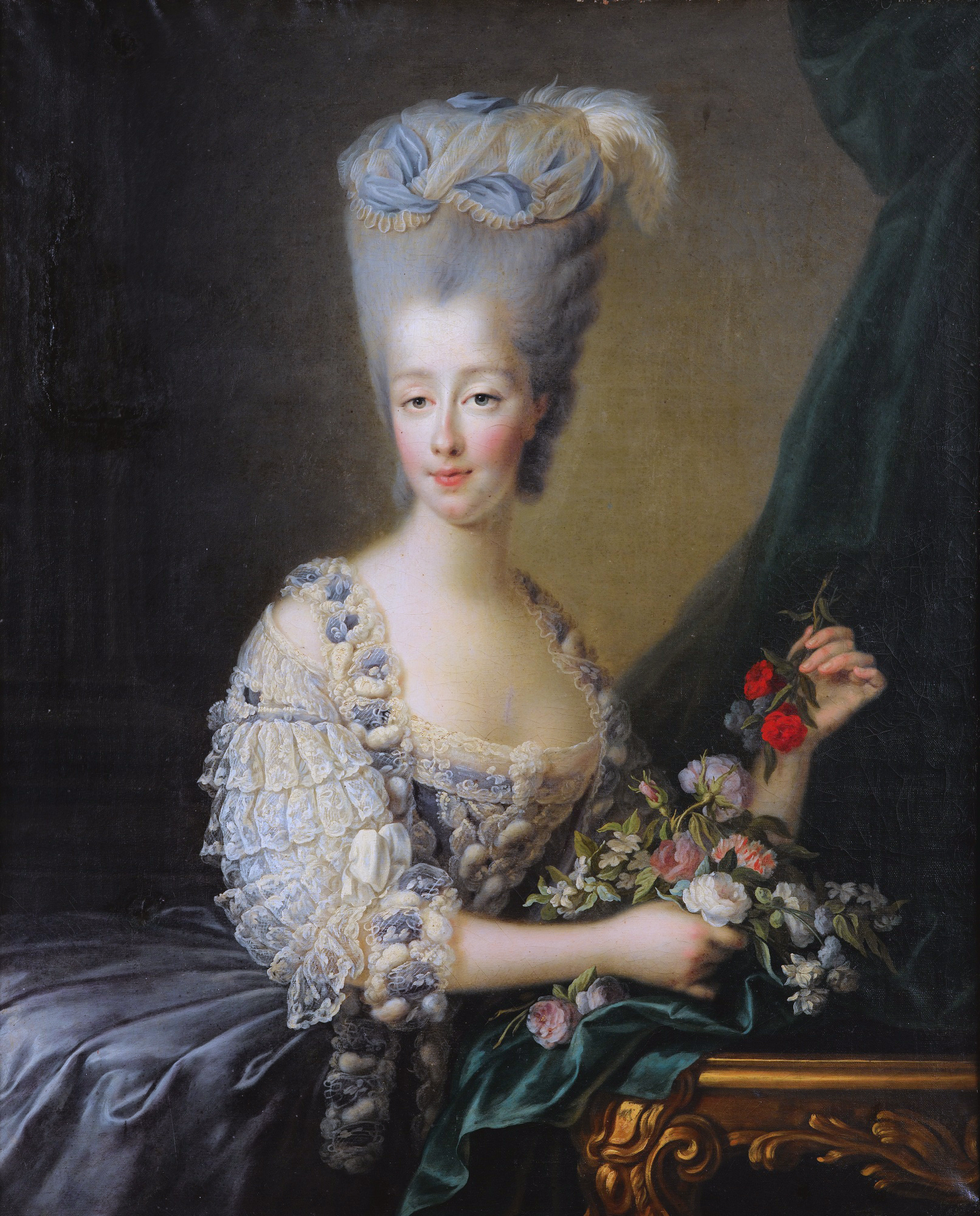
France, 1775

=== British fashion ===
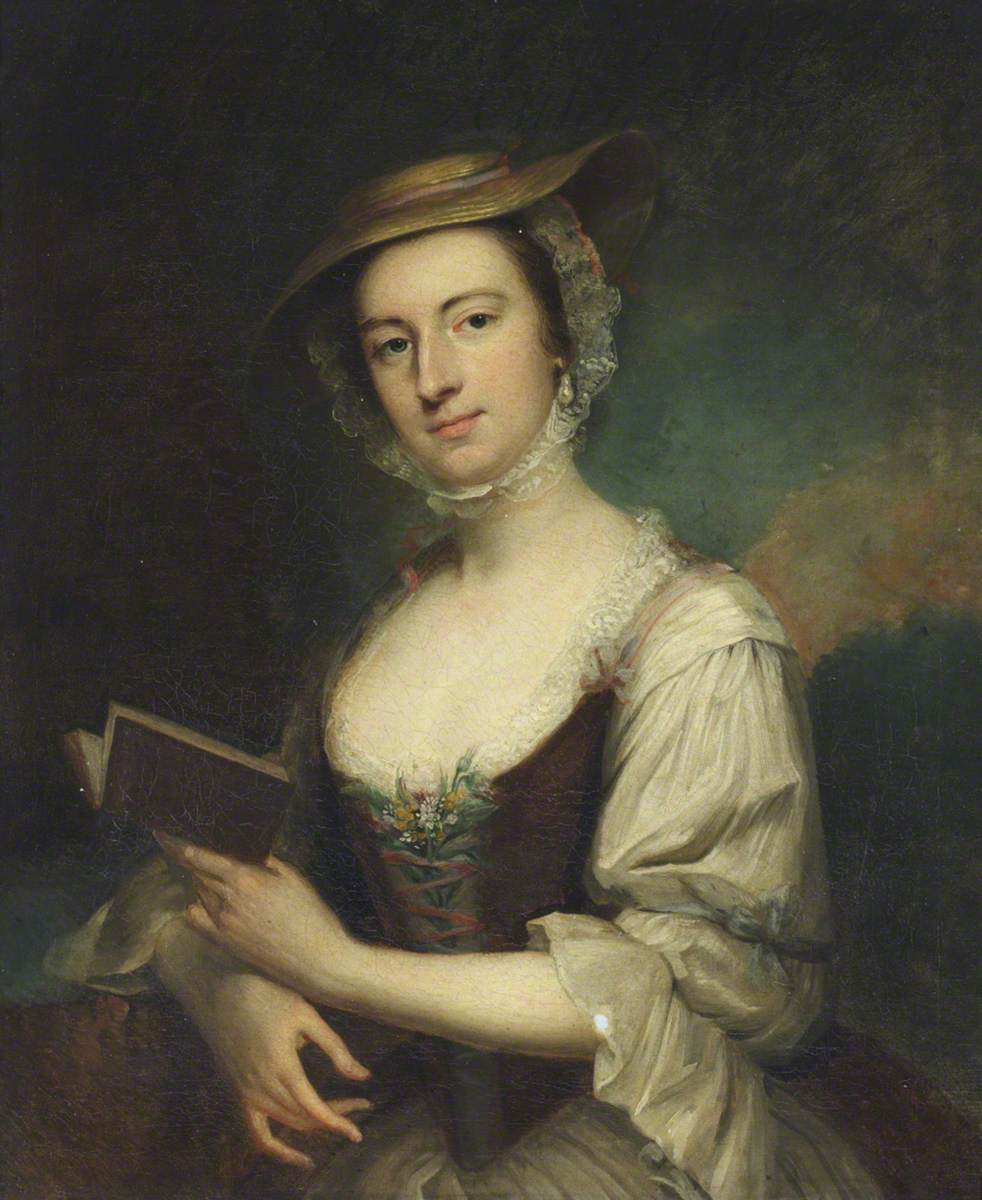
England, 1750

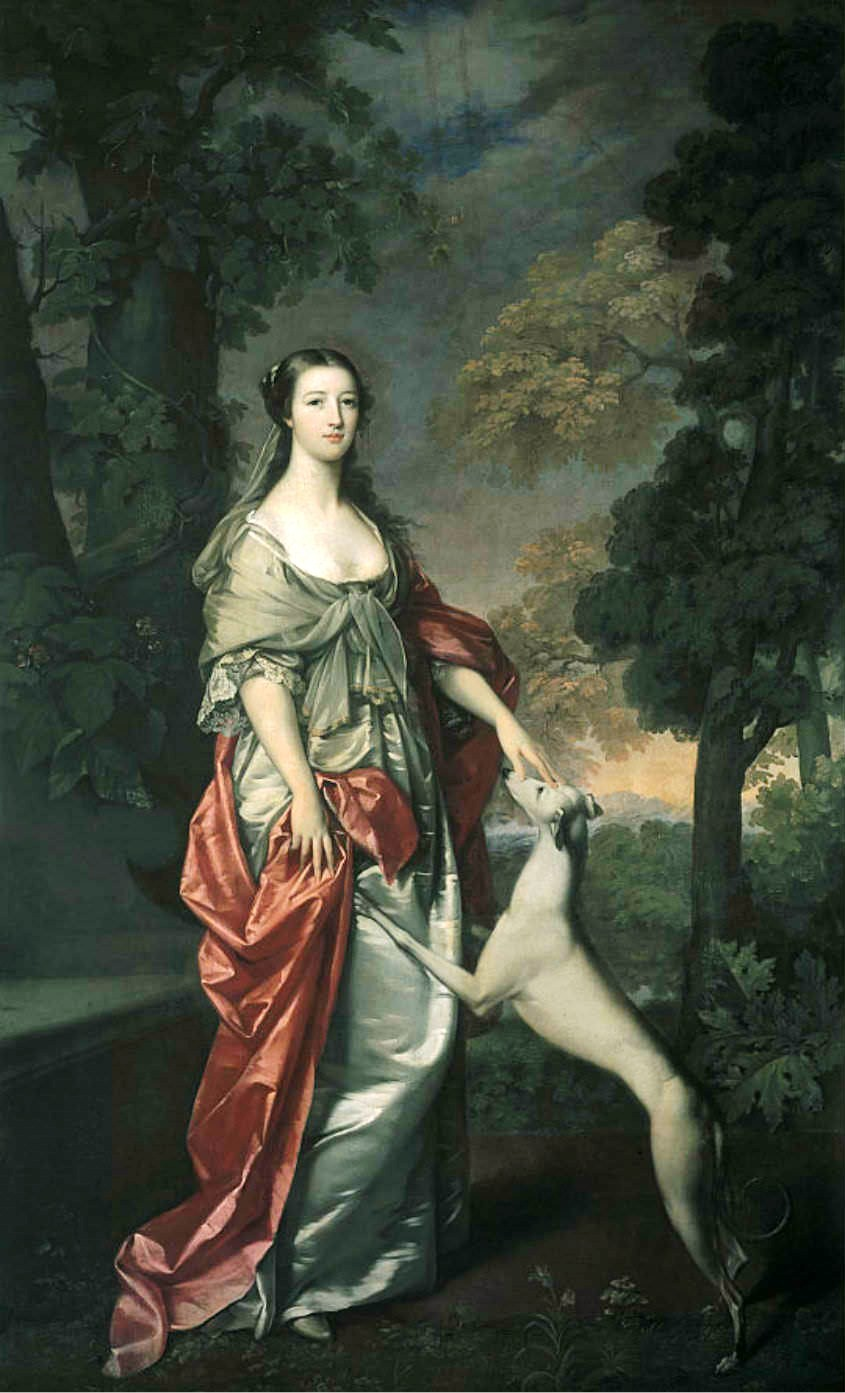
England, 1752

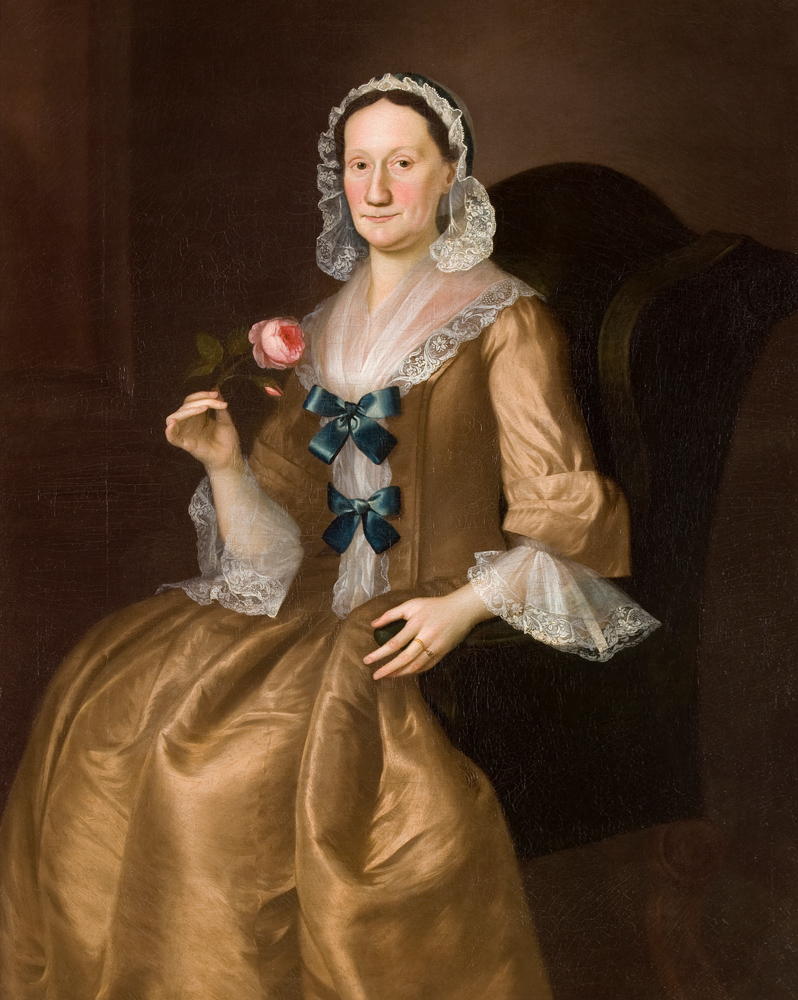
England, 1754

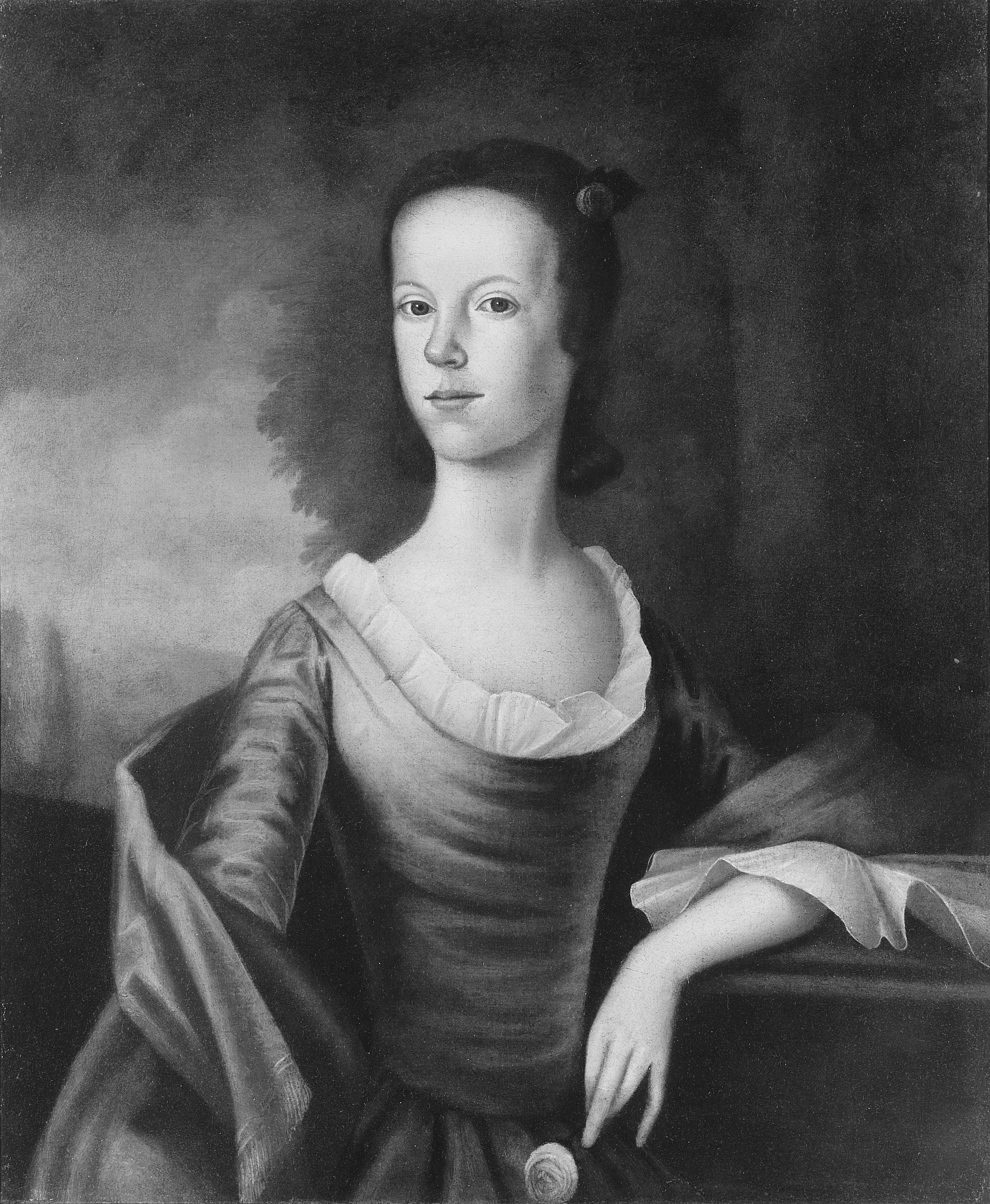
England, 1756

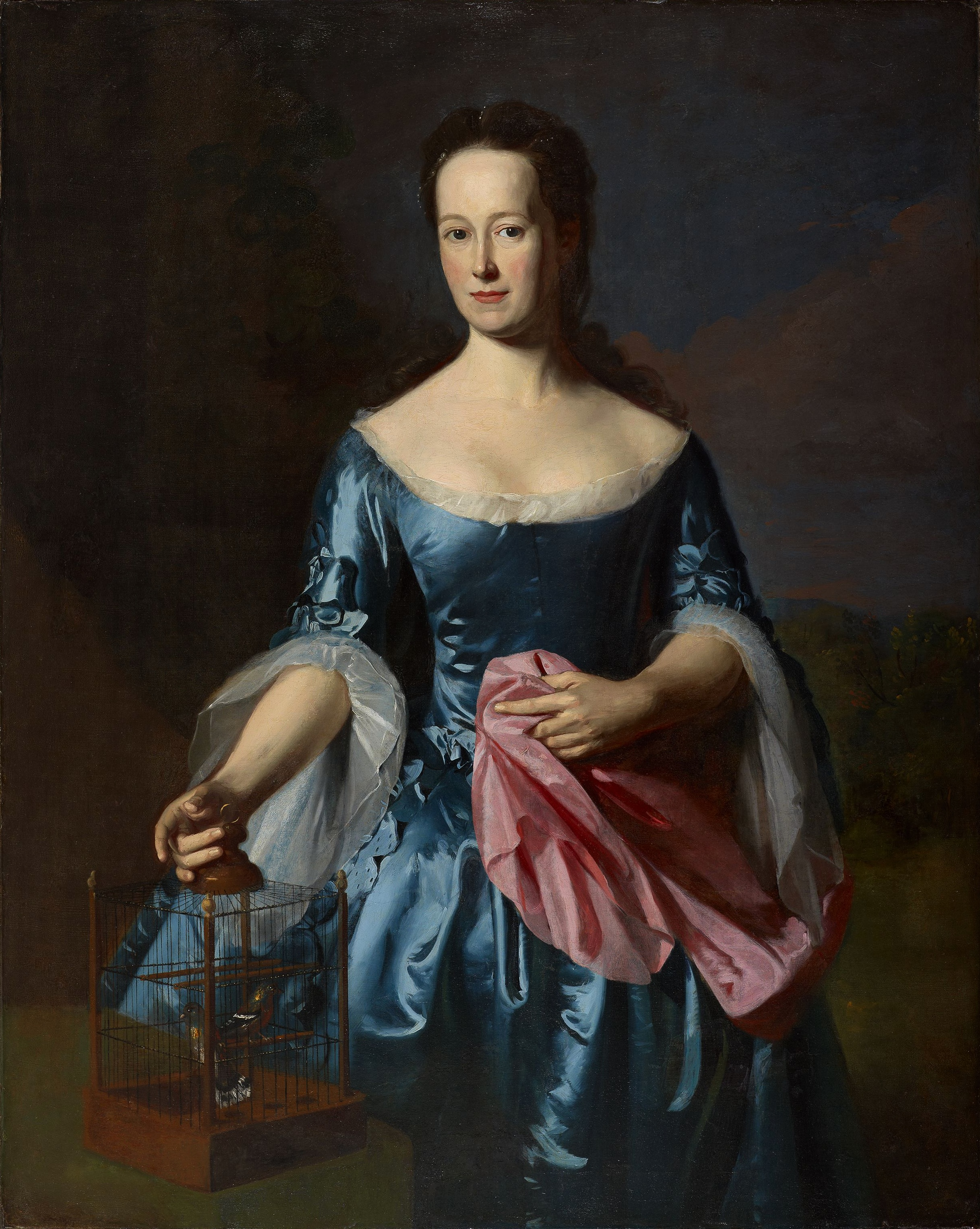
England, 1758

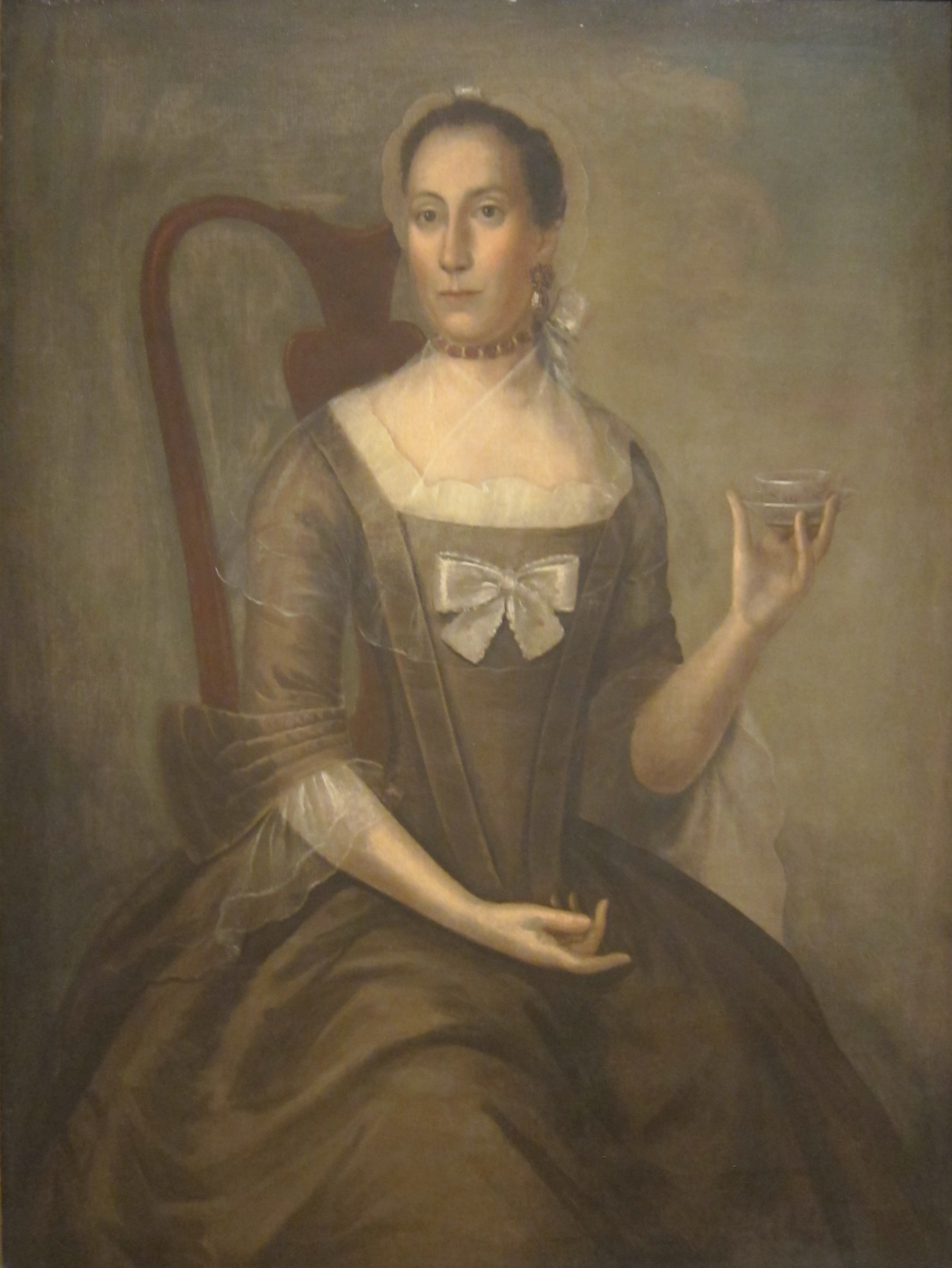
England, 1760

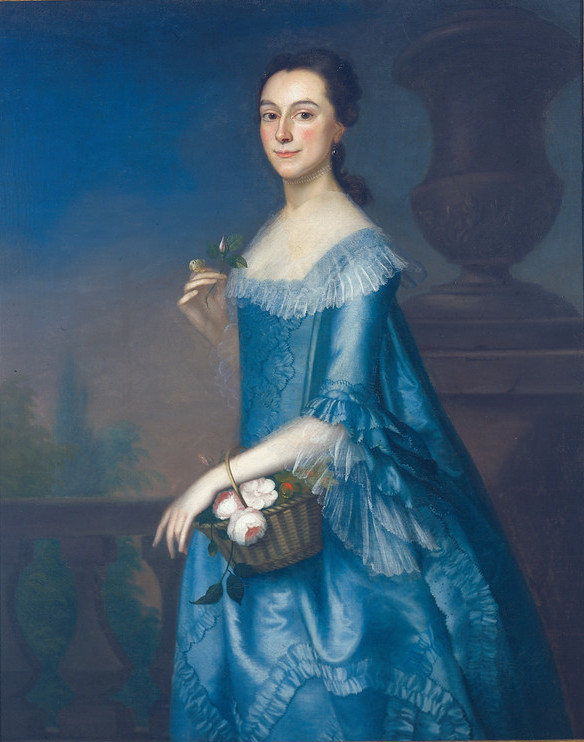
England, 1762

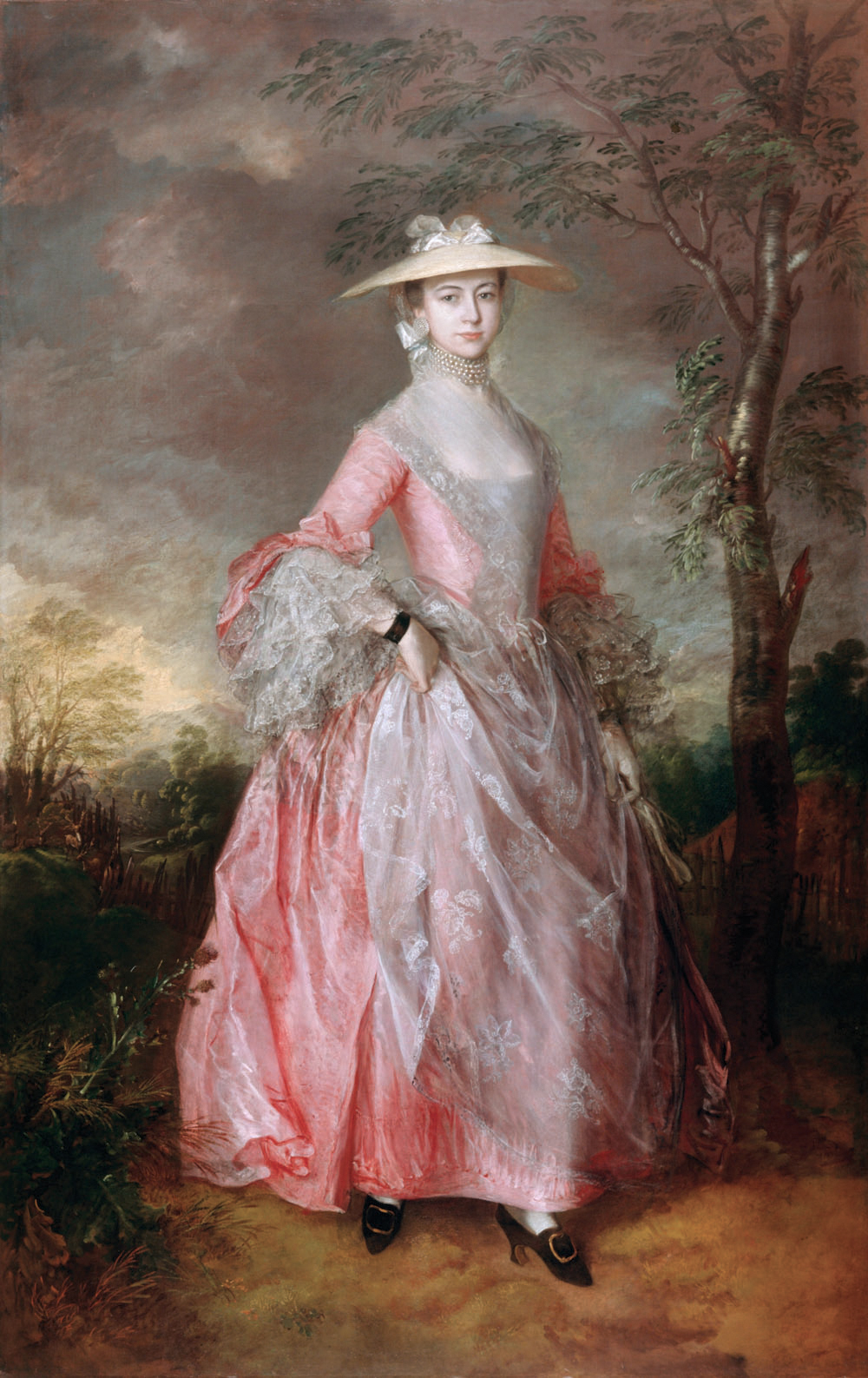
England, 1764

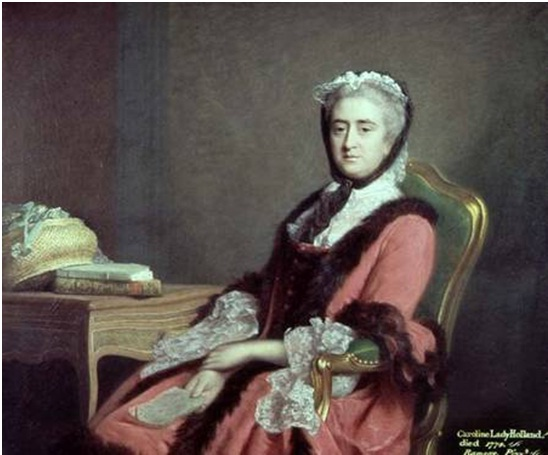
England, 1766

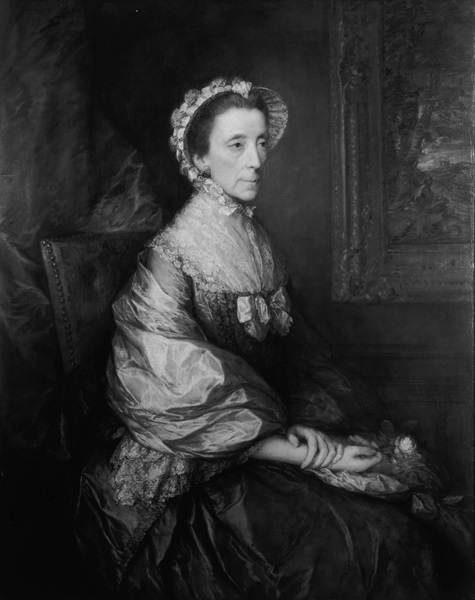
England, 1768

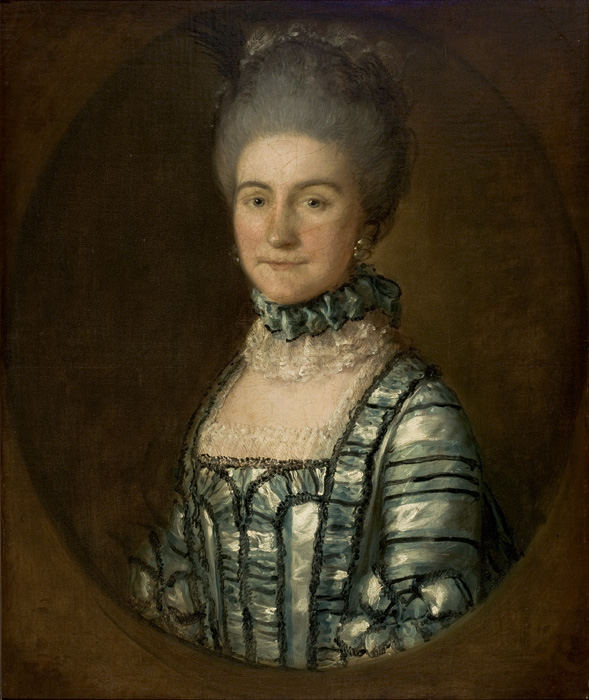
England, 1770

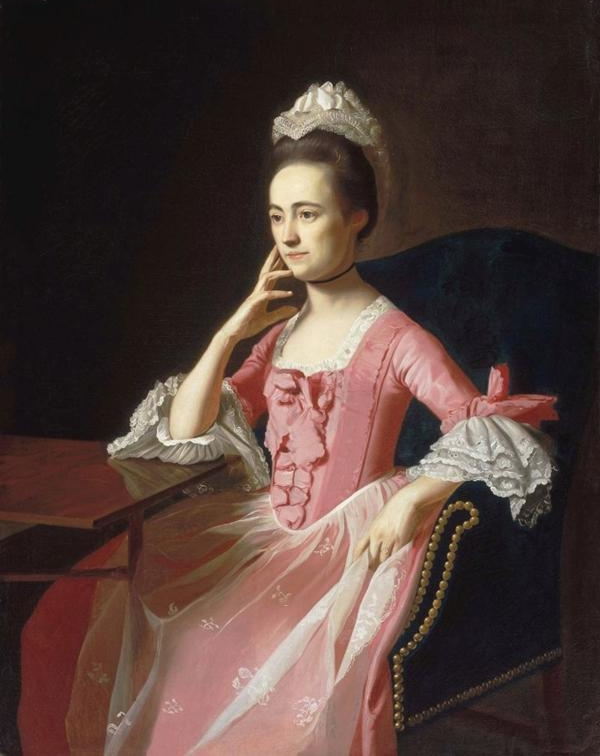
England, 1772

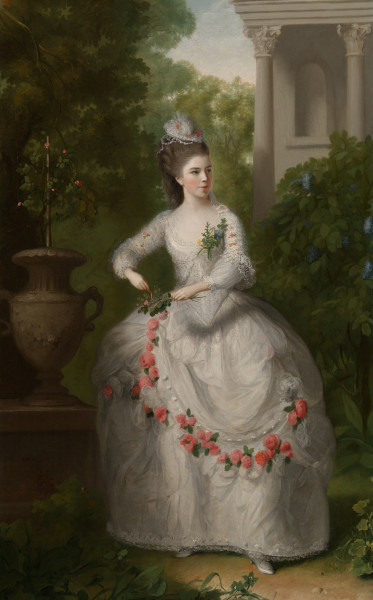
England, 1775

=== Spanish fashion ===
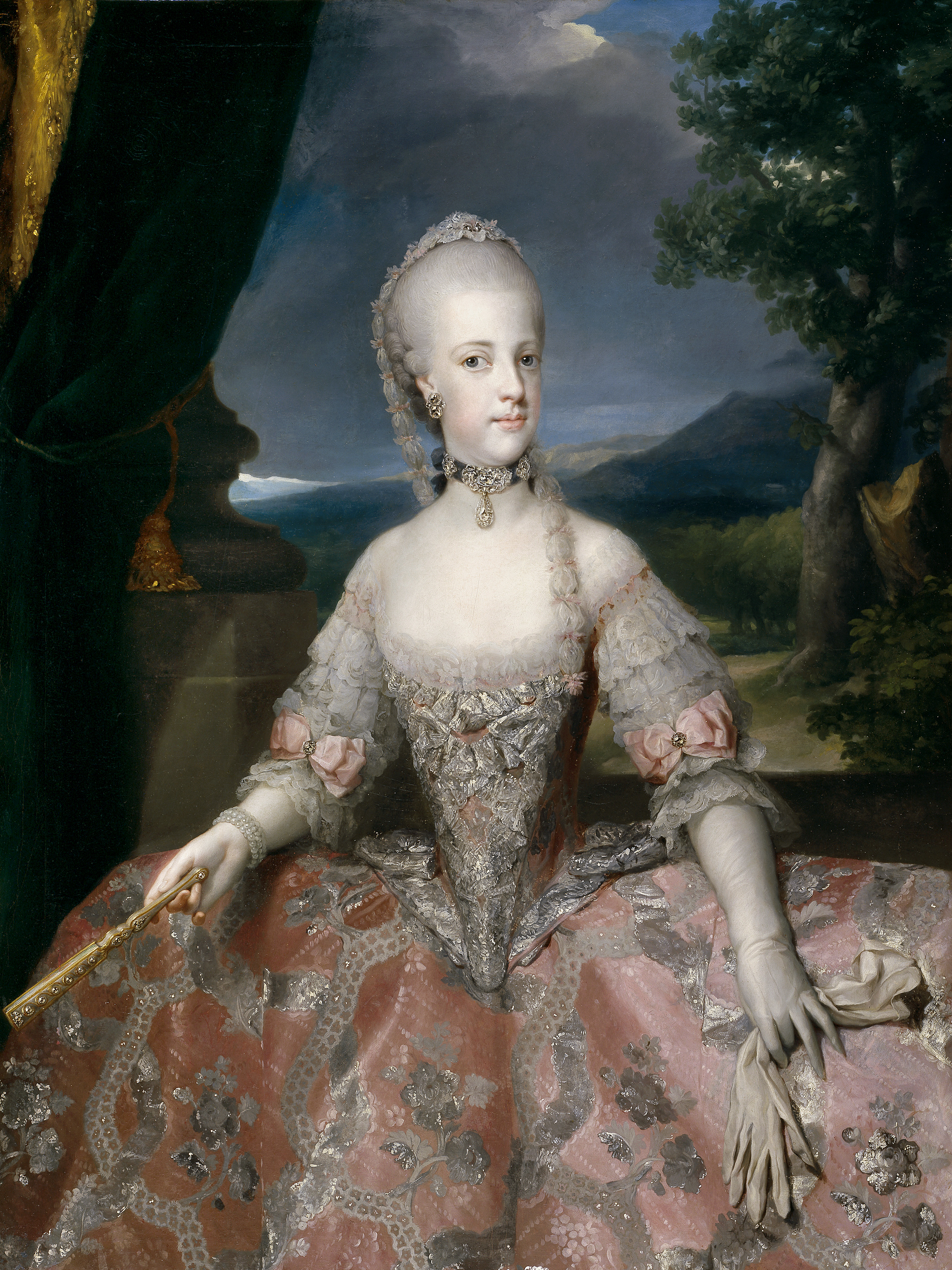
Spain, c. 1768

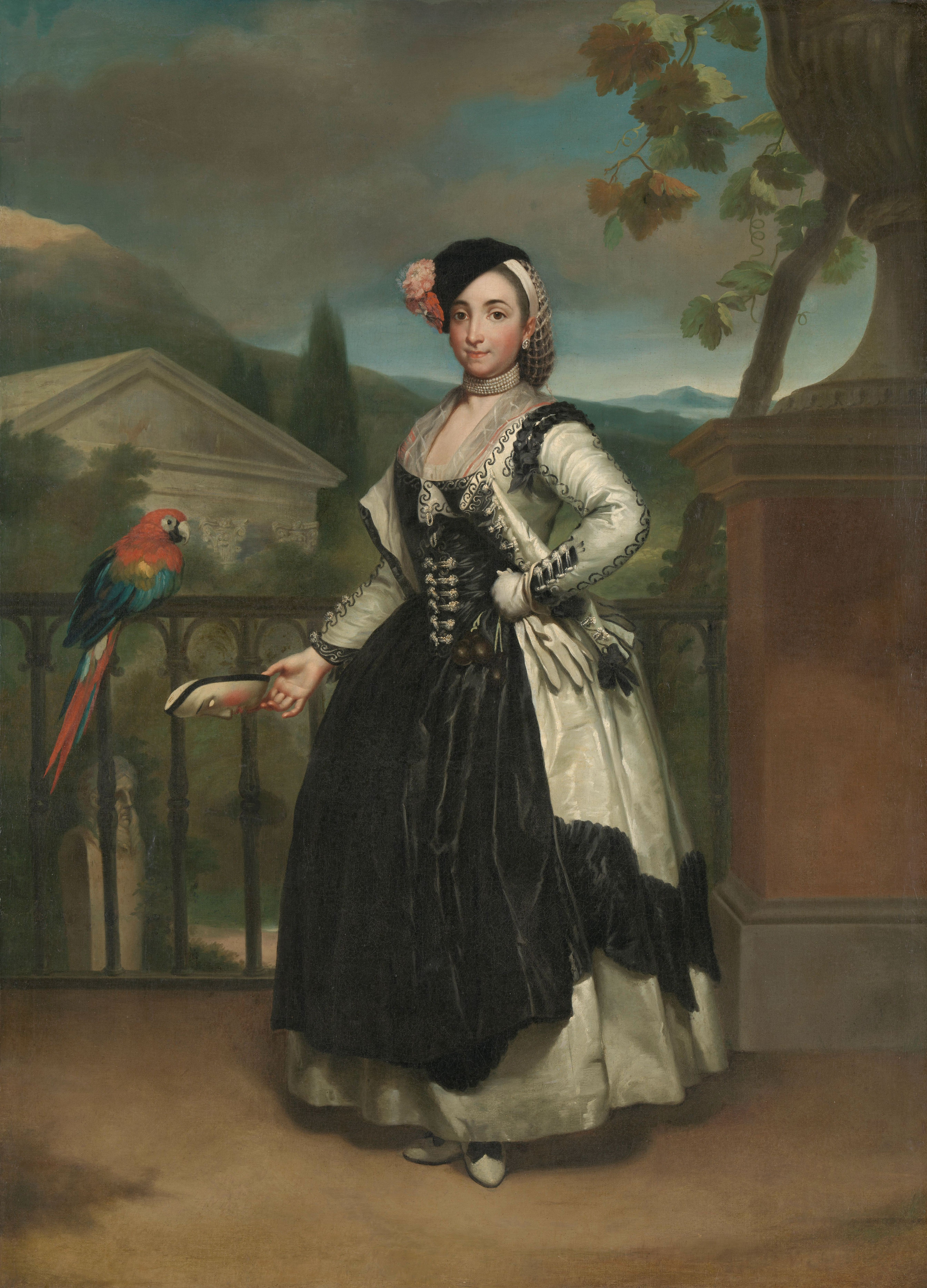
Spain, c. 1771–1772

== Men's fashion ==
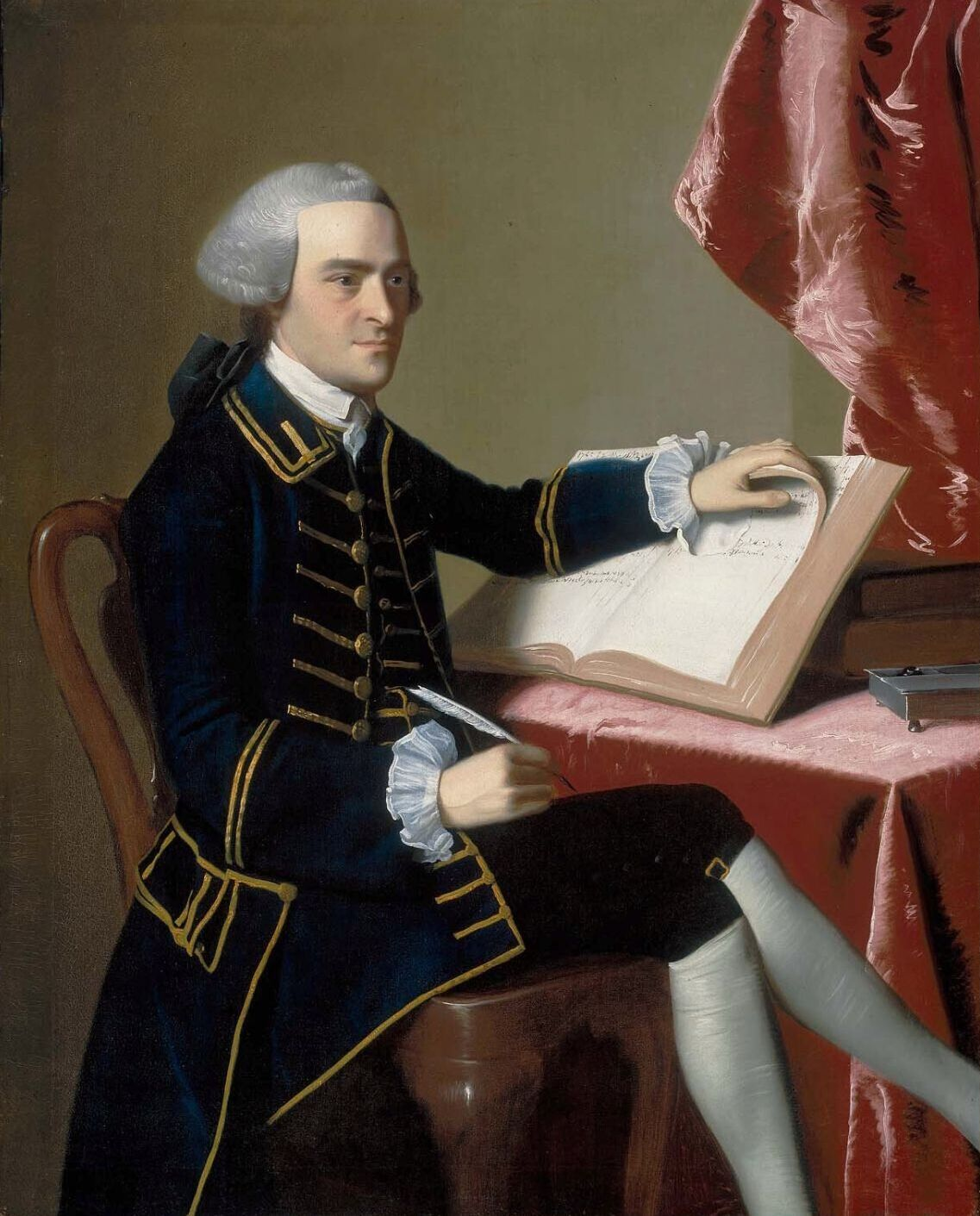
John Hancock of Boston wears a coat with a collar, waistcoat, and breeches of deep blue trimmed in gold braid, 1764

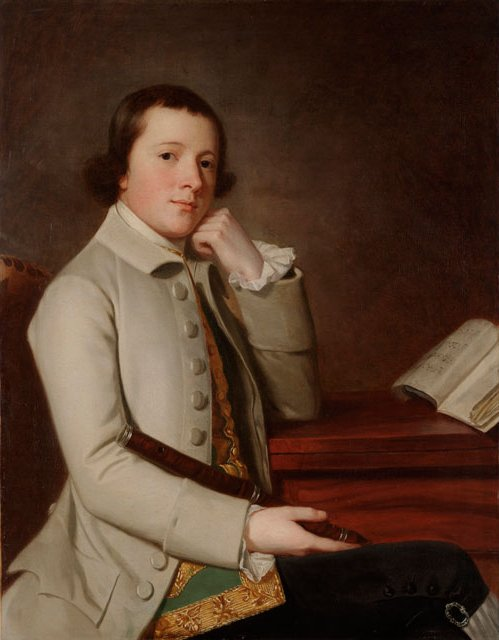
George Romney's Young Man with a Flute wears a gold figured waistcoat under his coat. His breeches have buttons and buckles at the knee, 1760s.

=== Overview ===
Throughout the period, men continued to wear the coat, waistcoat and breeches of the previous period. However, changes were seen in both the fabric used as well as the cut of these garments. More attention was paid to individual pieces of the suit, and each element underwent stylistic changes. Under new enthusiasms for outdoor sports and country pursuits, the elaborately embroidered silks and velvets characteristic of "full dress" or formal attire earlier in the century gradually gave way to carefully tailored woollen "undress" garments for most occasions, whilst continuing to be worn for more formal ones (e.g. Balls, receptions, court appearances...). This more casual style reflected the dominating image of "nonchalance." The goal was to look as fashionable as possible with seemingly little effort. This was to be the new, predominant mindset of fashion.

=== Coats ===
The skirts of the coat narrowed from the gored styles of the previous period. Waistcoats extended to mid-thigh to the 1770s and then began to shorten. Waistcoats could be made with or without sleeves.

As in the previous period, a loose, T-shaped silk, cotton or linen gown called a banyan was worn at home as a sort of dressing gown over the shirt, waistcoat, and breeches. Men of an intellectual or philosophical bent were painted wearing banyans, with their own hair or a soft cap rather than a wig.

A coat with a wide collar called a frock coat, derived from a traditional working-class coat, was worn for hunting and other country pursuits in both Britain and America.

=== Shirt and stock ===
Shirt sleeves were full, gathered at the wrist and had a dropped shoulder seam. Full-dress shirts had ruffles of fine fabric or lace, while undress shirts ended in plain wrist bands.

=== Breeches, shoes, and stockings ===
Knee-length breeches fitted snugly and typically had a fall-front opening.

Low-heeled leather shoes fastened with buckles were worn with silk or woollen stockings. Boots were worn for riding. The buckles were either polished metal, usually in silver—sometimes with the metal cut into false stones in the Paris style—or with paste stones, although there were other types. These buckles were often quite large and one of the world's largest collections can be seen at Kenwood House.

=== Hairstyles and headgear ===
Wigs were worn by middle and upper class men, or the hair was worn long, brushed back from the forehead and "clubbed" (tied back at the nape of the neck) with a black ribbon. Black silk bags could enclose the queue. Wigs grew shorter and less full than they had been in earlier years, but long wigs continued to be popular with the older generation. Hair was powdered for formal occasions.

Wide-brimmed hats turned up on three sides called "cocked hats"—called tricorns in later eras—were worn in the mid-century.

=== The Macaroni ===
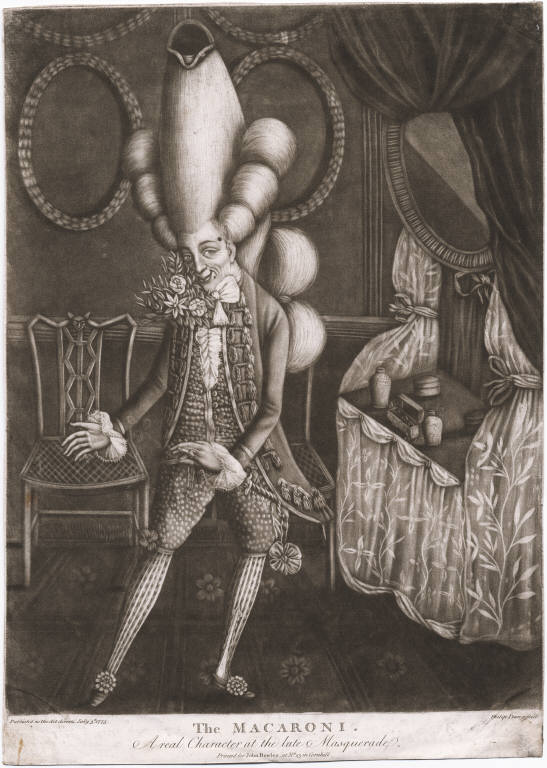
1773 caricature of the exaggerated style of the macaroni

The trend of the macaroni grew out of the tradition of those who partook of the Grand Tour. Elite men in the 18th century would travel abroad across Europe, namely Italy, to broaden their cultural depth. These men adopted foreign fashions and tastes and brought them back to England where they interpreted them further. The original macaroni of the 1760s was characterized by elaborate dress consisting of short and tight trousers, large wigs, delicate shoes and small hats. As the general population of English males became exposed to the luxurious appeal of the macaroni trend, they began to adopt and replicate the trends they saw. By the 1770s, any man could appear as if they themselves had been on the Grand Tour-based solely on their outward appearance.

The macaroni and the subsequent imitators were criticized for being gender ambiguous and effeminate. Frequently, the macaroni fashion trend was the subject of satirical caricatures and pamphlets. Their large costume like wigs and short coats, which deeply contrasted the masculine British dress of the time, were ridiculed for their frivolity and were said to be threatening the stability of gender difference, thereby undermining the nation's reputation. The question of farce and inauthenticity comes into play as well because by dressing as a macaroni, one claimed the status and the means of an elite who went on the Grand Tour.

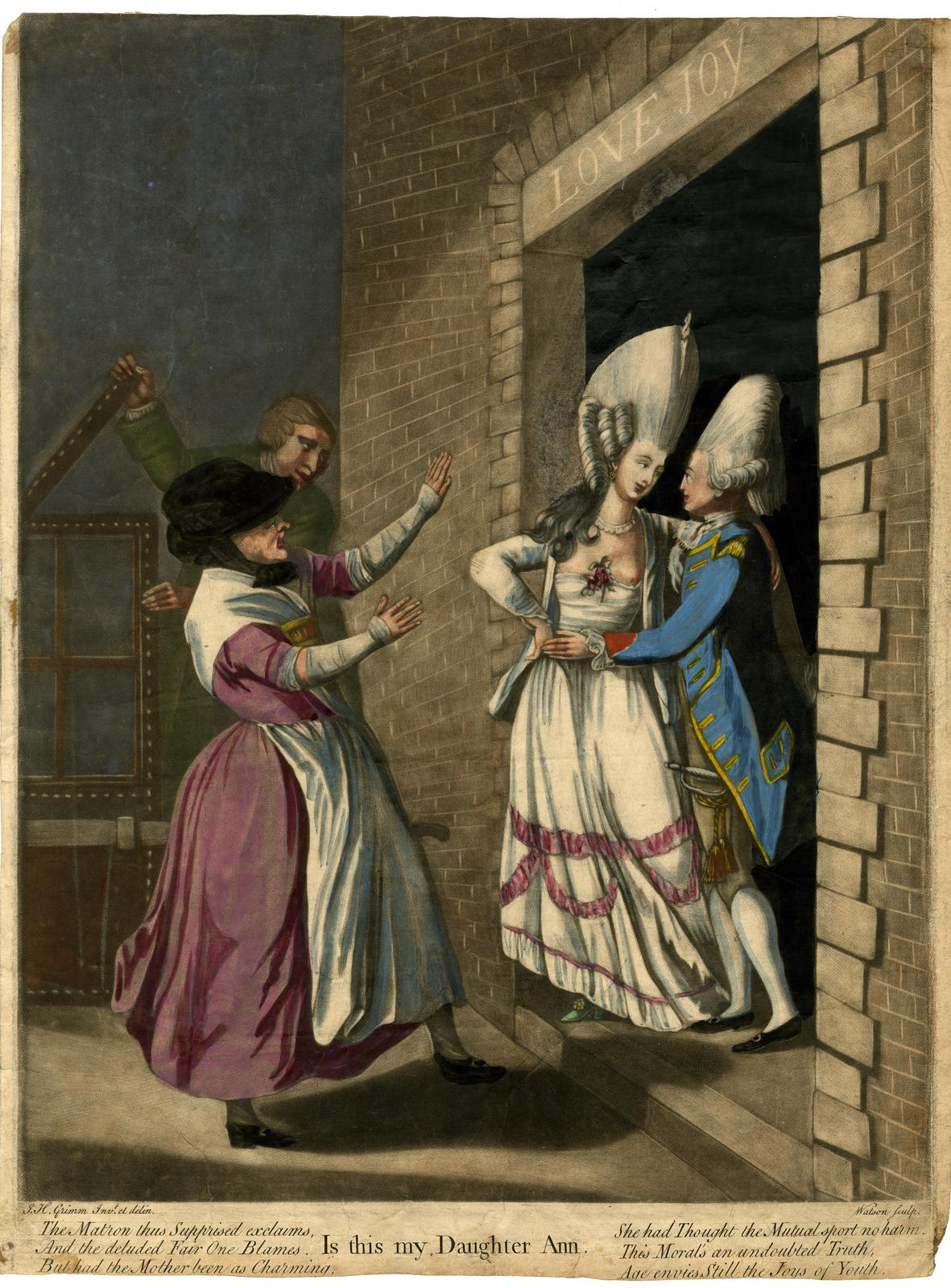
1774 caricature of a young lady and her macaroni beau

Although many mocked the macaroni for their outwardly eccentric characteristics, some celebrated them for their commitment to the demonstration of personal identity. The idea of a unique character was becoming an important concept that spanned many types of media including books and prints as Britain wanted to distinguish itself from France.

=== Men's style gallery ===
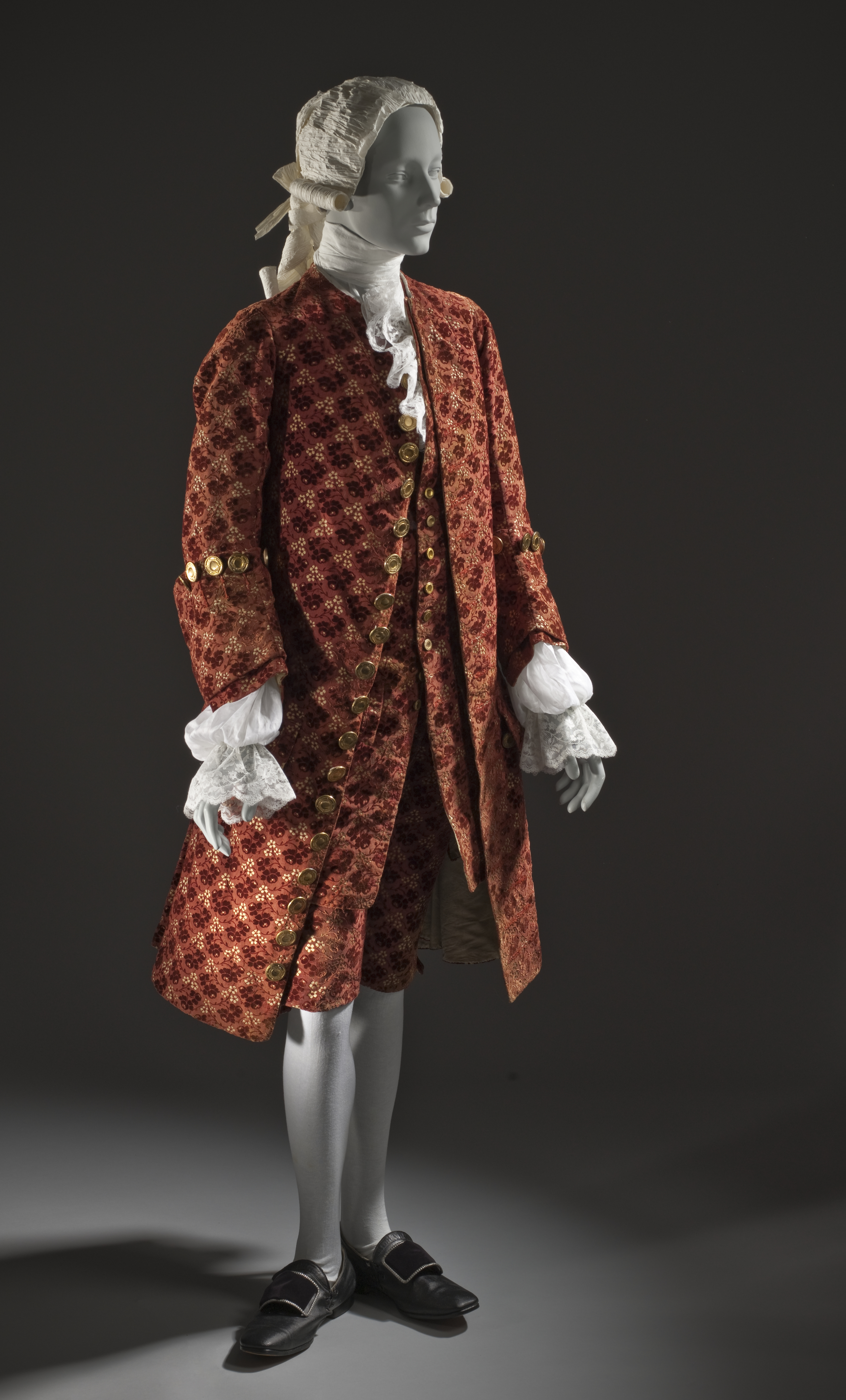
1 – c. 1755

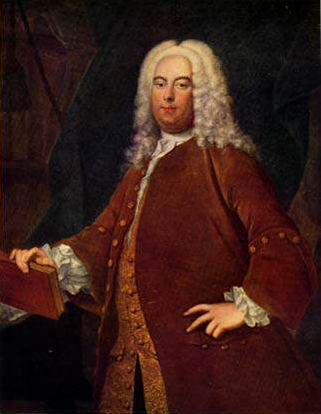
2 – 1756

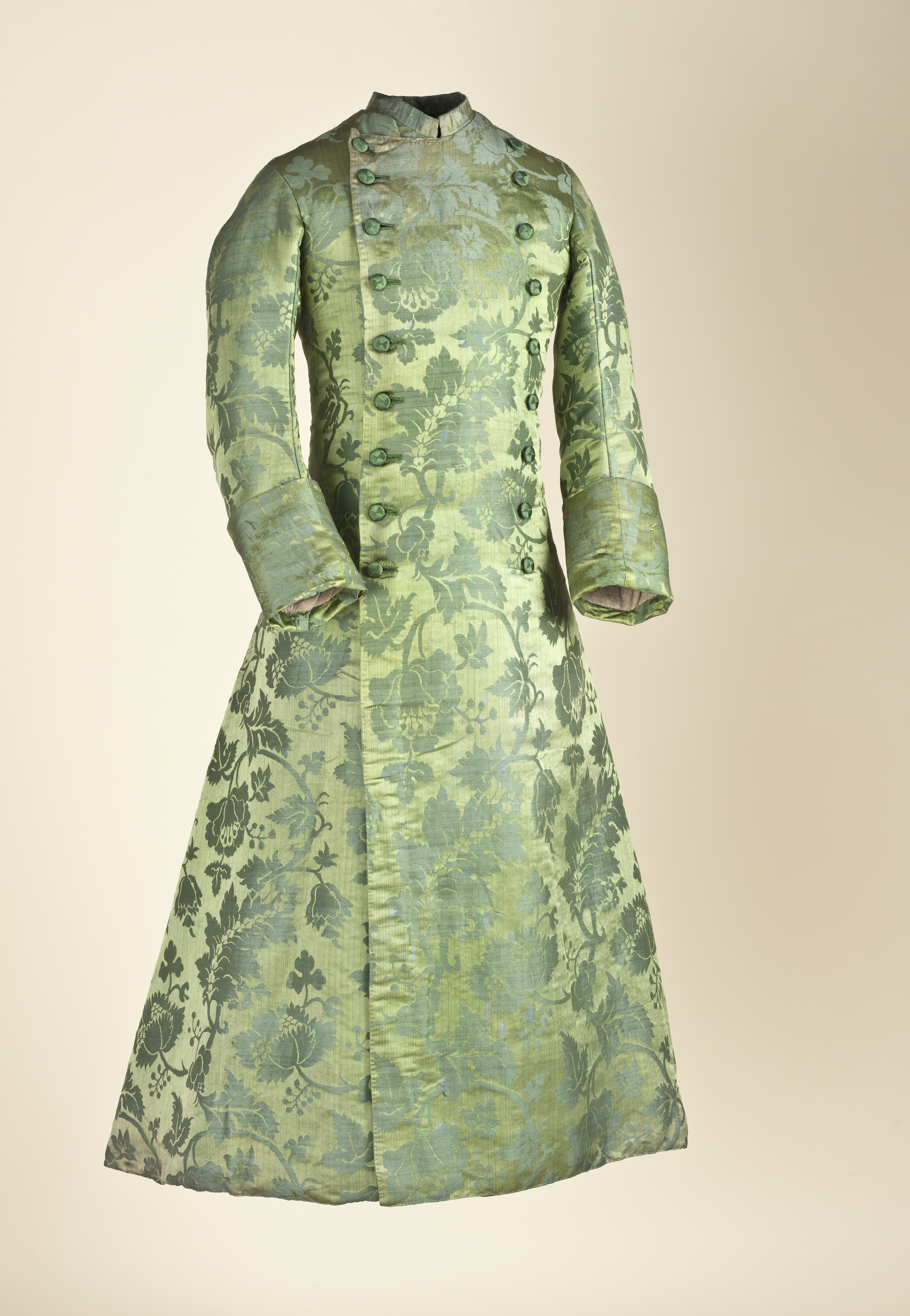
3 – 1750–60

4 – 1761

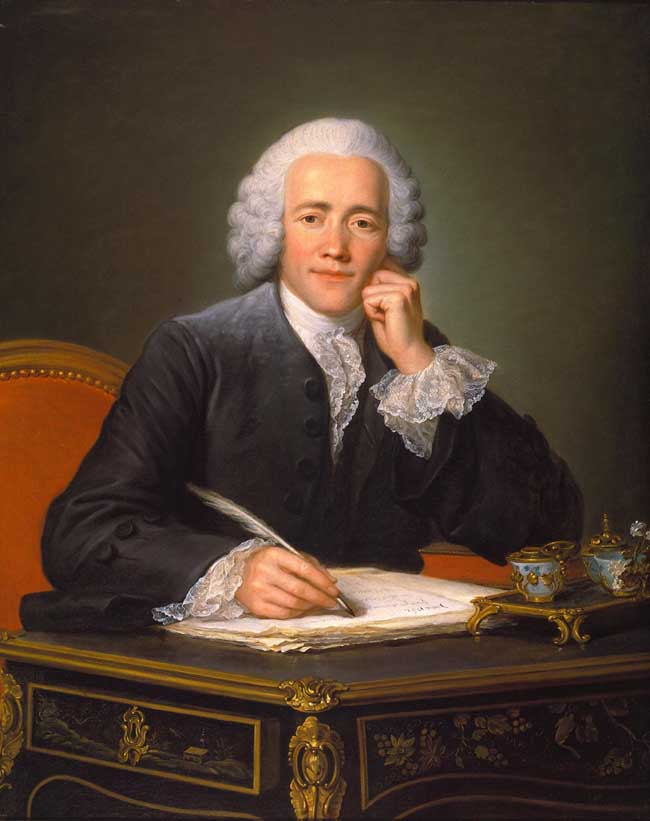
5 – 1761

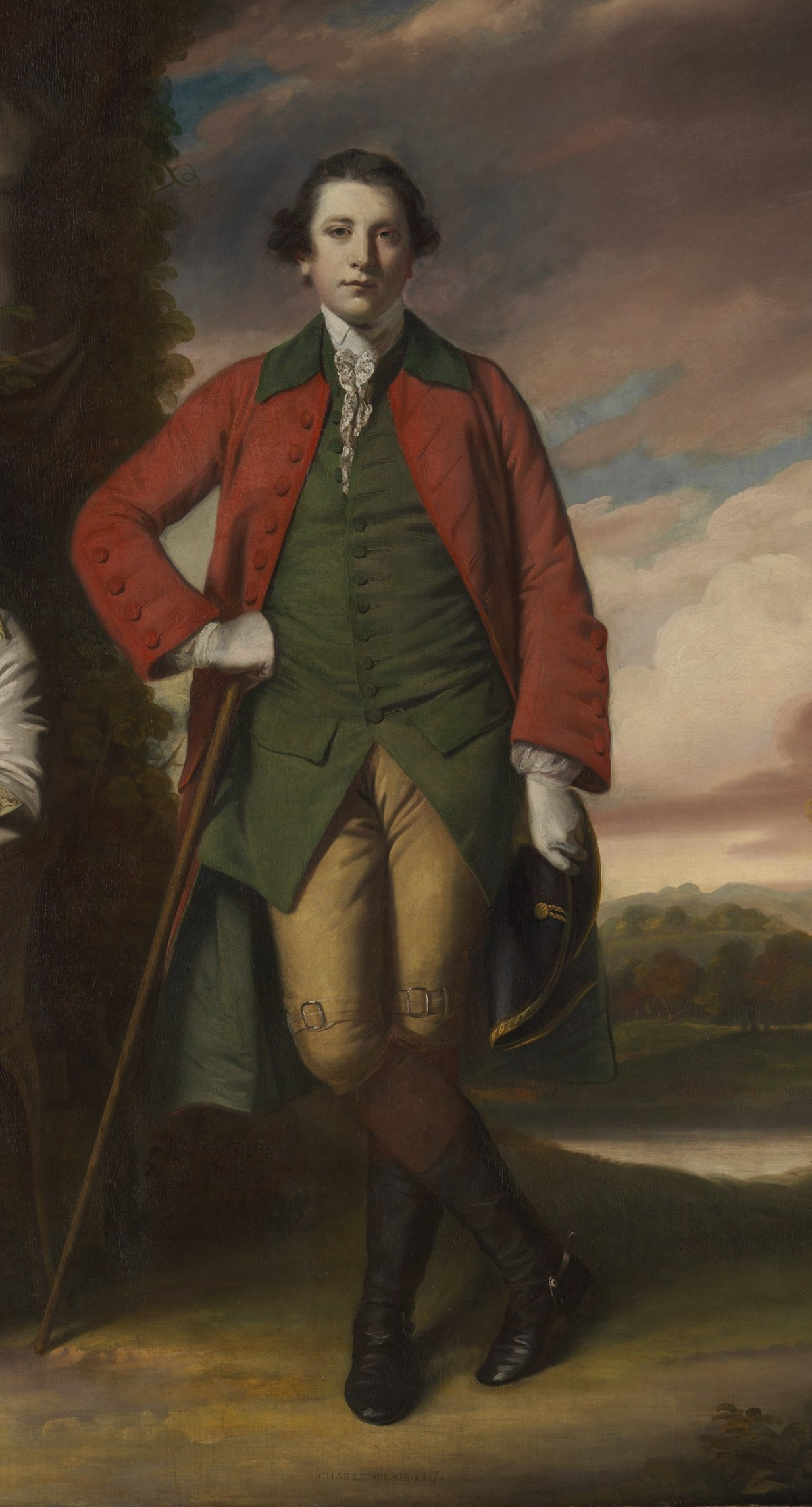
6 – c. 1762

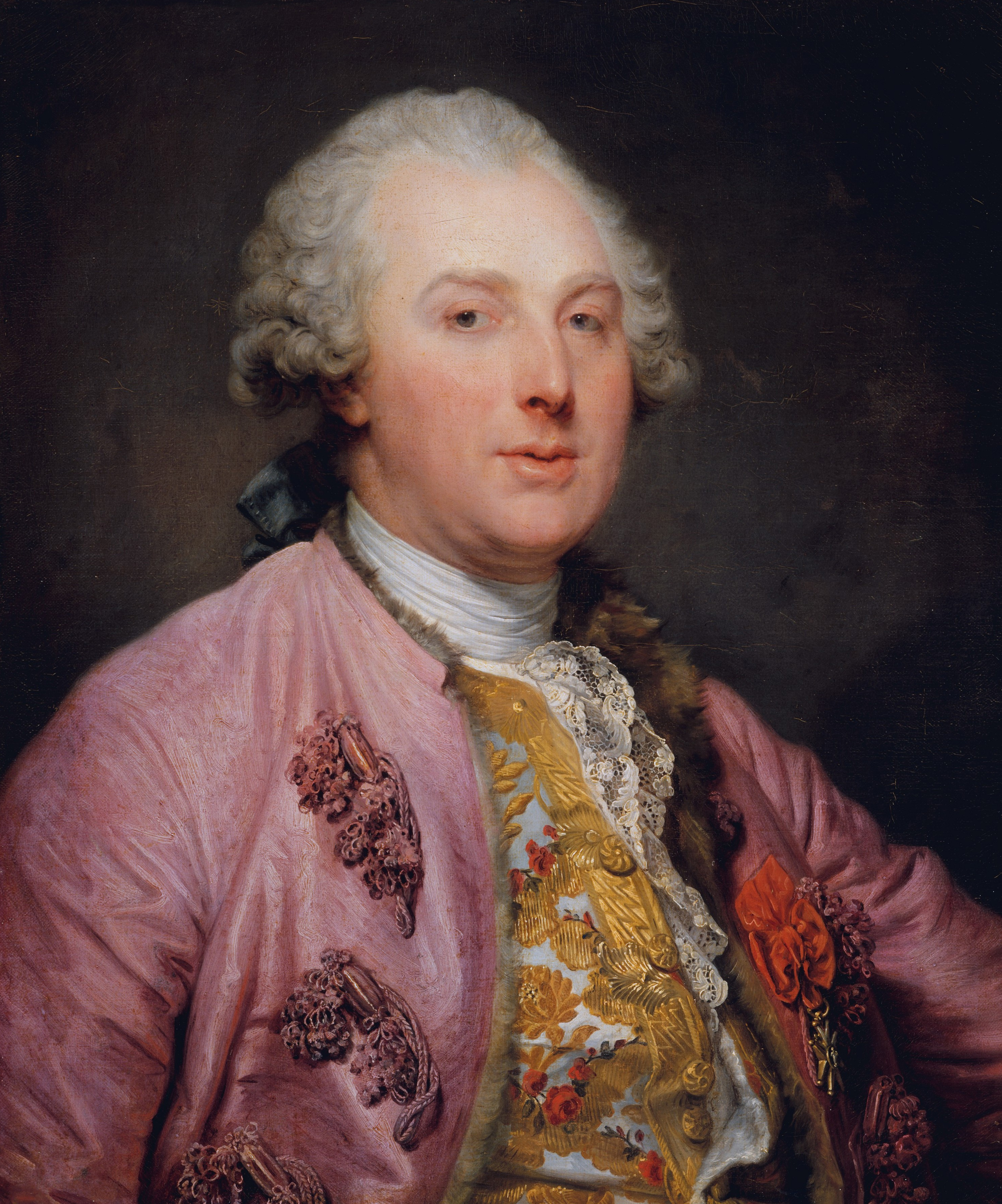
7 – c. 1763

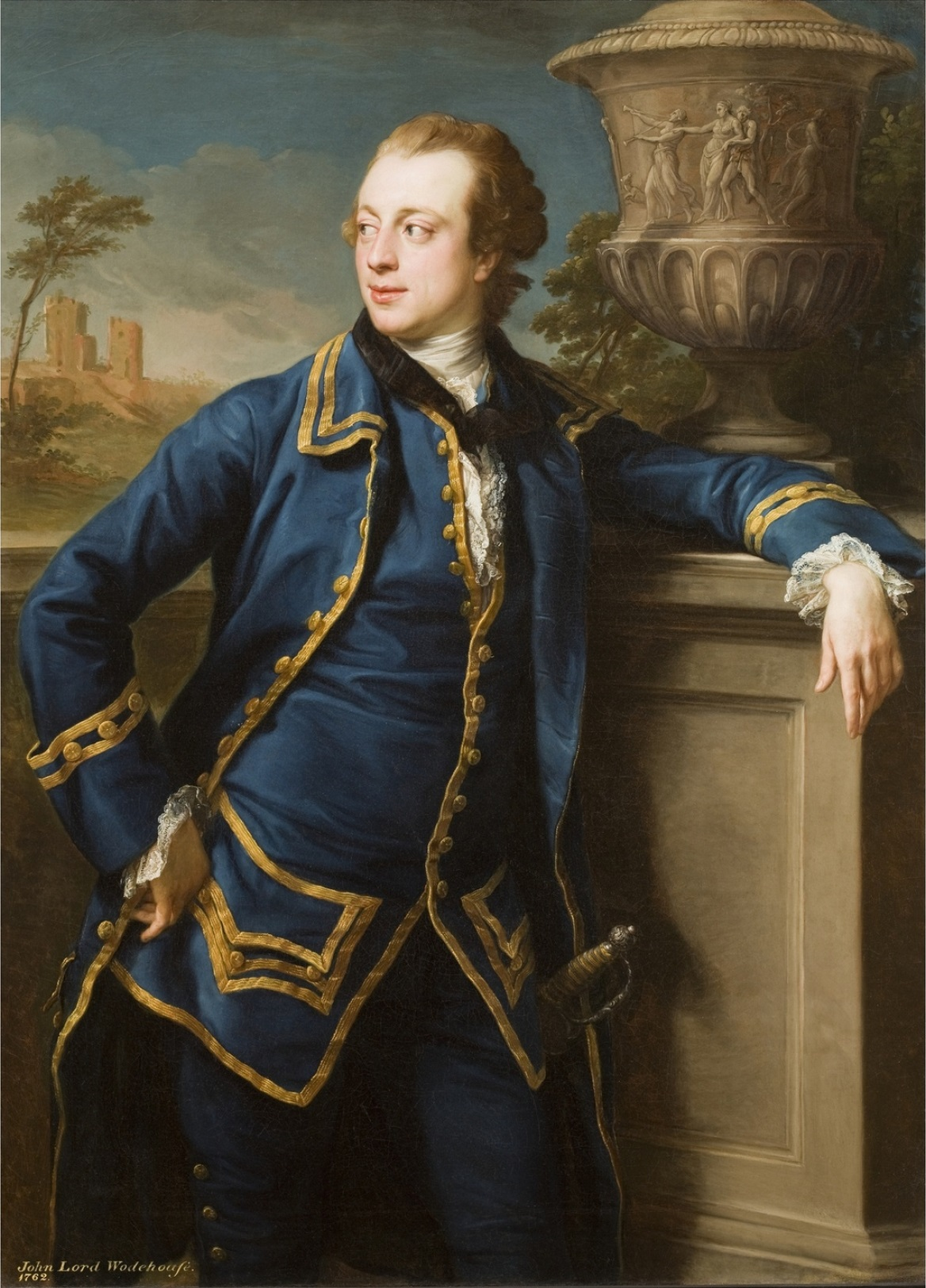
8 – 1764

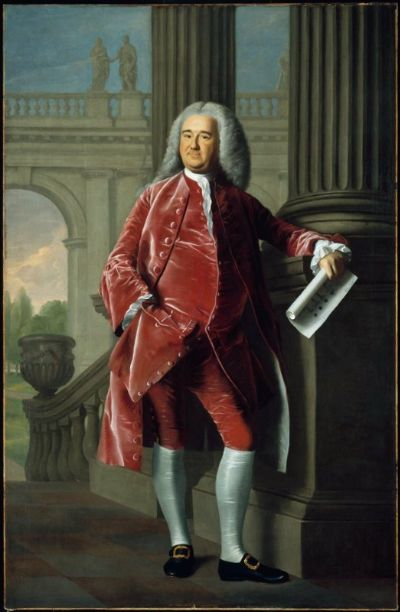
9 – 1764

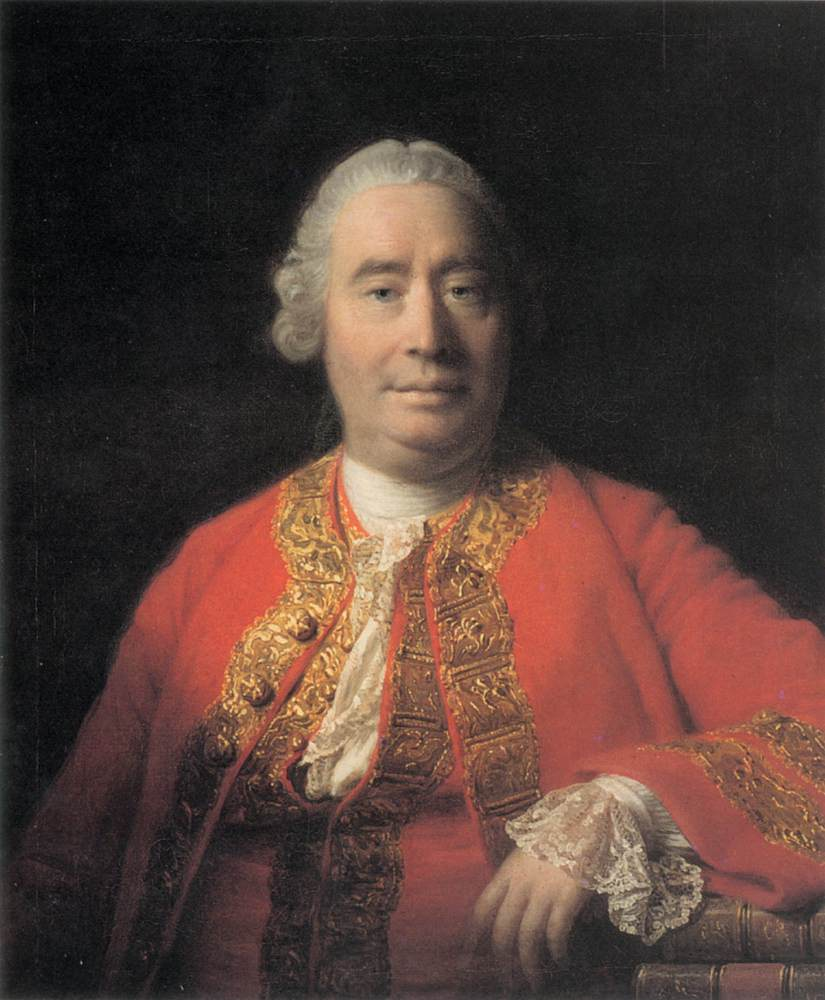
10 – 1766

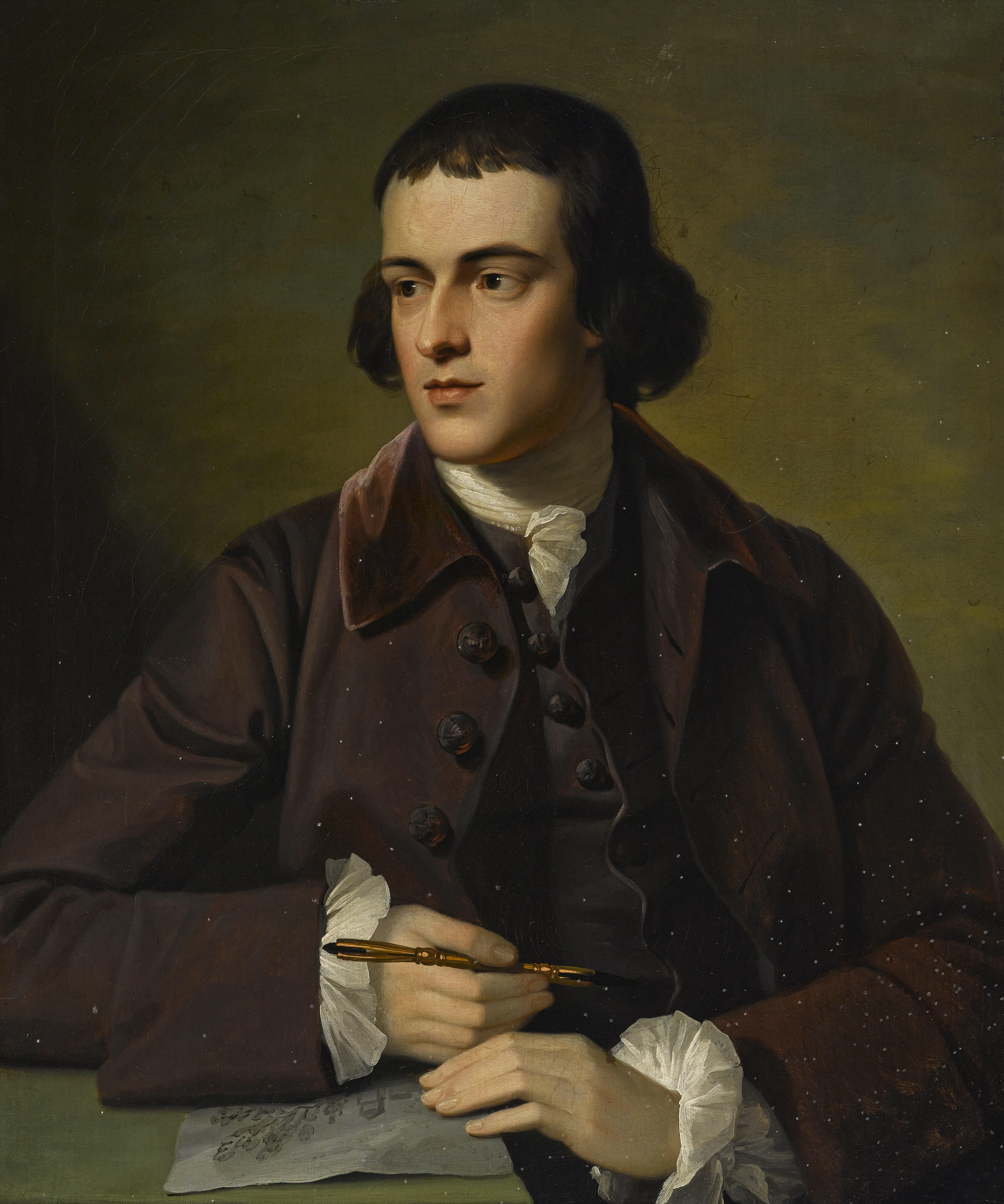
11 – 1766

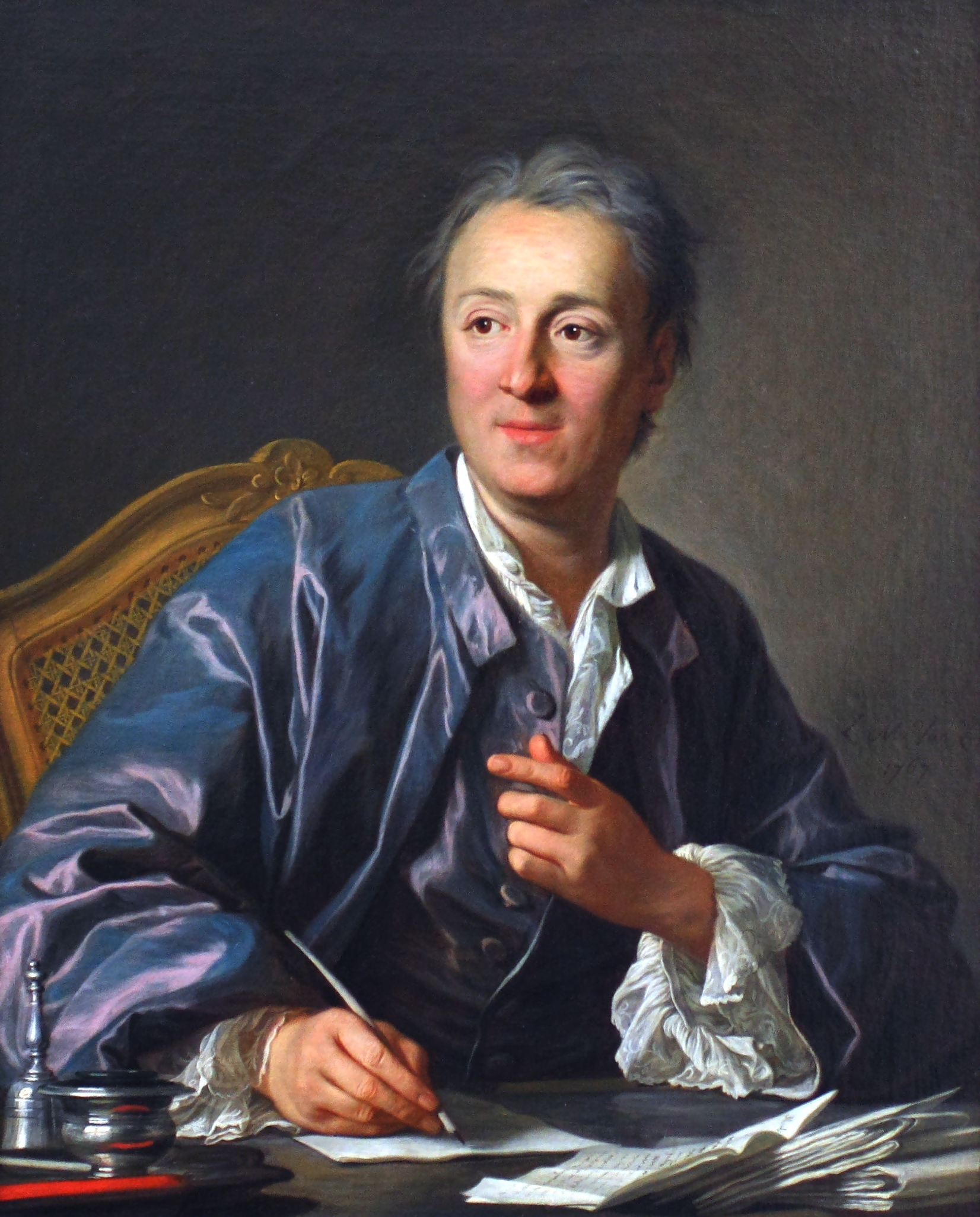
12 – 1767

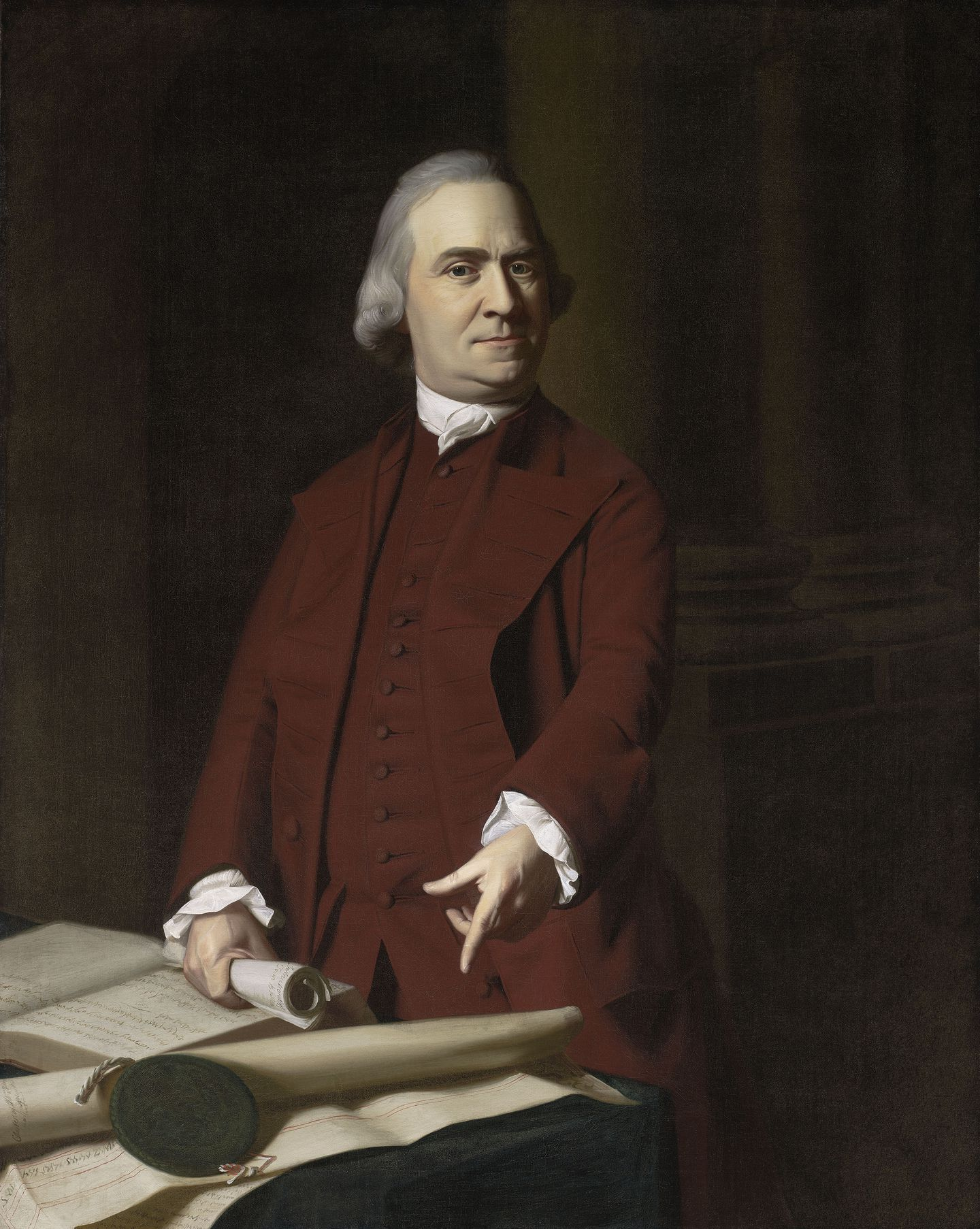
13 – 1772
1. Man's 3-piece suit has coat, waistcoat and breeches of cut, uncut and voided silk velvet, France, c. 1755. The waistcoat buttons match the coat buttons, but are smaller.
2. Portrait of George Frideric Handel in a dark red coat with deep cuffs worn over a long gold brocade vest or waistcoat. His shirt has full sleeves gathered at the wrists with ruffles, 1756.
3. Man's fitted double-breasted banyan, an at-home gown or informal coat, made in the Netherlands of Chinese silk, 1750–60.
4. Suit of 1761 features a dark blue coat and waistcoat with fine embroidery on the edges, deep cuffs, and pocket flaps. Hair is tied back but not powdered. The waistcoat reaches to mid-thigh.
5. M. Gilbert DesVoisins, Councillor of State in Ordinary wears a shirt with front and wrist ruffles of fine lace. 1761
6. Informal country clothes of 1760–62. The long collared coat without cuffs is a "frock".
7. Comte d'Angiviller wears a rose-coloured coat with a fur lining over a flowered white satin waistcoat with gold braid or embroidery. His shirt has a lace frill down the front. French fashion emphasizes rich fabrics over cut and tailoring, c. 1763.
8. Portrait of Lord Wodehouse wearing a deep blue coat, waistcoat and breeches, 1764.
9. Nathaniel Sparhawk of Maine wears a rose velvet suit with a collarless coat, 1764.
10. David Hume wears a reddish collarless dress coat and matching waistcoat trimmed with bands of gold. His shirt sleeves are gathered into wrist bands with tiny pleats—visible by his left hand—and have fine lace ruffles, 1766.
11. John Grey, third son of the Earl of Stamford, wears a brown coat and waistcoat over a linen shirt, 1766.
12. Denis Diderot wears a shot silk banyan over his waistcoat and shirt. The shirt fastens with buttons and buttonholes at the neck, details usually hidden by the stock, 1767.
13. Samuel Adams wears a plain coat with wide revers, a small stand-up collar, deep cuffs, and large pocket flaps. His shirt has small sleeve ruffles and is worn with a narrow stock, 1772.

== Children's fashion ==
During most of this period, the clothes worn by middle- and upper-class children older than toddlers continued to be similar to the clothes worn by adults, with the exception that girls wore back-fastening bodices and petticoats rather than open-fronted robes. Boys wore dresses until they were breeched.

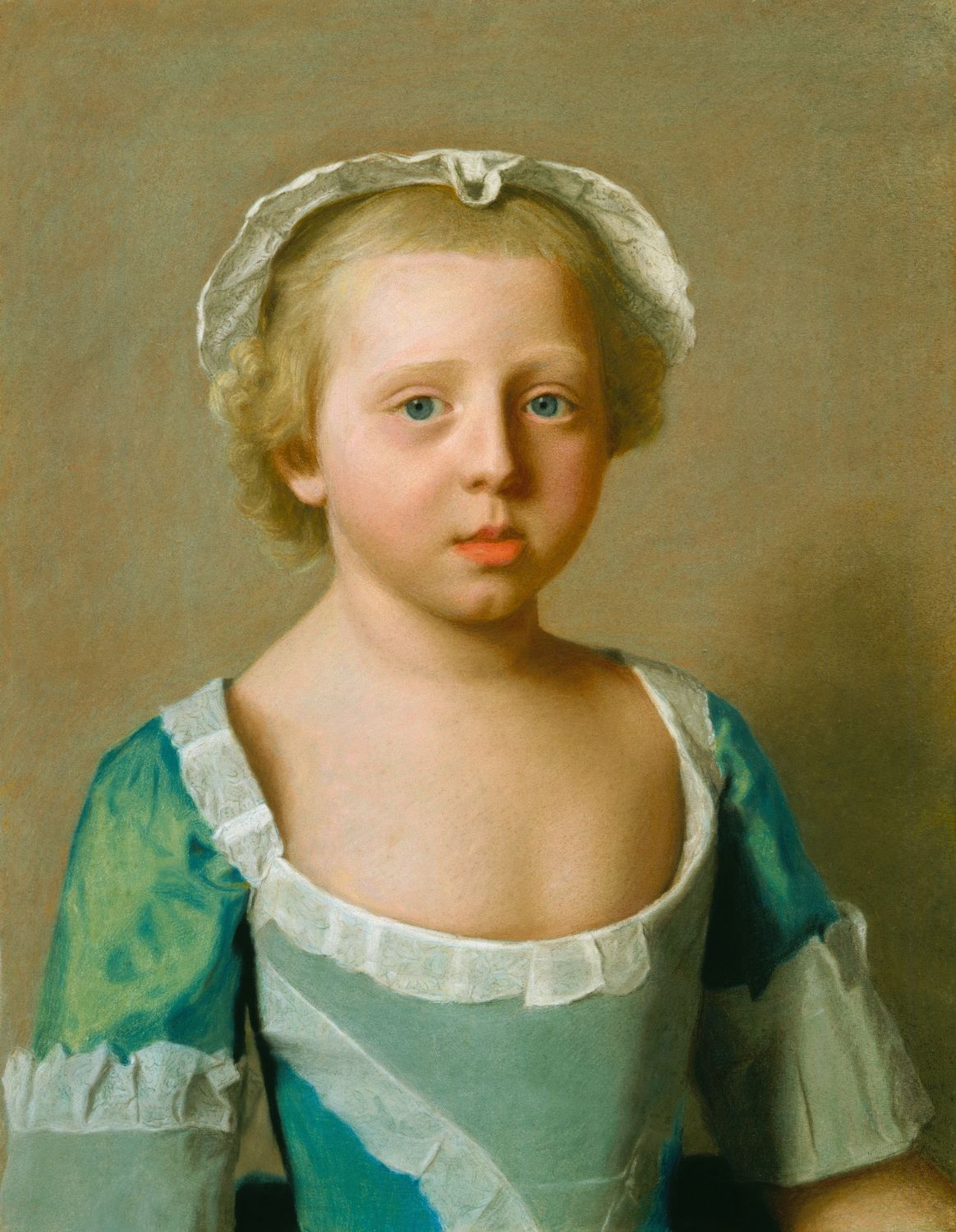
1 – 1754

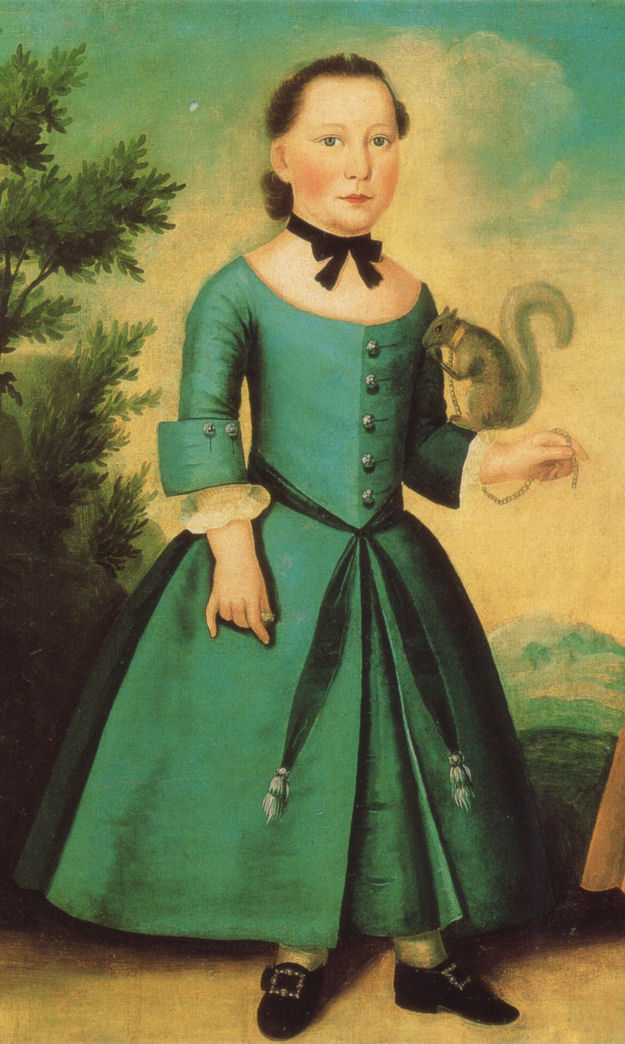
2 – 1755–60

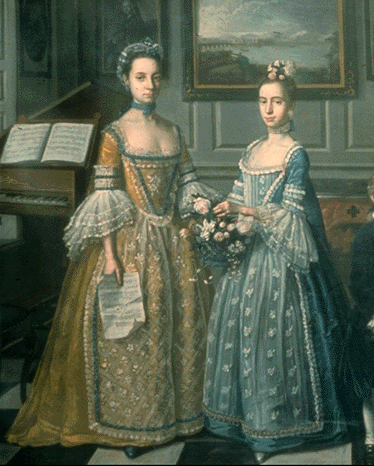
3 – 1762

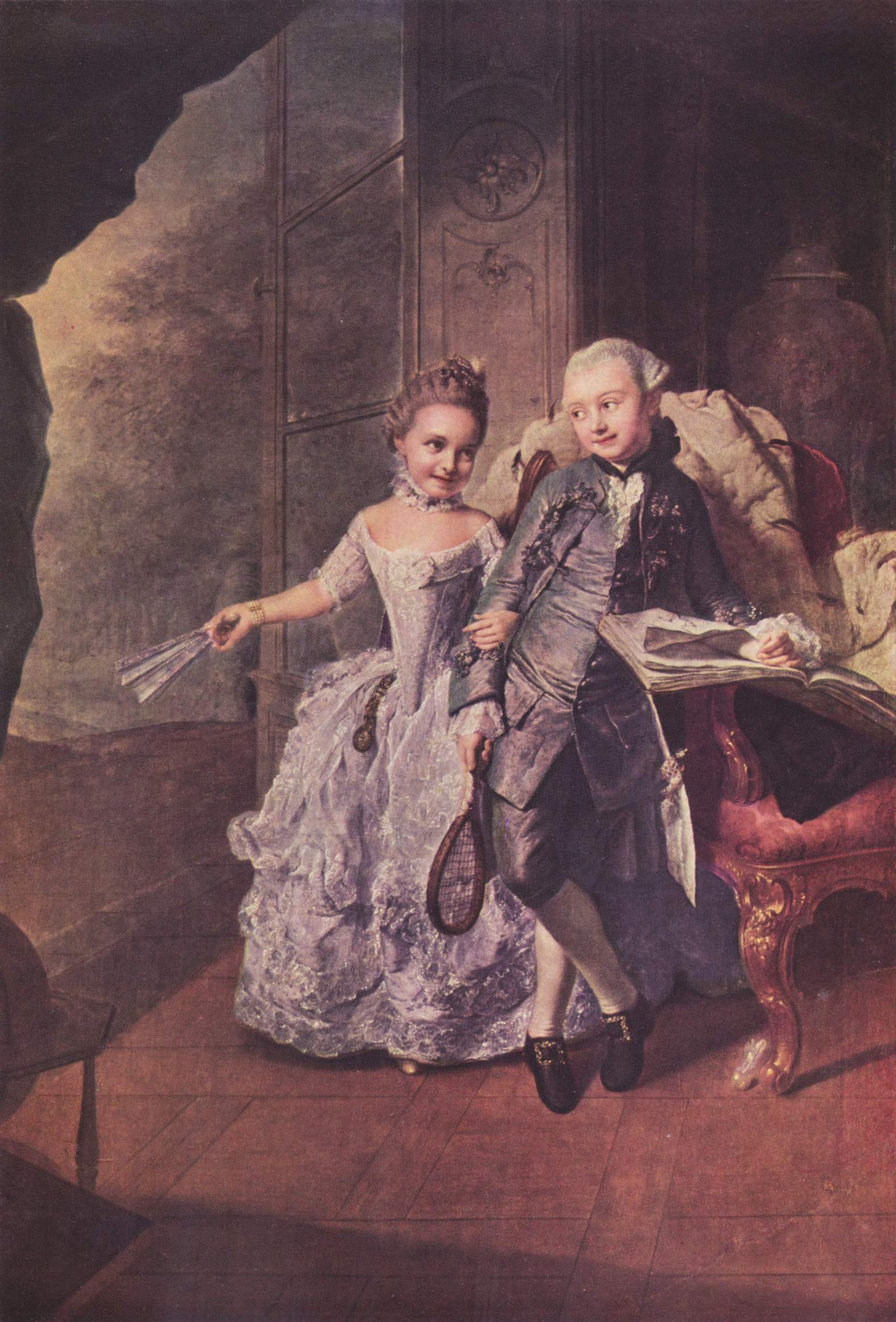
4 – 1764

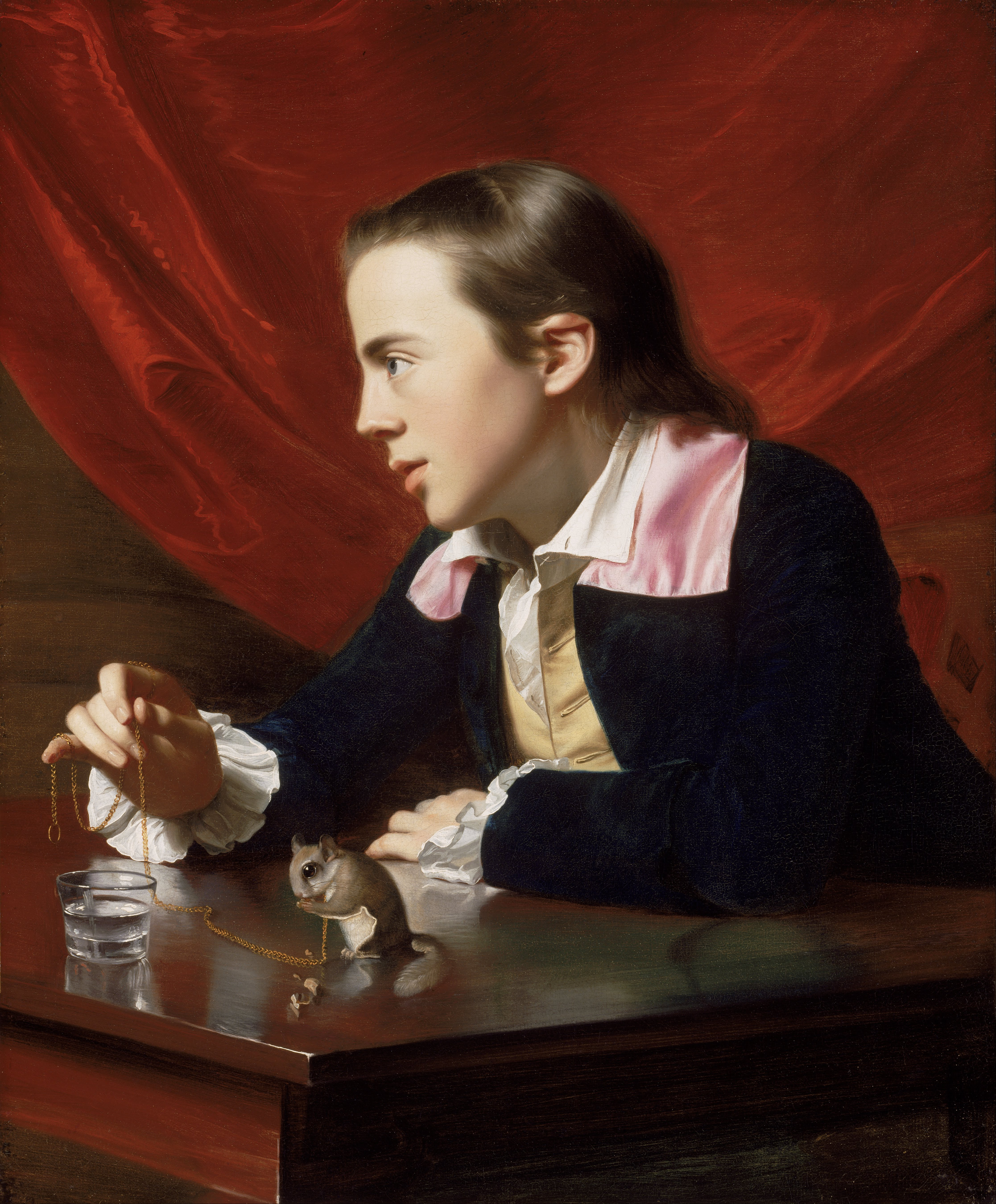
5 – 1765

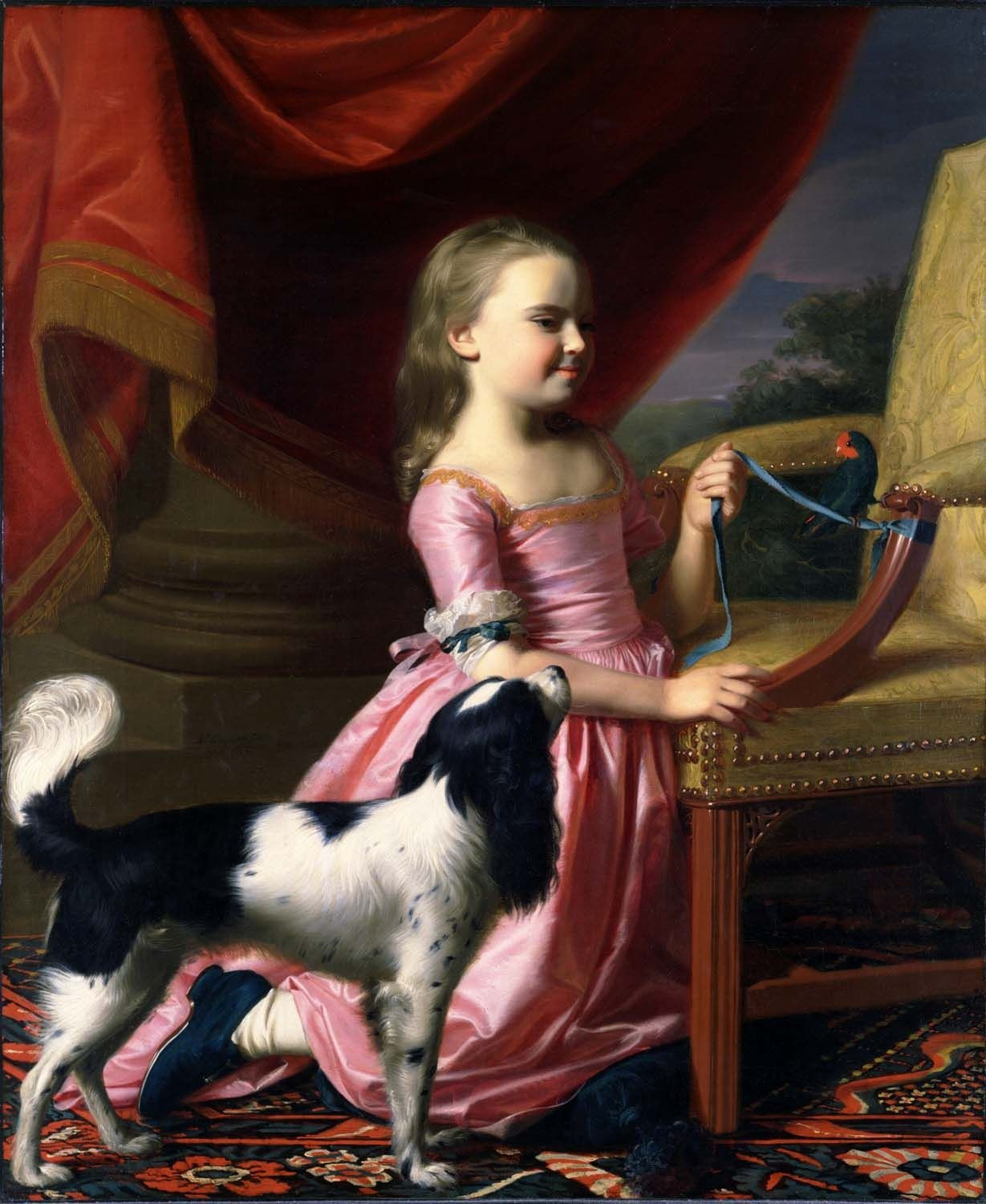
6 – 1767

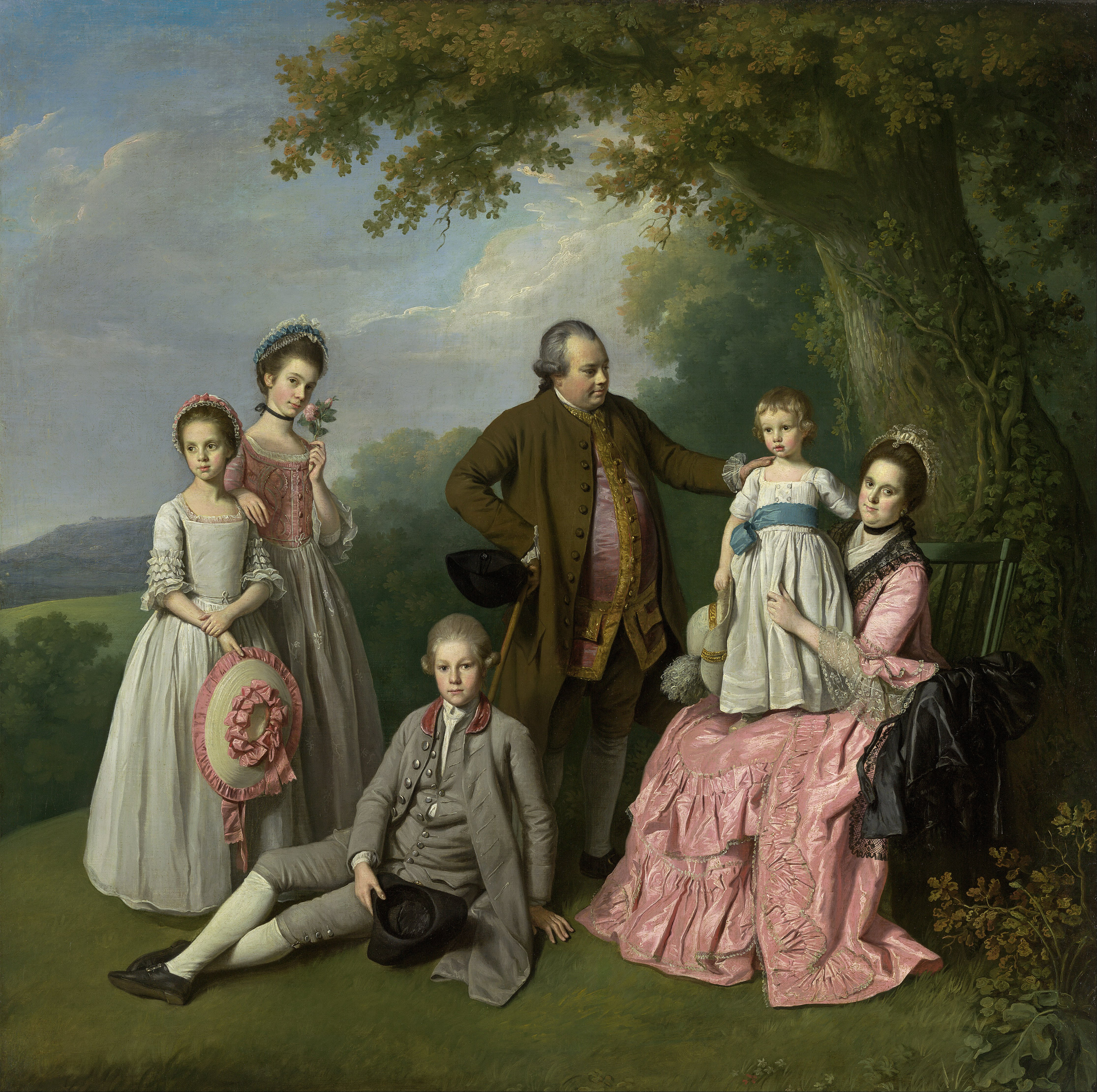
7 – 1769

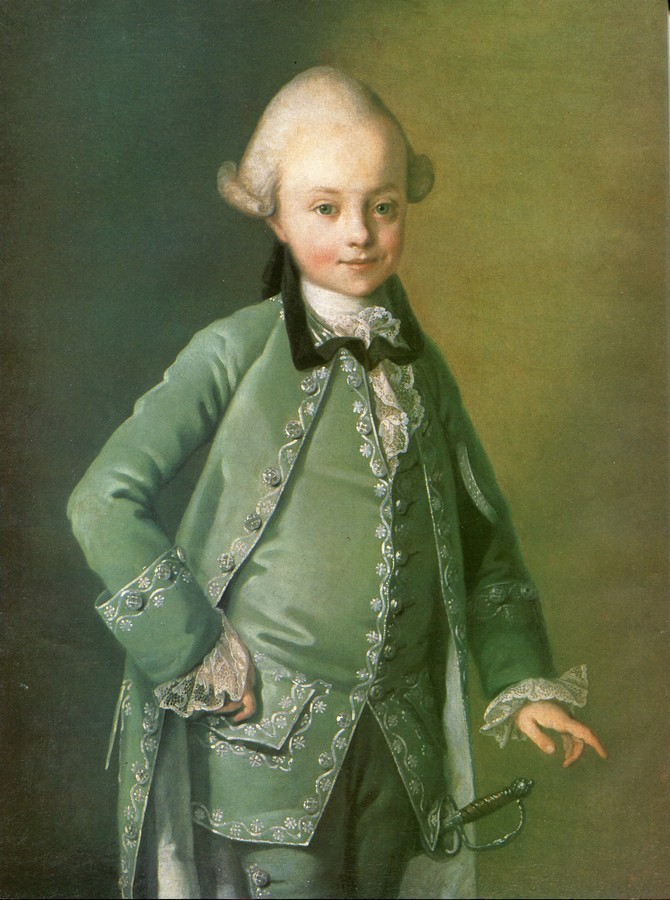
8 – c. 1770

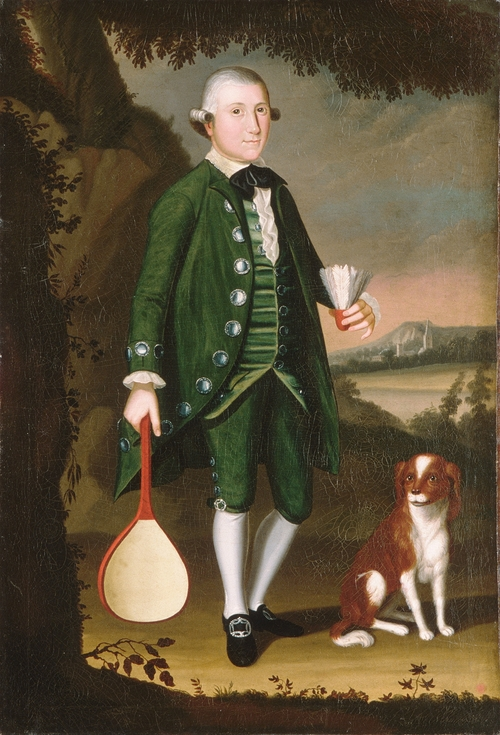
9 – 1770–75

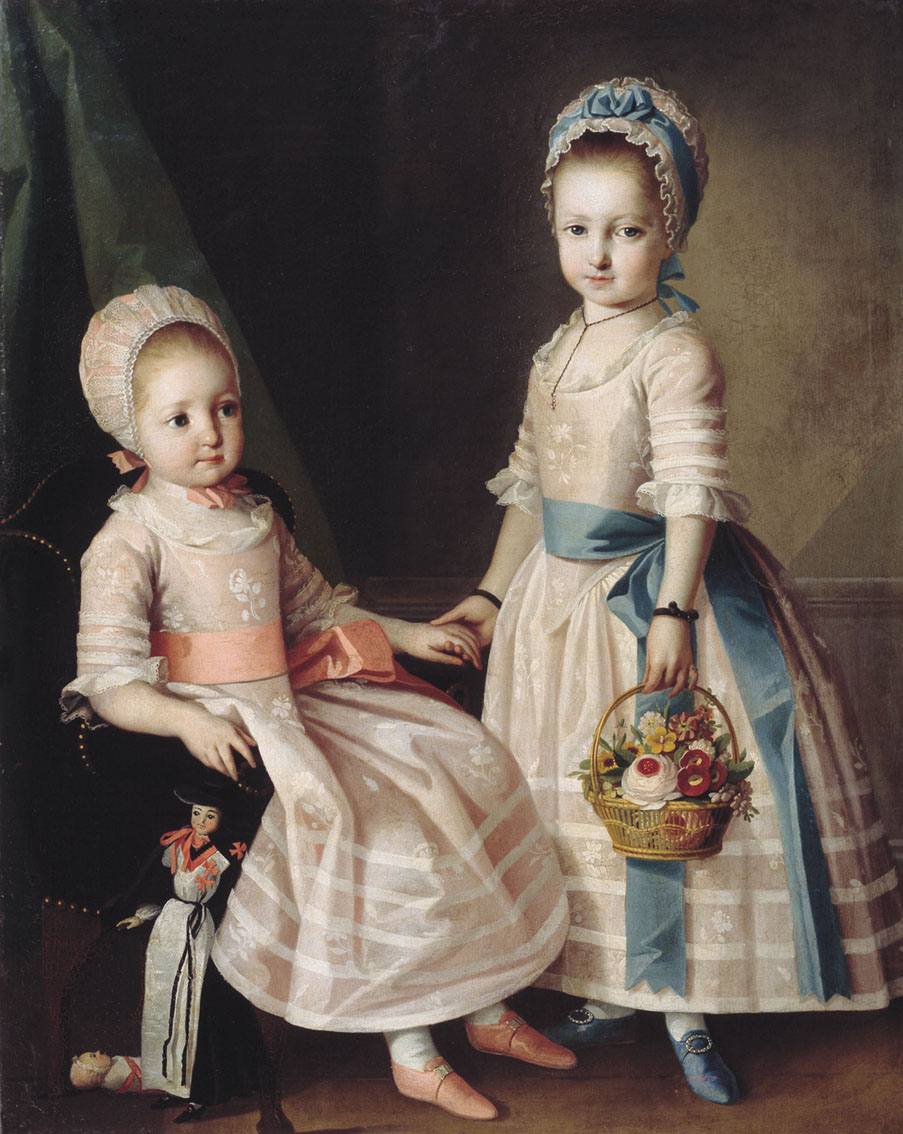
10 – 1772
1. Caroline Matilda of Great Britain, this portrait shows her as a child and the type of ensemble she would typically wear.
2. Boy's dress, c. 1755–60
3. Young Irish girls wear back-fastening bodices and sheer, embroidered aprons, 1762.
4. The future Frederick Francis I, Grand Duke of Mecklenburg-Schwerin and his sister Sophia Frederica wear the miniature versions of adult costume that were standard for upper-class children, 1764.
5. American boy wears a frock with a pink satin lining over a buff-colored waistcoat and a collared shirt with wrist frills, 1765.
6. An American girl of 1767 wears a pink satin back-fastening gown over a smock and black shoes with low heels.
7. The Pybus Family by Nathaniel Dance-Holland. The girls wear mobcaps and a straw hat. The teenage boy has powdered hair and wears a frock coat and knee length breeches. The youngest child wears a loose white frock with a cloth belt, 1769
8. Young Russian boy in court dress, with powdered hair and miniature sword, c. 1770.
9. Boy's suit of the early 1770s is worn with a collared shirt and a floppy bow at the neck.
10. Young girls with mobcaps.

== Working class clothing ==
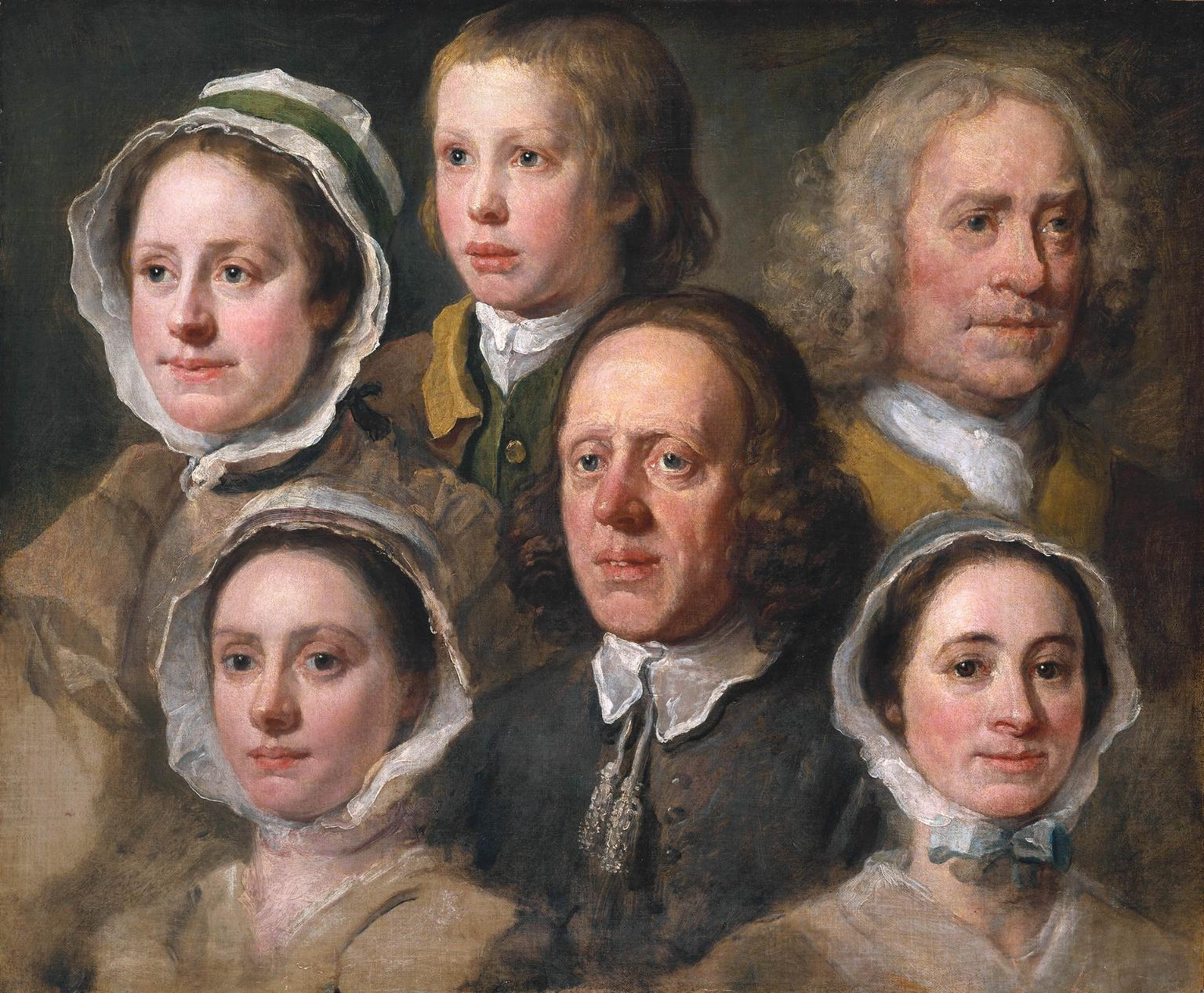
Portraits of William Hogarth's servants (England, 1750s)

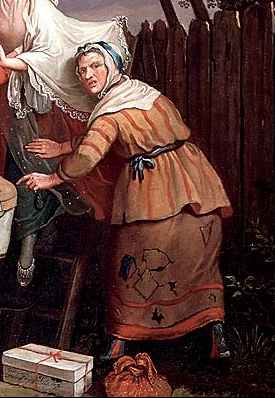
A working-class woman wears a short dress or bedgown, a patched and mended petticoat, and neckerchief (England, c. 1764)

Working-class people in 18th century England and America often wore the same garments as fashionable people—shirts, waistcoats, coats and breeches for men, and shifts, petticoats, and dresses or jackets for women—but they owned fewer clothes and what they did own was made of cheaper and sturdier fabrics. Working-class men also wore short jackets, and some, especially sailors, wore trousers rather than breeches. Smock-frocks were a regional style for men, especially shepherds. Country women wore short hooded cloaks, most often red. Both sexes wore handkerchiefs or neckerchiefs.

Men's felt hats were worn with the brims flat rather than cocked or turned up. Men and women wore shoes with shoe buckles—when they could afford them. Men who worked with horses wore boots.
