= Close-bodied gown =

18th-century dress style

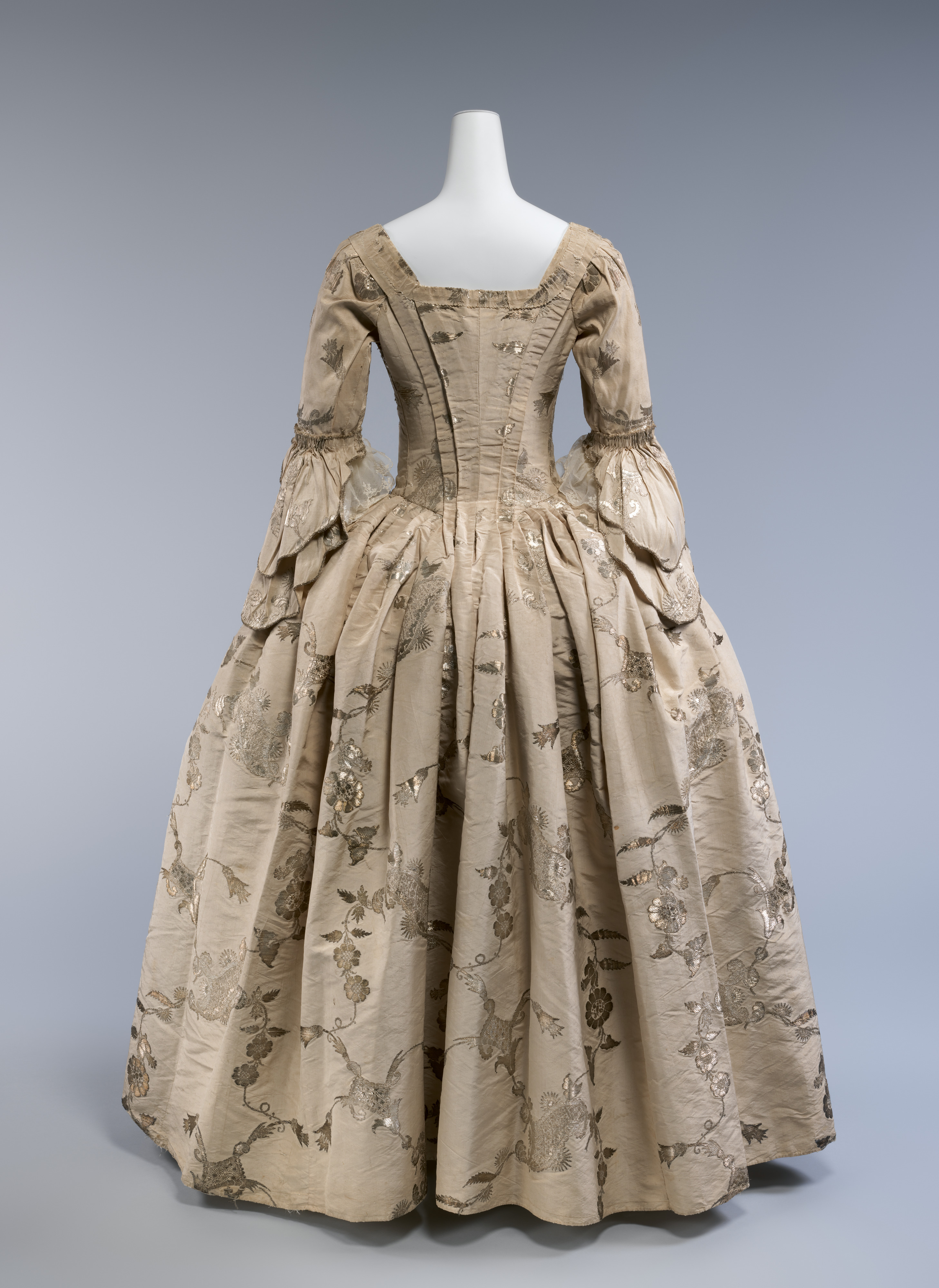
Rear view of a close-bodied gown or robe à l'anglaise of white silk decorated with metalwork embroidery, British, c.1747; altered 1770s, Metropolitan Museum of Art, 2014.138a, b

A close-bodied gown, English nightgown, or robe à l'anglaise was a women's fashion of the 18th century. Like the earlier mantua, from which it evolved, the back of the gown featured pleats from the shoulder, stitched down to mould the gown closely to the body until the fullness was released into the skirt.

Through the 1770s, the back pleats became narrower and closer to the center back, and by the 1780s these pleats had mostly disappeared and the skirt and bodice were cut separately.

The gown was open in front, to reveal a matching or contrasting petticoat, and featured elbow-length sleeves, which were finished with separate frills called engageantes.

== Gallery ==
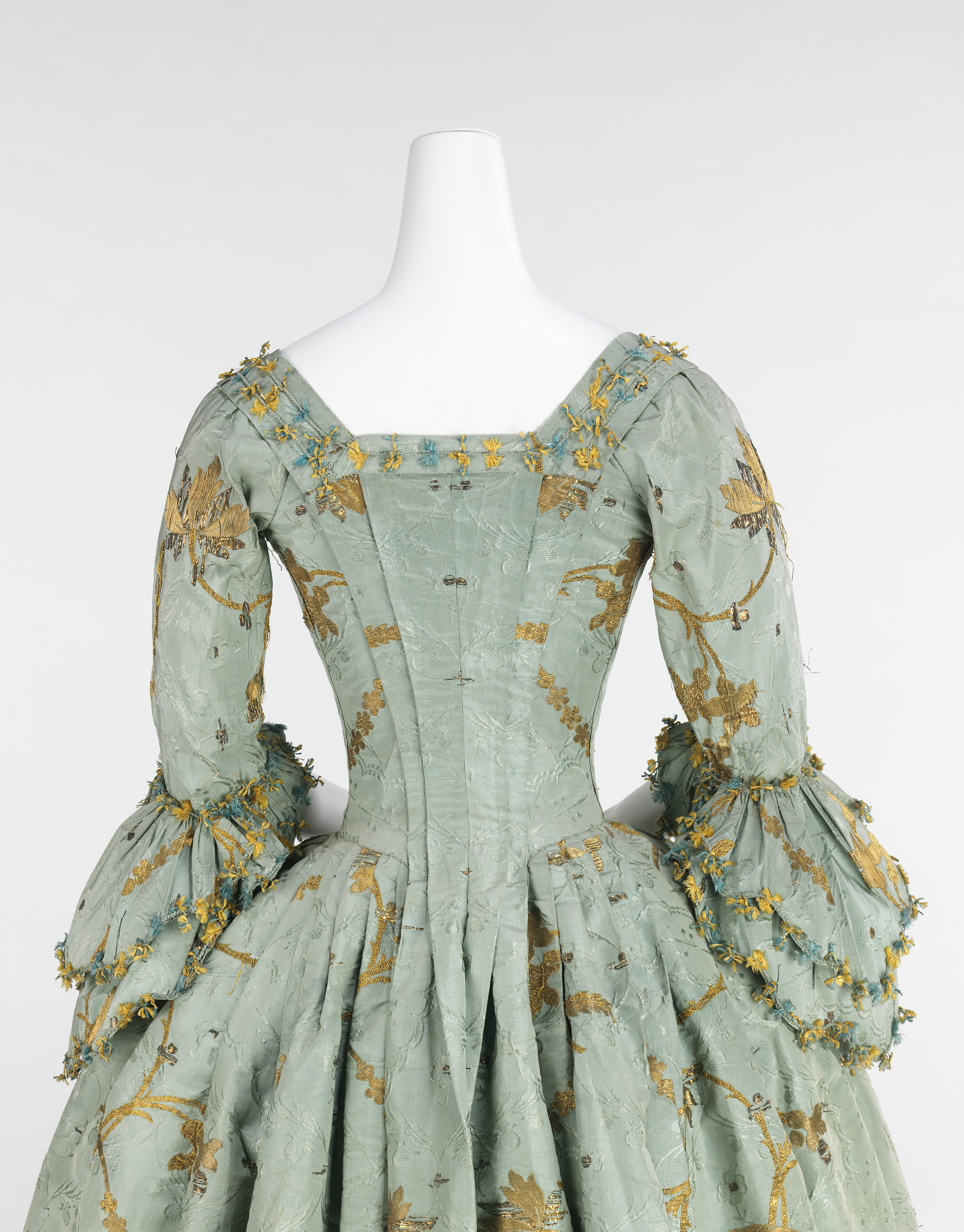
Rear view of robe a l'anglaise, 1770-75, British. Metropolitan Museum of Art

== See also ==
- 1700–1750 in fashion
- 1750–1795 in fashion
