= 1700–1750 in Western fashion =

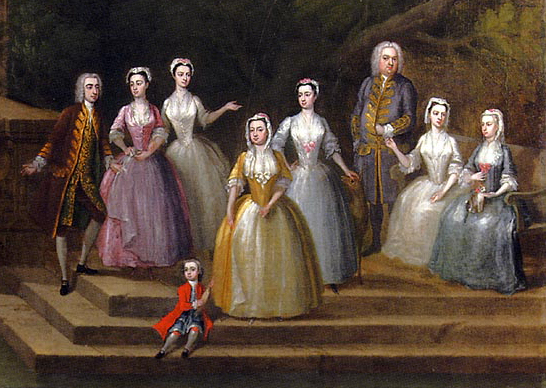
In this English family portrait, the ladies wear pastel-colored gowns with closed skirts and lace caps. Some wear sheer aprons. The lady on the right wears a mantua. The men's long, narrow coats are trimmed with gold braid. c.1730–1740

Fashion in the period 1700–1750 in European and European-influenced countries was characterized by a widening silhouette for both men and women following the tall, narrow look of the 1680s and 90s. The period corresponded with the late Baroque/Rococo visual styles. Natural hair and wigs were often powdered white to achieve the fashionable look. The costume of the eighteenth century was picturesque.

The period distinguished between full dress worn at court and for formal occasions, and undress or everyday, daytime clothes. As the decades progressed, fewer and fewer occasions called for full dress, which had all but disappeared by the end of the century.

Fashion designers became more popular during this period, as men and women were eager to be dressed in the latest trends and styles. Fashion magazines emerged during this era, originally aimed at educated readers, but quickly capturing the attention of lower classes with their colorful illustrations and up-to-date fashion news.

== Women's fashion ==
=== Gowns and dresses ===
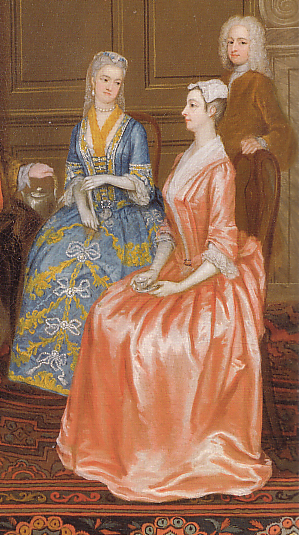
A rigid, upright posture with a sharp "break" at the bust is characteristic of the stiffly boned stays of the 1730s. These English ladies wear formal mantuas for tea.

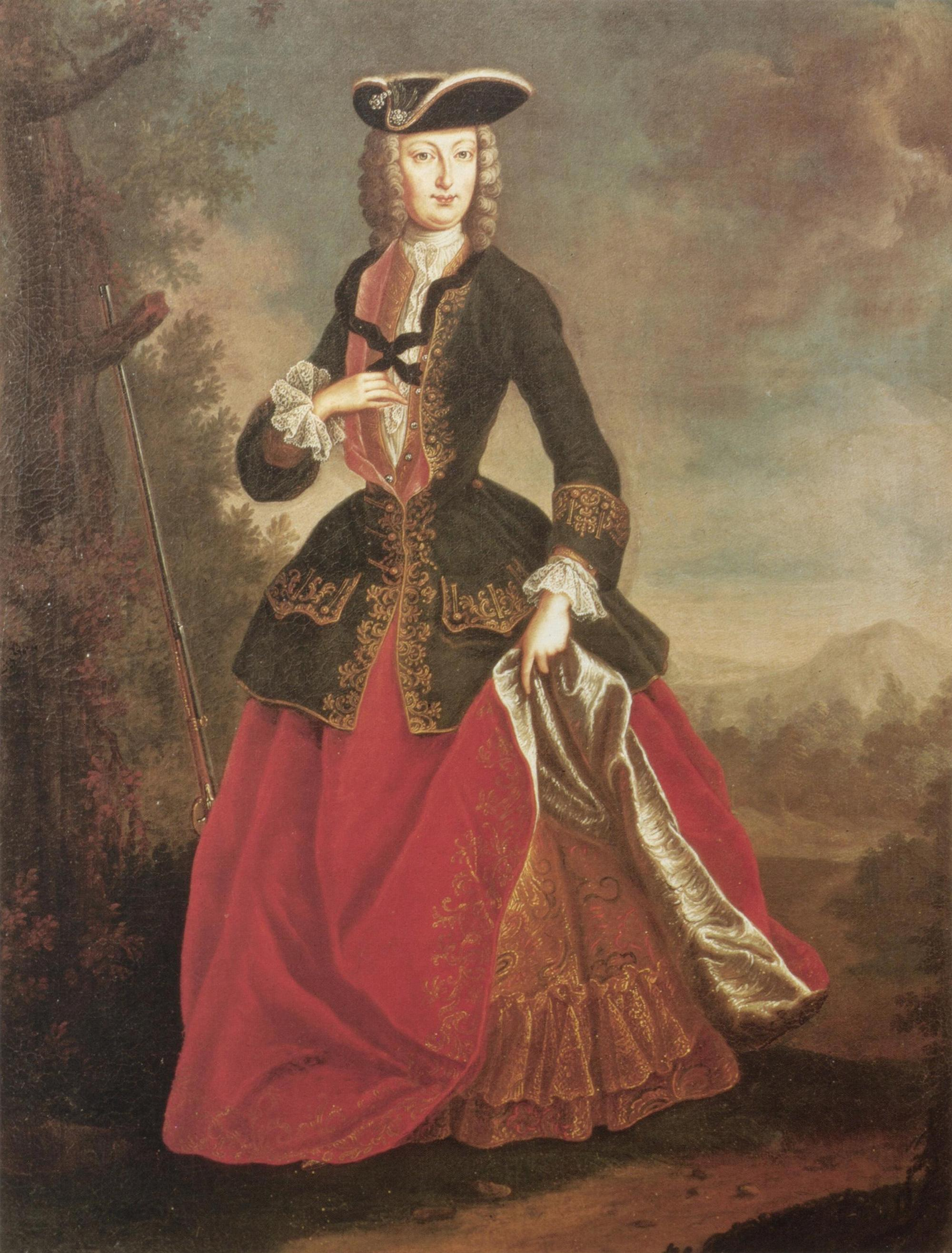
Empress Elisabeth Christine in riding costume.

In the early decades of the new century, formal dress consisted of the stiff-bodiced mantua. A closed (or "round") petticoat, sometimes worn with an apron, replaced the open draped mantua skirt of the previous period. This formal style then gave way to more relaxed fashions.

In the first decades of the century, a loose-fitted gown called a sacque was worn. The sacque was often made in heavy fabrics such as satin or velvet and was unfitted to the front or back. The fullness of the gown was arranged in loose box pleats called "Watteau pleats". The sacque was gradually replaced by the sack-back gown or robe à la française, the back of which continued to hang freely above a tightly-laced underbodice, thus fitting the front of the bodice to the figure. The robe à la française was worn with a decorated stomacher, which produced a characteristic square neckline. The gown was worn over wide panniers or a hoop skirt, and was lavishly trimmed with all manner of lace, ribbon, and flowers. These gowns were often made from lighter fabrics such as Indian cotton, silks, and damasks in pastel shades that gave off a warm, graceful and childlike appearance.

The less formal robe à l'anglaise, Close-bodied gown or "nightgown" could also have a pleated back, but these pleats would be sewn down to fit the back of the bodice to the body and waist. Other versions of the gown simply had a seam along the back of the bodice. This gown featured a snug bodice with a full skirt worn without panniers, usually cut a bit longer in the back to form a small train. The skirt of a robe à l'anglaise could be closed in front (a "round gown") or open to reveal a matching or contrasting petticoat.

Open-fronted bodices on either gown could be filled in with a decorative stomacher, and toward the end of the period a lace or linen kerchief called a fichu could be worn to fill in the low neckline.

Sleeves were bell- or trumpet-shaped, and caught up at the elbow to show the frilled or lace-trimmed sleeves of the shift (chemise) beneath. Sleeves became narrower as the period progressed, with a frill at the elbow, and elaborate separate ruffles called engageantes were tacked to the shift sleeves, in a fashion that would persist into the 1770s.

Necklines on dresses became deeper as time went on allowing for greater display of ornamentation on the neck area. A thick band of lace was often sewn onto the neckline of a gown with ribbons, flowers, and/or jewels adorning the lace. Jewelry such as strings of pearls, ribbons, or lace frills were tied high on the neck. Finally, one other large element of 18th century women's dress wear became the addition of the frilled neckband, a separate piece from the rest of the dress. This ornament was popularized sometime around 1730 .

=== Underwear ===
The stays of the early 18th century were long-waisting and cut with a narrow back, wide front, and shoulder straps; the most fashionable stays pulled the shoulders back until the shoulder blades almost touched. The resulting silhouette, with shoulders thrown back, very erect posture and a high, full bosom, is characteristic of this period and no other.

Skirts were worn over small, domed hoops, called panniers, in the 1730s and early 1740s. Depending on the occasion, these panniers varied in size. Smaller hoops were worn in everyday settings and larger hoops for more formal occasions, which later widened to as much as three feet to either side at the French court of Marie Antoinette.

The shift (chemise) or smock had full sleeves early in the period and tight, elbow-length sleeves in the 1740s as the sleeves of the gown narrowed.

Some women wore drawers (underpants) in England. For instance, as early as 1676 inventory of Hillard Veren had "3 pair of women drawers". Although they are not common in English or New England inventories during the 17th and 18th century.

Woolen waistcoats were worn over the corset and under the gown for warmth, as were petticoats quilted with wool batting.

Free-hanging pockets were tied around the waist and were accessed through pocket slits in the gown or petticoat.

Loose gowns, sometimes with a wrapped or surplice front closure, were worn over the shift (chemise), petticoat and stays (corset) for at-home wear, and it was fashionable to have one's portrait painted wearing these fashions.

=== Outerwear ===
Riding habits consisted of a fitted, thigh- or knee-length coat similar to those worn by men, usually with a matching petticoat. Ladies wore masculine-inspired shirts and tricorne hats for riding and hunting.

When outdoors, ladies also wore elbow-length capes, often lined with fur for warmth.

=== Fabrics and colors ===
In the early years of this period, pastel silk hoods and light colors became fashionable at the French court for mature women, under the influence of Madame de Maintenon. Younger women also wore light or bright colors, but the preference was for solid-colored or floral silks with ornamentation.

Gradually, trim in the form of applied lace and fabric robings (strips of ruched, gathered or pleated fabric) replaced the plain style. Ribbon bows, lacing, and rosettes became popular, as did boldly patterned fabrics. Silk gowns and stomachers were often intricately embroidered in floral and life motifs, demonstrating great attention to detail and care for an accurate portrayal of nature. A mid-century vogue for striped fabrics had the stripes running different directions on the trim and the body of the gown.

Chintz, Indian cotton fabric with block-printed imaging on a white base, was wildly fashionable. Bans against their importation to protect the British silk, linen and woolen industries did nothing to reduce their desirability. Brocaded silks and woolens had similar colorful floral patterns on light-colored grounds. Blends of wool and silk or wool and linen (linsey-woolsey) were popular. Until the 1730s, European textiles were of inferior quality that could not match the complex fashionable designs of Indian calicoes. Europe was able to produce high quality petit teints (colors that faded with light and washing), but they were unable to produce grand teints (permanent colors resistant to light and wear).

=== Footwear and accessories ===
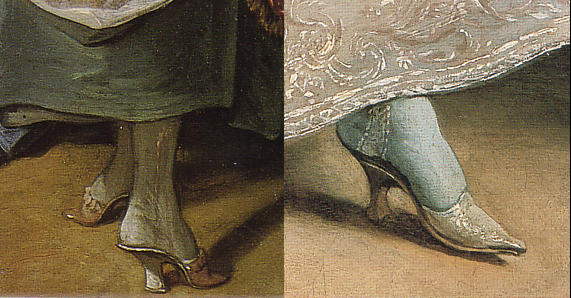
Shoes of 1742 (left) and 1731 (right).

The shoe of the previous period with its curved heel, squarish toe, and tie over the instep gave way in the 1710s to a shoe with a high, curved heel. Backless mules were worn indoors and out (but not on the street). Toes were now pointed. This style of shoe would remain popular well into the next period. Shoes at the time had many variations of decoration, some even included metal wrapped threads.

Women, particularly in France, began wearing a boutonnière, or a small bouquet of fresh flowers in a "bosom bottle." About four inches in length, these glass or tin bottles were small enough to discreetly tuck into the bosom or hair, but also just large enough to contain water to keep the flowers from wilting.

=== Makeup ===
An 18th-century toilette began with a heavy white foundation made from white lead, egg white, and a variety of other substances. This was overlaid with white powder (typically potato or rice powder), rouge, and deep red or cherry lip color.

Tiny pieces of fabric, known as patches, in the shapes of dots, hearts, stars, etc. were applied to the face with adhesive. The fashion is thought to have originated as a way of disguising pox scars and other blemishes, but gradually developed coded meanings. A patch near the mouth signified flirtatiousness; one on the right cheek denoted marriage; one on the left cheek announced engagement; one at the corner of the eye signified a mistress.

=== Style gallery ===
==== 1700–1730s ====
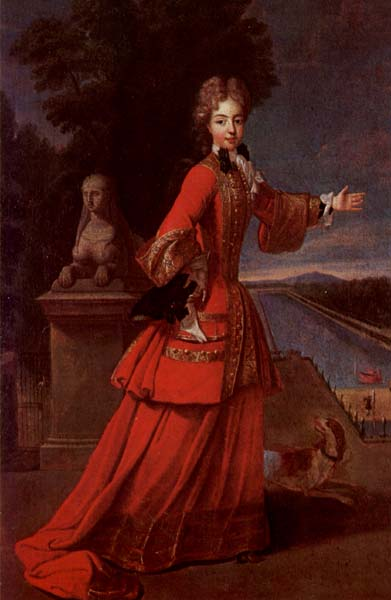
1 – c. 1700

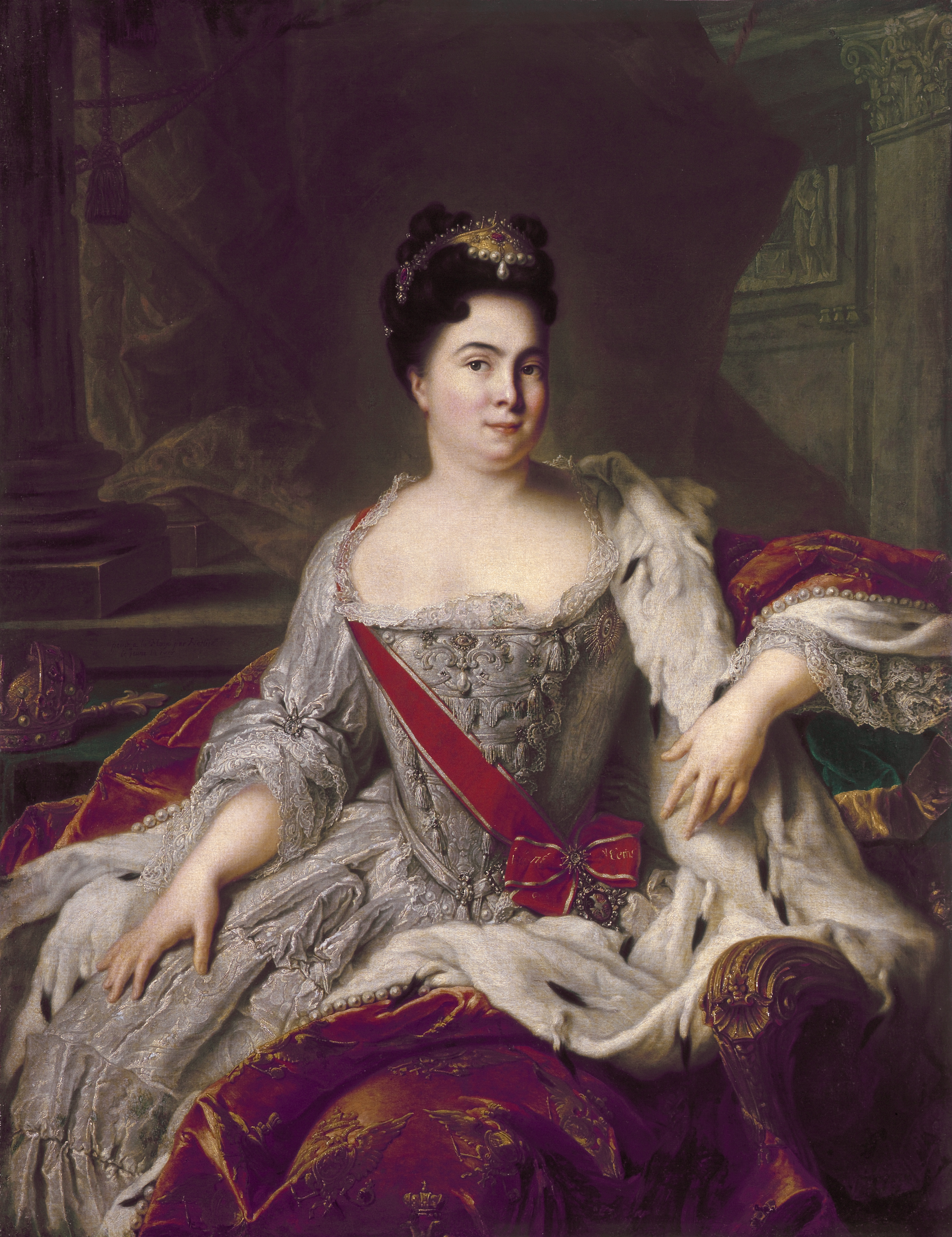
2 – 1717

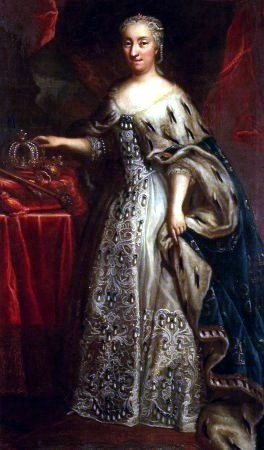
3 - 1718

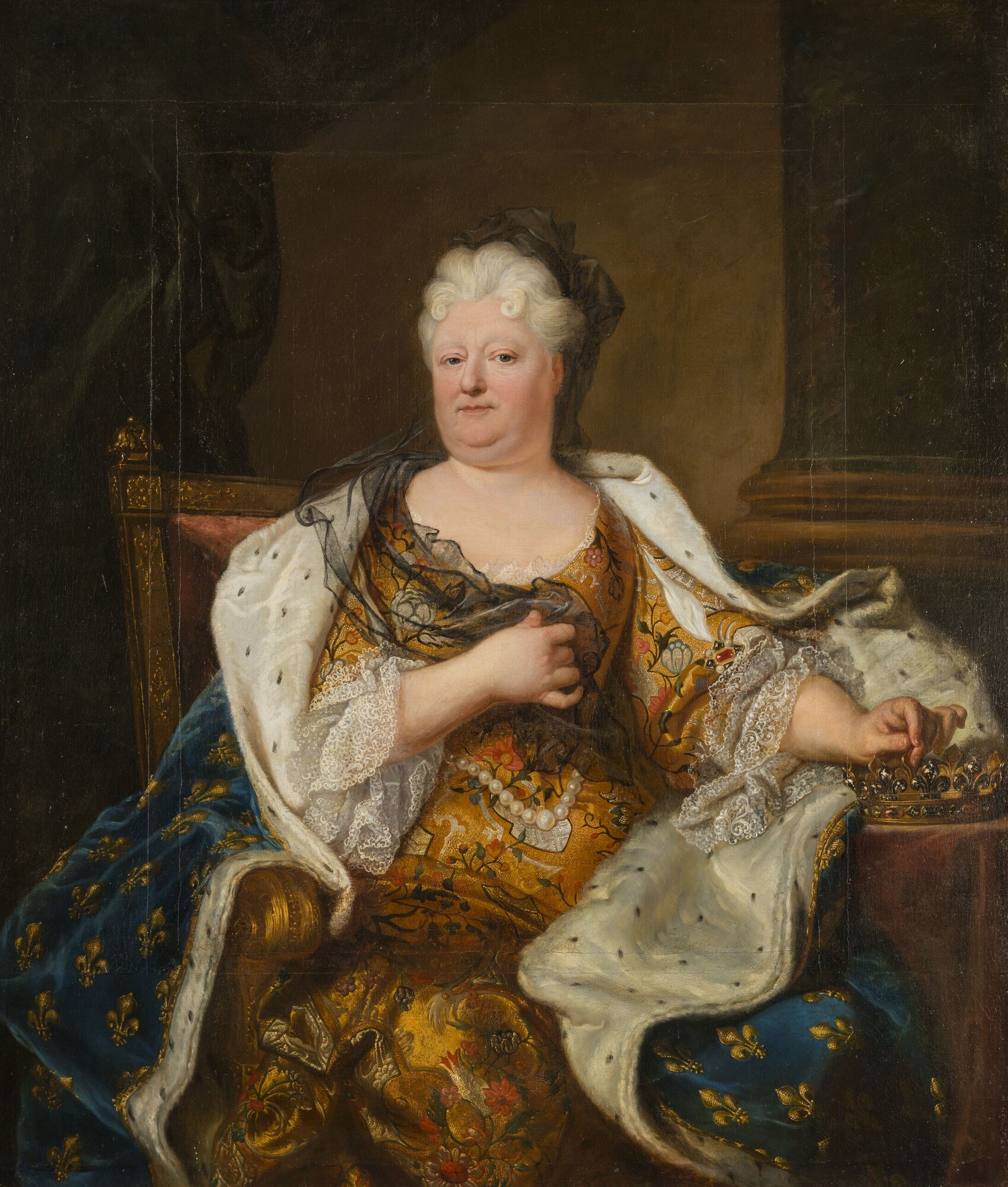
4 – c. 1719

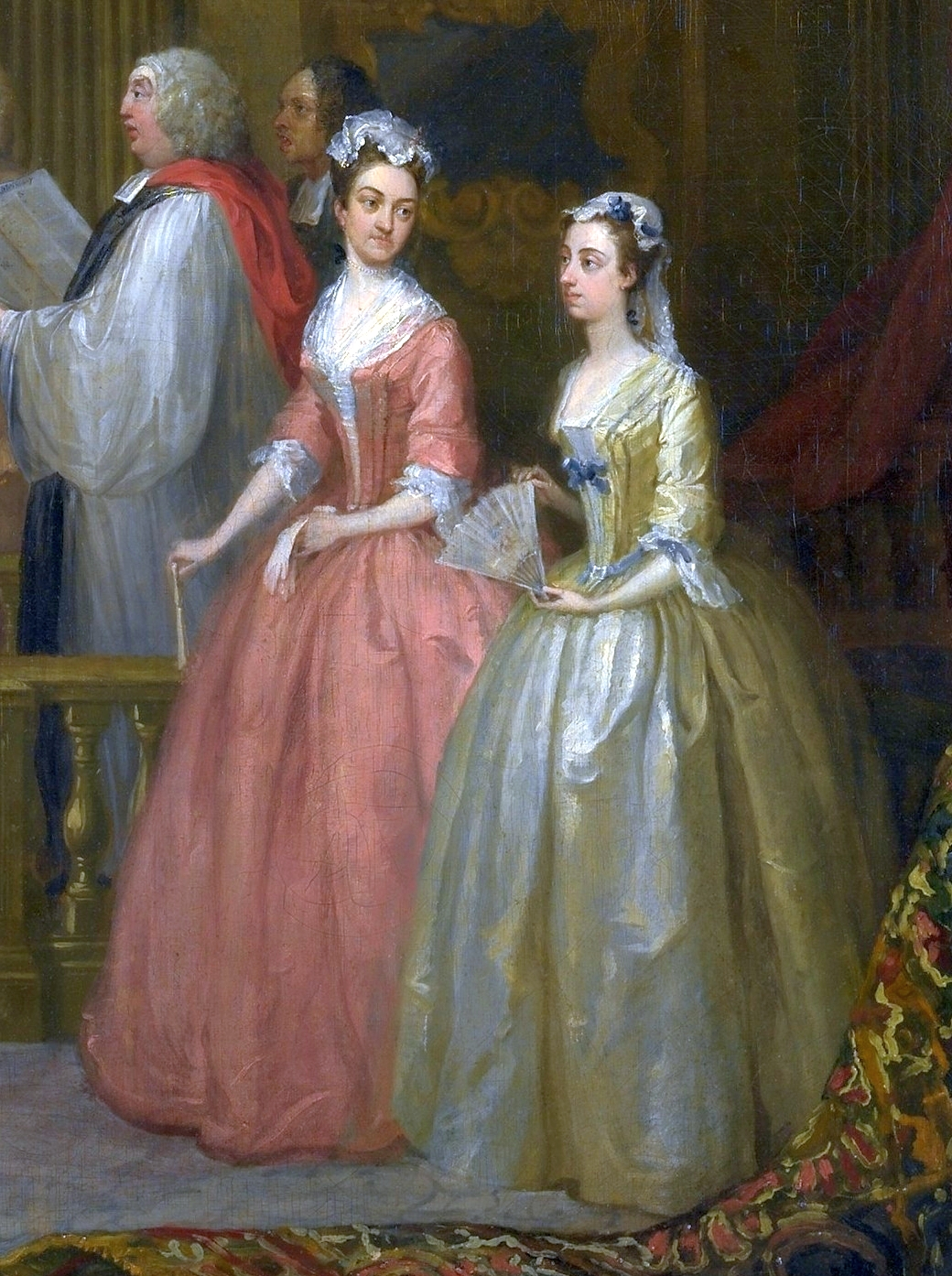
5 – 1729

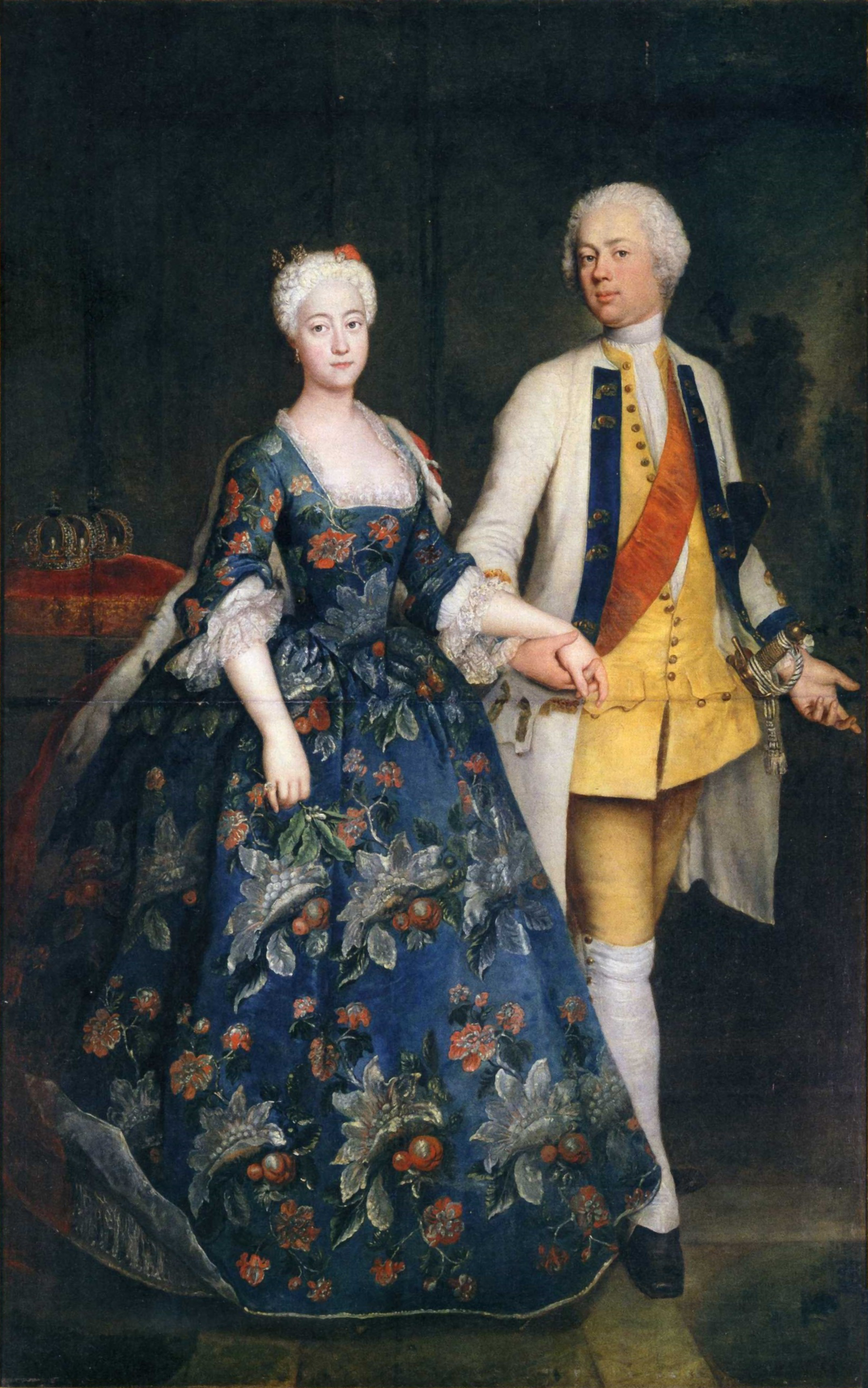
6 – 1734

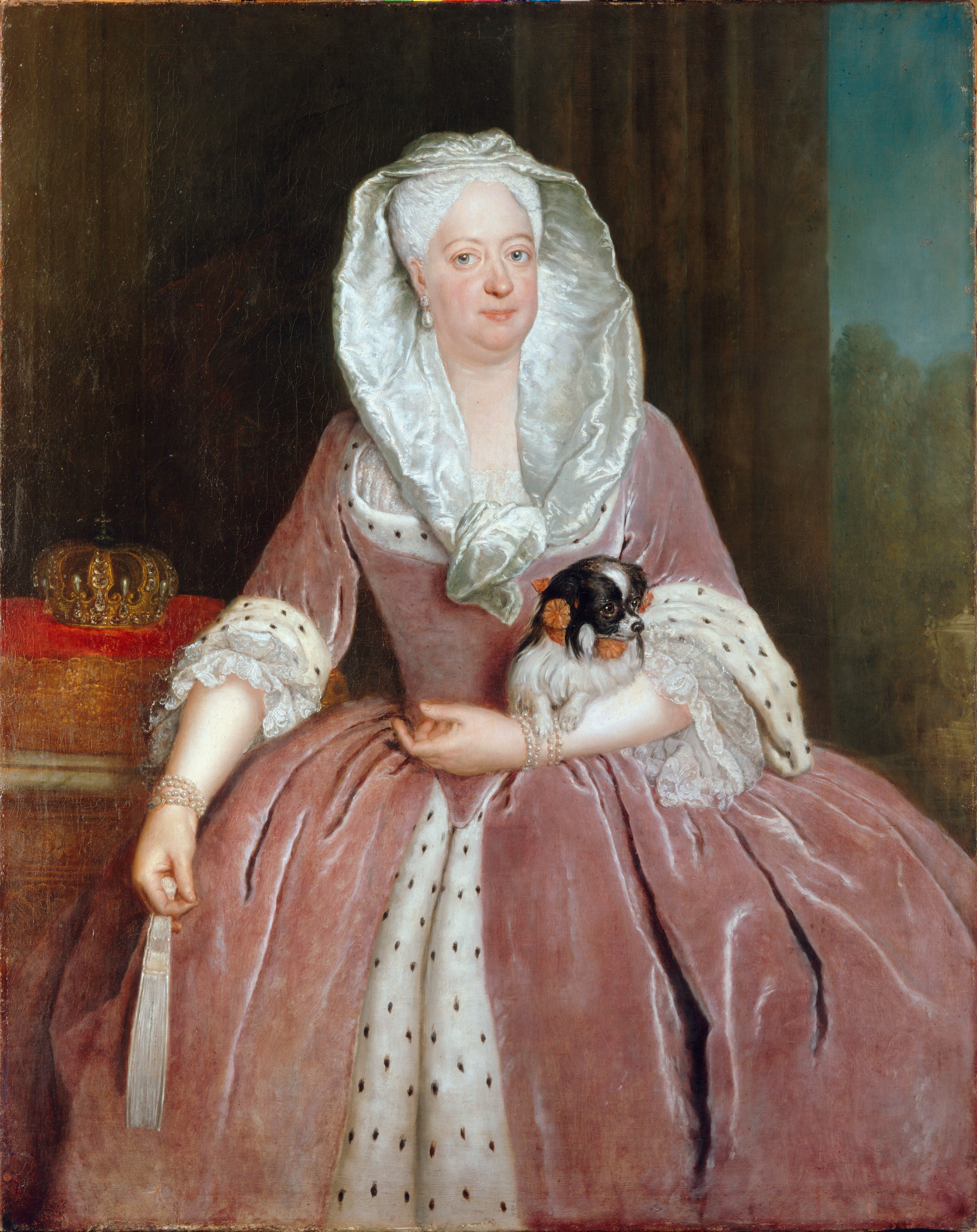
7 – 1737

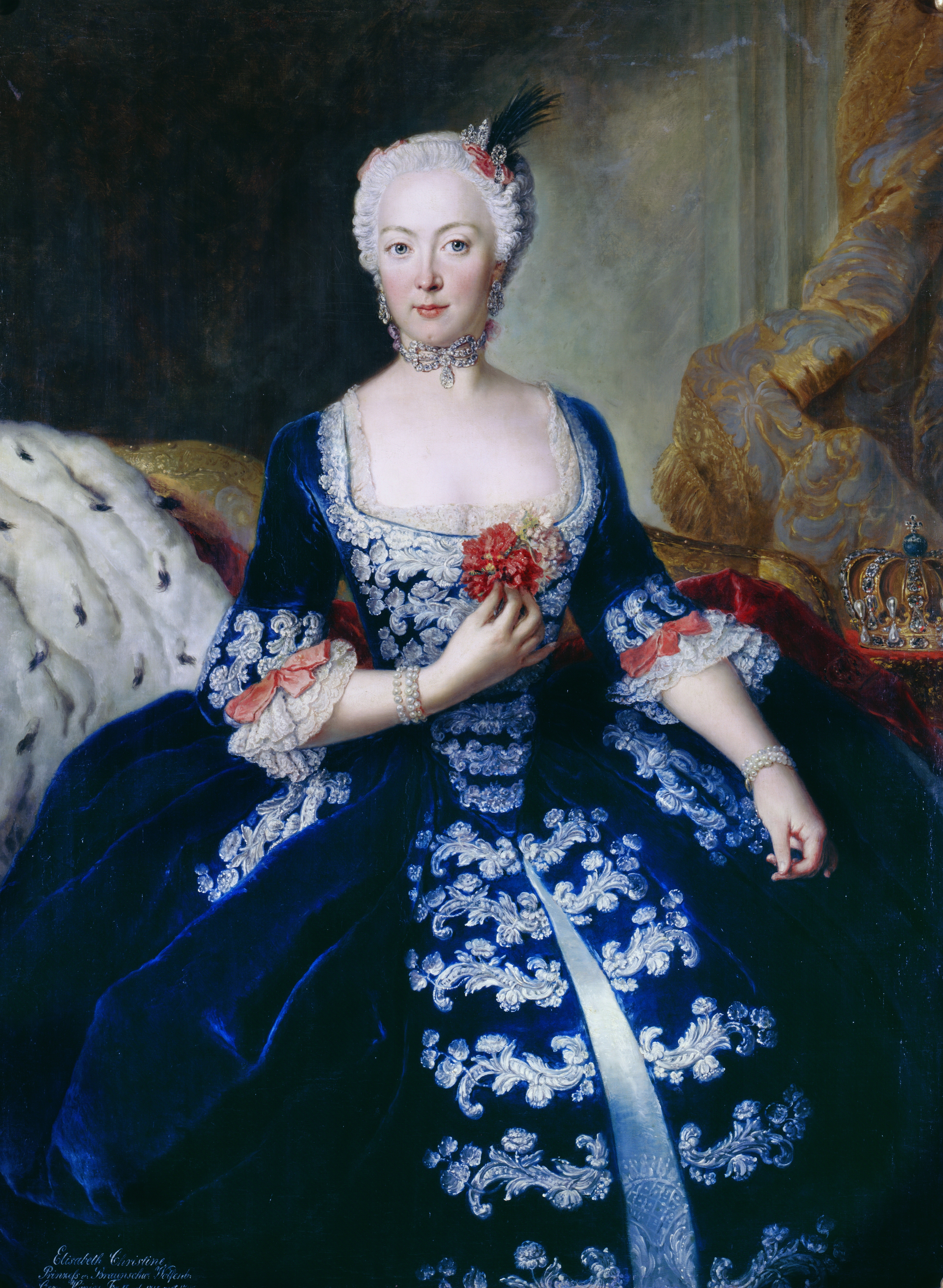
8 – 1739

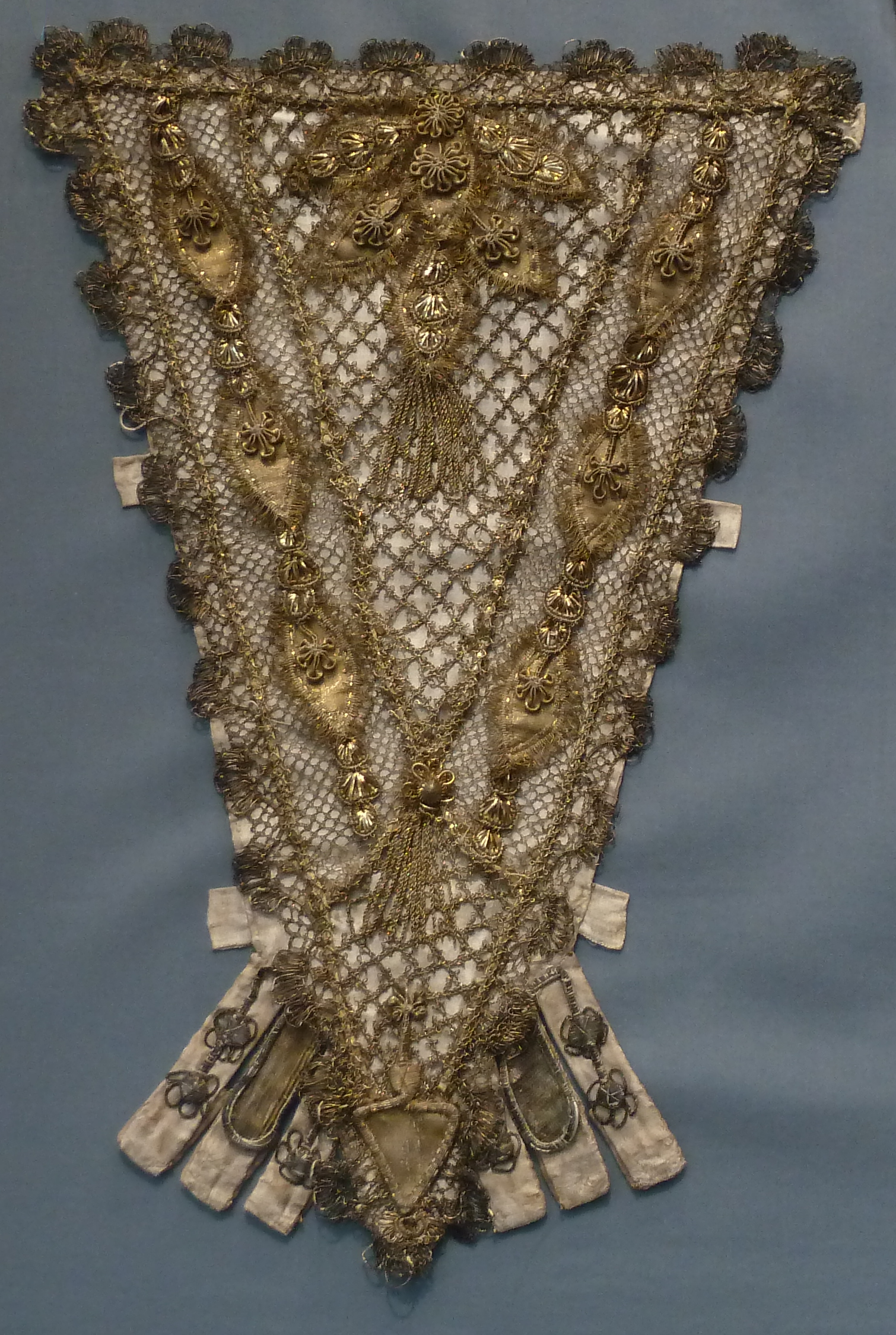
9 - 1700–1750
1. Adélaïde, Duchesse de Bourgogne wears a riding habit featuring a long coat similar to men's coats, with a matching petticoat.
2. Empress of Russia Catherine I, in full Court dress. She is wearing a voluminous white gown, with lace trimming the low, square neckline and sleeves, which are gathered at the elbow. Her red velvet mantel is lined with ermine. The portrait was painted in 1717.
3. Ulrika Eleonora, Queen Regnant of Sweden 1718–1720 wears a typical royal robe and gown.
4. Elisabeth Charlotte, Duchesse d'Orleans wears the black cap and veil of a widow with a gold-colored gown patterned with acorns and flowers. Her open sleeves are caught with jeweled clasps or pins over a shift with triple lace frills at the elbow. A royal French mantle of blue embroidered with gold fleur-de-lis and lined in ermine is draped around her shoulders, c. 1719.
5. Attendants at a wedding wear solid-colored mantuas with closed petticoats and open-fronted bodices. Elbow-length sleeves are cuffed. The ruffles of the shift are visible at neck and elbow, England, 1729.
6. Sophia Dorothea of Prussia, Margravine of Brandenburg-Schwedt wears a silk brocade dress.
7. Queen Sophie Dorothea of Prussia wears a rose-colored velvet gown with ermine trim (and possibly lining).
8. Prussian court fashion: Queen Elizabeth Christine, wife of Frederick the Great, wears a gown with a slightly squared neckline and narrow lace frills at bodice and sleeve. Note the trim on the pocket slits in the skirt of her open gown. She wears a diamond choker around her neck.
9. Stomacher, silk satin with metallic-thread lace, appliqués, passementerie and tassels. France, 1700–1750. Los Angeles County Museum of Art M.67.8.99.

==== 1740s ====
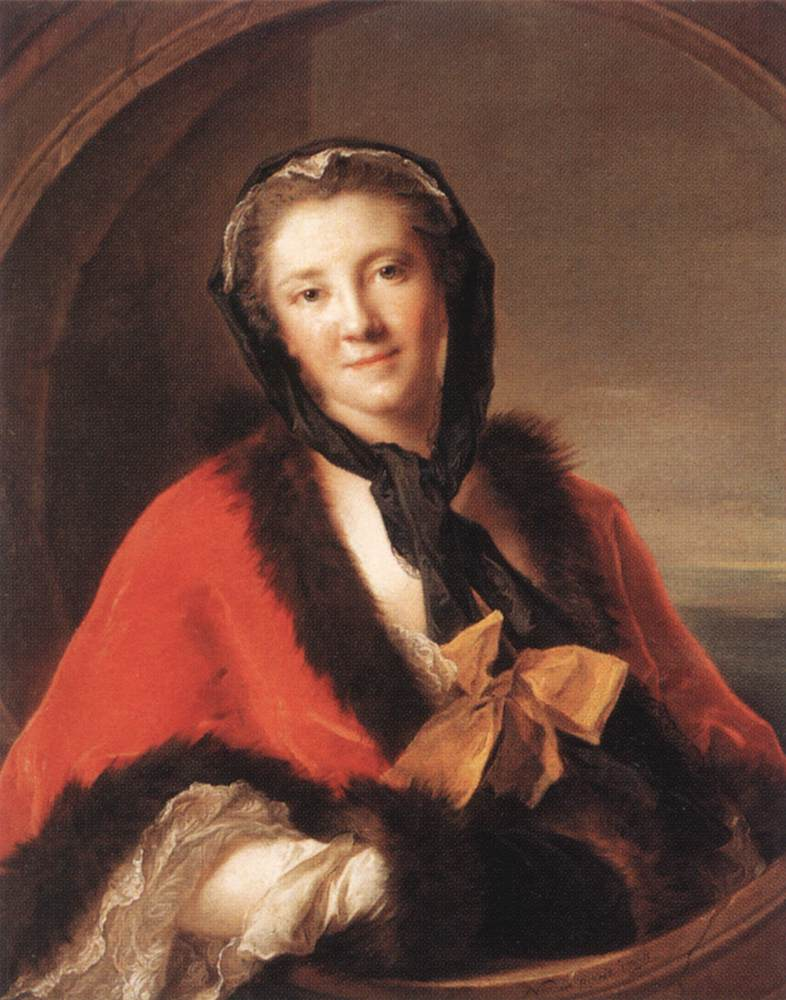
1 – 1741

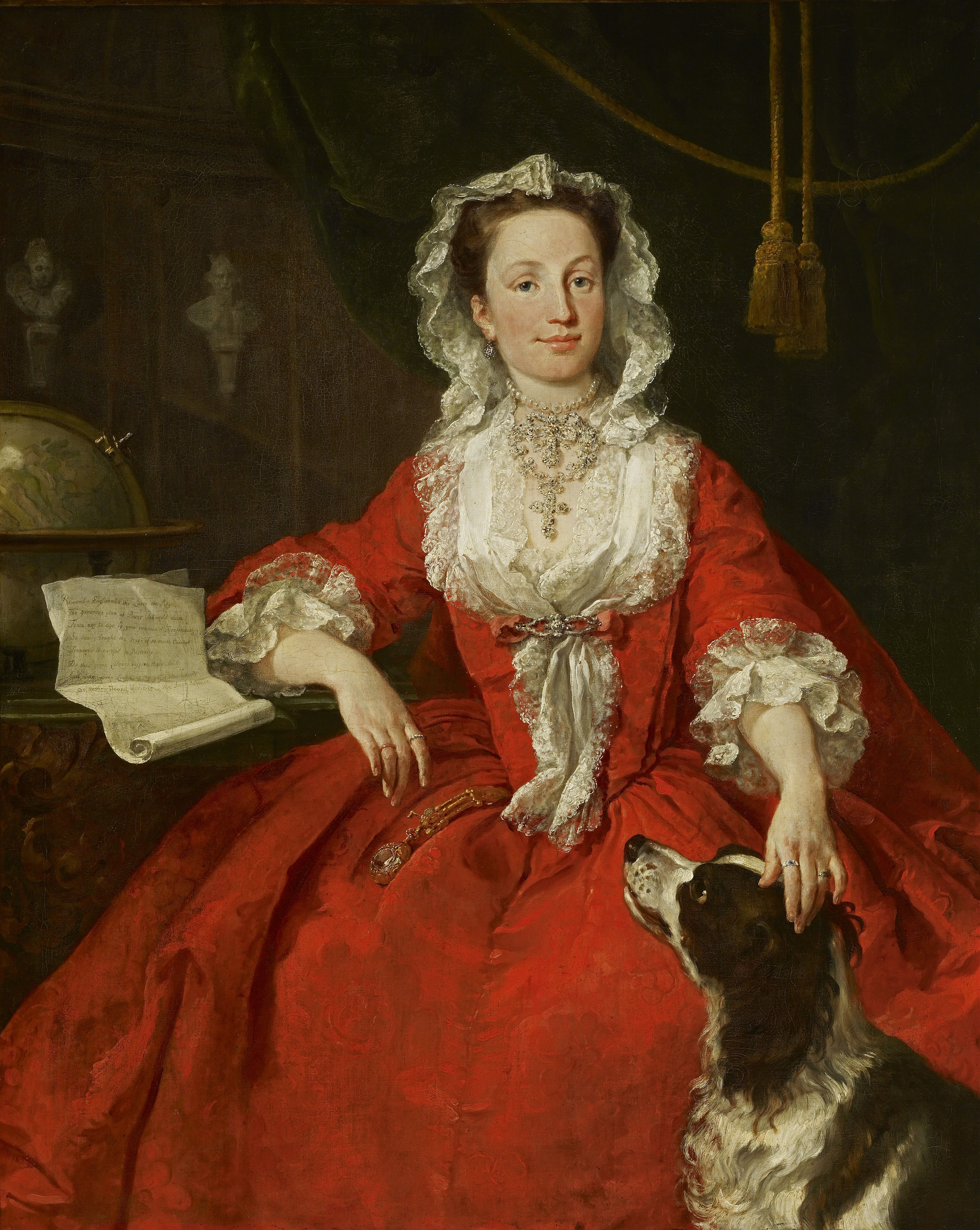
2 – 1742

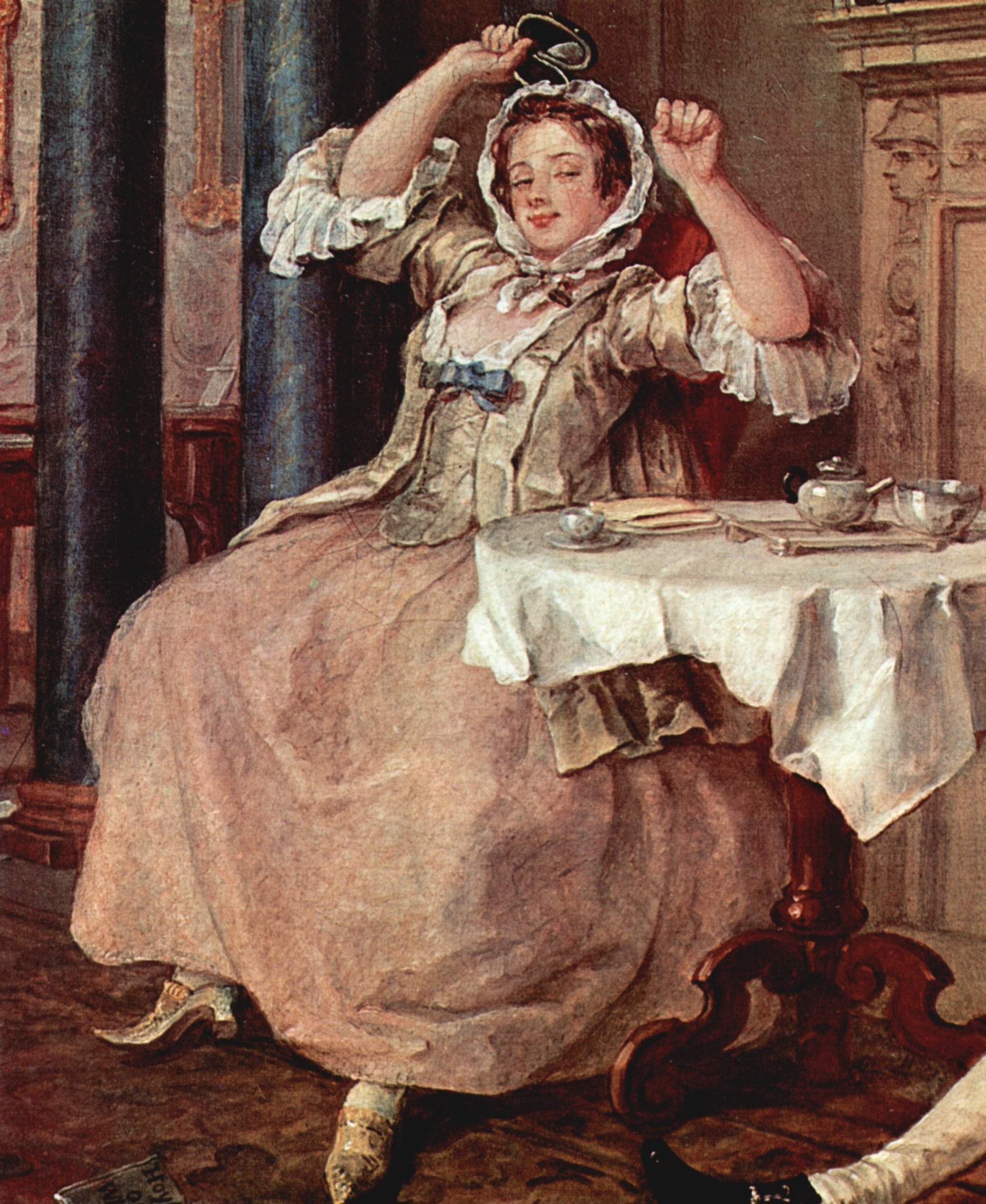
3 – 1743–45

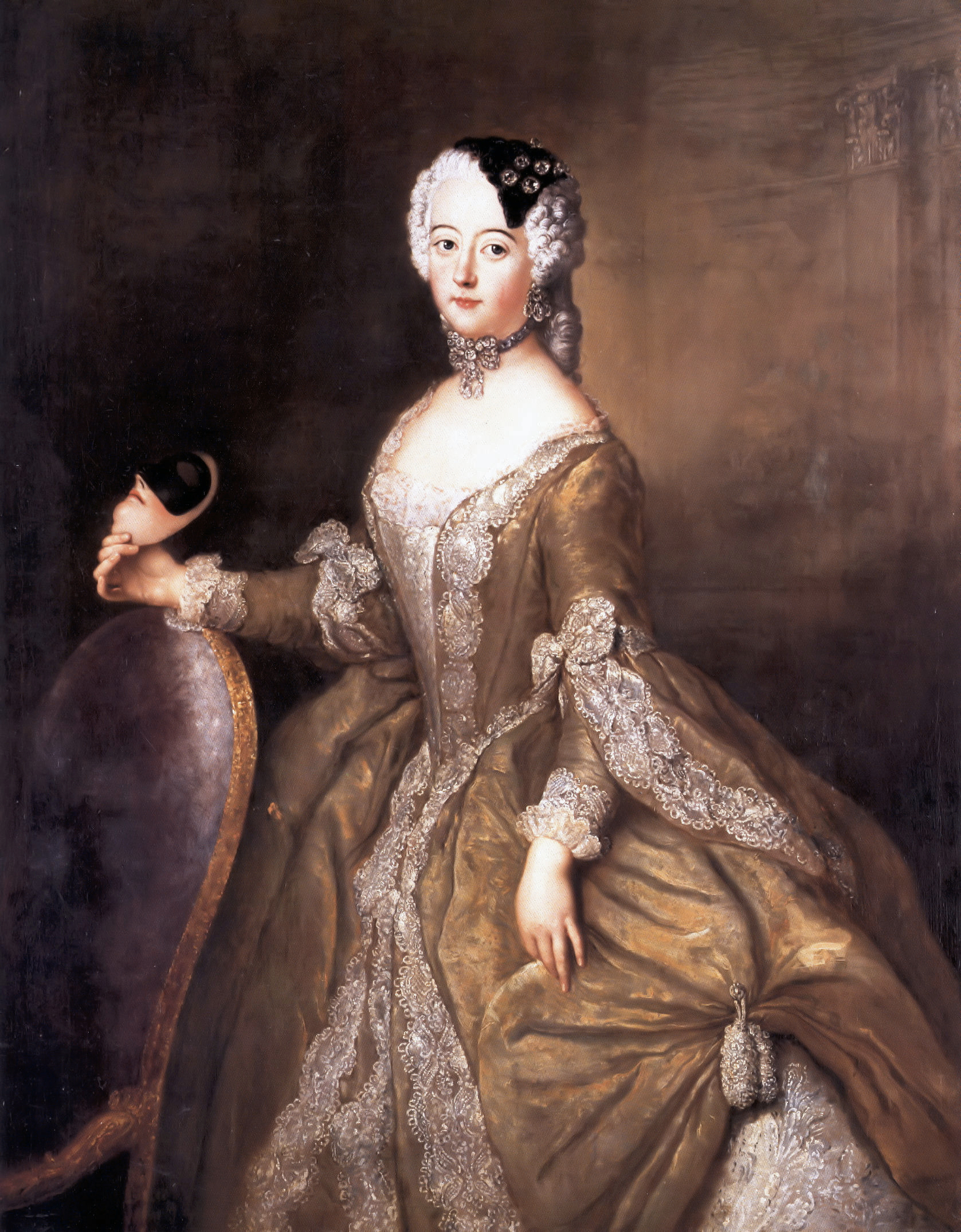
4 – 1744

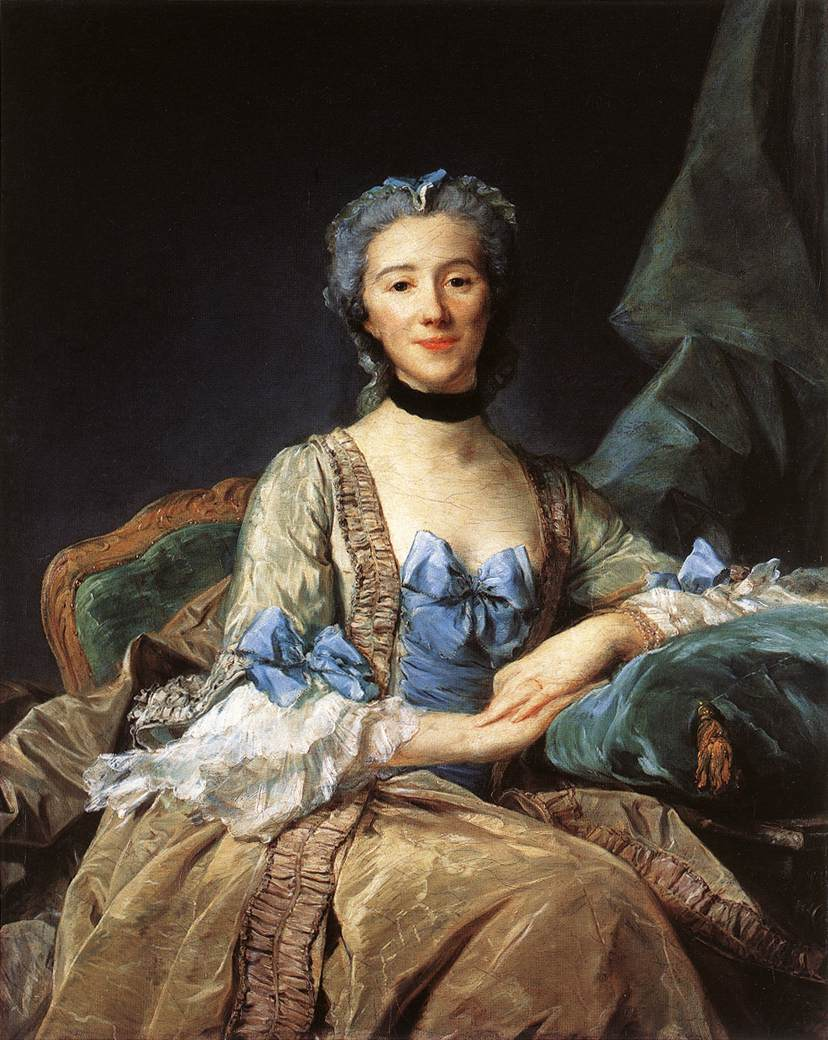
5 – 1749

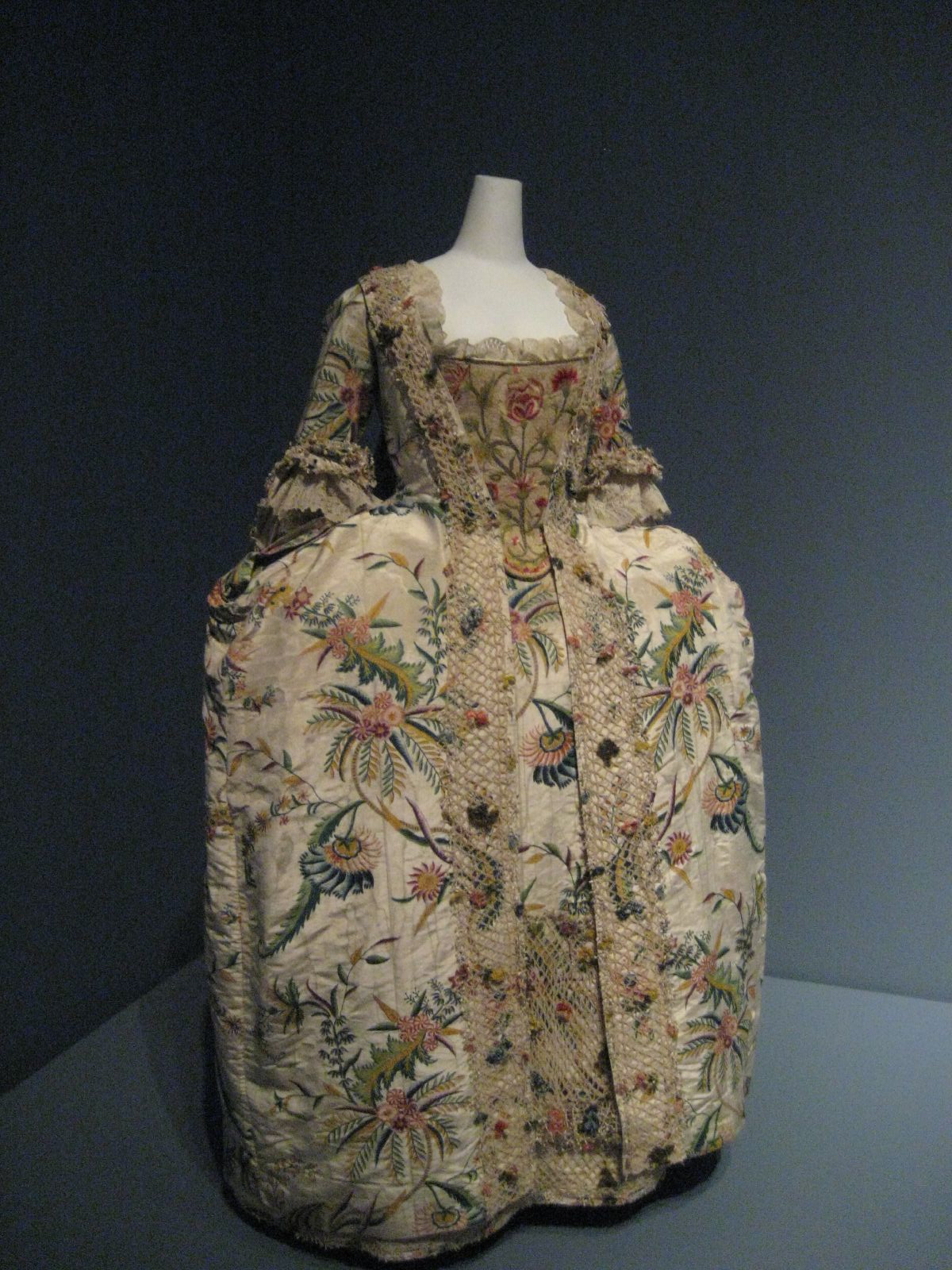
6 – 1740s

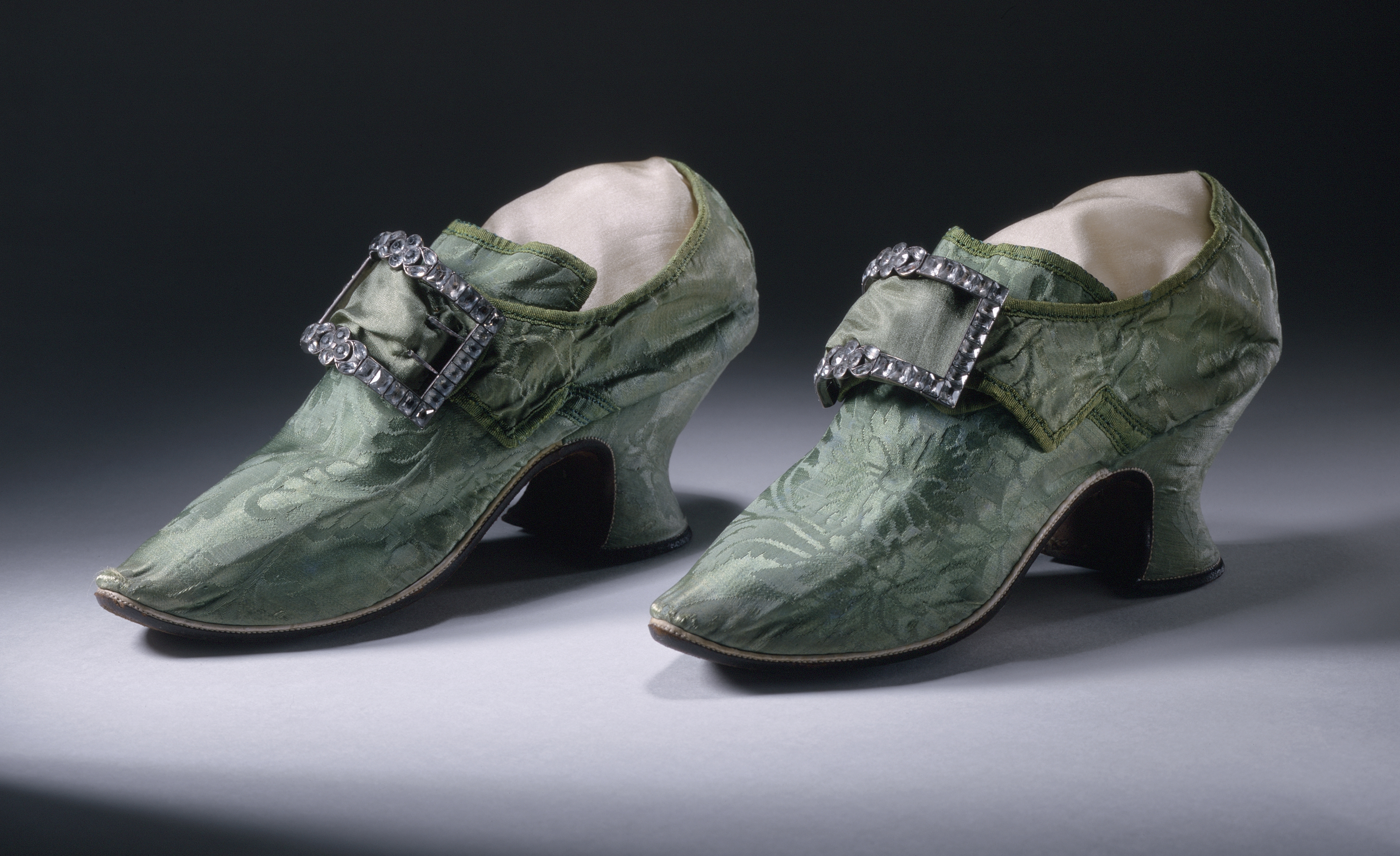
7 - 1740s
1. Ulla Tessin, 1741, wears a black hood over a lace cap, and a red, fur-lined shoulder cape called a mantle or tippet. She carries a matching fur muff. A large ribbon bow trims her bodice at the neckline.
2. Mary Edwards, 1742, wears a red gown with a lace-trimmed kerchief or fichu tucked under the ribbon bow on her bodice. Her sleeves are bell-shaped, and she wears a lace hood or cap.
3. William Hogarth's Marriage A-la-Mode series depicts a fashionable young wife wearing a sack-back jacket and stomacher with a contrasting petticoat. A linen hood or cap is tied under her chin, 1743–45.
4. Louisa Ulrika of Prussia wears a gown with "split sleeves" (elbow frills and a lower sleeve tight to the wrist). Her overskirt is looped up over her petticoat and she wears a black cap set with diamond studs. Her choker necklace is set with a diamond-studded bow, 1744.
5. Madame de Sorquainville's open gown is laced with a wide blue ribbon over a stomacher and is worn with a matching petticoat. The front edges of the gown are trimmed with robings, rows of fabric ruched or gathered on both edges. Sleeves are narrower, and are worn with elaborate lace engageantes. She wears a small cap and a black ribbon or frill around her neck.
6. A Sack-back gown in the Metropolitan Museum of Art, New York features a matching petticoat and is shown with an elaborate stomacher. English, fabric from Holland or Germany, 1740s.
7. English silk shoes with shoe buckles, 1740s

== Men's fashion ==
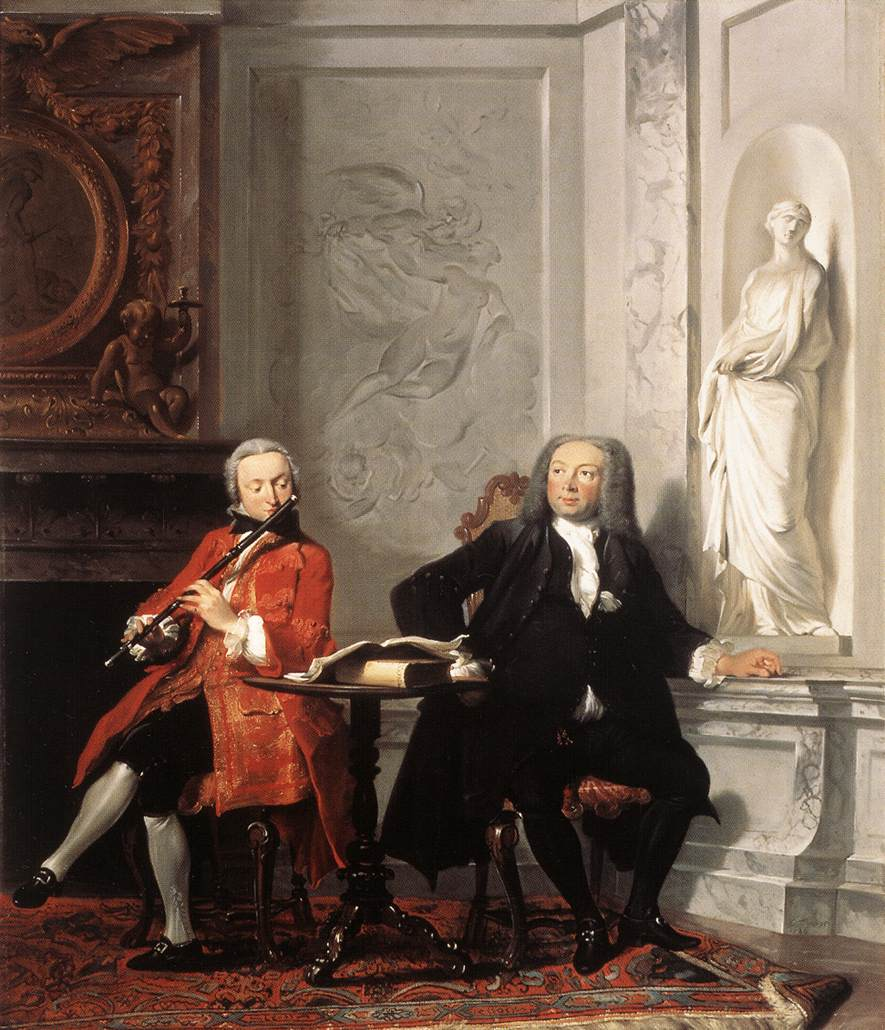
Jeronimus Tonneman and his son wear collarless coats with deep cuffs and matching waistcoats, worn with breeches, ruffled shirts, silk stockings, and buckled shoes. The young man wears a bag wig and solitaire, 1736.

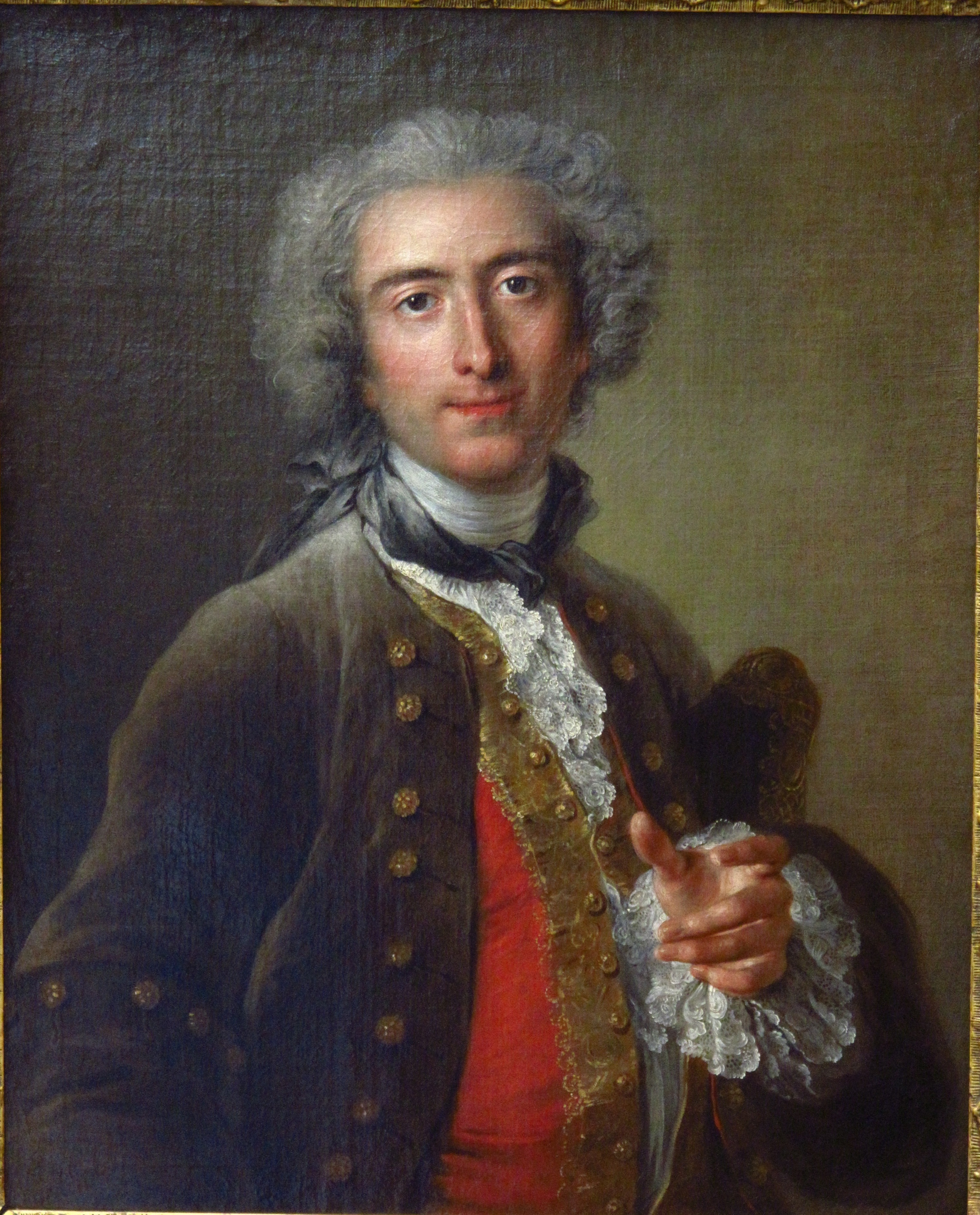
Philippe Coypel wears a red waistcoat trimmed with gold lace under a plain brown coat. His shirt has lace ruffles. He wears a bag wig with solitaire, 1732.

=== Suits ===
The male suit, also known as the habit à la française, made of three parts: the justaucorps, a jacket, and breeches. The waistcoat was the most decorative piece, usually lavishly embroidered or displaying patterned fabrics. In the early 18th century the Breeches usually stopped at the knee, with white stockings worn underneath and heeled shoes, which usually had large square buckles. Coats were worn closer to the body and were not as skirt-like as during the Baroque era. They were also worn more open to showcase the elaborate waistcoats... The skirts of the coat remained wide and were stiffened by buckram, horsehair, and other means to fan out over the hips. The front edges of the coat, which previously had been cut straight, began to curve slightly towards the back to reveal more of the waistcoat Fabrics for men were primarily silks, velvets, and brocades, with woolens used for the middle class and for sporting costumes.

==== Coat ====
When the coat began to be worn in the 1600s, it was cut with little shaping to the figure and hung loosely from the shoulders to just below the knee. There were long vents from waist to hem at the sides and center-back, generally edged with buttons and buttonholes. During the 1670s and 1680s, the coat became closer-fitting with a slight shaping at the waist to produce a longer, narrower, more severe line. Sleeves were worn longer and tighter but still with cuffs. The slim, straight line was emphasized by low-set vertical pockets, but in the late 1680s, these were largely replaced by horizontal pockets which were later given flaps.

==== Breeches ====
Knee-breeches had a center-front opening, fastened at the waist, and were worn without other support. The legs were gathered into a band above or below the knee, closing with ties, buttons or a buckle or strap. Stockings were drawn up over the knees and covered the lower edge of the breeches.

=== Footwear ===
In the early 18th century, men's shoes continued to have a squared toe, but the heels were not as high. From 1720 to 1730, the heels became even smaller, and the shoes became more comfortable, no longer containing a block toe. The shoes from the first half of the century often contained an oblong buckle usually embedded with stones.

=== Accessories ===
Upper-class men often wore a cane as part of their outfits, suspending it by a loop from one of their waistcoat buttons to allow their hands to properly hold snuff-boxes or handkerchiefs. The cane was thus less functional and rather for the sake of fashion.

=== Hairstyles and headgear ===
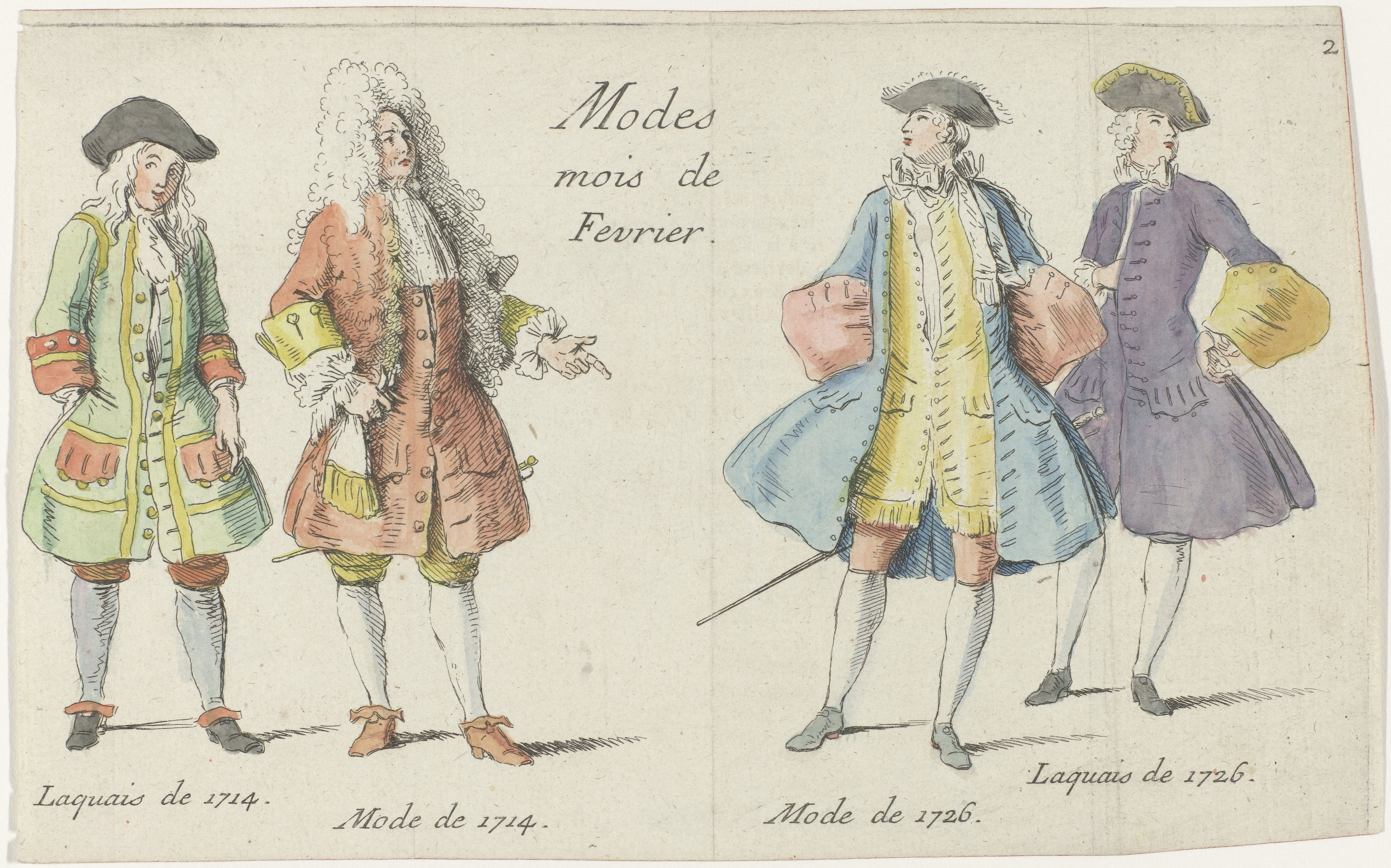
Comparison between male fashion in 1714 and 1726.

Wigs in a variety of styles were worn for different occasions and by different age groups.

The large high parted wig of the 1690s remained popular from 1700 until around 1720. During this time various colors were worn, but white was becoming more popular and the curls were getting tighter. The cadogan style of men's hair developed and became popular during this period, with horizontal rolls of hair over the ears. Later, wigs or the natural hair were worn long, brushed back from the forehead and clubbed or tied back at the nape of the neck with a black ribbon. From about 1720, a bag wig gathered the back hair in a black silk bag. Black ribbons attached to the bag were brought to the front and tied in a bow in a style called a "solitaire".

Wide-brimmed hats with brims turned up on three sides into tricornes were worn throughout the era. They were an essential element to the "domino", a stylish costume for masquerade balls, which became an increasingly popular mode of entertainment. The "domino" style consisted of a mask, a long cape, and a tricorne hat, all usually constructed of dark colors.

=== Style gallery ===
==== 1700s–1720s ====
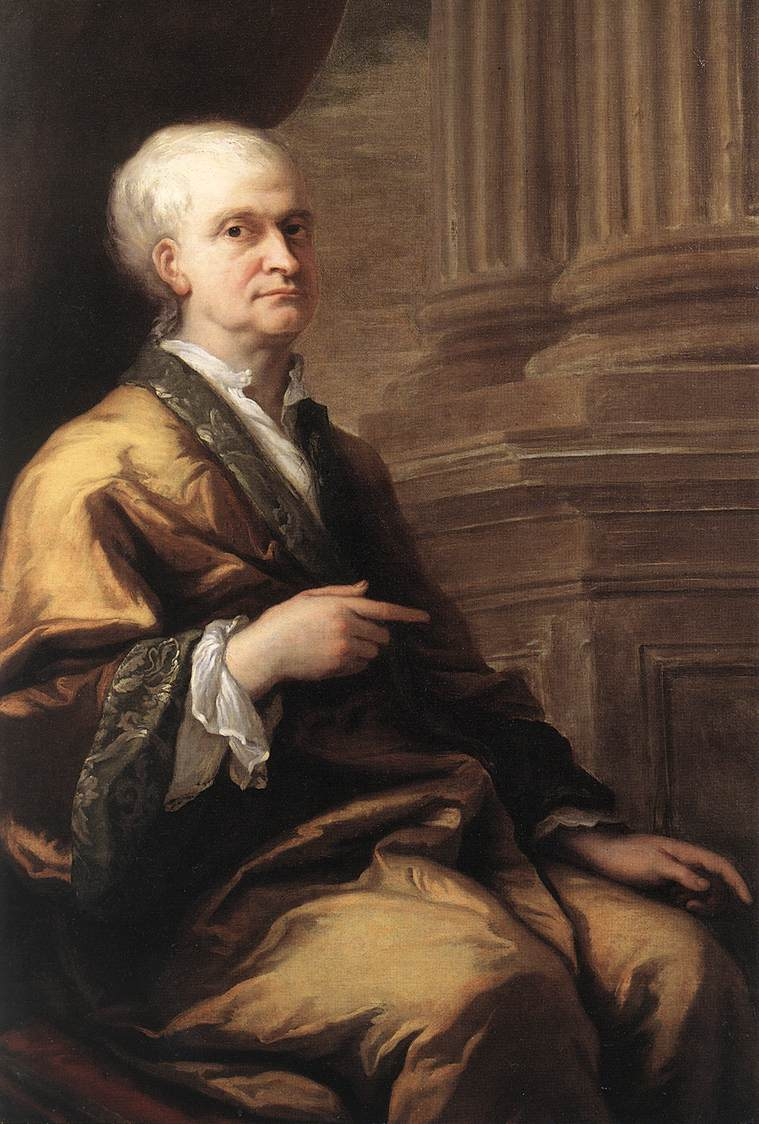
1 – c. 1710

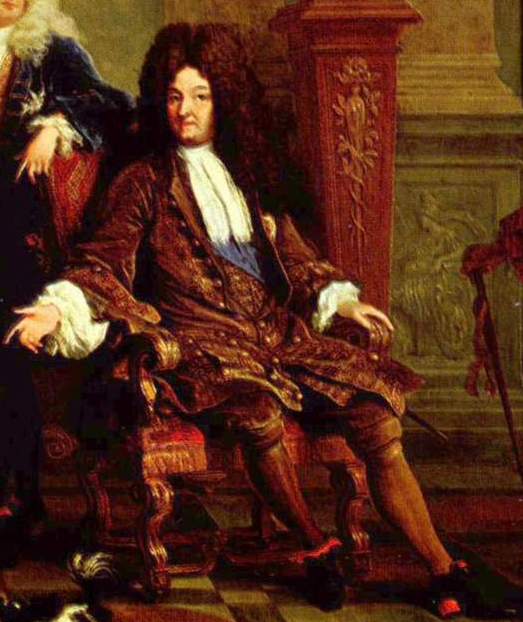
2 – 1711

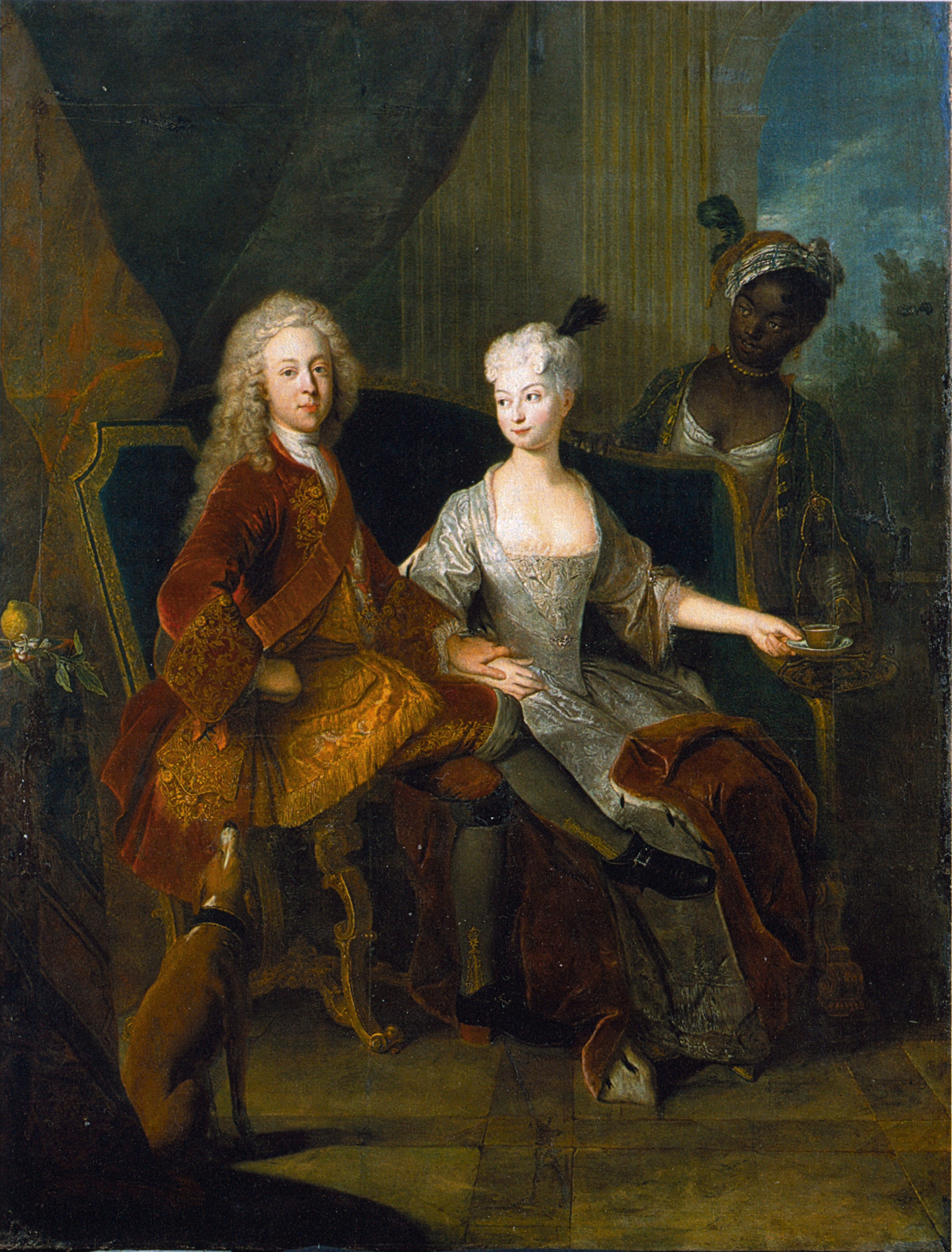
3 – 1716

4 – 1721
1. Sir Isaac Newton in old age, 1709–1712. He wears a banyan with a patterned lining. Note the T-shaped cut, without a shoulder seam.
2. Louis XIV wears a large periwig, justacorps, and stockings over his breeches.
3. A German prince shows his stiff turned-back cuffs, embroidered in gold, as is the centre of his coat, stockings over his breeches.
4. Back view of a coat of 1721 shows the center back vent and the pleated gores set into the side seams. The gentleman wears square-toed shoes and carries a tricorne tucked under his arm.

==== 1730s–1740s ====
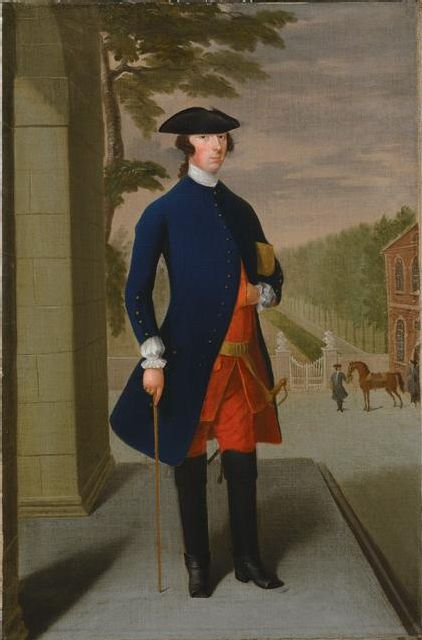
1 – 1730s

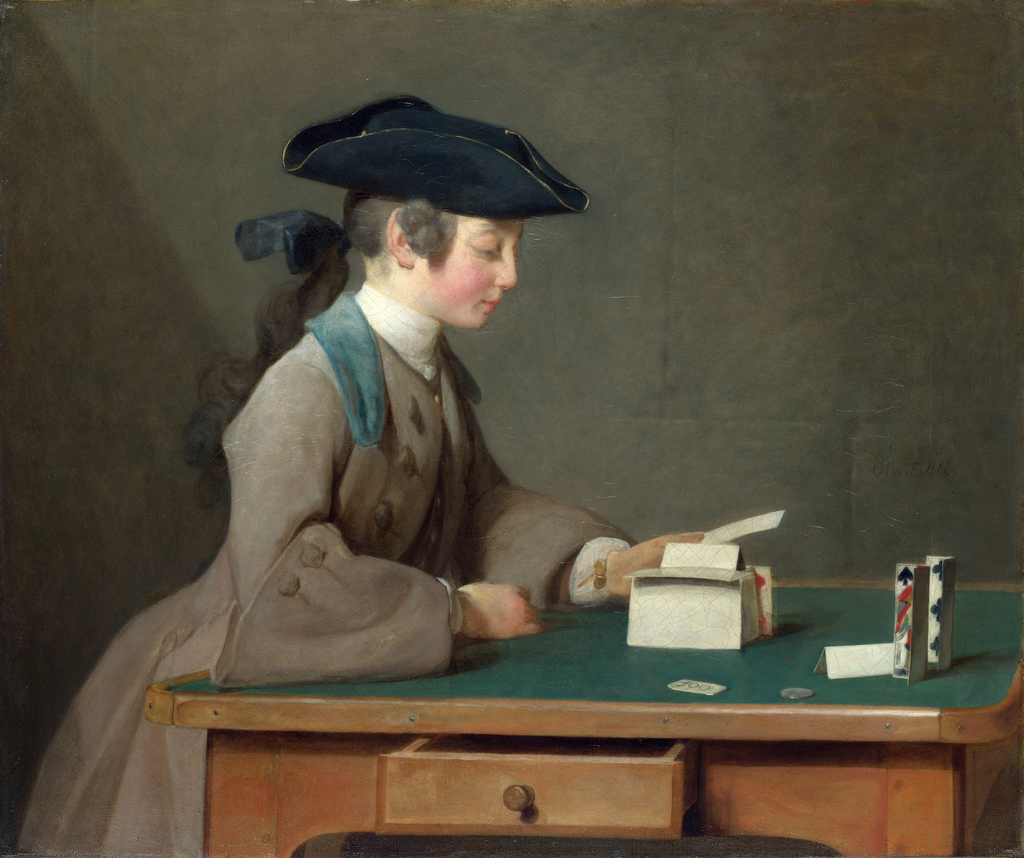
2 – 1736

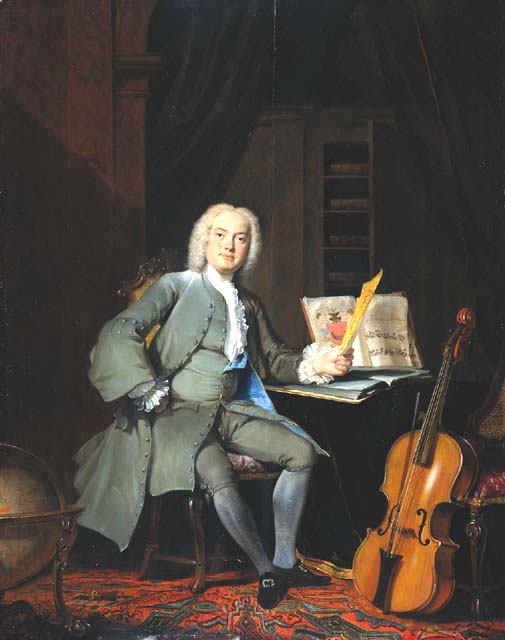
3 – 1736

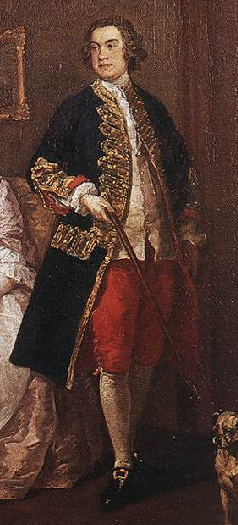
4 – 1738

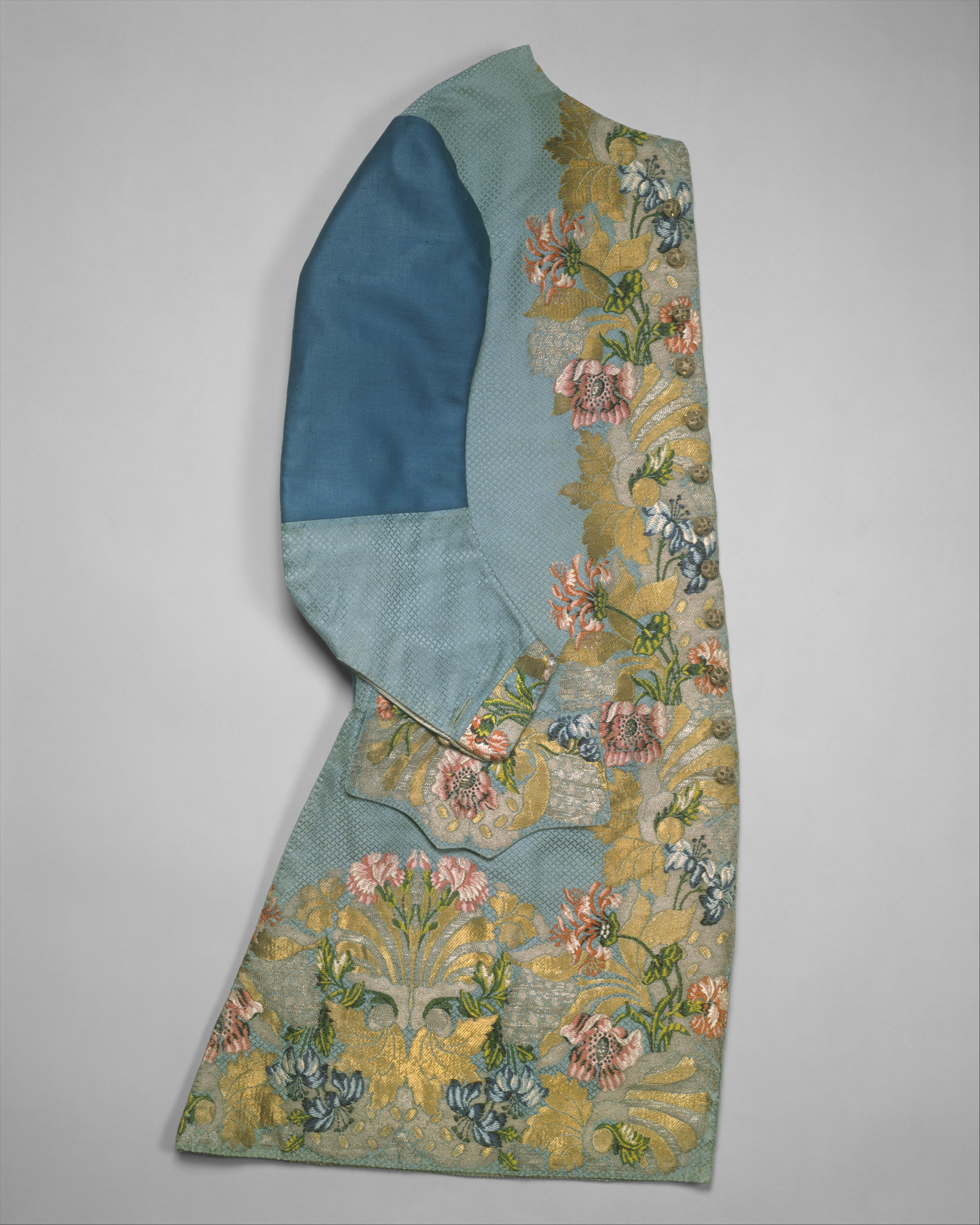
5 - 1747

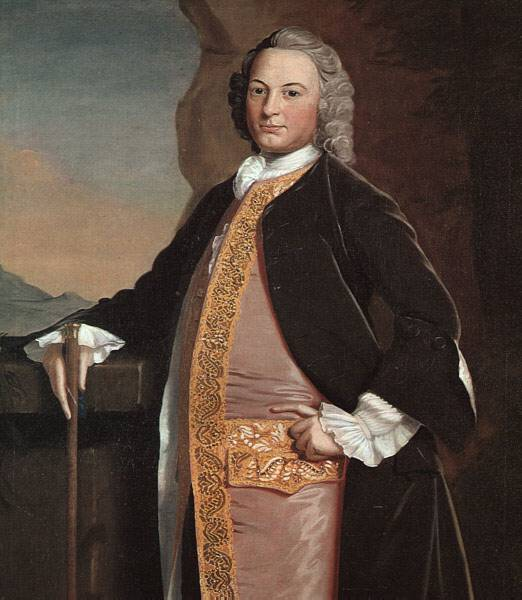
6 – 1748

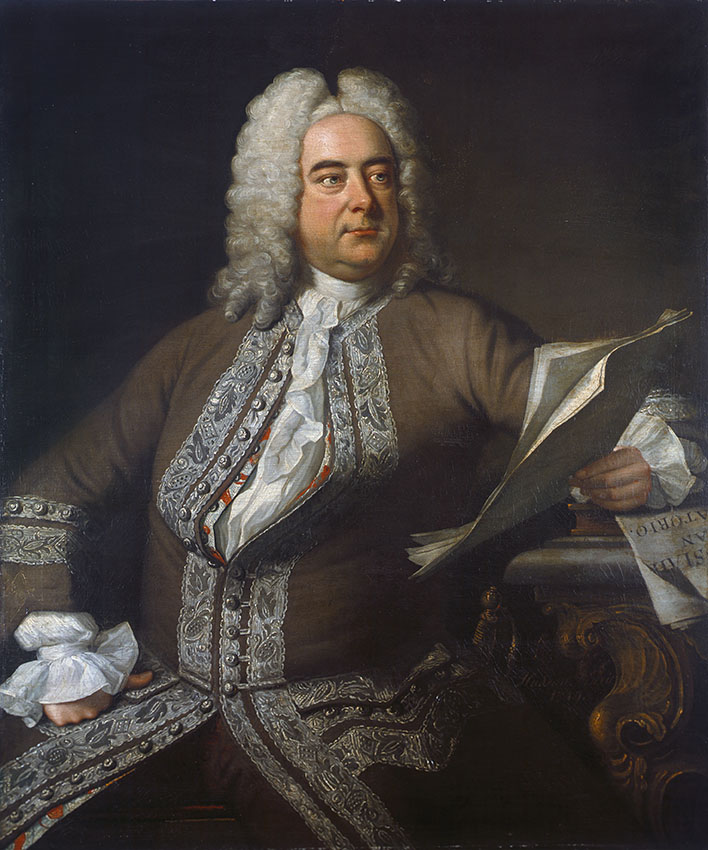
7 – 1749

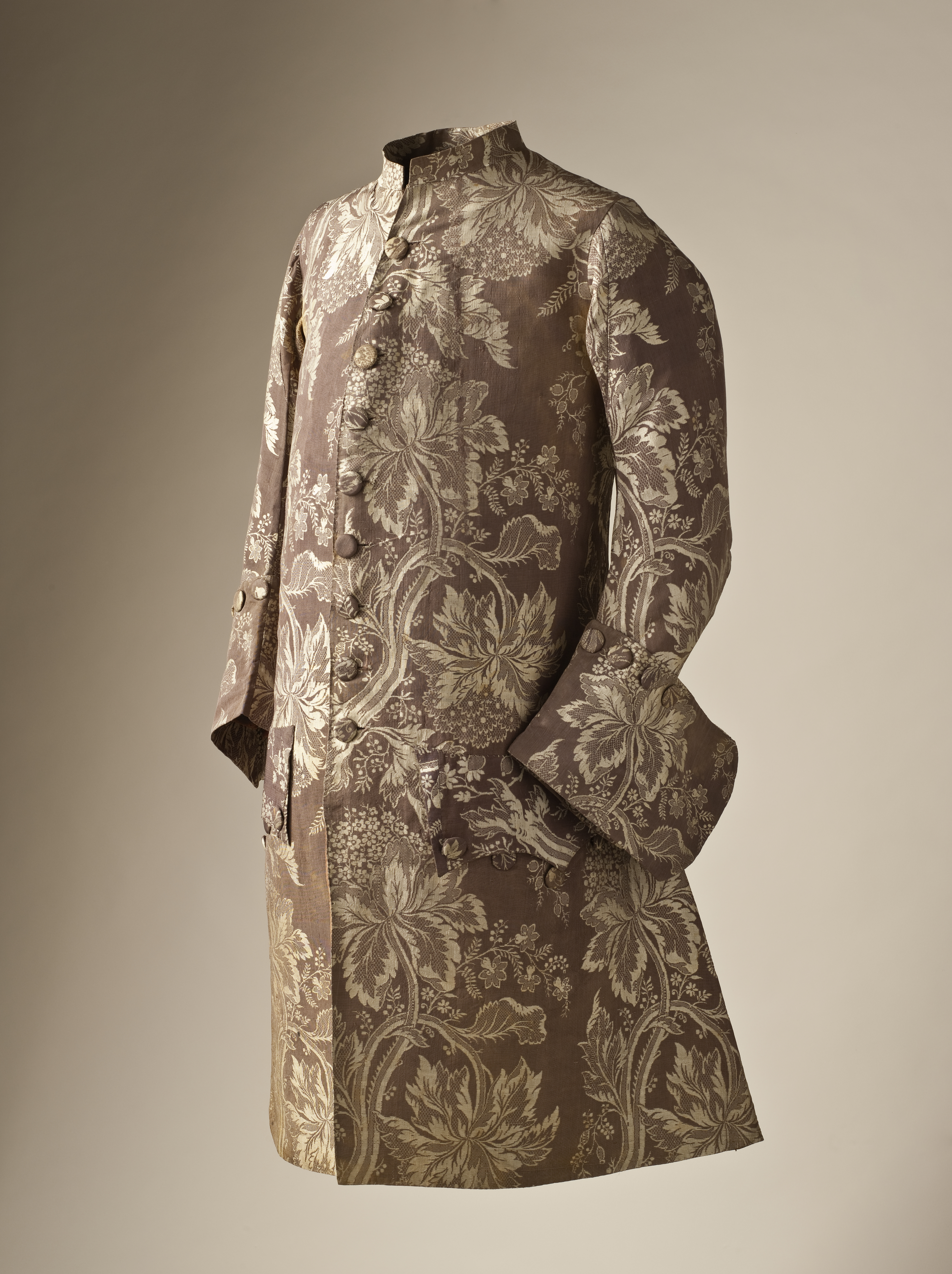
8 - 1745–50
1. Joseph Leeson of Ireland, later 1st Earl of Milltown, wears a narrow-sleeved blue coat lined in red with a red waistcoat and breeches. He wears a tricorne and tall black riding boots, 1730s.
2. Man playing cards wears a tricorne. His long brown wig (or possibly hair) is tied back with a black ribbon. His plain coat has deep cuffs.
3. Dutch gentleman of 1736 wears a collarless grey coat with deep cuffs and a long waistcoat, both lined in sky blue, with matching breeches. His black shoes have square buckles.
4. English gentleman of 1738 wears a wide-hipped formal coat with applied lace over a plainer contrasting hip-length waistcoat and red breeches. His coat is lined in red. Shoes with elaborate buckles and white stockings complete the ensemble.
5. Waistcoat (Garthwaite/Lekeux) (1747) of silk brocade woven to shape, design by Anna Maria Garthwaite, collection of the Costume Institute, Metropolitan Museum of Art.
6. American William Bowdoin, 1748, wears a gold-embroidered waistcoat under a dark coat lined in white.
7. Portrait of Georg Friedrich Händel wearing a mulberry-colored coat trimmed with bands of embroidery and fastened with buttons and loops over a patterned waistcoat (barely visible under the coat) and a white shirt with ruffles, 1749.
8. Man's silk coat with wide cuffs, 1745–1750, in a lace-like floral pattern of white on brown, France. Los Angeles County Museum of Art, M.2007.211.795.

== Children's fashion ==
Toddler boys and girls wore low-necked gowns. Leading strings—narrow straps of fabric attached to the gown at the shoulder—functioned as a sort of leash to keep the child from straying too far or falling as they learned to walk.

Children older than toddlers continued to wear clothing which was in many respects simply a smaller version of adult clothing. Although it is often said that children wore miniature versions of adult clothing, this is something of a myth. Girls wore back-fastening gowns, trimmed much more simply than women's. The skirt of a girl's gown was not split down the front, as women's typically were. Girls did not wear jackets or bedgowns. Boys wore shirts, breeches, waistcoats and coats a man would, but often wore their necks open, and the coat was fitted and trimmed differently from a man's, and boys often went bareheaded. During some decades of the 18th Century, boys' shirts and coats had different collars and cuffs than a man's. Even if the size is not apparent, it is usually possible to tell a child's garment from an adult's.

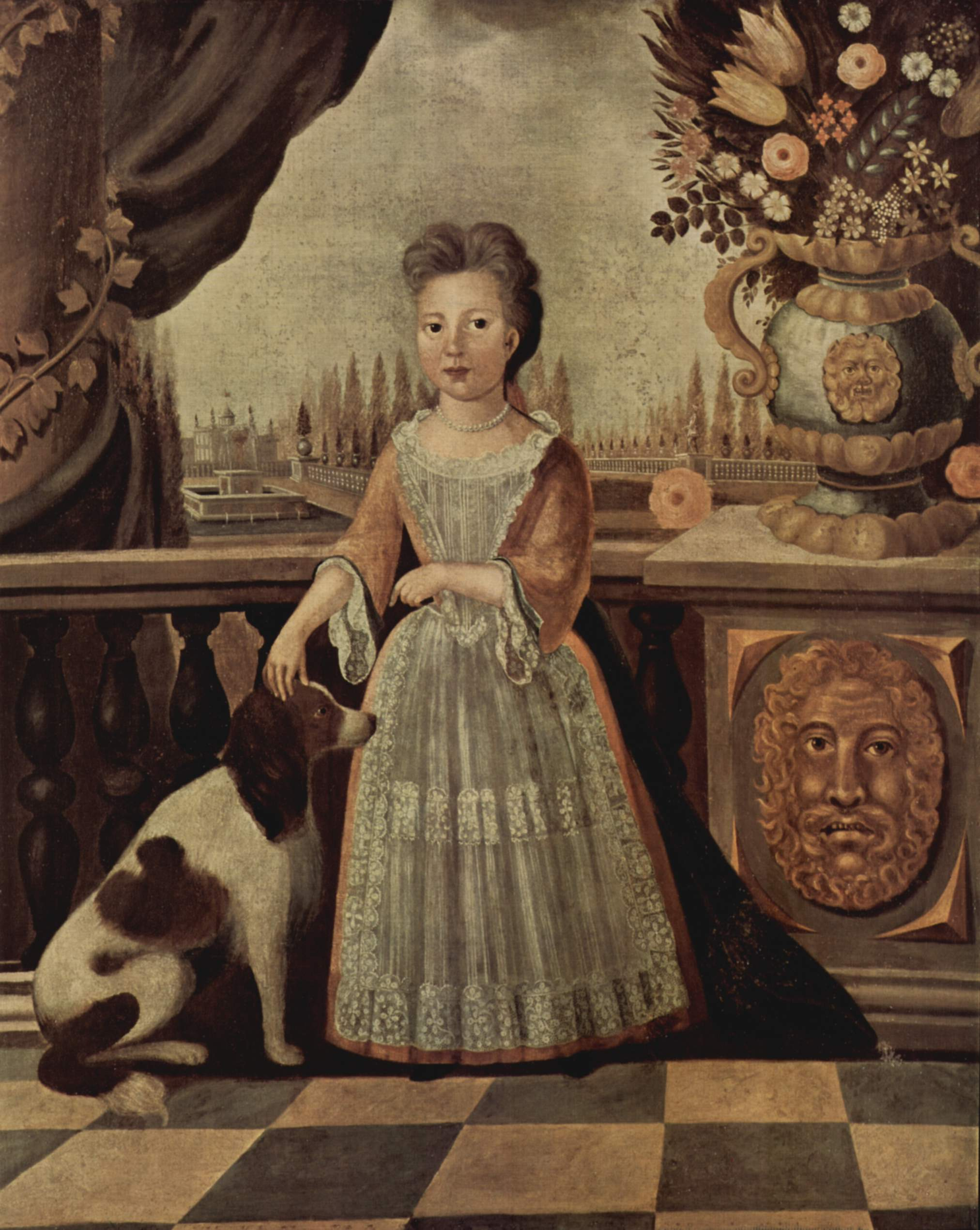
1 – 1710

2 – 1718

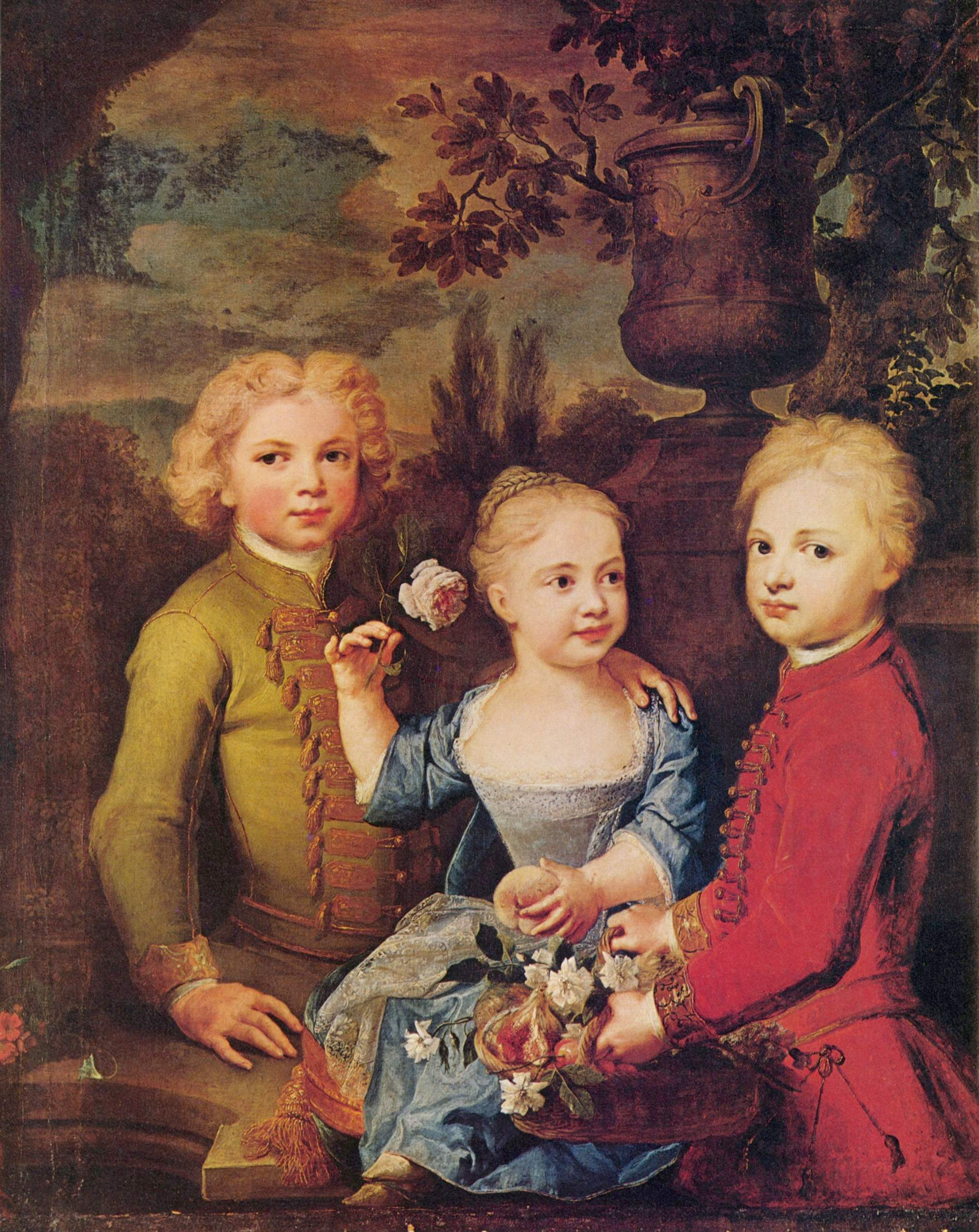
3 – 1724

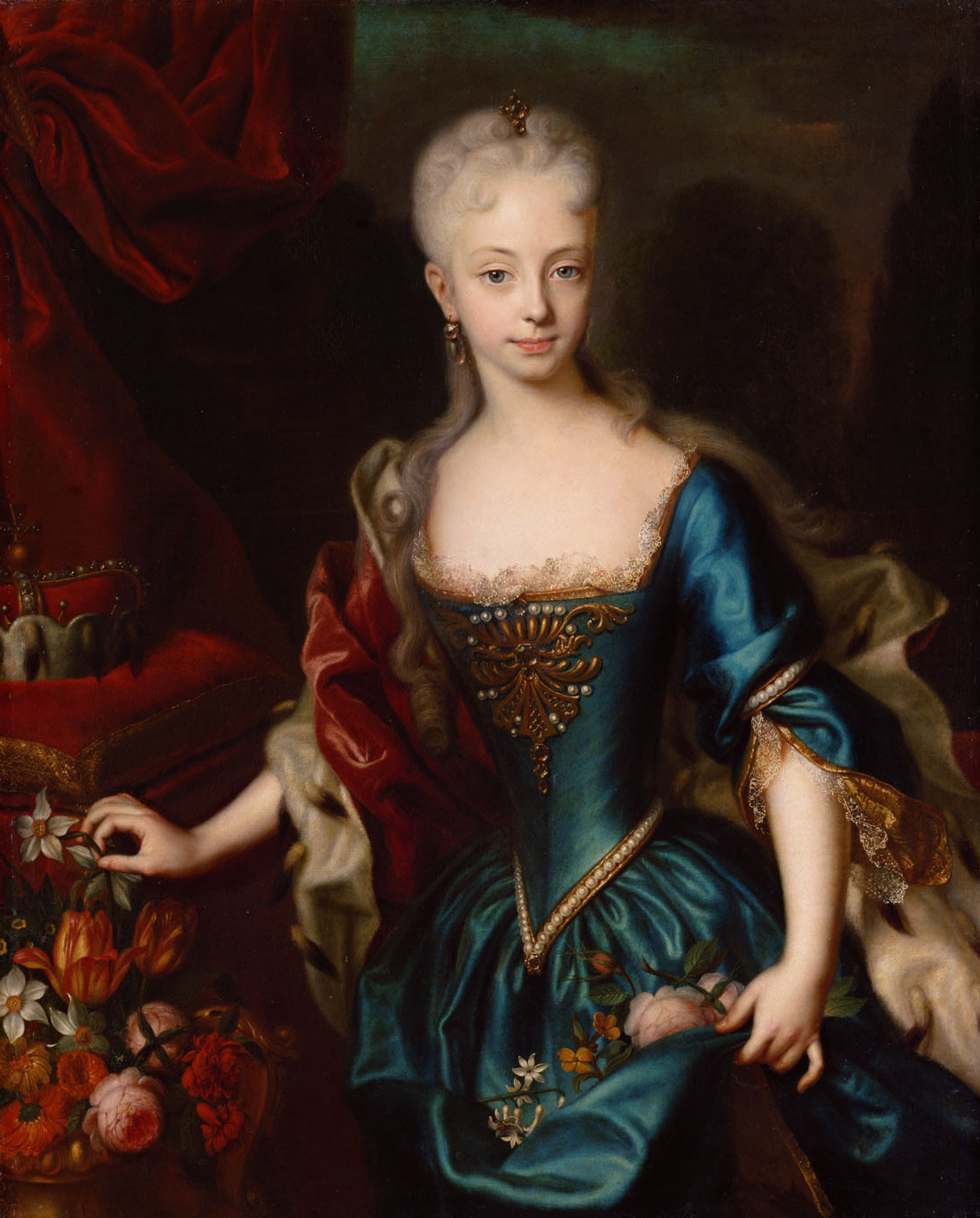
4 – 1727

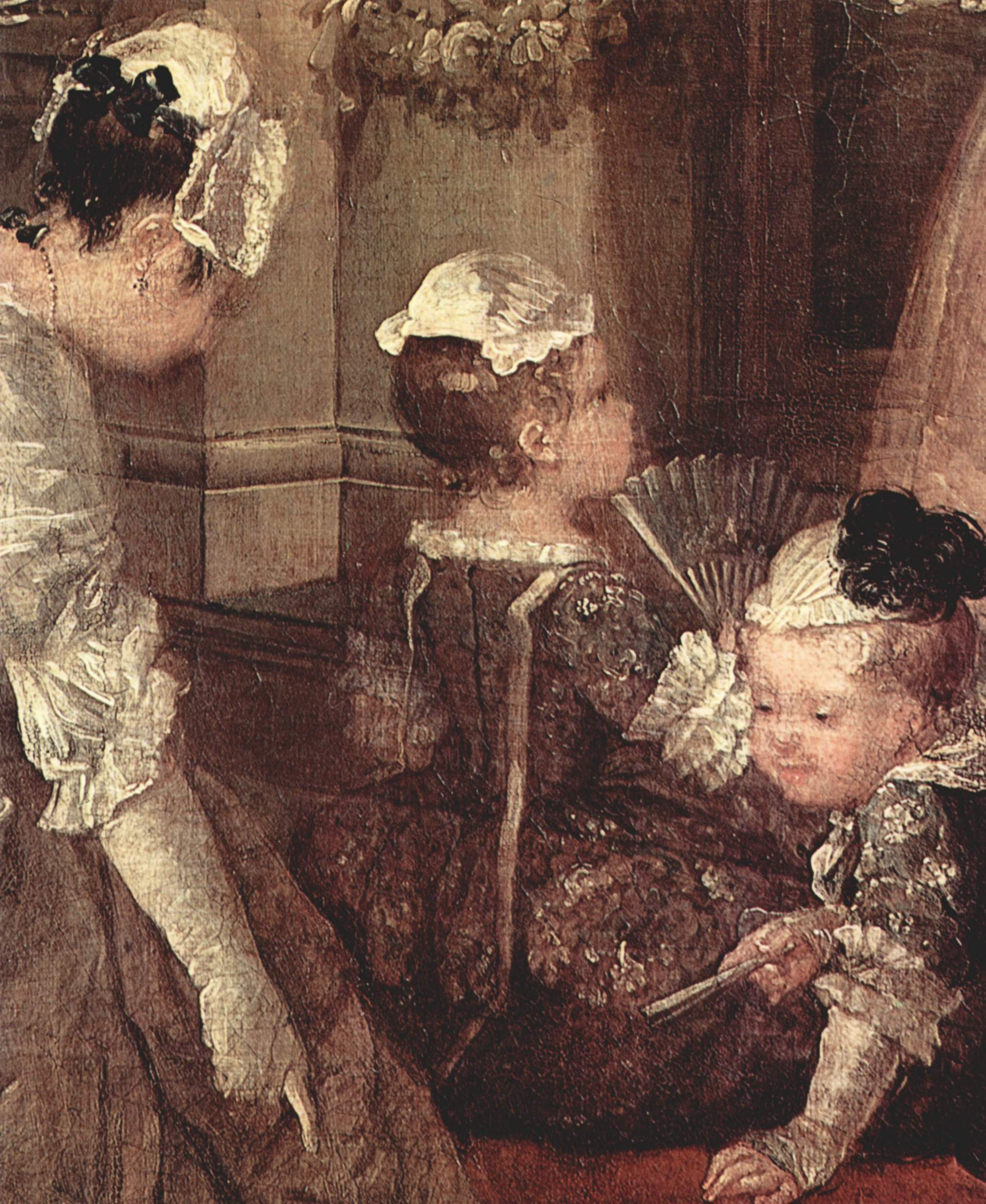
5 – 1731–32

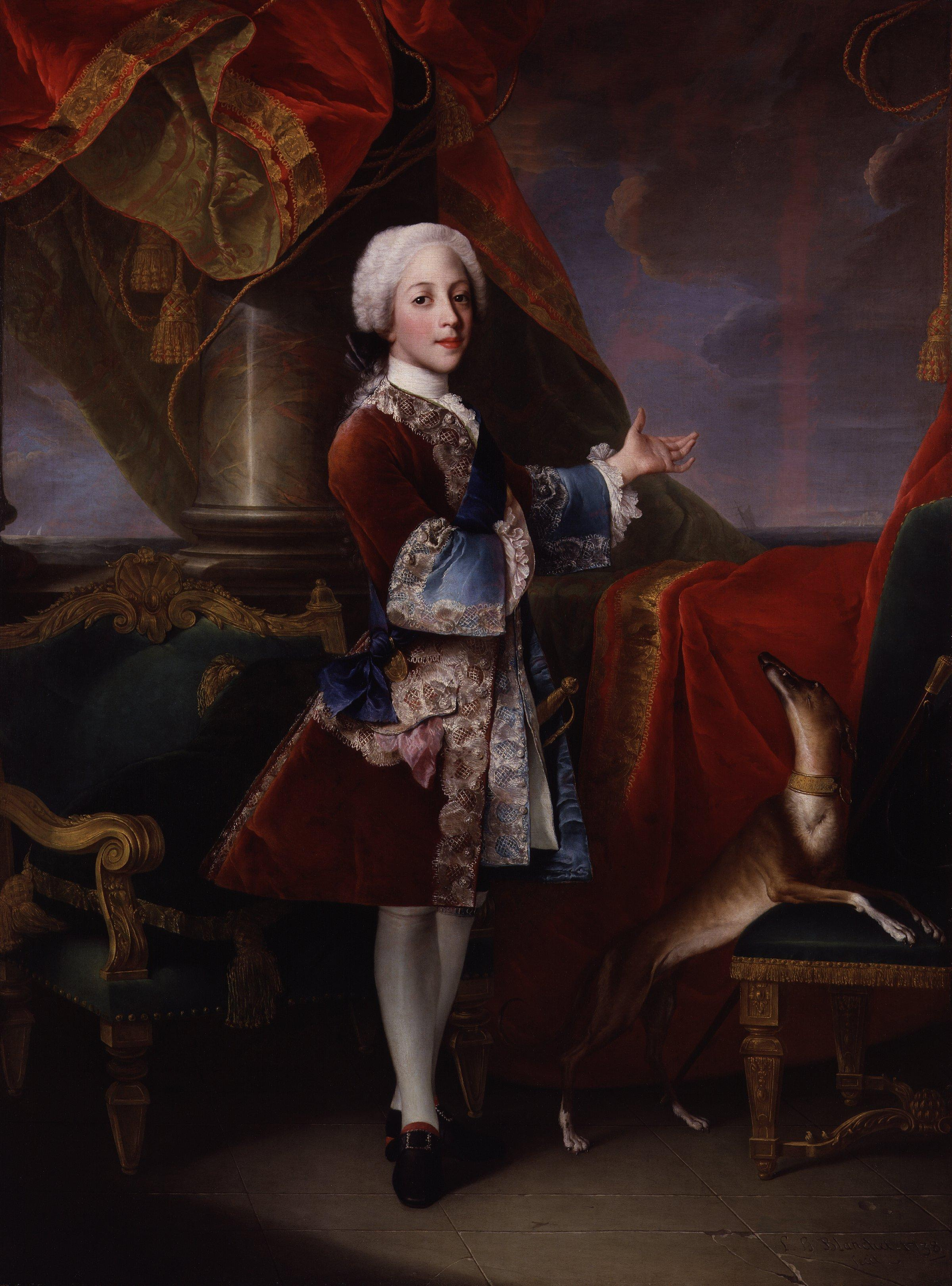
6 – 1738

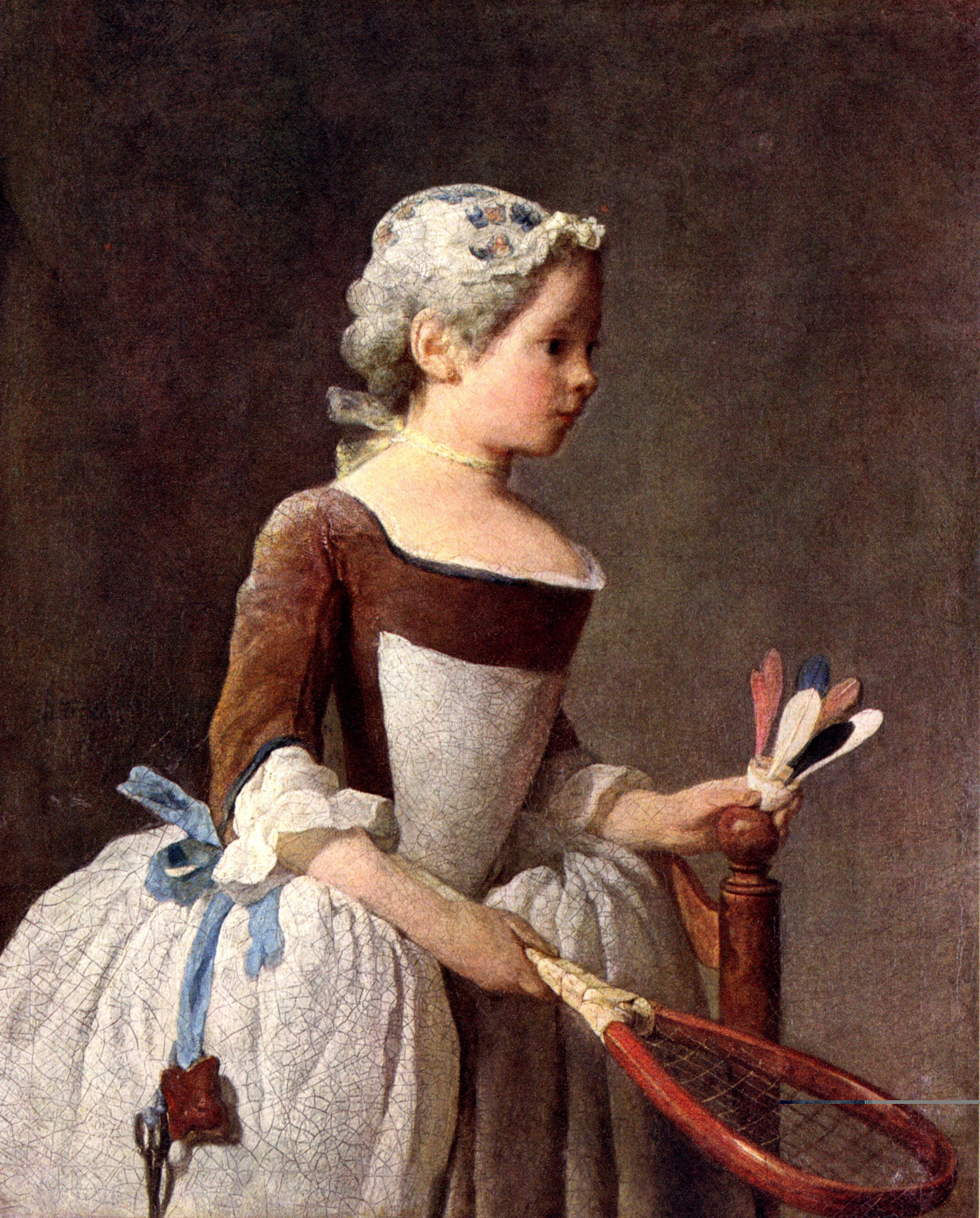
7 – 1740

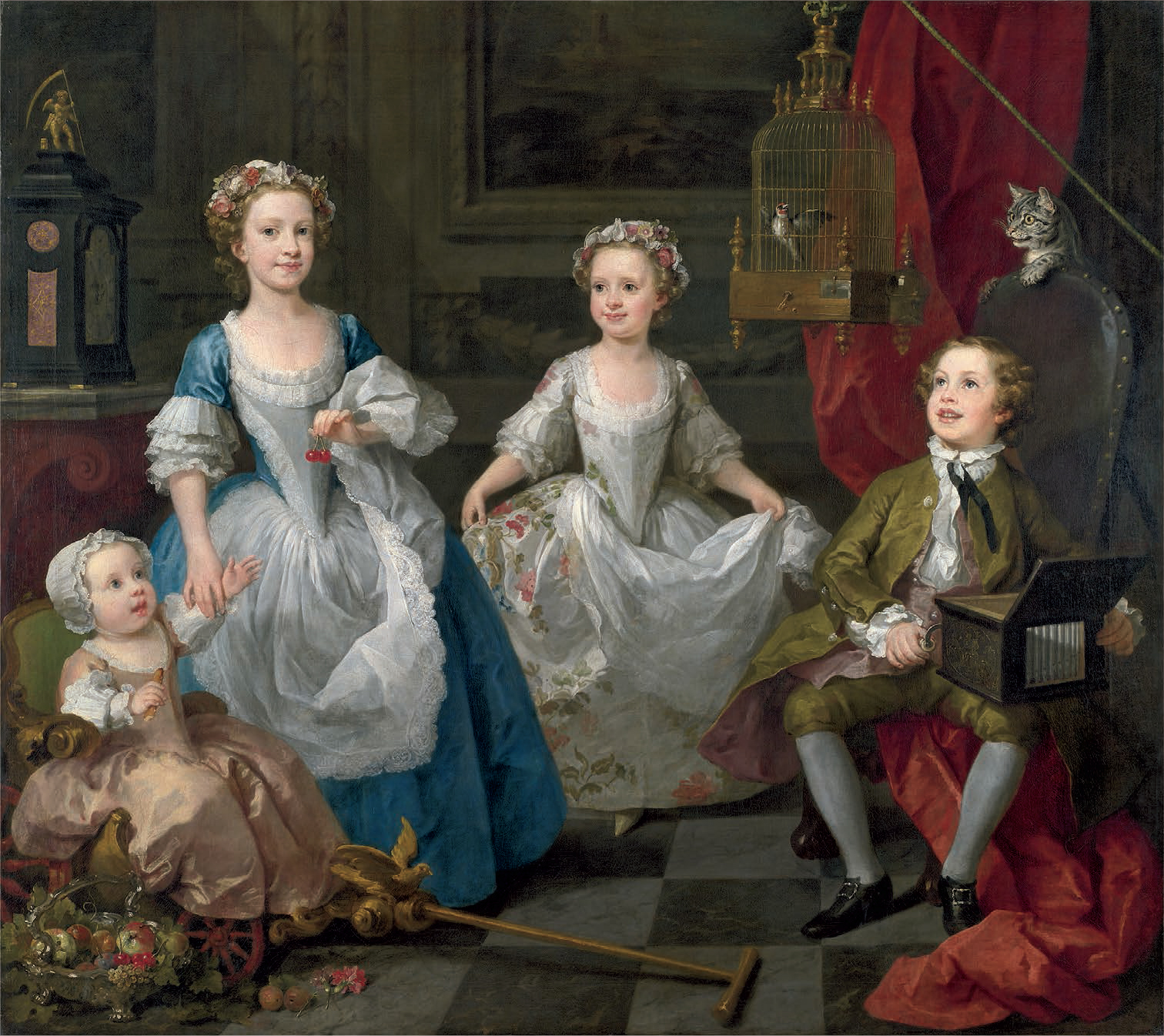
8 – 1745

1. A simple trimmed lace and cloth dress English/French cut. (1710)

2. Silk dress supported by panniers. Note that there is no central parting to the dress. The low cut neckline is also less ornamented than a contemporary women's would be. (1718)

3. A group scene of a girl and two boys. Boys were breeched at around 5–10. The girl wears a low neckline that was customary for young girls and boys. (1724)

4. Portrait of the young archduchess and future Empress Maria Theresa. The neckline is still lower than a woman's but is more ornamented than that of a child. (1727)

5. The girl sitting holding a fan is displaying her leading strings that her mother would have used to make sure she didn't fall when learning to walk. (1730)

6. A boy of around 10 who has been breeched and wears a Frock coat of a child's pattern. The cuffs and frills would have been less obvious on a grown man. (1738)

7. A middle-class girl c. 1740. The simpler fabric and colours used in her dress show her not to be of noble birth but not in poverty either. Again the low neckline is typical of girls of that age. (1740)

8. A group portrait of children in fine clothes of the period. The boy has been newly breeched while the girls have the characteristic low neckline of children. (1745)

== Satirising fashion ==
Joseph Addison in 1711 devoted an issue of The Spectator to satirising fashion, by noting how the country fashions lagged behind those in London. "As I proceeded in my journey I observed the petticoat grew scantier and scantier, and about threescore miles from London was so very unfashionable, that a woman might walk in it without any manner of inconvenience" and so on.
