= Engageante =

False sleeves worn with women's clothing

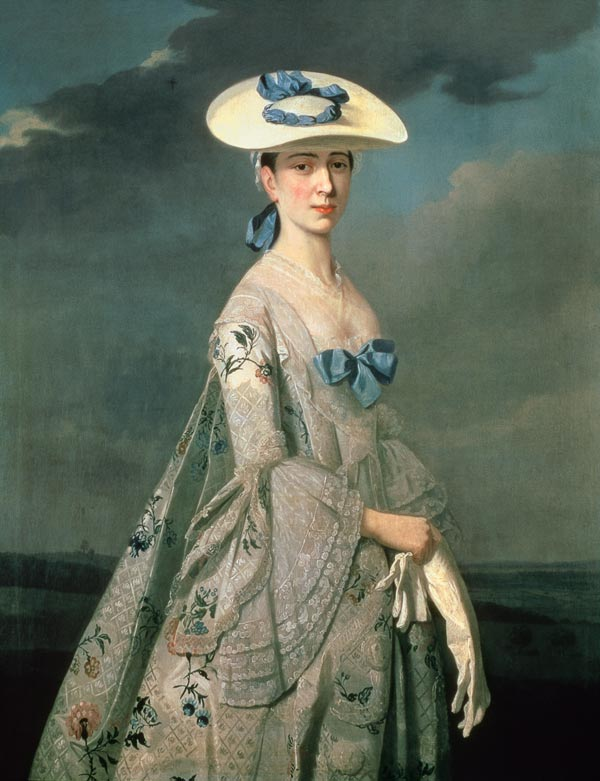
Eleanor Frances Dixie by Henry Pickering, painted c. 1753. Sack-back gown worn with embroidered lawn engageantes.

Fashions of 1861 show linen or cotton engageantes worn under pagoda sleeves.

Engageantes are false sleeves worn with women's clothing. They were worn during the 18th and 19th centuries, with a brief revival in the 20th century. In the 18th century, engageantes took the form of ruffles or flounces of linen, cotton, or lace, tacked to the elbow-length sleeves then fashionable.

In the mid-19th century, the term engageante was used for separate false sleeves, usually with fullness gathered tight at the wrist, worn under the open bell-shaped "pagoda" sleeves of day dresses. The fashion reappeared briefly just after the turn of the 20th century.
