= Portrait of Alexandra of Denmark =

Portrait of Alexandra of Denmark may refer to:

- Portrait of Alexandra of Denmark, a 1864 painting by Franz Xaver Winterhalter
- Portrait of Alexandra of Denmark, a 1893 painting by Luke Fildes
- Portrait of Alexandra of Denmark, a 1908 painting by François Flameng
