= The Parisian Diamond Company =

English jewellery firm (1889–1930)

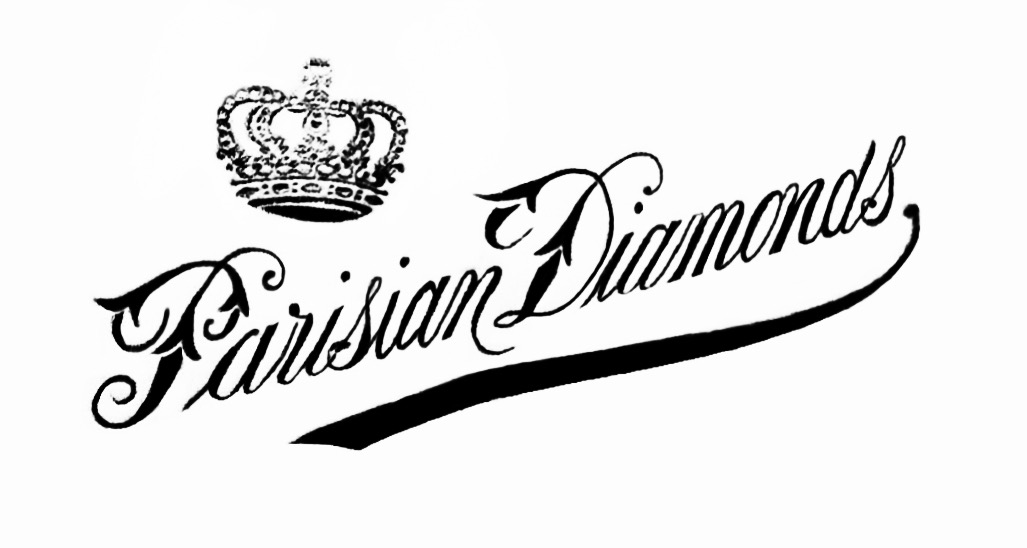
- Type: Private
- Industry: Manufacturers and mounters in imitation jewellery
- Founded: 1889 in London, England
- Defunct: c. 1930
- Key people: Walter Leighton Sanderson (director)

The Parisian Diamond Company, first established in 1889, was a London-based jewellery firm specialising in imitation pearls and glass-paste diamonds. The company operated from a number of premises, including 85 New Bond Street, 248 Regent Street, 143 Regent, 37, 38, and 43 Burlington Arcade, 325 Sauchiehall Street, Glasgow, and 'Paris.'

== History ==
=== Establishment ===
In 1873 the businessman Joseph MacGregor Crouch began trading in retail with a capital of £2,000, and from 1876 to 1879 is recorded as trading "in partnership with another person." A year prior to this partnership, Crouch married Annie Violet Sanderson, sister of Walter Leighton Sanderson who would subsequently come to be the director of The Parisian Diamond Company, and is, presumably, the unnamed business partner recorded.

In November of 1881, Crouch and Sanderson, then listed as jewellers at 203A and 221 Regent Street, dissolved their partnership. In 1889, Crouch, then owner of the Royal Scotch Jewellery Company at 264 Regent Street W., started an additional business under the style of 'The Parisian Diamond Company,' taking up premises at Burlington Arcade and New Bond Street. That same year the company won gold at the Exposition Universelle, Paris.

In 1891 Crouch sold the company stores "for £9,000 to his former partner." In February, the company announced that it had outgrown its Regent Street base and had purchased the business of The French Jewellery Company in Piccadilly Circus, while also making extensive additions to its London and Paris workshops. By September these additions were completed, with a purported staff force of "some Eighty Diamond Mounters and Setters."

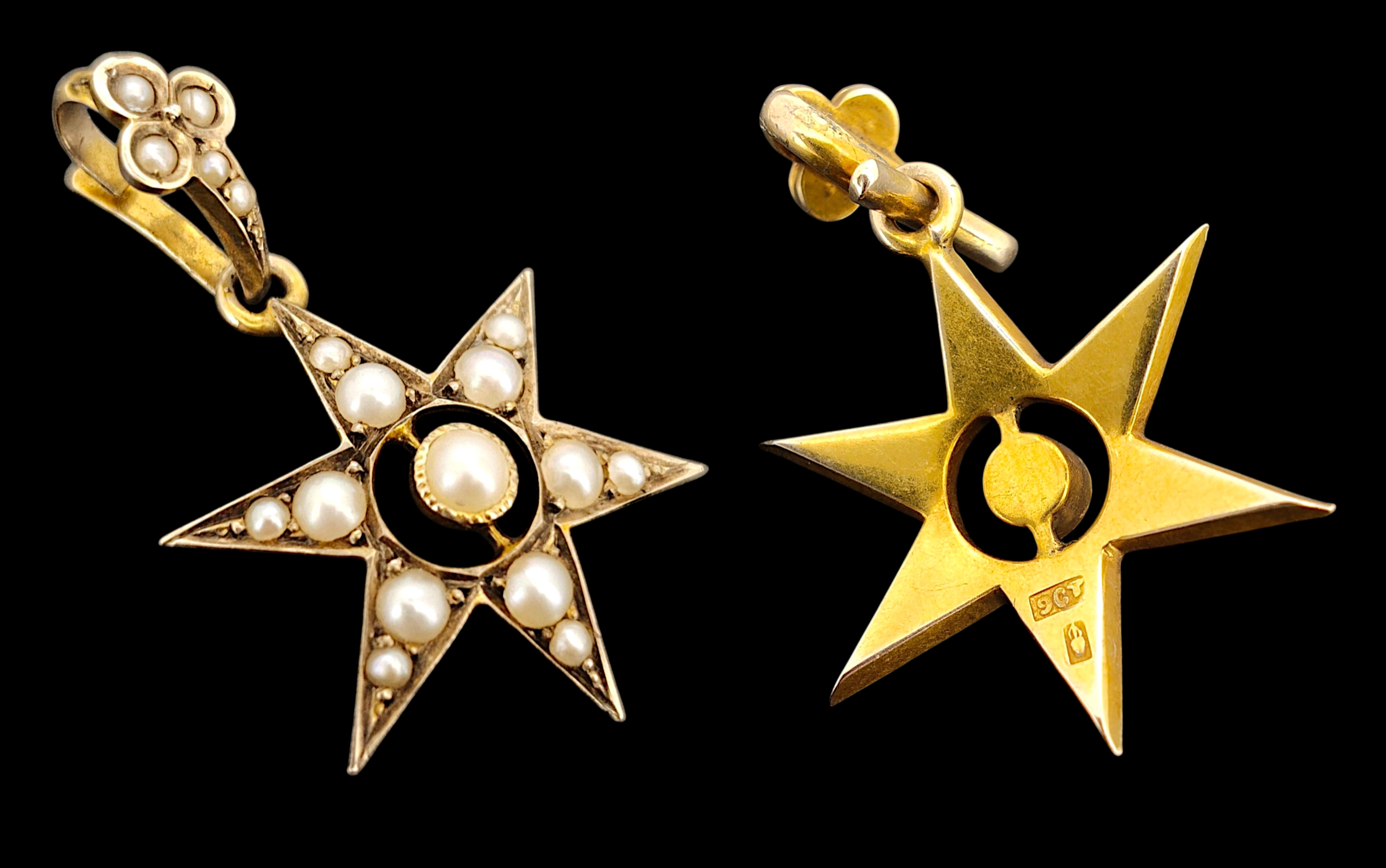
Star Pendant with company mark, as sold by Goldcrest Antique & Vintage.

On 23 September, 1892, Sanderson, then listed as a gold worker, registered one assay: his initials in the style of 'WLS.' This would differ to the company's registered mark. The following year, his former business partner and brother-in-law filed for bankruptcy, with accounts submitted indicating gross liabilities of £21,910, while Crouch's assets were only estimated to be worth £10,822. Initial reporting of the debtor suggested he was still affiliated with The Parisian Diamond Company, an implication then retracted; as The Morning Post reported, "We are informed that he [Crouch] has no connection whatever with that Company, the business carried on by which are now the sole property of Mr. W. L. Sanderson."

In August of 1897 the company, under Sanderson's direction, was awarded a gold medal at The Victorian Era Exhibition for "the Orient pearls and perfection in diamond mounting and setting."

=== Australian branches ===
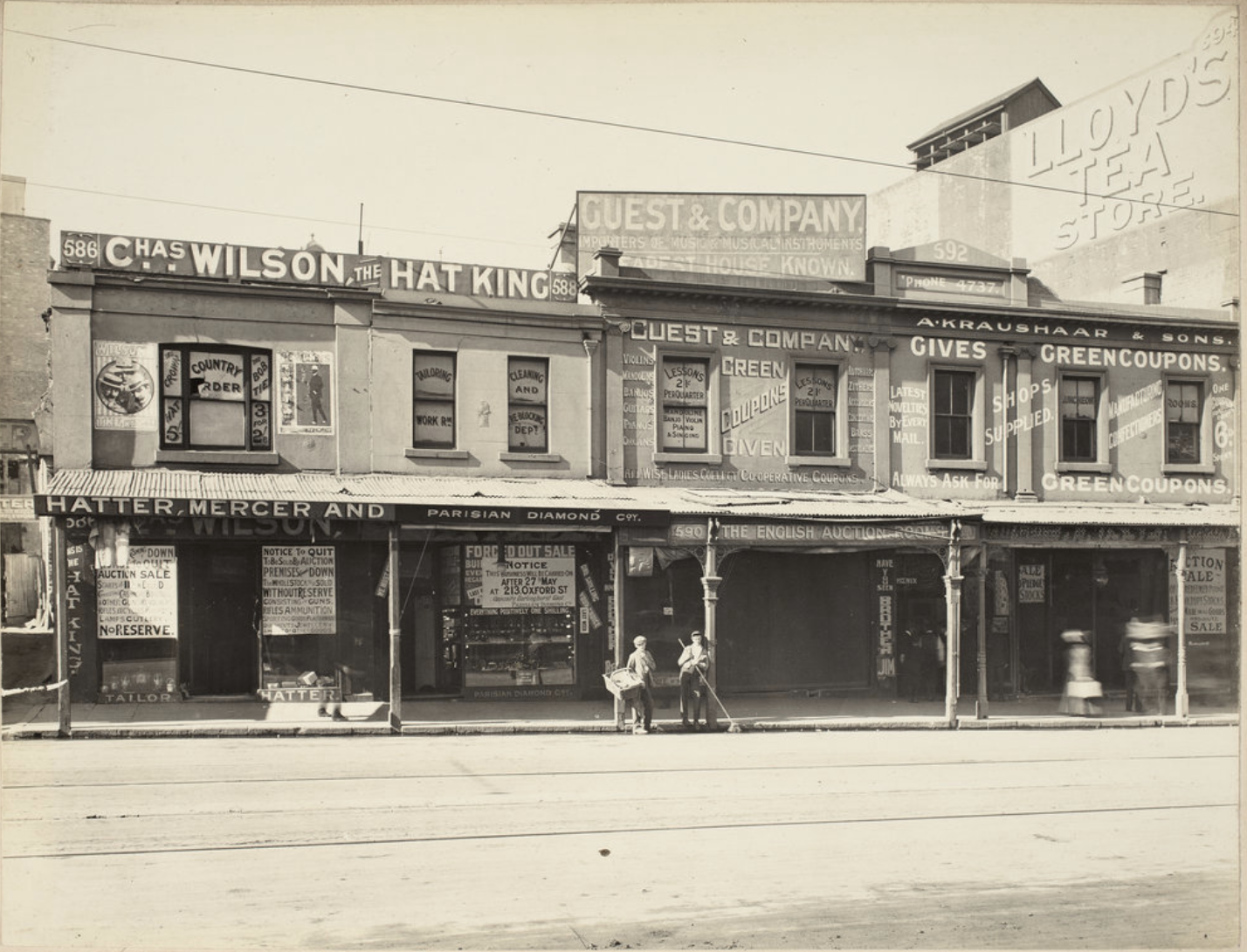
Parisian Diamond Co. at 588 George Street, Sydney c.1900

In August of 1900, a new firm was advertised: the company’s Southern Australian branch, with a showroom situated at 60 Brookman's Buildings, Grenfell Street, Adelaide. Messrs. Anderson and Hall are listed as agents for the Parisian Diamond Company of London, providing "first-class stock at prices as cheap as it is possible to make them." As part of this venture, Anderson and Hall were able to supply products from the London catalogue, with only the cost of duties added. Another pair appear to be working as Australian agents for the company around this same time: Sydney Plowman Harris and Albert Ernest Cartmell Tovey. Together they operated as imitation jewellery merchants, under the Barios Diamonds Company, at 52 Swanston Street, Melbourne, and the Parisian Diamond Company, at 239 Pitt Street, Sydney. The company may well have had other Australian branches; the City of Sydney Archives holds a photograph of the Parisian Diamond Company's premises at 588 George Street, Sydney, marked for demolition.

In 1904, a fire broke out at Waterhouse Chambers, King William Street, at the work and store room of Anderson and Hall. The incident report suggests that the damages would be covered by the London branch who had the shop's stock, fittings, and tools insured for £800. Harris and Tovey fared worse still, the company filed for bankruptcy in 1913 at the Melbourne Insolvency Court, with debts accumulating from both the Melbourne and Sydney shops totalling £1,131, while combined assets reached just short of this at £915. They attributed this debt to the heavy expenses of running the Sydney branch along with a general "falling off in trade."

=== Press coverage ===
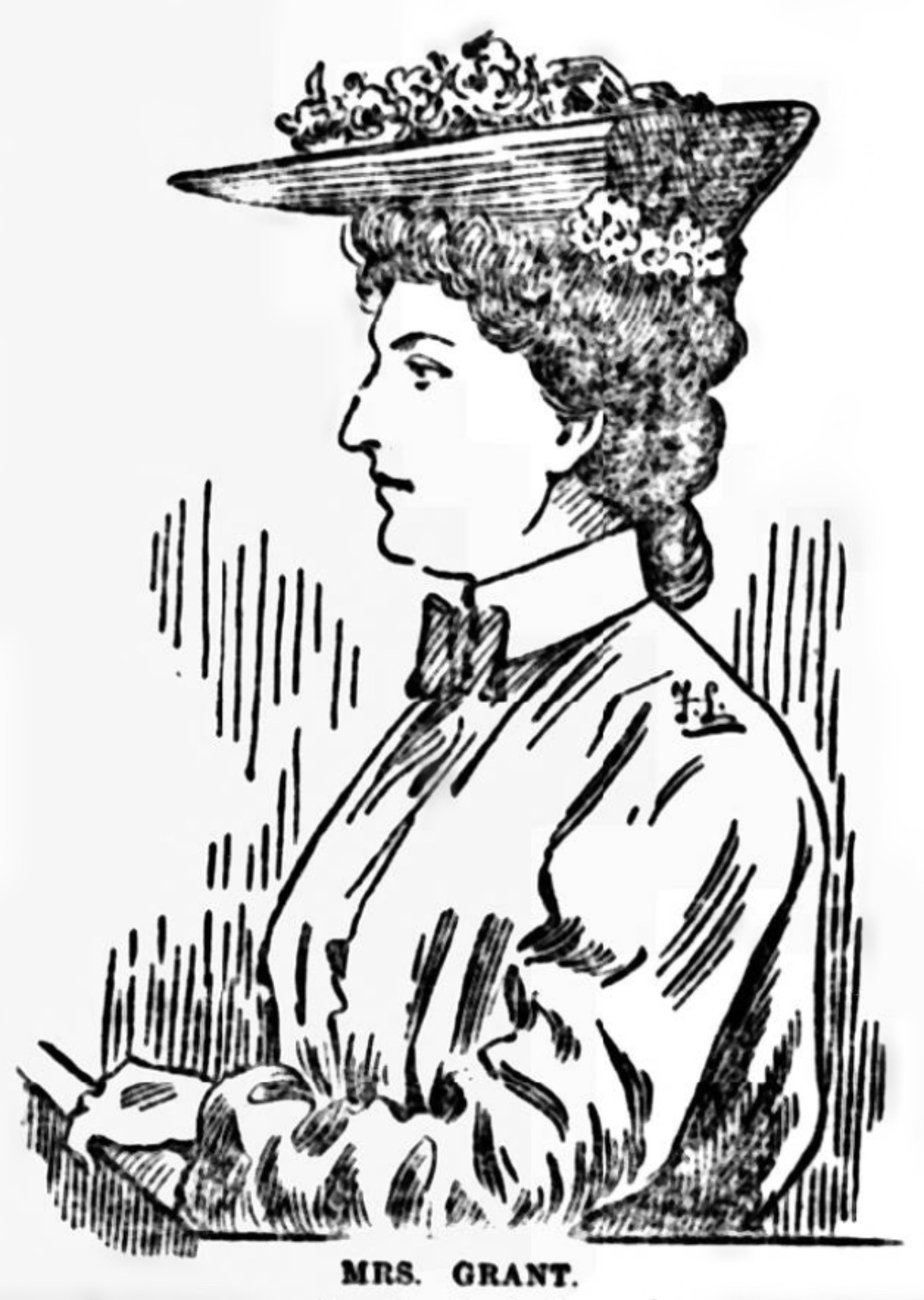
Annie Gleason posing as Mrs. Grant, 1905

On 29 June, 1905, Mrs. Annie Gleason, the so-called "Princess of thieves" attempted to steal a valuable pearl necklace from Christie's auction rooms on Bond Street by replacing it with a string of The Parisian Diamond Company's imitation pearls. The notorious criminal Mary Anne Duignan records the theft in her 1928 autobiography, describing how the scheme was devised in a Liverpool hotel room by Harry Bennett and Baby Thompson. The pair furnished Gleason, who had absconded from an American jail twelve months earlier, with a silk dress, carriage, coachman, and footman, enabling her to pose as a wealthy widow and the niece of General Grant.

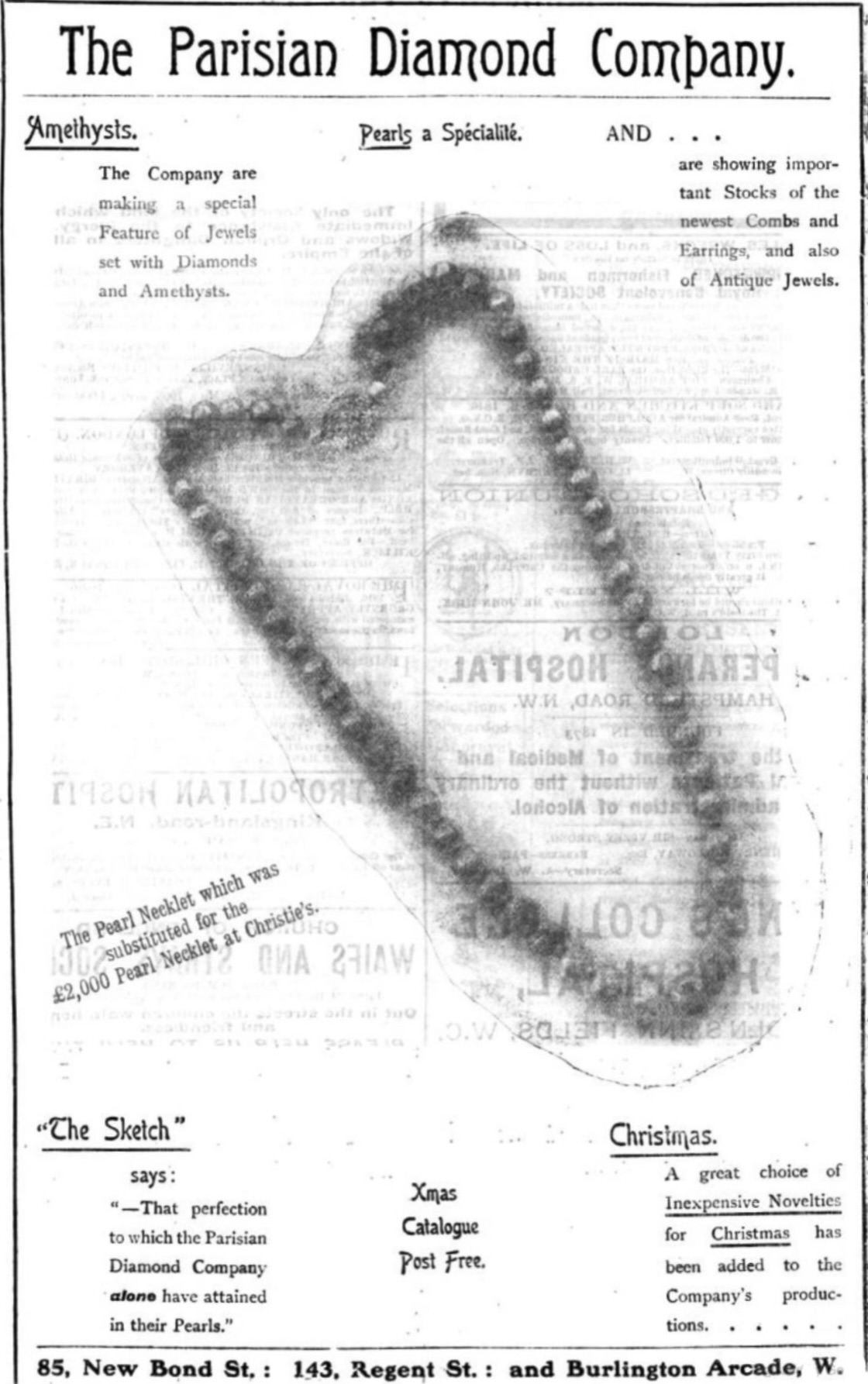
The Pearl Necklet which was substituted for the £2,000 Pearl Necklet at Christie's.

Gleason had seen a photograph of the necklace, which was to be put up for auction, and went to Christie's to examine it. Feigning uncertainty as to whether she made the purchase, she then went to the Parisian Diamond Company's Regent Street shop where, by "a remarkable feat of memory" she was able to describe the exact graduation of each pearl, and had a replica necklace made up at a cost of £5. Returning to Christie's, Gleason took away the real necklace and dropped the imitation article from her handkerchief onto the tray. Upon her departure, a jewellery merchant by the name of Davis went to examine the pearls and noticed the necklace's trade tab and realised it was white rather than the company's trademark buff. As Gleason attempted to flee, she stashed the pearls in a doorway where they were later recovered. She was arrested, indicted at the Old Bailey on 25 July for the theft of "a necklace worth £1,700", and subsequently sentenced to three years' imprisonment at HMP Aylesbury. Contemporary reports variously valued the necklace at £2,000, £5,000, and $10,000. The Parisian Diamond Company would go on to use photographs of the substituted pearls in their advertising material.

Following the overthrow of Portugal’s monarchy in 1910, King Manuel sought refuge in the UK, where he reportedly visited one of the company's London stores, much to the amusement of the press. The Herald and Weekly Times reported that, while shopping, the king "was delighted with the Parisian Diamond Company, where millions of pounds worth of jewels are exhibited–in marvelous imitation. A version of this boy of a King standing admiringly with his pale face pressed against the glass of a paste-shop, with his blase aides-de-camp fidgeting behind him, had its humors."

=== Decline ===
On 6 May, 1913, Sanderson arrived at the company's Regent-street offices complaining of feeling ill. He proceeded to fall forward and die before he could receive the aid of a doctor. He was 45 years old at the time of his death, and left behind a will of £16,652. Operations continued at The Parisian Diamond Company but by the mid 1920s the business's scope had been reduced to just one trading store at 37 Burlington Arcade, W. The last of the company's advertisements appeared in November of 1929 and by 1930 it appears that operations had ceased.

== Advertising ==
=== Competitions and prizes ===
The company were prolific in their marketing approach, as Harry Quilter's 1902 guide to London jewellers describes, "They advertise a great deal." Full page spreads with detailed illustrations of the jewels on offer were taken out across various ladies' papers, and the company offered their illustrated catalogue, which could be sent by post, free to the applicant. From around 1891, the company worked alongside The Gentlewoman, providing prizes to the paper's 'Problems for Prizes' initiative for roughly two decades. Among these awards for problem-solvers included a gold horseshoe brooch, a gold and orient pearl muff chain, and several pearl necklaces. In 1896 at the Grand Fancy Costume Carnival, Olympia, the company similarly awarded prizes to "the most artistic dress."

=== Dressing high society ===
Part of the company's marketing ploy involved fashioning high society events. The Parisian Diamond Company supplied the ladies' jewels for Sullivan and Gilbert's 1893 opera Utopia, Limited. In 1897 the company went on to provide jewellery to the attendees of the Devonshire House Fancy Dress Ball, including jewelled girdles and collars of such finery that, according to The World, they were "impossible to detect from the real ones." It was also suggested that one "very great lady" had been lent diamonds worth £13,000. The saturation of advertising was so great that at Mrs. Vernon Ford's Annual Fancy Dress Ball in 1904, one Miss McConnell came costumed as the company itself, in one of the "most striking fancy dresses" there.

During the Parisian Diamond Co.'s run, imitation jewels were largely considered spurious and cheap, a reputation the company sought to dispense with. The 1899 Jewelers' Review described this "prejudice" against paste jewellery as having been overcome; evidenced by the fact that the "greater portion of the company's clientele" were members of the "haute aristocratic." Though as John Strachan argues in his book Advertising, Literature and Print Culture in Ireland, 1891-1922 (2012), this was a farce, the company produced jewellery intended to appeal to an "aspirational middle-class readership rather than the haut ton who do not generally wear costume jewellery." Strachan also criticises the use of the company's explicitly "pseudo-French name," a bid, he argues, "to exoticise their wares" and "associate themselves with a prestige culture." Among the company's listed store locations that appear in their advertisements, a workshop in 'Paris' is repeatedly cited, conspicuously omitting a full address. In the case of The Parisian Diamond Company, Strachan finds no other French signifier, beyond the trading name, in the brand's copy.

=== London premises ===
Another avenue for marketing were the company's shopfronts. In 1895, The Artist reported that Luke Fildes' portrait of the Princess of Wales, captioned "the fashion in pearls," was being used in the window of the company's Burlington Arcade premises. The journal described this use of advertisement as particularly "adroit" given the "important part these subaquatic treasures play in the personal adornment of our Princess," who was known for her fondness for pearls.

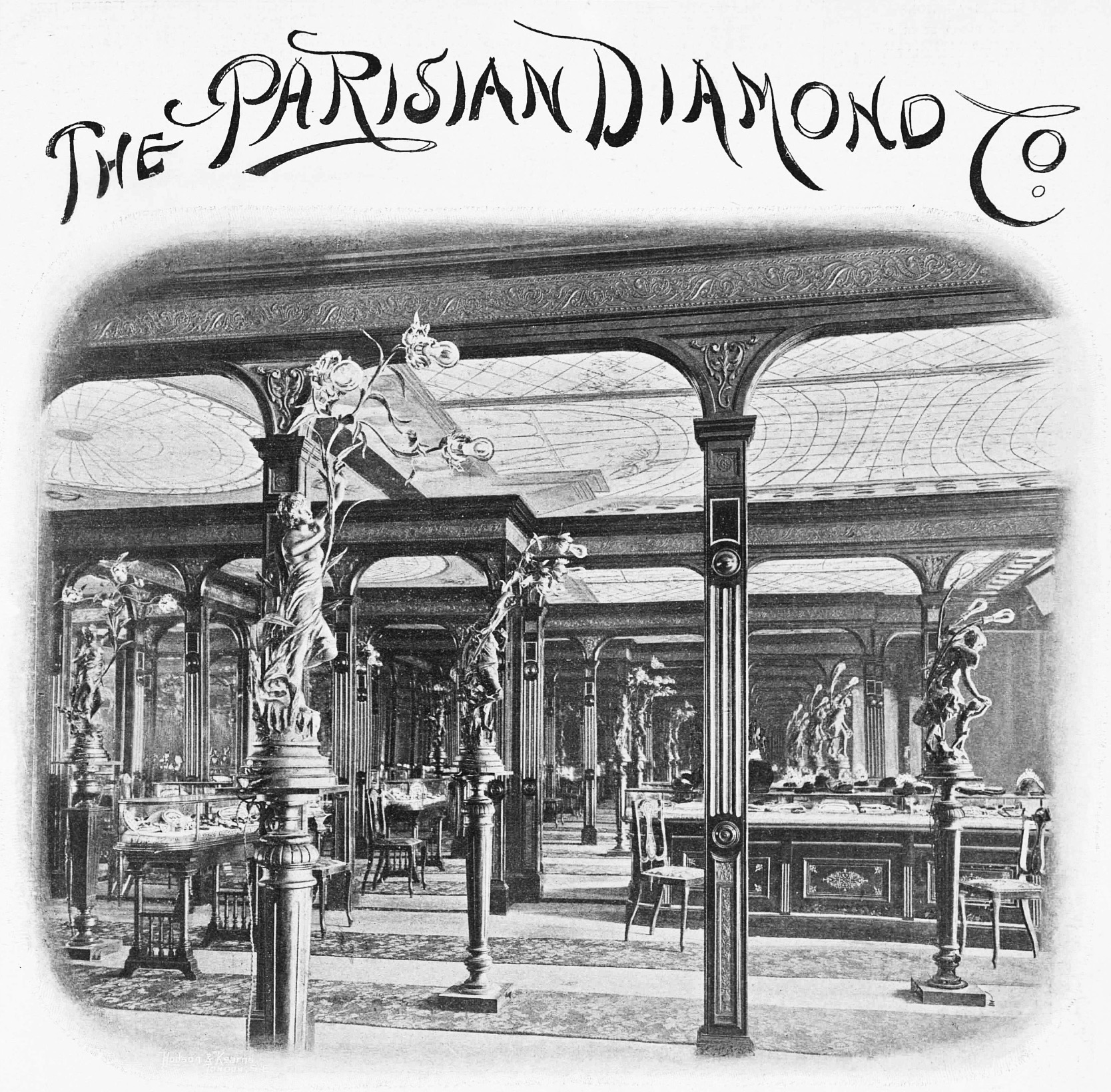
The Parisian Diamond Co.'s showroom at 143 Regent Street

In 1897 the company opened a new trading centre at 143 Regent Street and offered an exclusive press release to the Illustrated Sporting and Dramatic News. The editor described these premises not as a shop but as a "temple of diamonds," or rather, "it is the shop of the future, when Industry will have wedded Art." This they likened to the interior of a museum, its ceiling painted by Conradi, presumably the British artist Moritz Conradi, in itself, worthy of a visit. The editor describes jewels sat on pale pink satin, black and gold counters decorated with trusses carved to resemble cupids, and Louis-Seize-style furniture in pink silk damask. The paper also admired the "perfection" of the electric light fittings: copper lilies held up by bronze statues sculpted by Moreau. The finishings all together made for "the most artistically beautiful shop in London."

Not all publications were quite as flattering. In Beau Brummel’s journal Fashion, one 1899 article described the "commercial decline" of Burlington Arcade, citing the Parisian Diamond Company, where before there was no fear of imitation goods, today, "'B-R-A-S-S spells 'gold' and G-L-A-S-S spells 'diamond.'" This change in the character of trading, the editor describes, must be rejected, in order to prevent "the spread of a class of trade that belongs by right to the piers and back streets of seaside towns."

=== Specialty jewellery ===
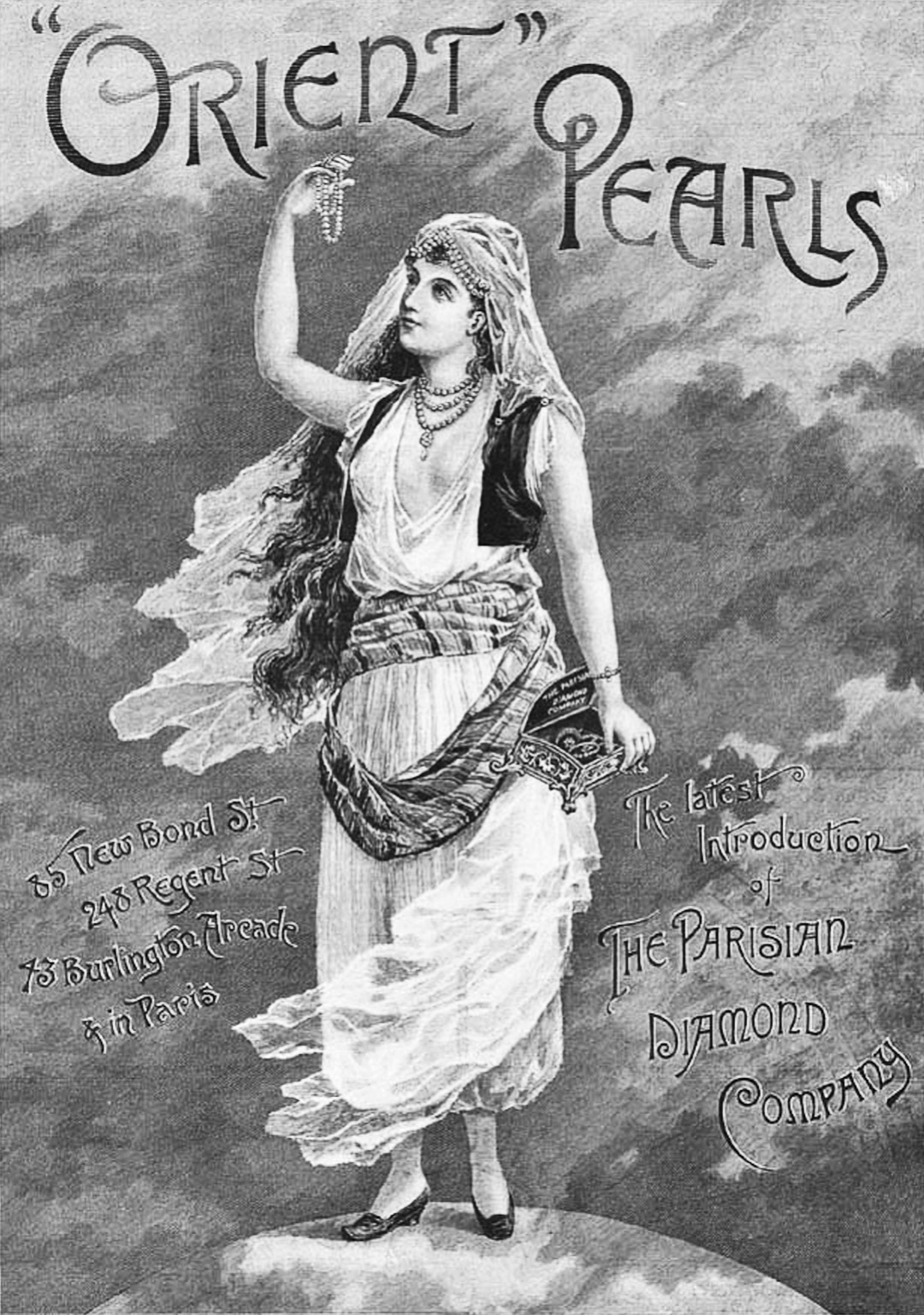
Advertisement for 'Orient Pearls,' 1892

The company's specialty 'Orient' pearls were, according to their advertising material, "the magic of the modern chemist." Around the turn of the century, several glass-paste manufacturers opened, providing imitation pearls for cheap jewellery often known as articles de Bohème. The company stressed the indistinguishable quality of their pearls, repeatedly citing experts as being unable to discern the real from the fake. Part of this marketing scheme to acclimatise the public to imitation goods included discrediting real pearls. As the St. James's Budget reported in 1895, real pearls had long been considered unlucky:

"They are endowed with a sort of elemental life; they fall ill, and have to be taken out for an airing. Their origin is a disease of the oyster, and they are human enough to die! The divers' perils seem to cling to them, and they bear the jealous mermaid's curse, for are they not stolen from the deep to deck the golden tresses of their earthly rivals?"

The orient pearls, however, bore none of this misfortune and were free to be worn with "a light heart."

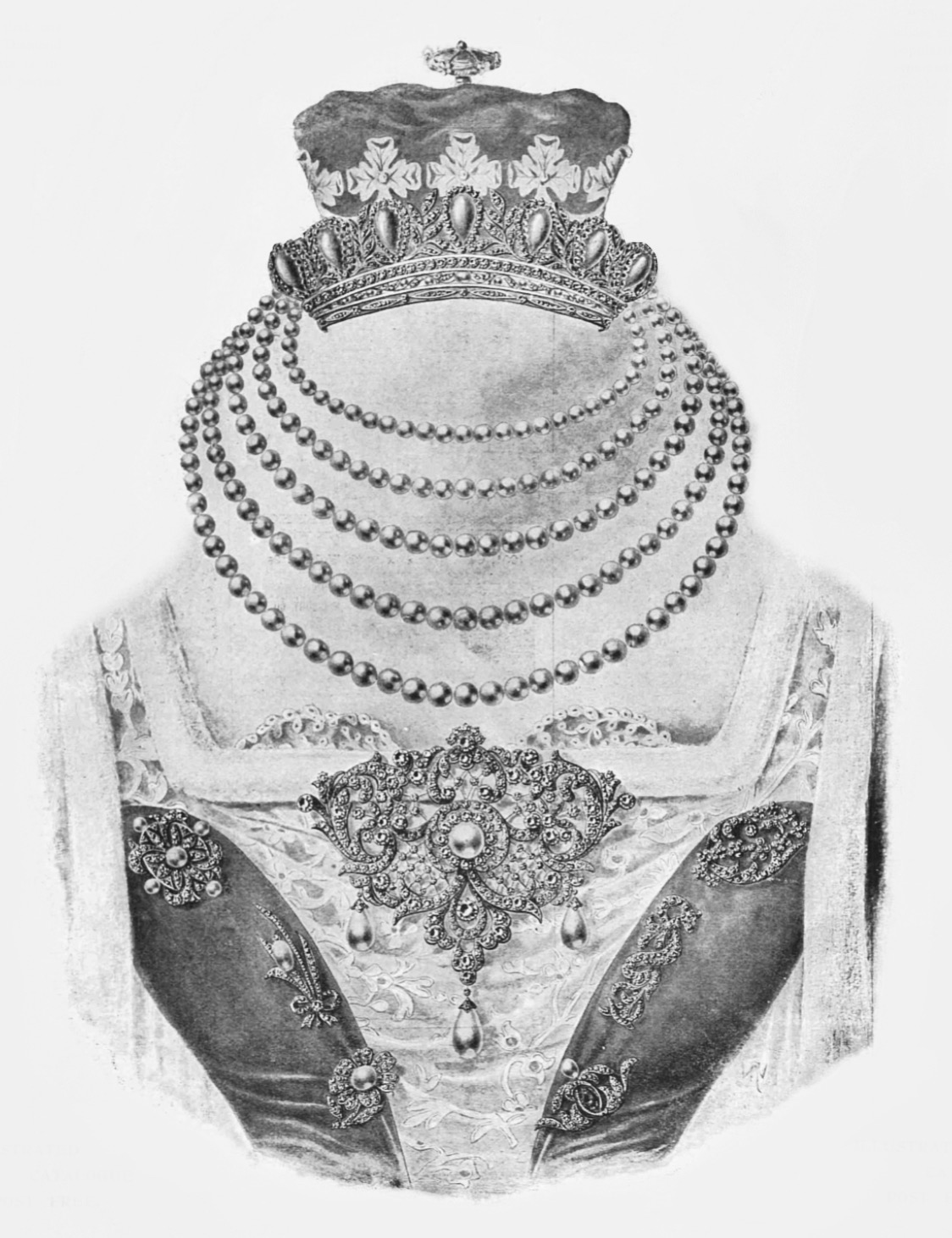
Pearl collars and tiara, 1902

The matter of dispensability was also central to the company's marketing of pearls. Emphasis was placed on buyers being able to "do away with bank safes" and "the discomfort of suspecting servants" by buying cheap replicas. They were frequently recommended in The Lady's Pictorial correspondence columns as a handy substitute to invest in for fear of losing one's real jewels. Between 1926 and 1928, the company promoted a new speciality pearl, the 'Akita,' a gem they promoted as being "faithfully matched" as to appear uniform in a rope necklace or festoon.

Following the death of Queen Victoria in 1901, changes in the etiquette of mourning jewellery created new commercial opportunities for the company. In Fabulous Fakes (1988), Vivienne Becker describes how the company, then a leading wholesaler in paste jewellery, promoted designs incorporating imitation diamonds and pearls alongside love-knot and iris motifs, which were mounted in items such as hair combs, chokers, and bracelets. For the coronation of Edward VII and Alexandra in 1902, the company also marketed imitation versions of royal tiaras.

== Literary References ==
Passing mentions of the company's deceptive pearls are made in Clarence Forestier-Walker's book The Derelict and Tommy (1900) and Neilson Morris's play The River of Light, A Play in One Act (1917).

Edith Wharton's 1913 tragicomedy novel The Custom of the Country makes reference to the company name in the letter heading used by the character Charles Bowen:

"'The Parisian Diamond Company – Anglo-American branch.' Charles Bowen, seated one rainy evening of the Paris season, in a corner of the great Nouveau Luxe restaurant, was lazily trying to resolve his impressions of the scene into the phrases of a letter to his old friend Mrs Henley Fairford."

Whether this constitutes a direct reference to the London-based Parisian Diamond Company or to a fictional business of the same name is yet unknown. An American company selling imitation diamonds by the same name was registered under J. Edward Creevey in 1901, but makes no mention of its possible connection to the London firm.

Author John Jay Chapman interprets the letterhead as symbolising "Bowen's view of the international society that American commercial success has helped to create." Chapman argues that the "phantom society'" depicted in the novel is characterised by imitation and superficiality, reflecting what he describes as the "habit of imitating the imitation." Within this reading, the Parisian Diamond Company serves as an emblem of transatlantic commercial culture and social pretension; the product itself ostensibly being an export of France.

== Catalogue ==
The company stocked and sold a variety of goods, most often in the prevailing 'garland' or Edwardian style of jewellery, with designs styled after Louis Seize and Marie Antoinette. Stars and crescents were popular motifs, as well as stylised animals such as squirrels, spiders, lizards, owls, and butterflies.

The catalogue included hair ornaments such as side combs, tiaras, aigrettes, and hair prongs; dress accessories including brooches, paste buckles, buttons, stomachers, dress chains for carrying muffs or lorgnettes, and scarf pins; traditional jewellery such as necklaces, bracelets, earrings, chokers, rings, pearl collars, and pearl ropes; and novelty items including diamond-chain baubles.

The company also marketed patented inventions by its proprietor. In June of 1894, Sanderson patented a gold "zither ring", a finger ring fitted with five strings that, according to The Lady's Pictorial, produced "a good, equal, and mellow tone, from all five finger-board strings."

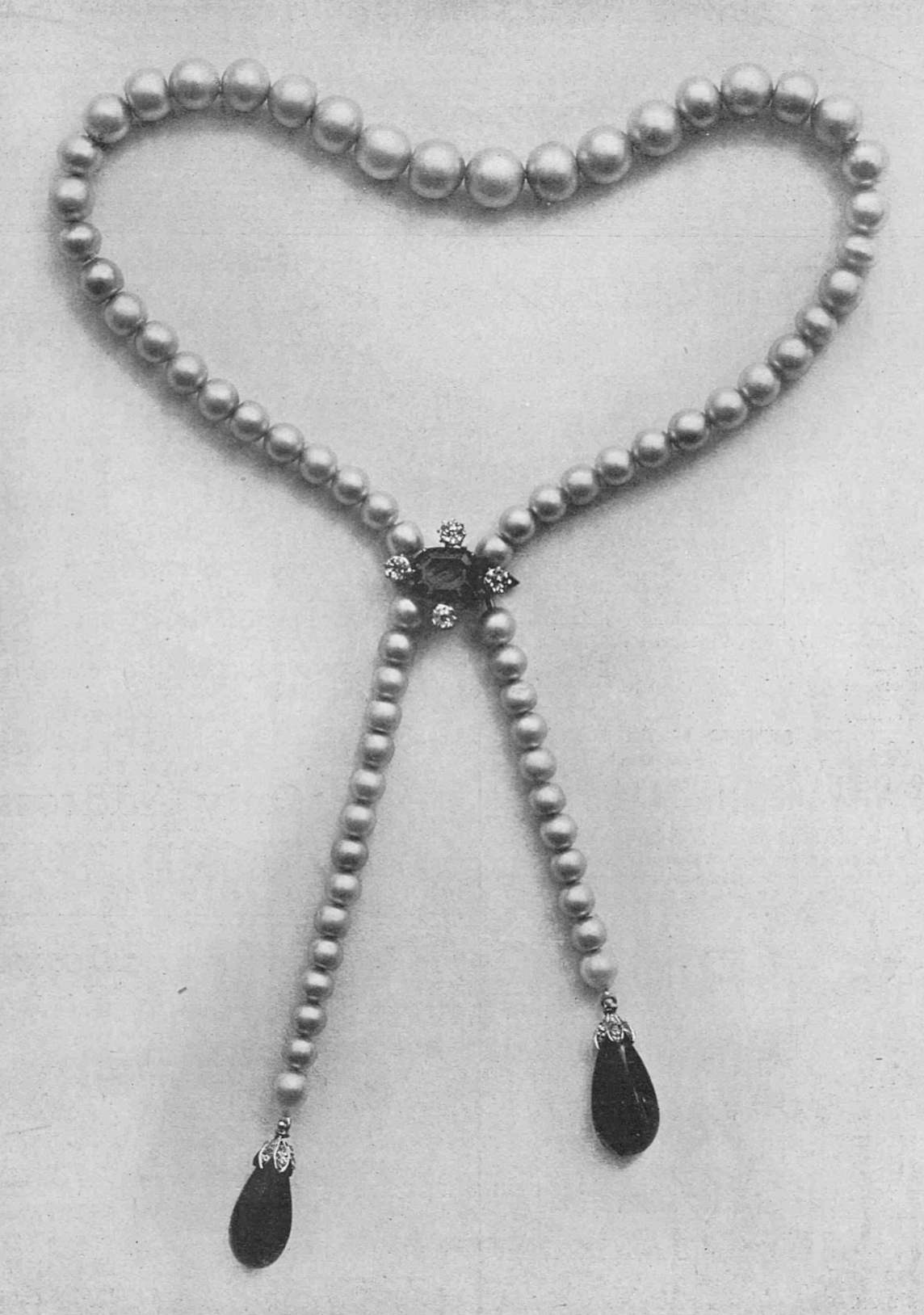
Orient Pearls, 1901

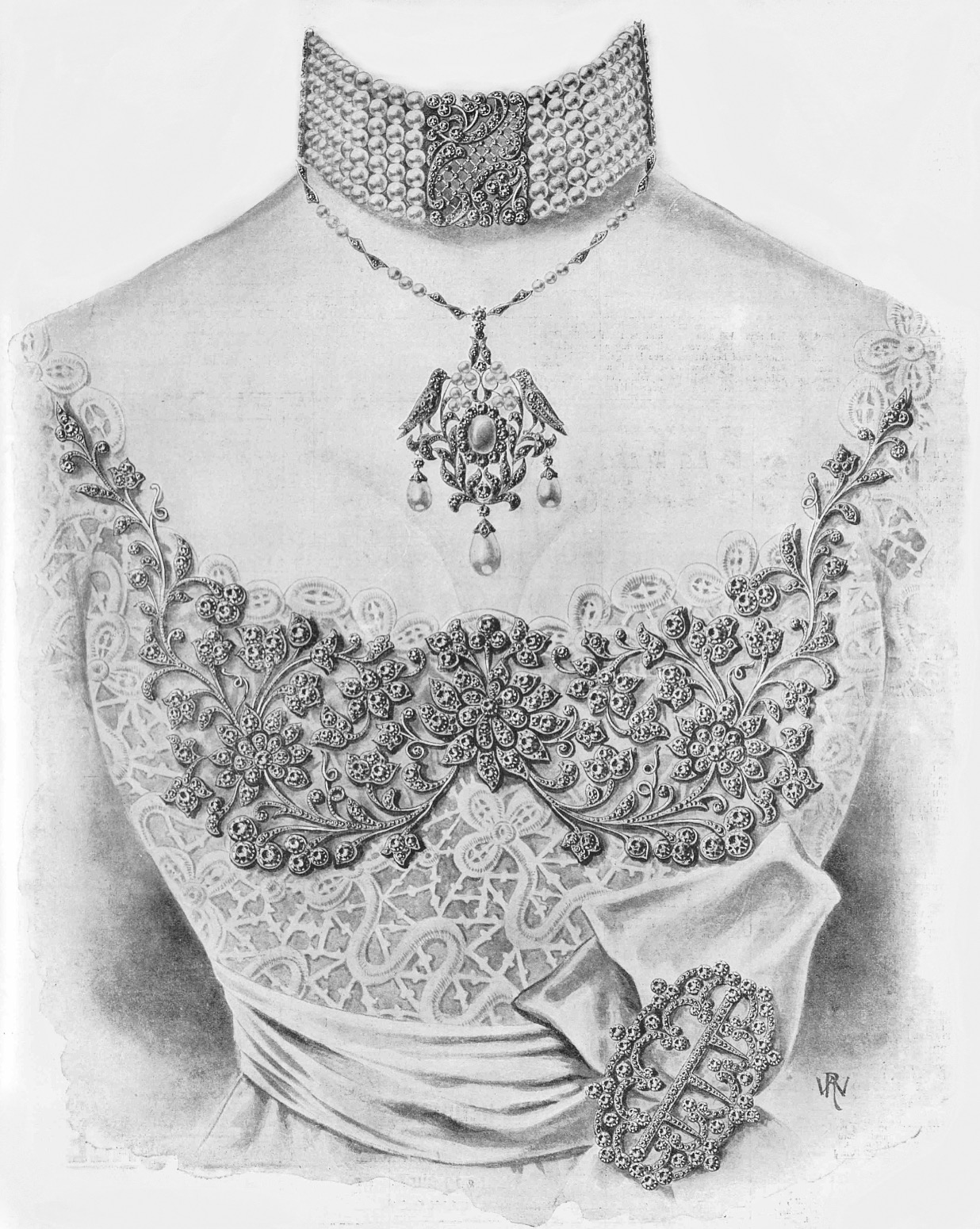
Pearl choker, 1902

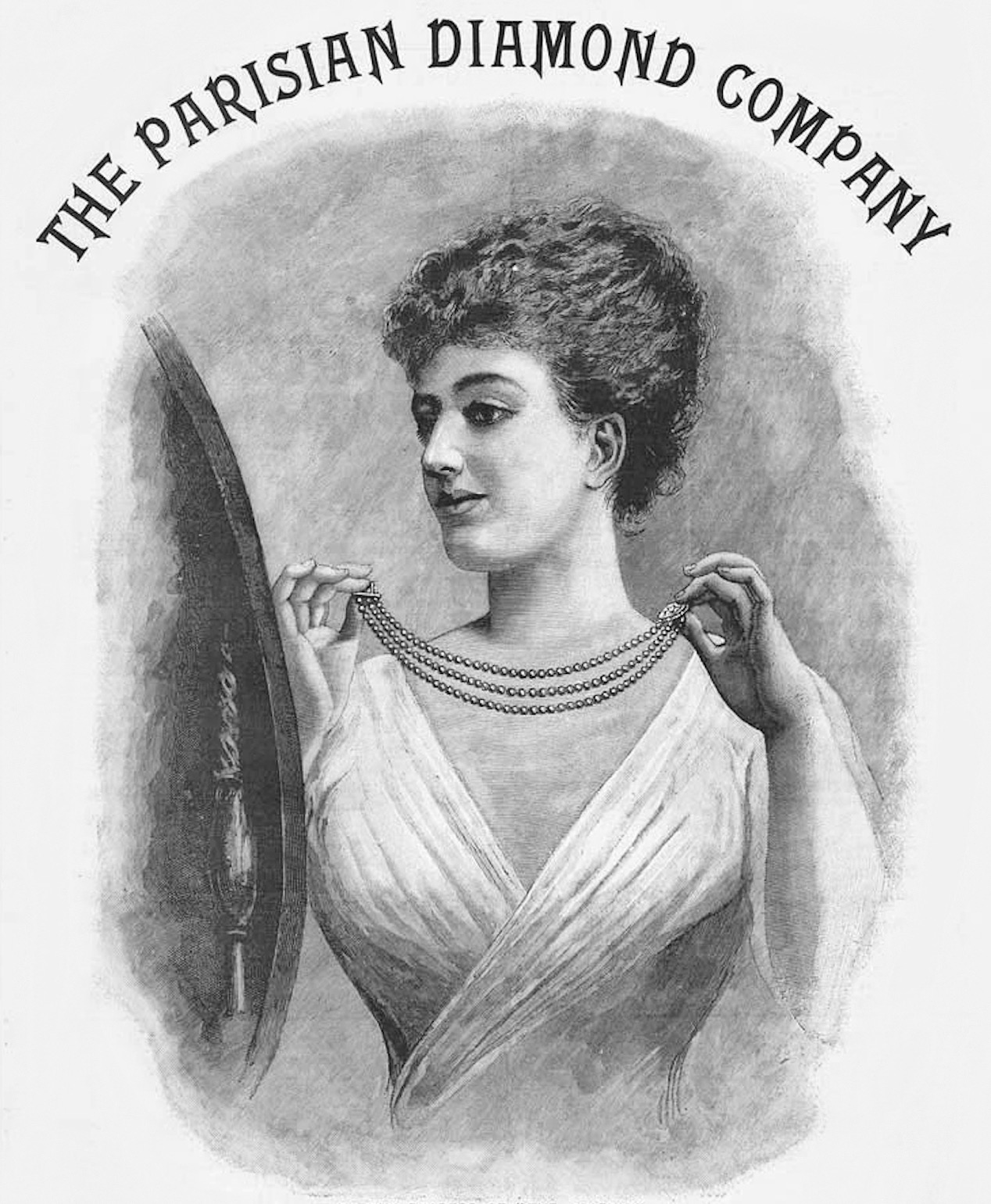
Pearl ropes, 1892

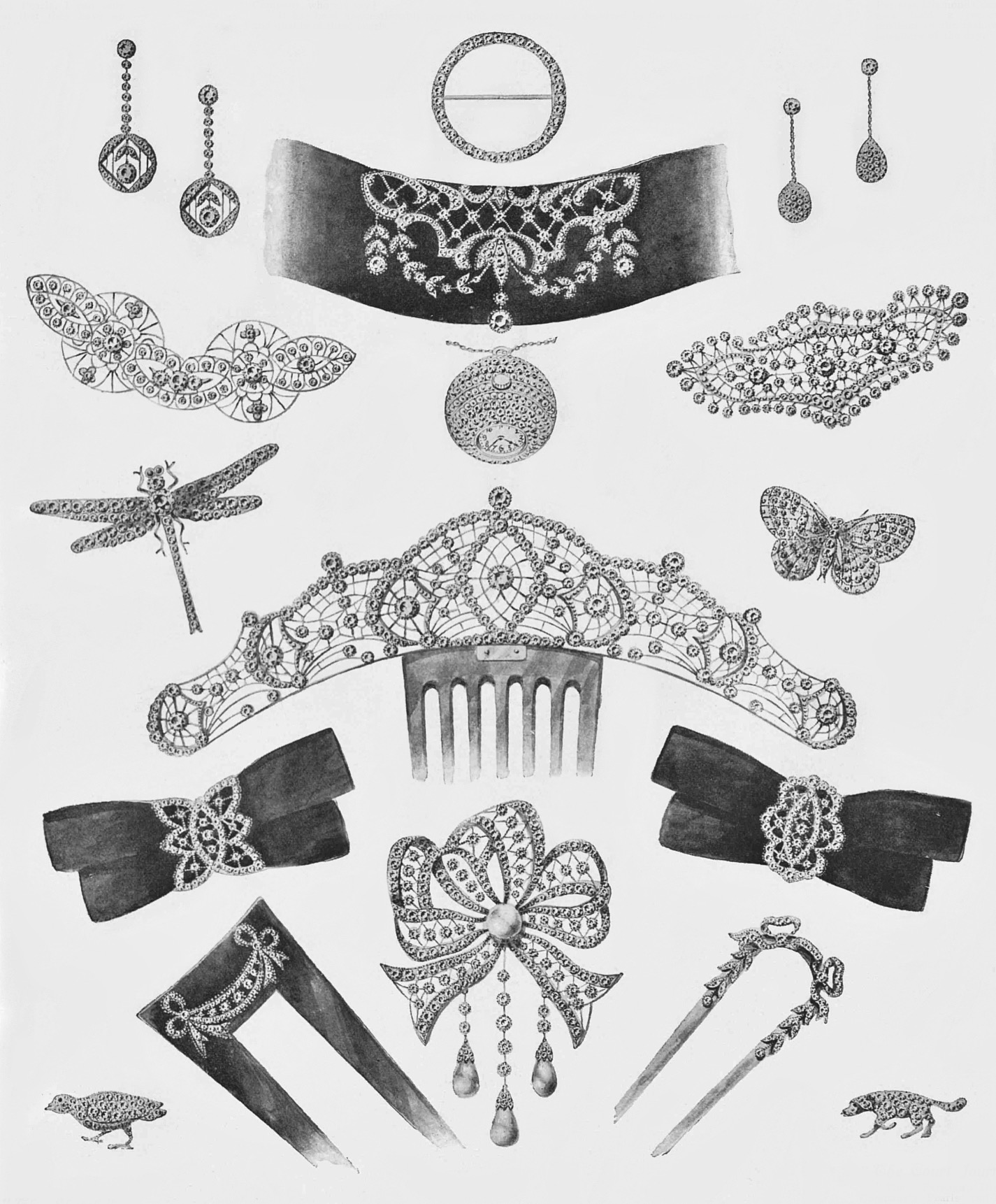
The Parisian Diamond Company's Illustrated Catalogue, 1912

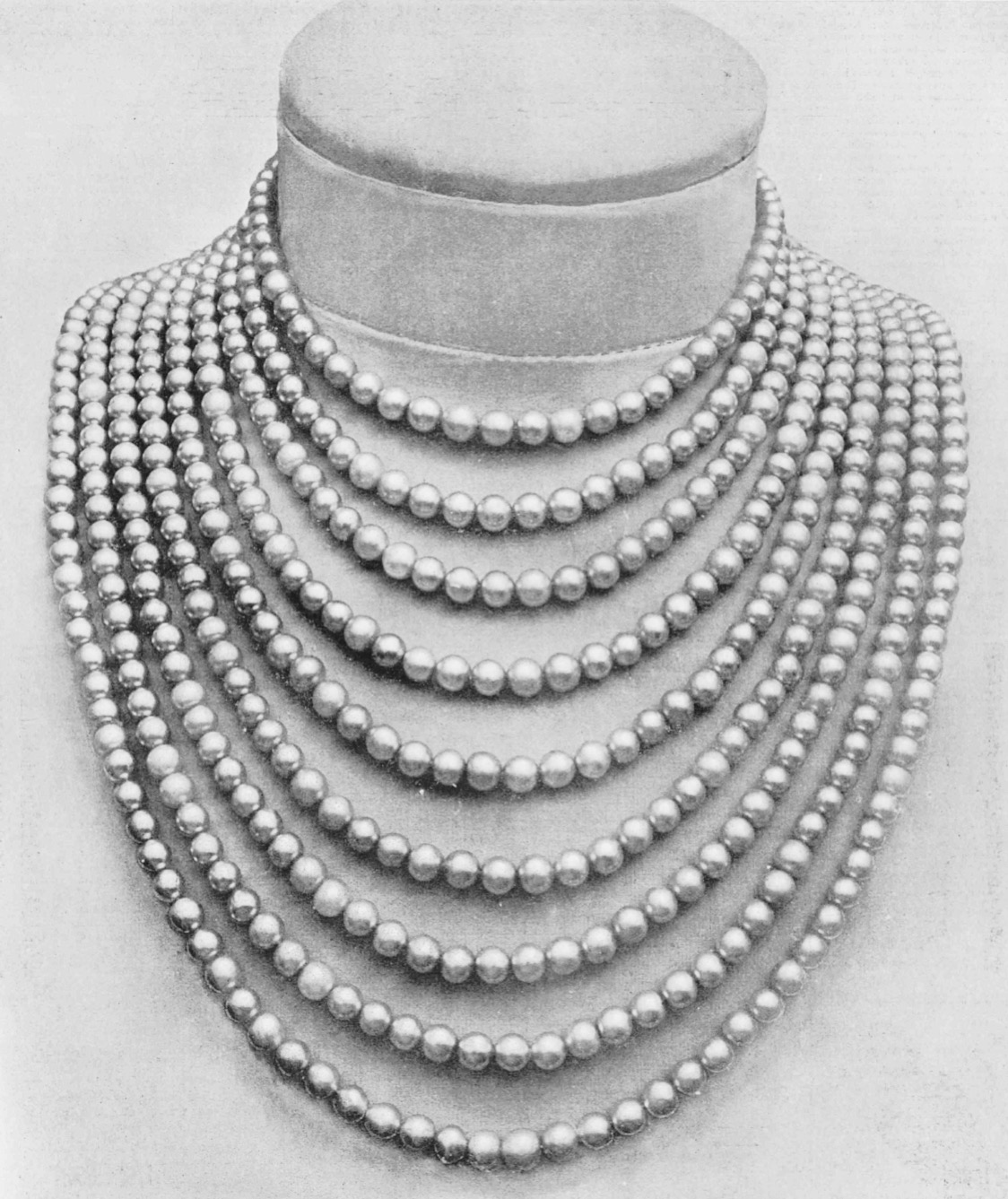
Orient Pearls, 1901

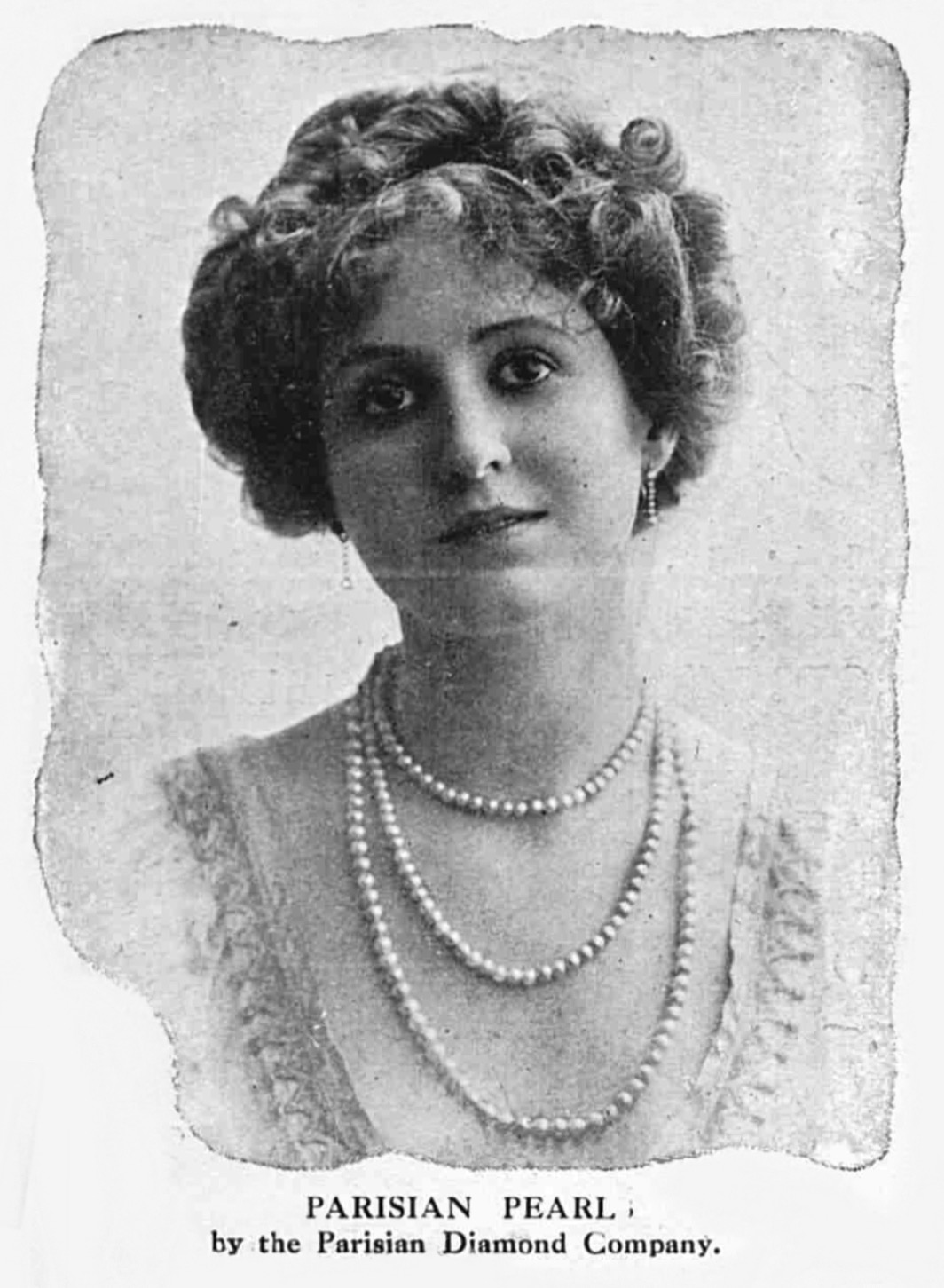
Parisian Pearl, c.1900

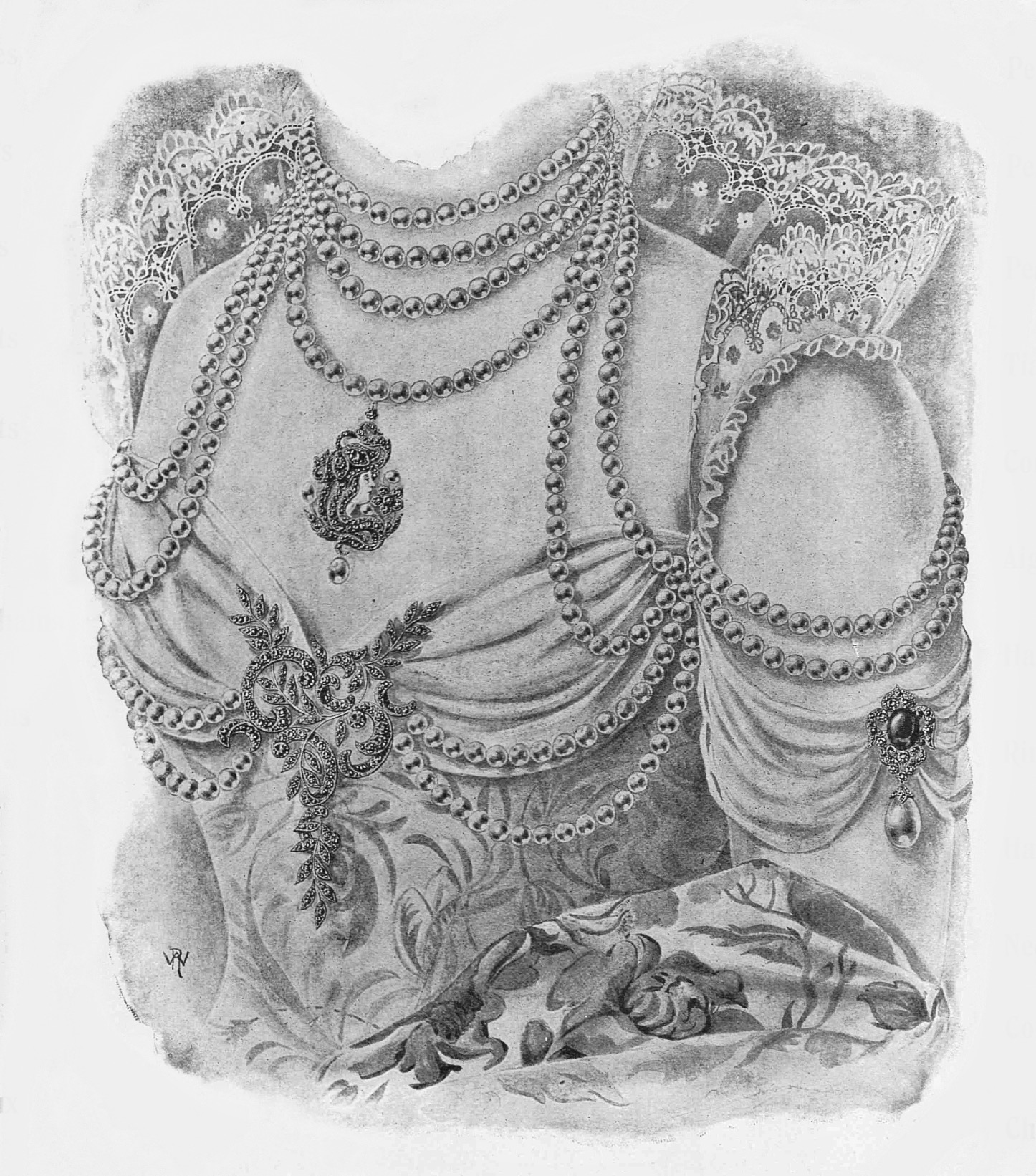
Pearl ropes, 1902
