= Stomacher =

Decorative panel to fill in the front opening of a dress or bodice

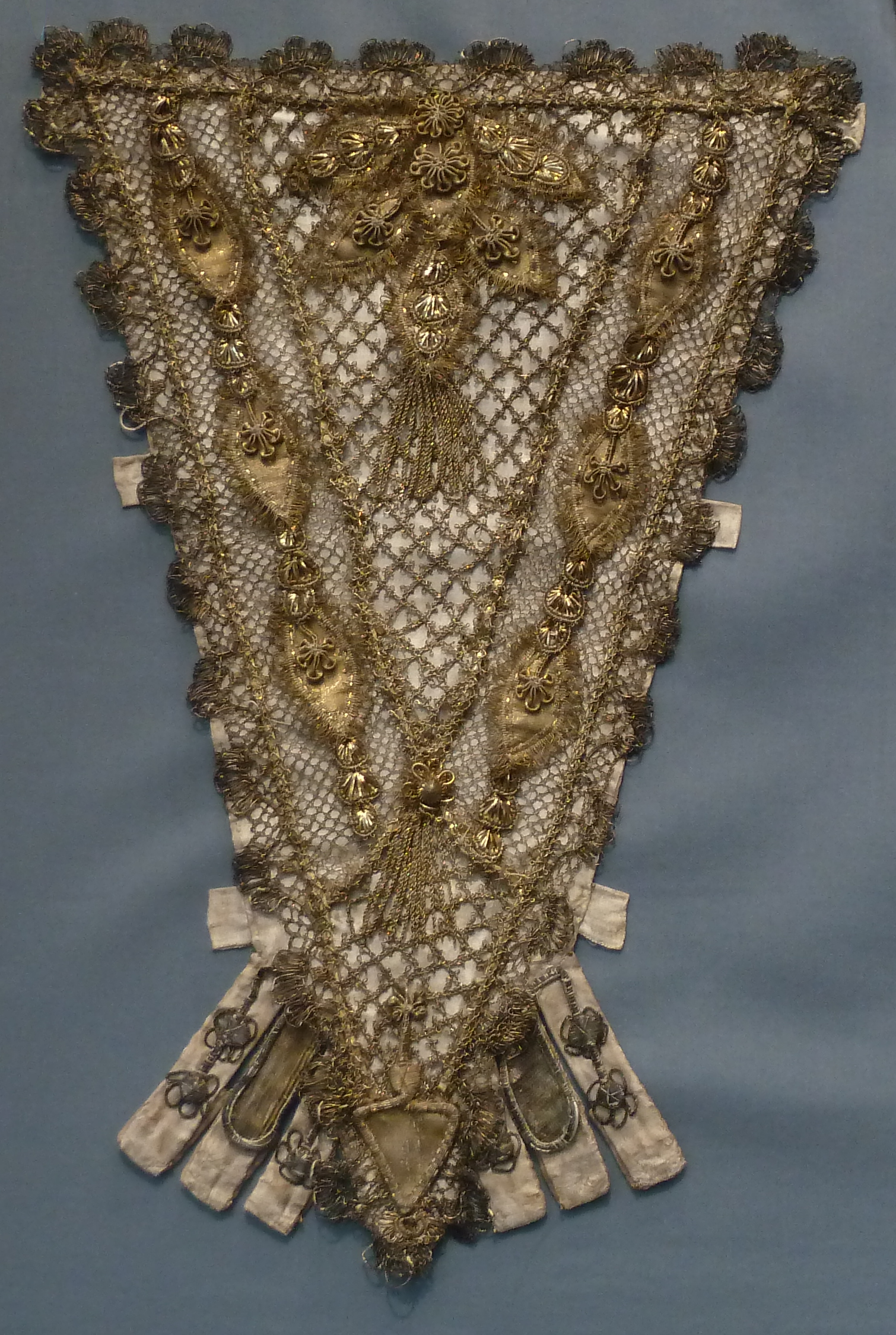
Stomacher, France, 1700–1750. Silk satin with metallic-thread lace, appliqués, passementerie and tassels. Los Angeles County Museum of Art M.67.8.99.

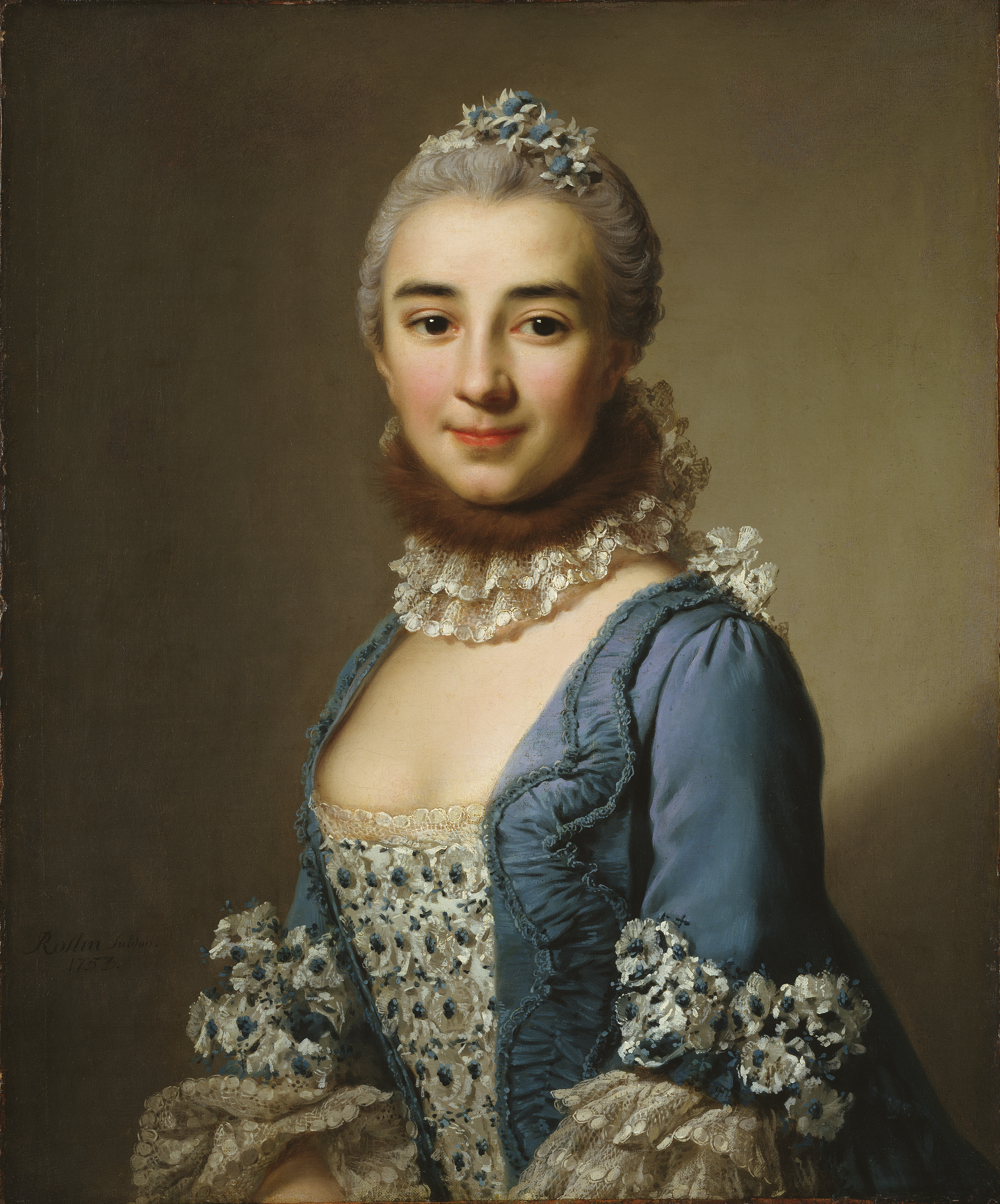
Open gown over stomacher, 1753

A stomacher is a decorated triangular panel that fills in the front opening of a woman's gown or bodice. The stomacher may be boned, as part of a stays, or may cover the triangular front of a corset. If simply decorative, the stomacher lies over the triangular front panel of the stays, being either stitched or pinned into place, or held in place by the lacings of the gown's bodice.

A stomacher may also be a piece or set of jewellery to ornament a stomacher or bodice.

== Early stomachers ==
In the 15th and 16th centuries, men and women both wore decorative stomachers (sometimes called placards or plackets) with open-fronted doublets and gowns. Henchmen and footmen at the coronation of Henry VII of England in October 1485 were supplied with crimson and green satin doublets and "plakkardes". The form and style of these stomachers in combination with the headgear is often used to date paintings to a certain time period.

Stomachers for Elizabeth I were made by her tailors Walter Fyshe and William Jones. Some were rigid, made with paste board, while many had no stiffening. In the 1590s, the embroiderer John Parr embellished stomachers for Elizabeth with pearls and silver wire. In 1596, Parr embroiderered three gowns for ladies in waiting, and embellished the white satin and silver camlet stomachers with "a tuft of Venice stuff with hanging spangles and a garland of silver purl about them".

In 1603, Elizabeth Wriothesley, Countess of Southampton, who was pregnant, wrote to her husband in London asking him to buy her a stomacher, 'buy me a "stumiger" of scarlet, half a yard broad, and as long at least, lined with plush to keep my belly warm a days when I must ride'. In 1635, Henrietta Maria's tailors were paid for "putting in whalebone into all her Majesty's stomachers when her Majesty was with child".

In 1674, Lady Anne Clifford wrote that she usually wore a string of scented pomander beads under her stomacher.

Some 17th-century women's stomachers from the Dutch Republic:

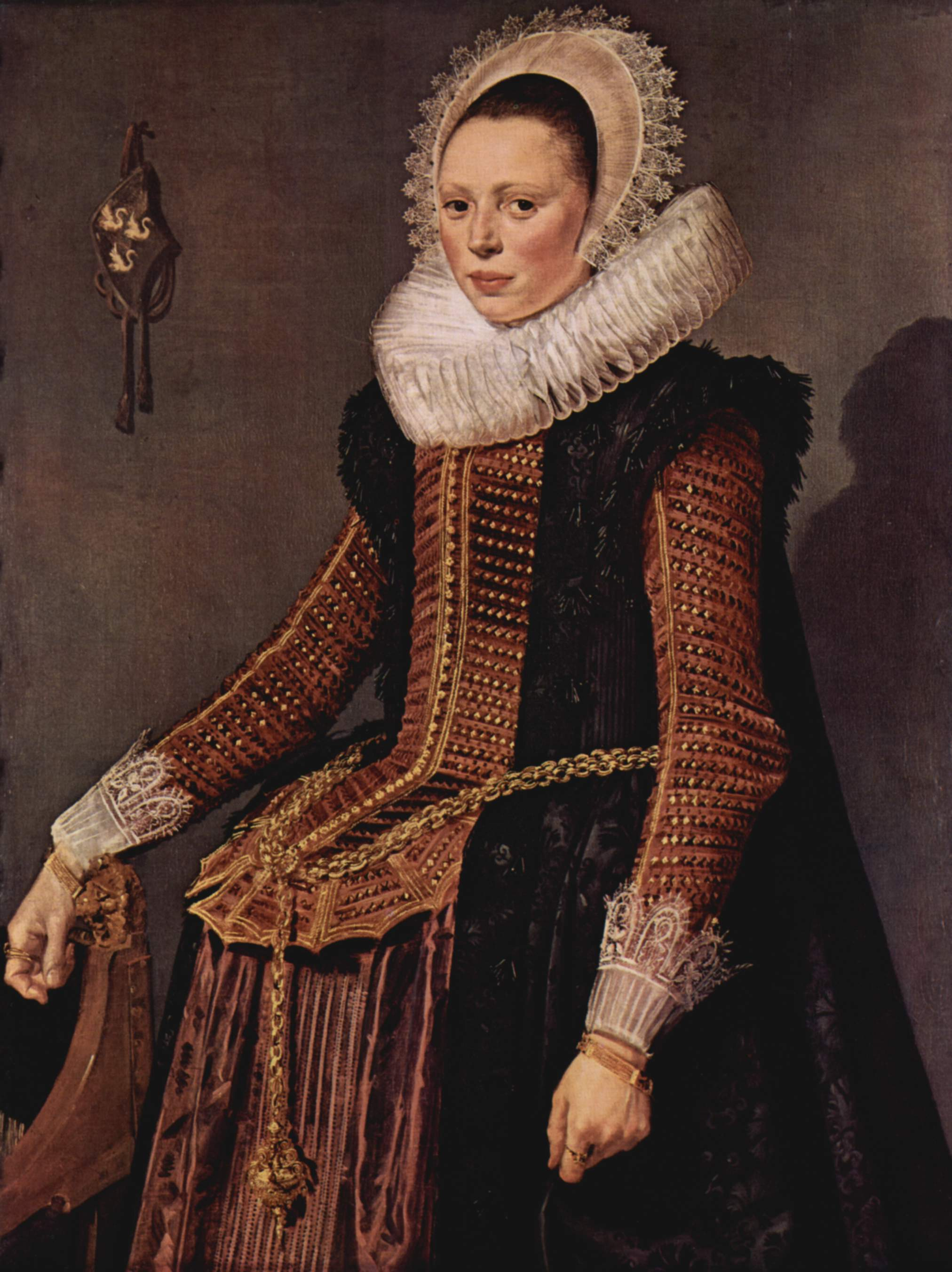
Stomacher c. 1620

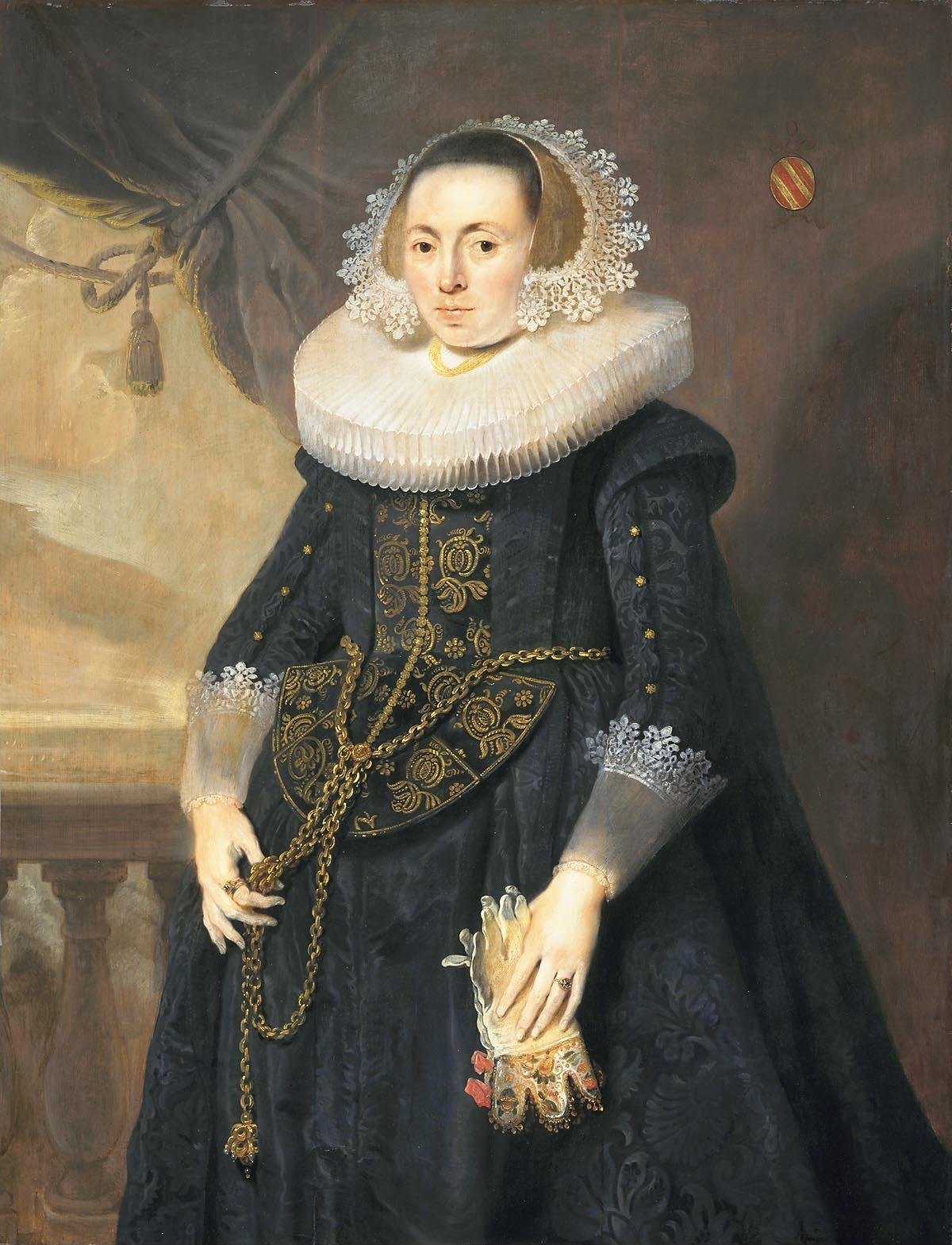
Stomacher c. 1630

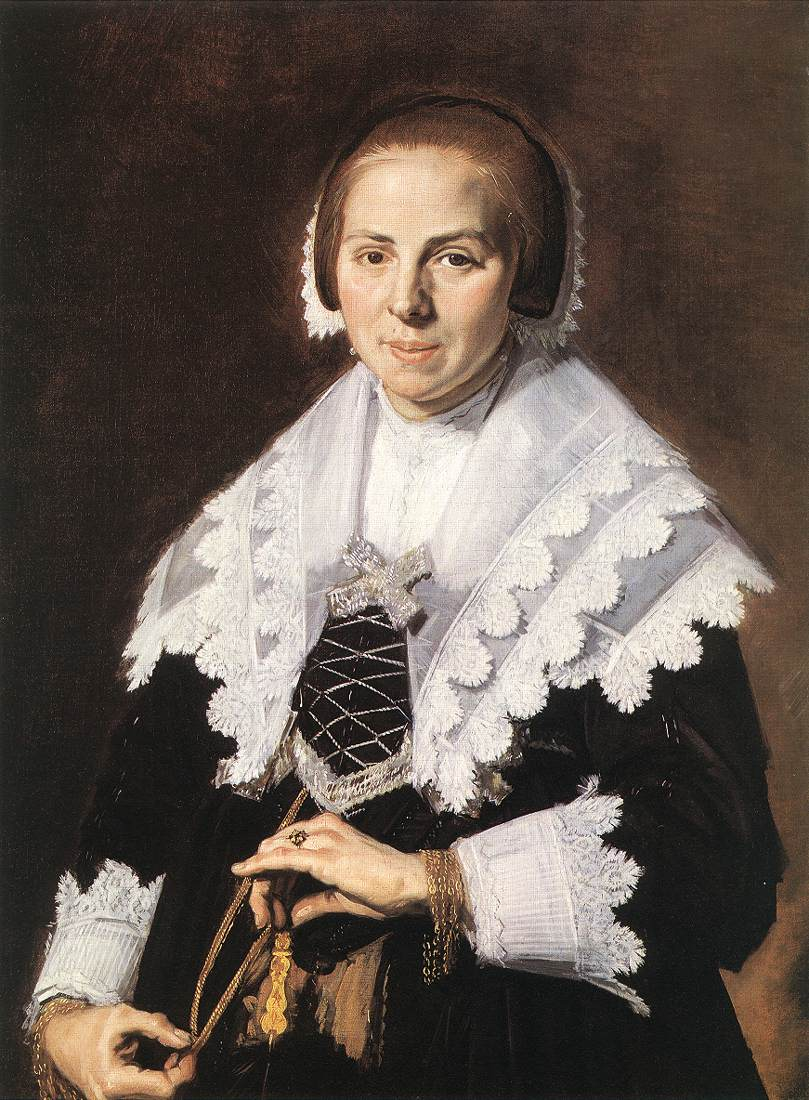
Stomacher c. 1640

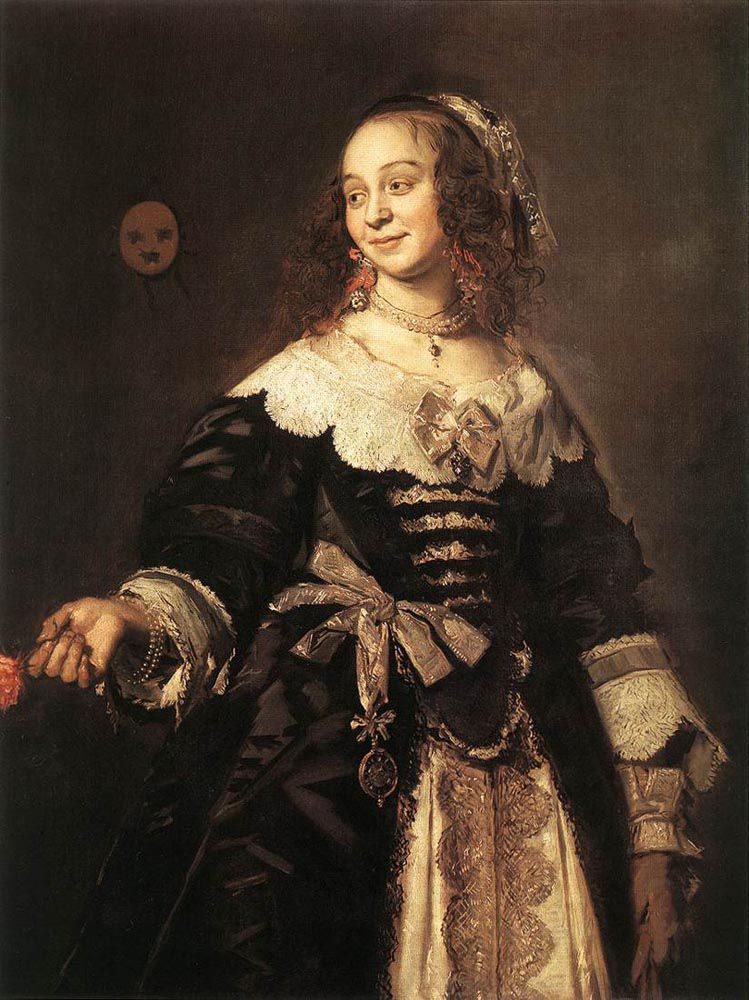
Stomacher c. 1650

== Later stomachers ==
Stomachers were in and out of fashion through the 17th and 18th centuries, varying in style and decoration, throughout Europe and North America.

From about 1740, most gowns and bodices were worn to reveal the stomacher, which covered the front of the torso from neckline to waist or even below the waist. The bodice's lacings would then criss-cross over the stomacher, and eventually the lacings became a series of decorative bows.

Stomachers were often embroidered, or covered in pearls and other jewels. They could be made of the same fabric as the dress or of a contrasting fabric. Depending on the period, their bottom point was at waist level, or lower; towards the end of the 18th Century they could be as deep as 10 inches below the waistline, making it impossible for the woman wearing them to sit.

Necklines also defined the length of a stomacher. There was a brief period during the court of Louis XVI, when the neckline and stomacher actually were below the breasts, which were covered by a transparent ruffle of fabric called a fichu.

== See also ==
- Fashion from 1500–1550, 1550–1600, 1600–1650, 1650–1700, 1700–1750, and 1750–1795
- Dudou, a Chinese undershirt sometimes known as a "stomacher"
