= Portrait of Alexandra of Denmark (Flameng) =

Painting by François Flameng

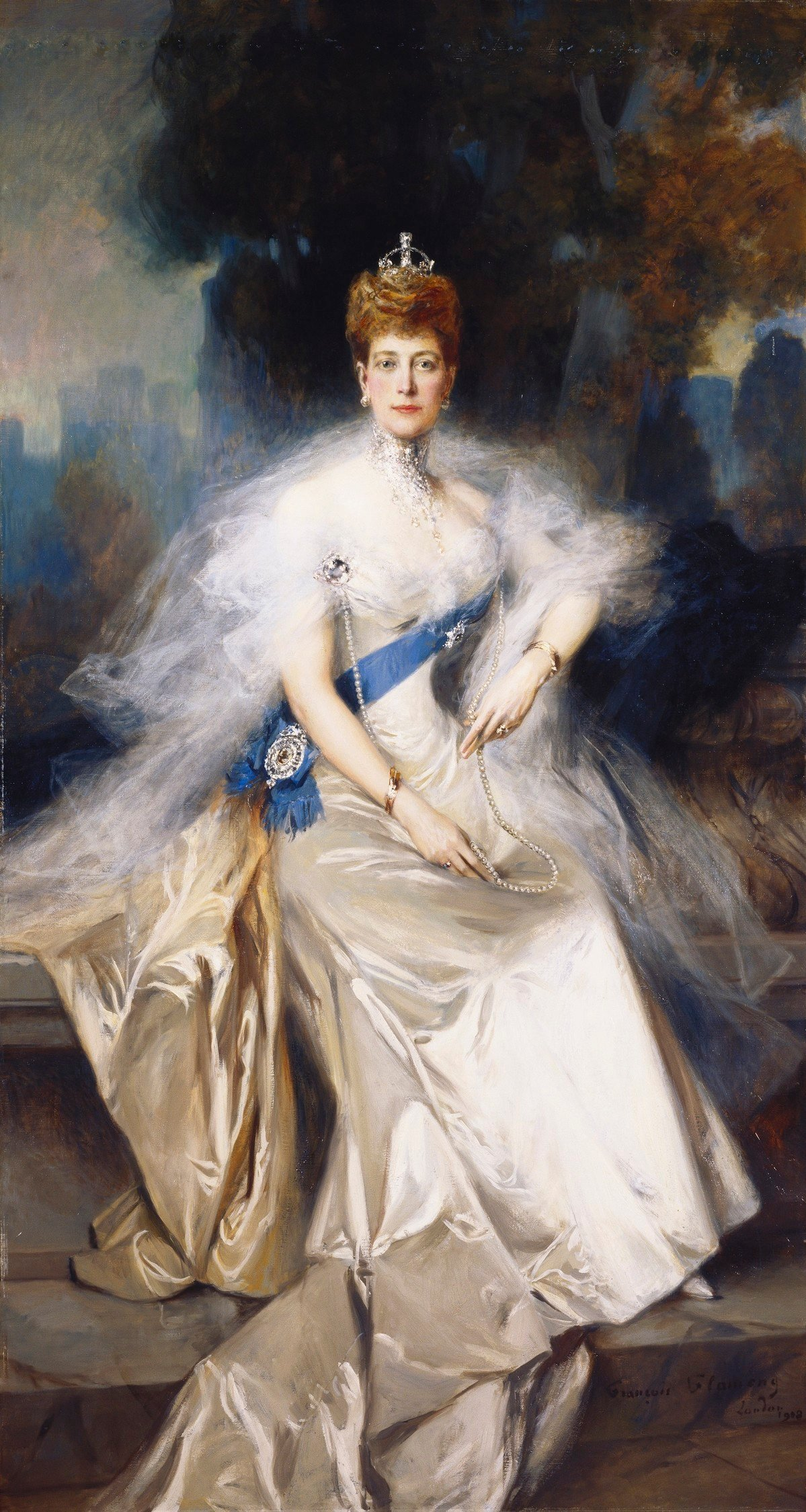
- Artist: François Flameng
- Year: 1908
- Type: Oil on canvas, portrait painting
- Dimensions: 254.0 cm × 132.1 cm (100.0 in × 52.0 in)
- Location: Buckingham Palace, London

Portrait of Alexandra of Denmark is a 1908 portrait painting by the French artist François Flameng. The portrait shows Alexandra of Denmark, when Queen of the United Kingdom, sitting on a stone step while wearing a white silk dress, the riband and star of the Order of the Garter, her Cartier necklace, the Small Diamond Crown of Queen Victoria, and the Koh-i-Noor as a brooch. Alexandra sat for the portrait in February 1908 and the artist's progress was inspected by her son and daughter-in-law, George, Prince of Wales, and Victoria Mary, Princess of Wales, during the couple's visit to Paris in April of the same year. The painting was then displayed at an exhibition of Flameng's works at Agnew's from June to July. Alexandra sat again for him in July at Buckingham Palace. The painting was first hung in the Crimson Drawing Room at Windsor Castle, but was moved to the White Drawing Room at Buckingham Palace in 1949, where it replaced the room's central mirror. It has also gone on display at the King's Gallery at the palace.
