= Stomacher (jewellery) =

Large brooch to be worn on the bodice of a dress

A stomacher – sometimes called a devant de corsage – is a piece of jewellery worn on the centre panel of the bodice of a dress, which is itself also called a stomacher. In the 18th and 19th century, stomachers became large, eye-catching pieces of jewellery to be worn with formal court robes or ball gowns. Like the tiara, it was a jewel pre-eminently suited to expressing social status.

== Description ==
A stomacher is worn on the centre panel of the bodice of a dress, which itself is also called stomacher.

A stomacher can consist of one or more elements. If it consists of one element, it can be best described as a large and elaborate brooch to be worn at the top of the bodice, in the centre of the neckline. A stomacher that consists of more than one element often has the overall shape of an inverted triangle: the element to be worn at the neckline is widest, with the lower elements tapering downwards towards the waist and covering the entire centre panel of the bodice. The elements can usually also be worn individually.

Ever since the Renaissance, the centre panels of bodices were adorned with precious stones and pearls that were sewn onto the fabric. The stomacher as a detachable piece of jewellery became popular in the second half of the 18th century, and was in fashion until the beginning of the 20th century. It was mainly worn with ball gowns or ceremonial gowns for events at court. Stomachers were made of gold, silver or platinum and richly decorated with precious stones and pearls. Because of its weight, a large stomacher could only be worn if the bodice of the gown was corsetted. In some countries, a similar, but simpler, piece of jewellery is part of the traditional folk costume.

A stomacher could be part of a parure, a set of jewellery with the same design. Stomachers went out of fashion at the beginning of the 20th century. Nowadays, an antique stomacher (or one of its elements) is occasionally worn as a brooch with an evening gown. It is then usually worn on the shoulder or on the belt, and not on the neckline.

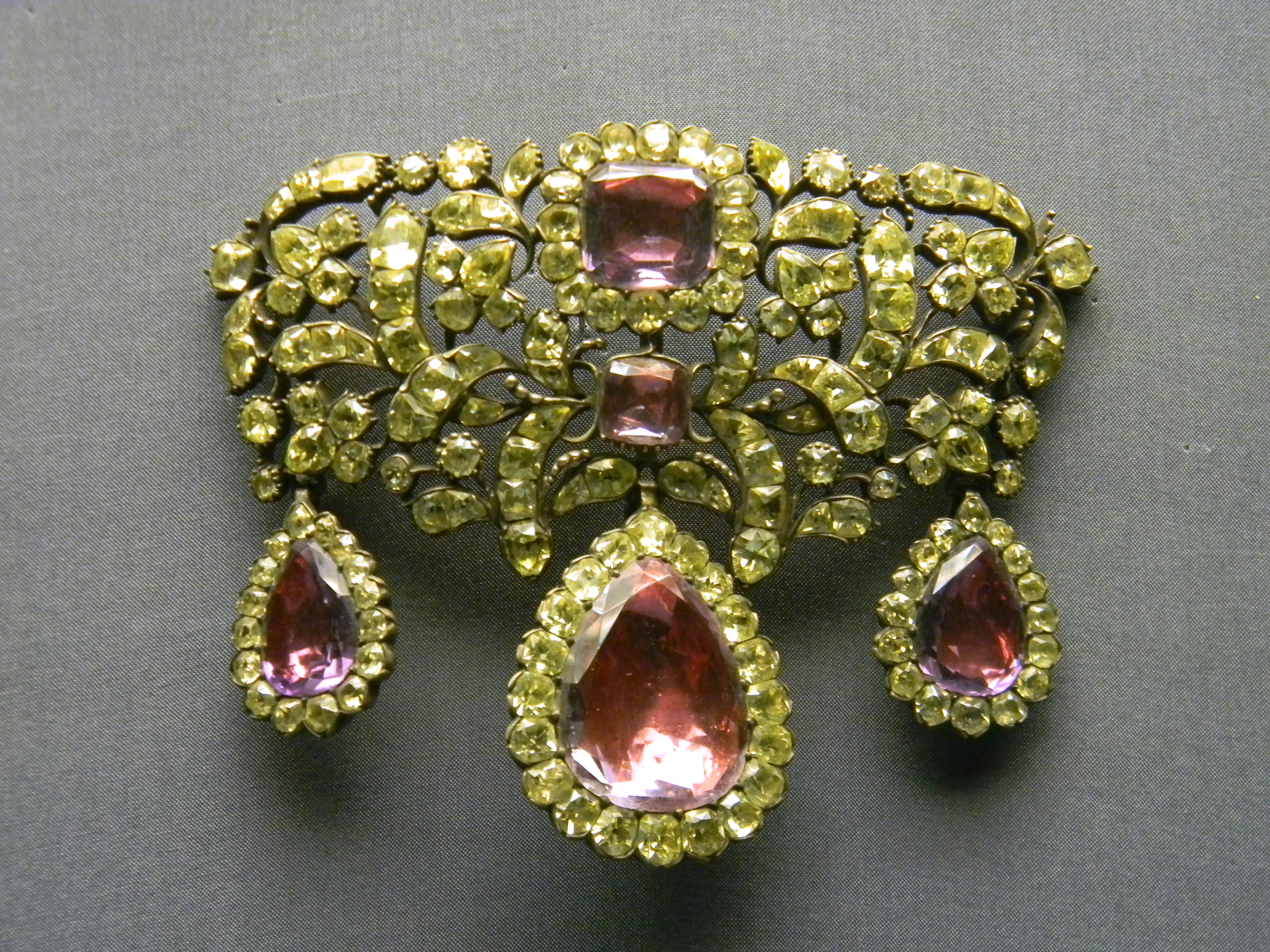
18th century stomacher made of chrysoberyls and amethysts,

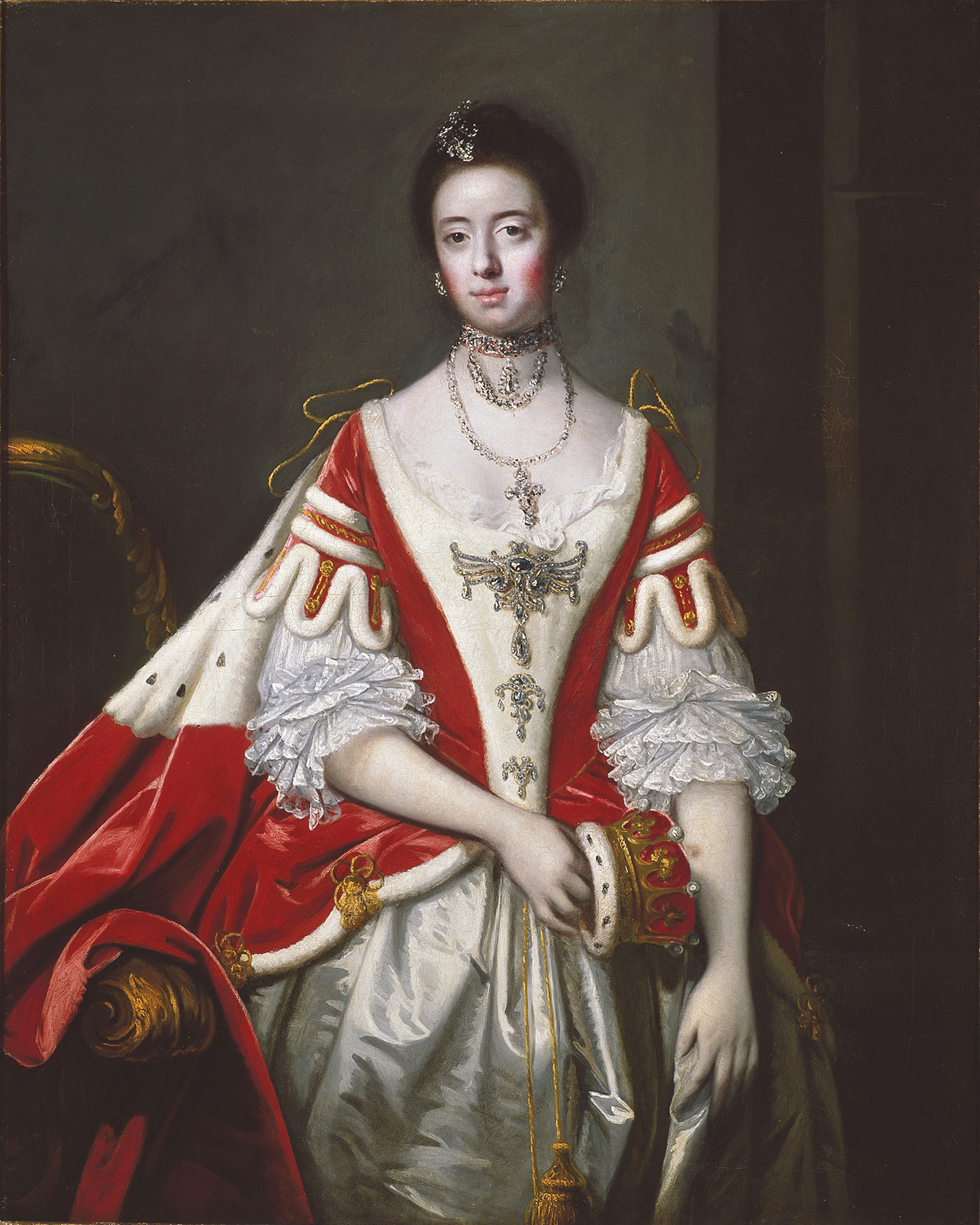
Countess of Dartmouth wearing a three-piece stomacher over ceremonial robes (Joshua Reynolds, 1757)

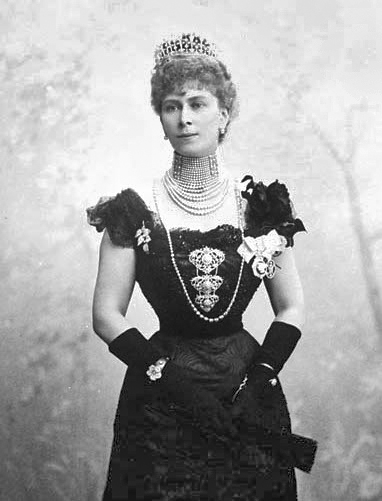
Princess (later queen) Mary wearing a three-piece stomacher (1901)

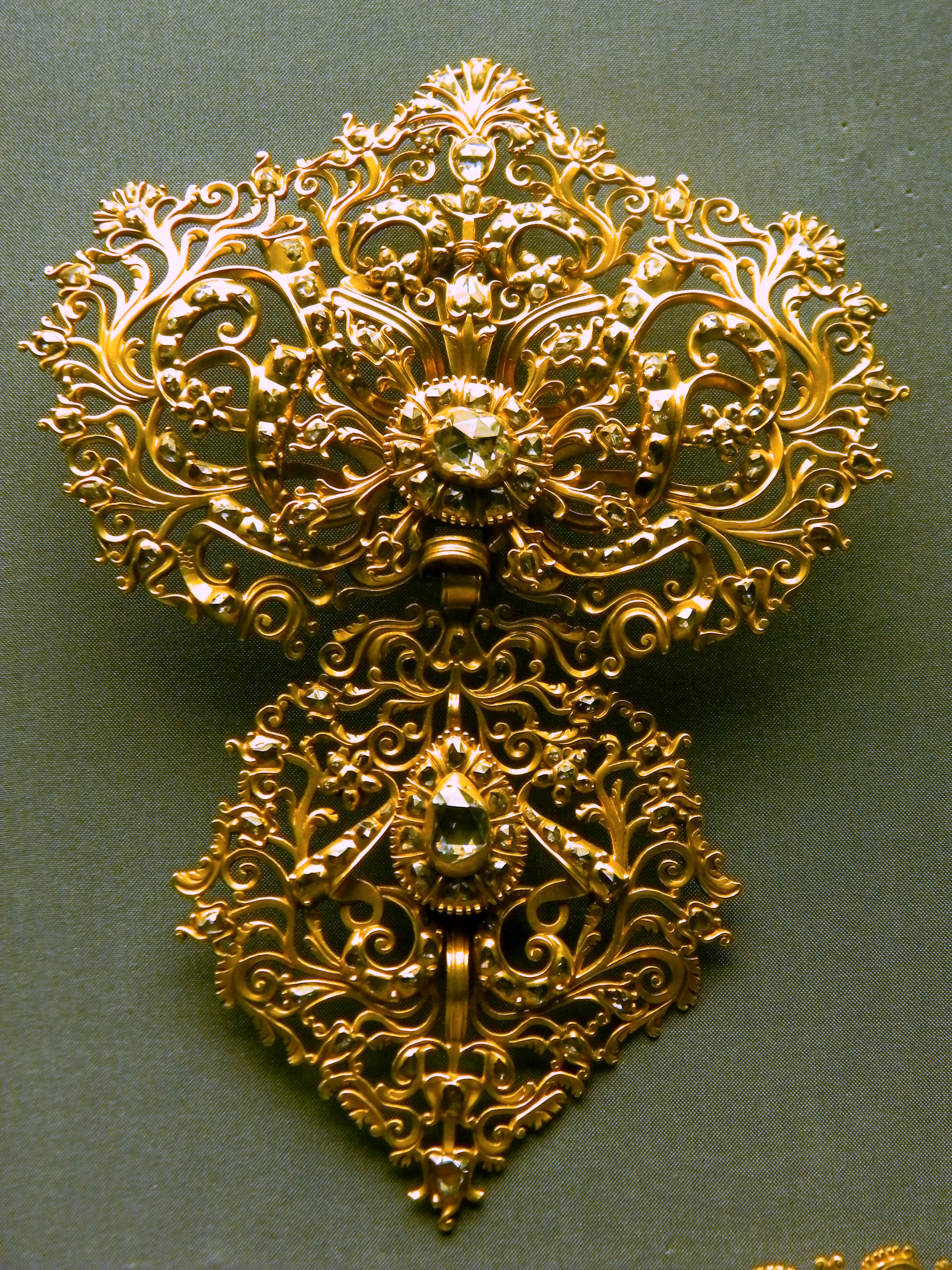
18th century stomacher made of gold and diamonds
