= Portrait of Alexandra of Denmark (Winterhalter) =

Painting by Franz Xaver Winterhalter

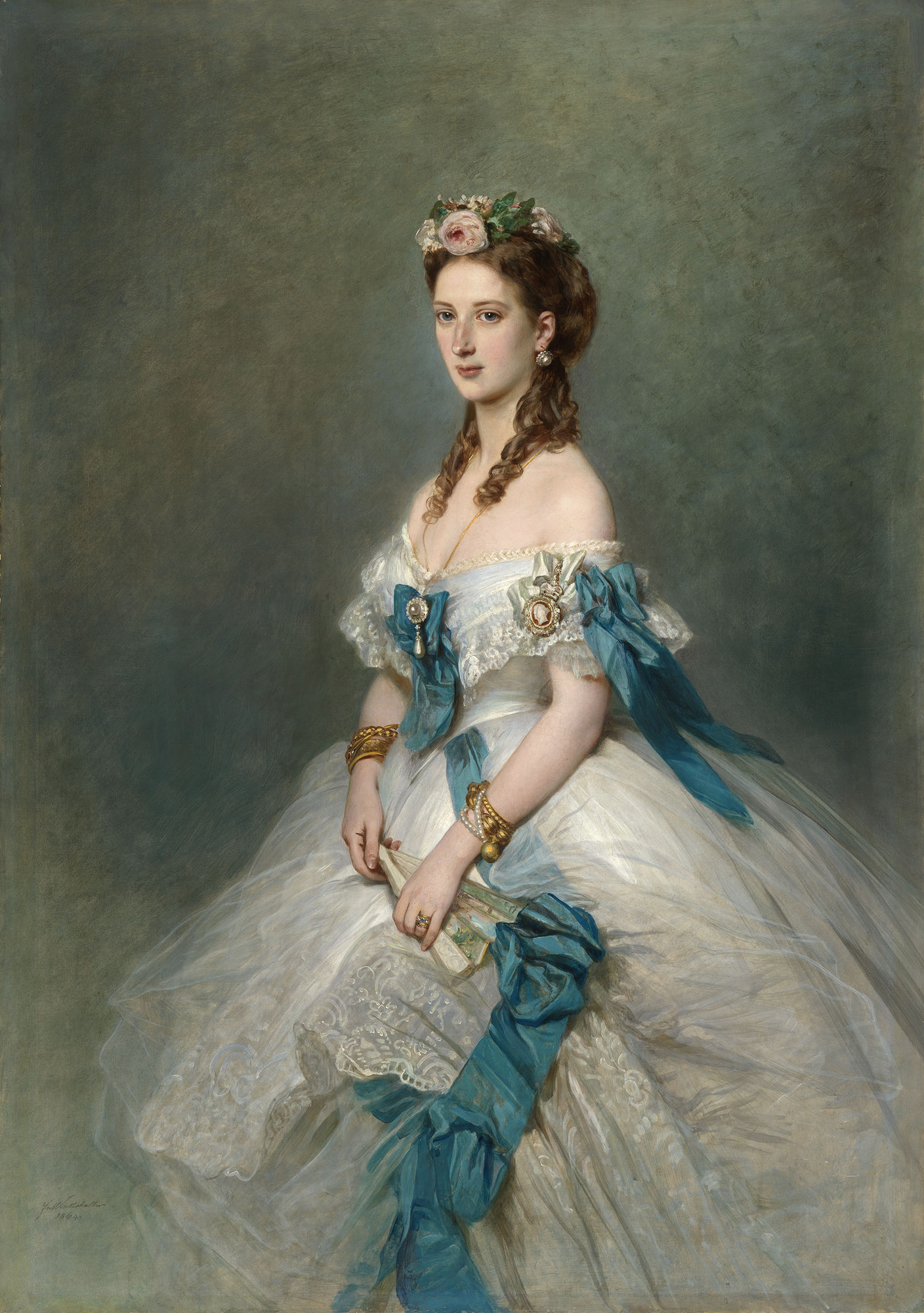
- Artist: Franz Xaver Winterhalter
- Year: 1864
- Type: Oil on canvas, portrait painting
- Dimensions: 162.6 cm × 114.1 cm (64.0 in × 44.9 in)
- Location: Royal Collection

Portrait of Alexandra of Denmark is an 1864 portrait painting by the German artist Franz Xaver Winterhalter. It depicts Alexandra of Denmark, then Princess of Wales as the wife of the future Edward VII. Alexandra had arrived in Britain from her native Denmark the previous year for her wedding. As a dynastic match it linked Alexandra, the daughter of Christian IX of Denmark with the son and heir of Queen Victoria.

It was commissioned by Queen Victoria and was hanging in the Crimson Drawing Room at Windsor Castle in 1878. It remains in the Royal Collection today.

== Bibliography ==
- De la Haye, Amy. The Rose in Fashion: Ravishing. Yale University Press, 2020. ISBN 0300250088.
- Eismann, Ingeborg. Franz Xaver Winterhalter (1805-1873): der Fürstenmaler Europas. Imhof, 2007. ISBN 3865682030.
- Müller, Frank Lorenz & Mehrkens, Heidi . Royal Heirs and the Uses of Soft Power in Nineteenth-Century Europe. Springer, 2016. ISBN 1137592087.
