= Portrait of Alexandra of Denmark (Fildes) =

Painting by Luke Fildes

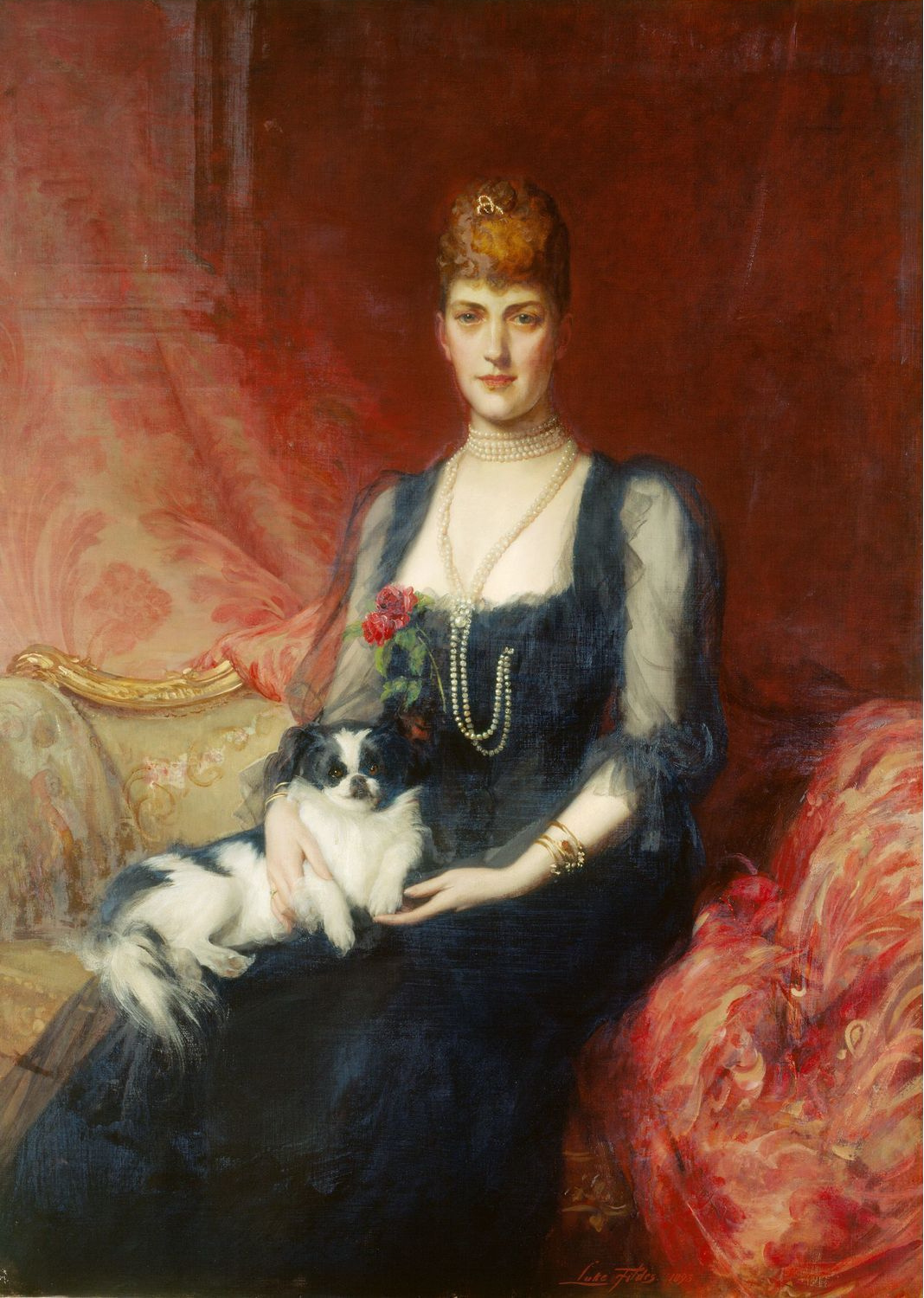
- Artist: Sir Luke Fildes
- Year: 1893-1894
- Medium: Oil on canvas
- Dimensions: 147.5 cm × 104.5 cm (58.1 in × 41.1 in)
- Location: Royal Collection

Portrait of Alexandra of Denmark is an oil on canvas portrait painting by the British artist Sir Luke Fildes, from 1893-1894.

== History and description ==
Over the course of his career, Fildes became a popular artist and by 1870 he had given up working for The Graphic and had turned his full attention to oil painting.

This portrait depicts Alexandra of Denmark, then Princess of Wales, with her dog Facey. It was commissioned by members of the Royal Household as a wedding gift to Alexandra's son, Prince George, Duke of York (later George V).

In 1920, another version of the portrait was presented to the National Portrait Gallery by George V, which depicts Alexandra with her Japanese Chin, called Punch. Fildes had later produced the coronation portraits of Edward VII and Alexandra.

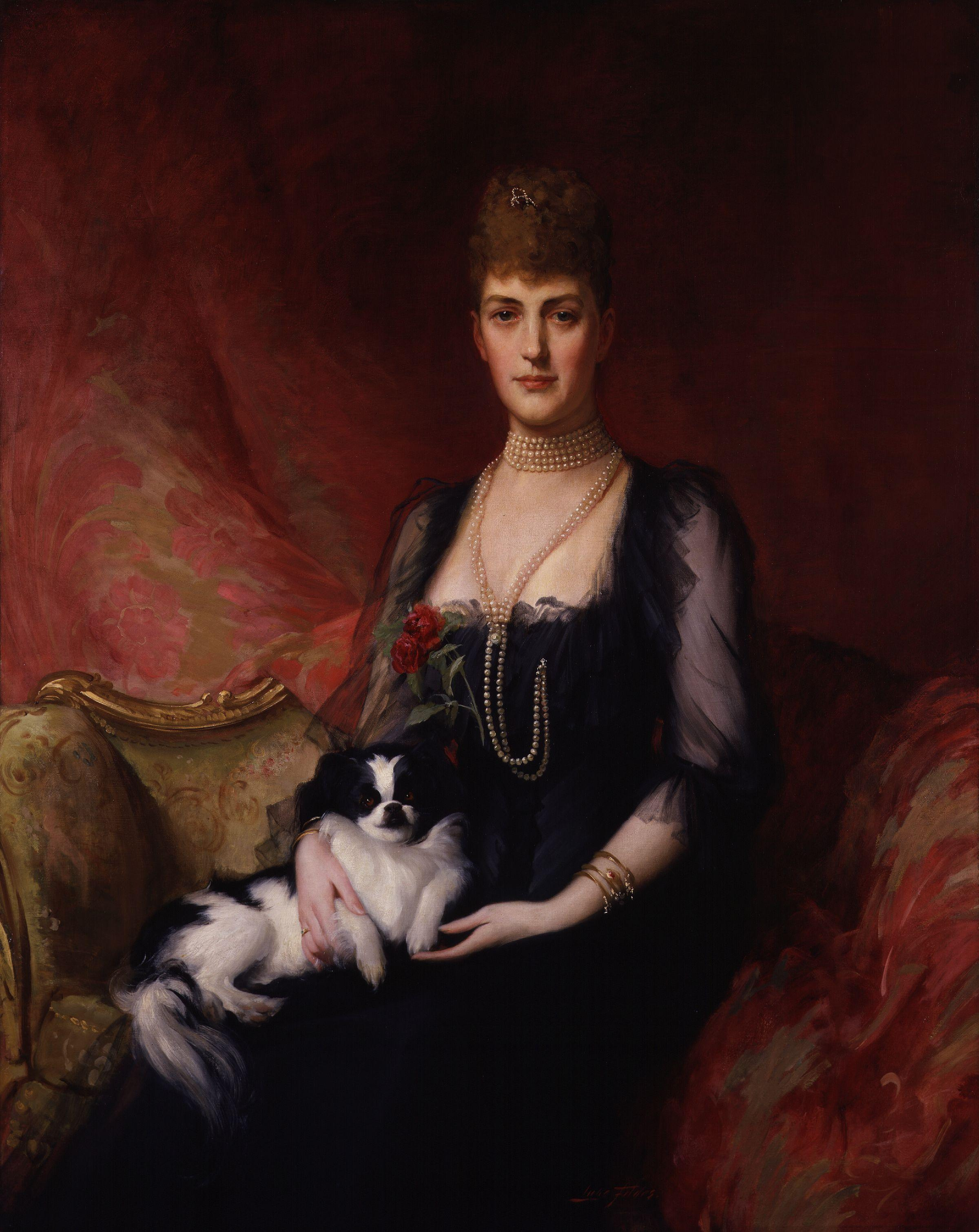
Version in the National Portrait Gallery, London
