= Bal Costumé of 1851 =

Ball held by Queen Victoria and Prince Albert

Coordinates: 51.500833°N 0.143048°W

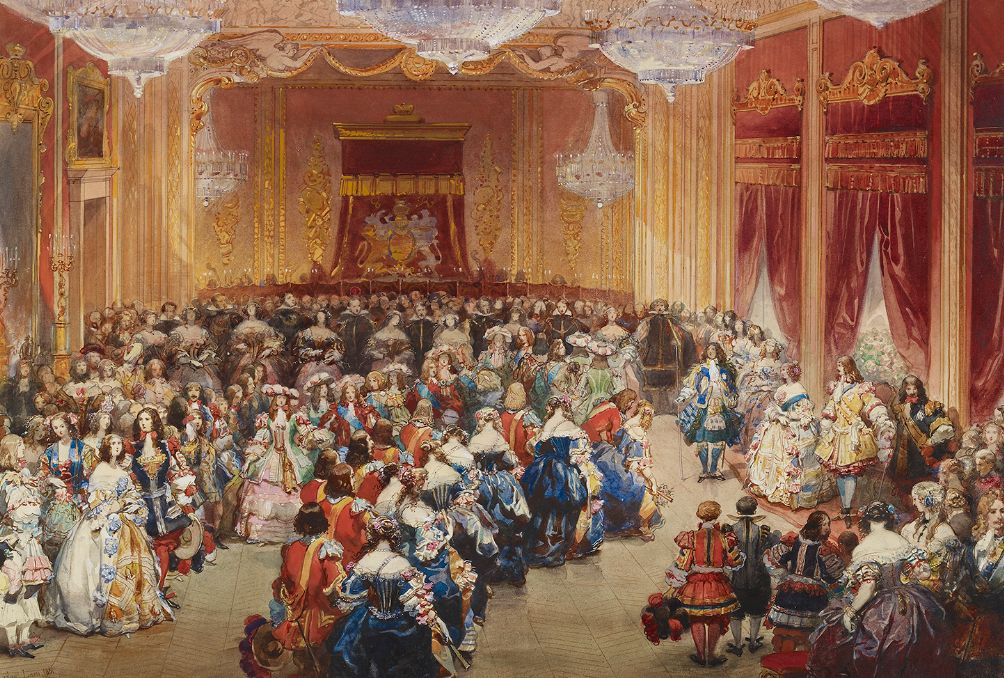
1851 watercolour by Eugène Lami depicting the ballroom of Buckingham Palace during the Stuart Ball

The Bal Costumé of 1851 or the Stuart Ball was a fancy dress ball held by Queen Victoria and Prince Albert in Buckingham Palace. It was the last of three widely publicised "Bal Costumé" held by Queen Victoria in the mid-19th century, with the others occurring in 1842 and 1845.

== Event ==
The ball was held on 13 June 1851 in Buckingham Palace. It was known as the Stuart Ball as it was themed around the English court dress of the restoration. It has been considered possibly the most prescriptive of the three balls in terms of costume.

=== Costumes ===
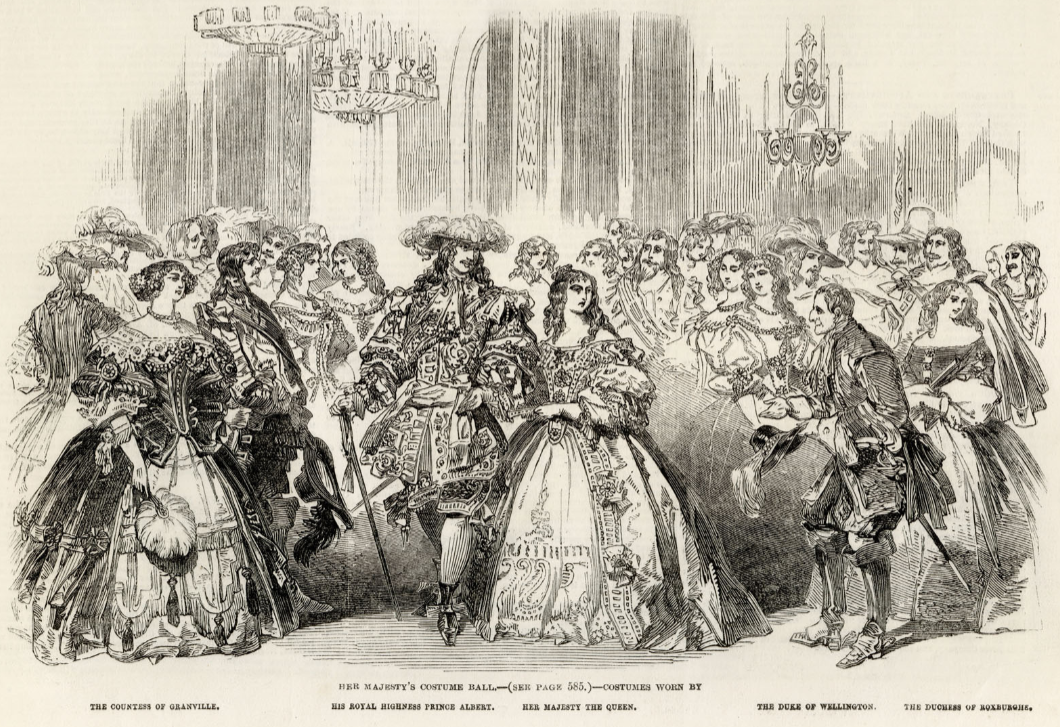
The Ball depicted in The Illustrated London News, Victoria and Albert are shown in the centre

Victoria dress was of the robe de cour fashion, and is considered the most glamorous of her surviving collection. Unlike the first two balls, the Stuart Ball did not have the express goal of boosting the silk industry of Spitalfieds. Her dress therefore included fabric Banaras brocade woven in Varanasi, and possibly none of its materials were woven in Britain. The ball took place two weeks after the opening of the Great Exhibition and as such the choice of dress served to symbolise Victoria's role beyond Britain, as themes of Empire had been on display in the exhibition.

As was common among high-profile events of the Victorian royal court, many of the guests were members of high society and the aristocracy. The Duke of Wellington was present dressed as a restoration era field marshal. Foreign guests were encouraged to wear the dress of their respective countries, with the American ambassador dressed as John Winthrop who had led the Massachusetts Bay Colony.

The antiquarian James Planché, who had published his book, the History of British Dress in 1830, was a costume maker, and he was thus frequently consulted by guests aiming to have historically accurate costumes.

== See also ==
- Devonshire House Ball of 1897
- Costume party
- Bal Costumé of 1842
- Bal Costumé of 1845
- Shakespeare Memorial National Theatre Ball
