= Bal Costumé of 1845 =

Ball held by Queen Victoria and Prince Albert

Coordinates: 51.500833°N 0.143048°W

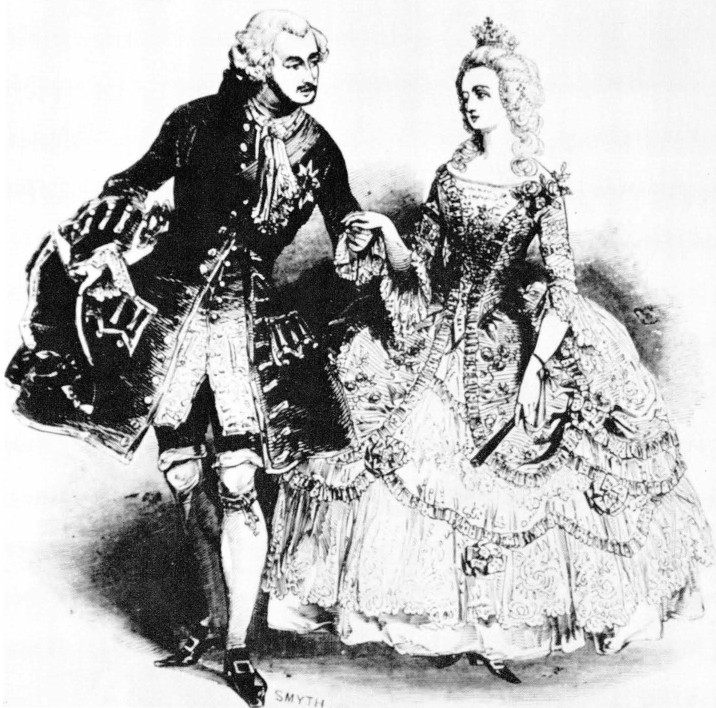
Victoria and Albert in fancy dress as depicted in the Illustrated London News

The Bal Costumé of 1845 or the Bal Poudré (powdered ball) was a fancy dress ball held by Queen Victoria and Prince Albert in Buckingham Palace. It was the second of three widely publicised "Bal Costumé" held by Queen Victoria in the mid-19th century, with the others occurring in 1842 and 1851.

== Event ==
Queen Victoria in Fancy Dress by Edwin Landseer depicts Victoria in the dress she would wear to the ball, sitting for the portrait two days before

The ball was held on 7 June 1845 in Buckingham Palace. It was themed on European courts Georgian period. The guests included members of the aristocracy and would number 1,200 in total.

=== Theme ===
The theme of the ball was the Georgian period, in particular the 1740s and 1750s, and guests invited were instructed to wear costumes reflecting the period. Among them were members of the court and aristocracy as well as foreign royals and diplomats who were instructed to wear the courtly dress of their respective countries at that time. Unlike the Bal Costumé of 1842, Victoria and Albert did not dress as any historic figure in particular but wore generic courtly dress of the period, Victoria commissioned clothiers Vouillon and Laure of Hanover Square to provide her cloth and gold brocade gown for the event. With many of the guests adorned in powdered faces and powdered wigs, which had been popular in the Georgian court, the event would be given secondary name of Bal Poudré or "powdered ball".

James Planché, an antiquarian interested in fashion history had published the History of British Dress in 1830. As a costume designer he was frequently consulted by guests of the Bal Costumés aiming for historical accuracy in their dress. Similarly to the first Bal Costumé three years earlier, it was hoped that the ball would boost the silk industry of Spitalfieds.

== See also ==
- Devonshire House Ball of 1897
- Costume party
- Bal Costumé of 1842
- Bal Costumé of 1851
- Shakespeare Memorial National Theatre Ball
