= Bal Costumé of 1842 =

Ball held by Queen Victoria and Prince Albert

Coordinates: 51.500833°N 0.143048°W

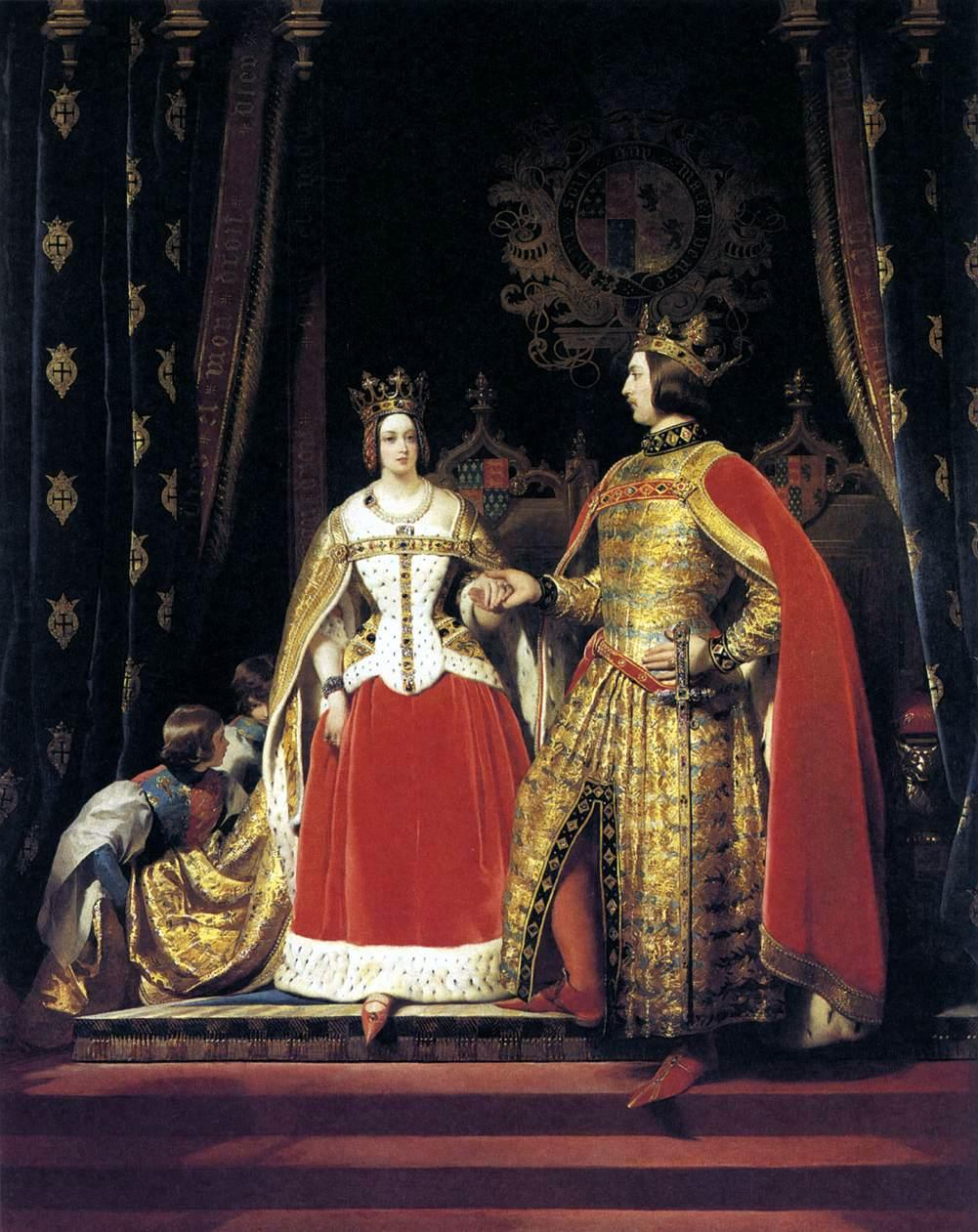
Queen Victoria and Prince Albert at the Bal Costumé by Edwin Landseer depicting Queen Victoria and Prince Albert in their costumes. Albert is dressed as King Edward III and Victoria as Queen Philippa of Hainault

The Bal Costumé of 1842 was a fancy dress ball held by Queen Victoria and Prince Albert in Buckingham Palace. It was the first of three widely publicised "Bal Costumé" held by Queen Victoria in the mid-19th century, with the others occurring in 1845 and 1851.

== Event ==
The ball was held on 12 May 1842 in Buckingham Palace. It was themed on European courts of the late medieval period with courtly dress and suits of armour in reference to the time popular.

At the beginning of the event Victoria and Albert were met by processions in the decorated throne room before heading to the ballroom. As was standard, the ball involved dancing, mostly in Quadrilles, as well as supper and lasted into the early hours of the next day. The ball also featured, as was common, a souvenir with illustrations of guests and their costumes. The guests included members of the aristocracy as well as Great Officers of State in various groups and would number 2,000.

=== Theme ===
The theme of the ball was the Plantagenet period of the Middle Ages and guests were expected to wear historically accurate dress for the time period. Queen Victoria and Prince Albert were themselves dressed as Philippa of Hainault and Edward III, their costumes based on their tomb effigies in Westminster Abbey. The bodice of Victoria's dress would include jewellery worth £60,000. The historical accuracy was not absolute, and fashion sensibilities of the time informed the dress worn. For example, Prince Albert is depicted in a contemporary painting by Edwin Landseer with the Sword of Offering which was made by Rundells for the Coronation of George IV. Victoria's costume also adhered to more contemporary codes, with the fashionable silhouette of the time being retained.

The 18th century had seen a revival of interest in the medieval period which would carry on into the 19th. The antiquarian James Planché, who had published his book, the History of British Dress in 1830, was frequently consulted by guests aiming to wear historically accurate costumes. The ball's fancy dress theme also helped in Victoria's goal of helping the silk industry of Spitalfieds.

=== Cultural Impact ===
The ball was part of the broader revivalist movements in the arts, and would play a part in popularising the use of fancy dress in gatherings, largely distinct from the masquerade balls that had been popular in the British royal court previously. Many of the costumes had been put on display in shop windows by their makers in the days leading up to the ball such as Vouillon & Laure in Hanover Square, visible to the public and members of high society who had passed by. The ball also inspired the plot-point in the TV series Victoria where a ball is held for the benefit of the silk industry.

== See also ==
- Devonshire House Ball of 1897
- Costume party
- Bal Costumé of 1845
- Bal Costumé of 1851
- Shakespeare Memorial National Theatre Ball
