= The Stuart Ball at Buckingham Palace =

Painting by Eugène Lami

The Stuart Ball of 1851
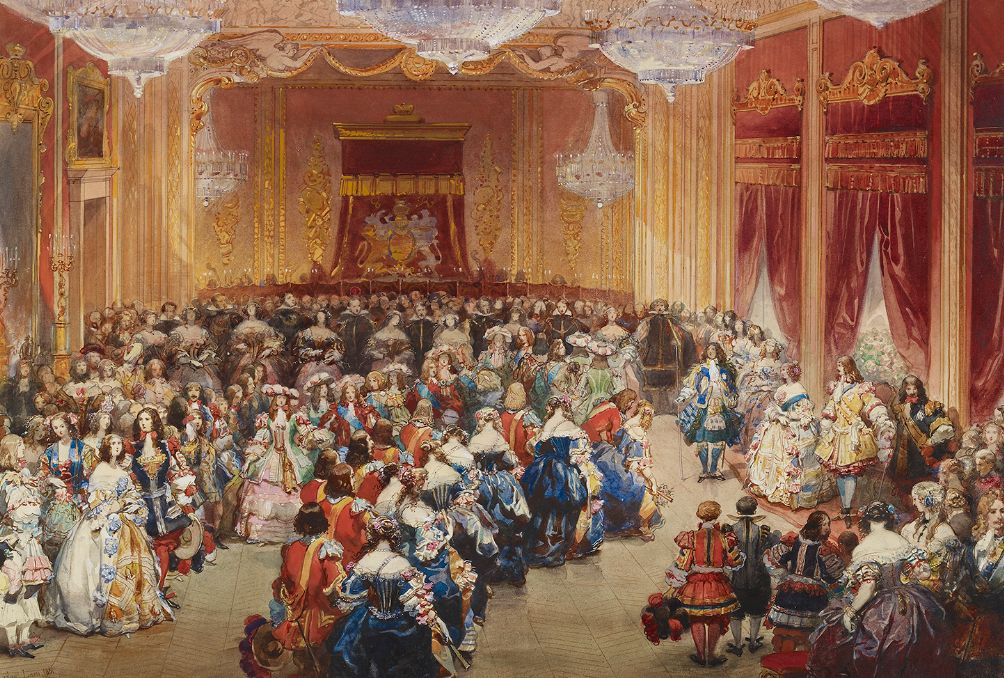
- Artist: Eugène Lami
- Year: 1851
- Medium: Watercolour
- Dimensions: 30.6 cm × 45.2 cm (12.0 in × 17.8 in)
- Location: London, England

The Stuart Ball at Buckingham Palace is an 1851 painting by French painter Eugène Lami.

== History and description ==
The painting depicts the Bal Costumé of 1851 or the "Stuart Ball". The event was the last of three widely publicised fancy dress balls held by Queen Victoria and Prince Albert in the mid 19th-century, themed around the Stuart restoration. As the new Ballroom of Buckingham Palace was not opened until 1856, the event instead took place within the Throne Room. Victoria and Albert are depicted on the right of the painting, with quadrilles of dancers representing and dressed in the styles of England, Spain, France and Germany approaching to make obeisance.

Lami was commissioned to make the piece by Queen Victoria for her View Albums. He was also involved in the designs of a number of costumes worn by the guests.

== See also ==
- Queen Victoria and Prince Albert at the Bal Costumé
- Queen Victoria in Fancy Dress
