= Queen Victoria in Fancy Dress =

Painting by Edwin Landseer

- Artist: Edwin Landseer
- Year: 1845
- Medium: Oil on panel
- Dimensions: 43.2 cm × 31.8 cm (17.0 in × 12.5 in)
- Location: London, England

Queen Victoria in Fancy Dress is an 1845 painting by English painter Edwin Landseer.

== History and description ==
The painting is a portrait of Queen Victoria in fancy dress as worn to the Bal Costumé of 1845, one of three widely publicised fancy dress balls held by Victoria and Prince Albert in Buckingham Palace in the mid 19th-century. The theme of the ball was the Georgian Period and as such Victoria had requested for Vouillon & Laure, clothiers of Hanover Square, to produce a 1740s dress for her to wear. She sat for the portrait two days before the event. The painting is currently held by the Royal Collection, and was exhibited in the Royal Academy's "Landseer Exhibition" in 1874.

== See also ==
- Queen Victoria and Prince Albert at the Bal Costumé
- The Stuart Ball at Buckingham Palace
