= Maradan Carson =

Etiénne Marie Carson, known under her professional name Madame Maradan Carson (1788–1843), was a French-born British milliner and dressmaker. She was the co-owner of the Fashion House Maradan Carson & Co. and a leading dressmaker of London in the 1820s and 1830s.

== Life and career ==
She was born in Paris to the tailor Jean François Carson and the milliner Hyacinthe Maurer, and an educated dressmaker. She married Jean Pierre Maradan, and took "Maradan Carson" as her professional name as a dressmaker.

She was assisted by her father and the silk merchant François Vouillon to establish a business in London. By 1822, she was the co-owner and boss of the Maradan Carson & Co. fashion house on 9 Princes Street, Hanover Square in London's West End (from 1826 on number 12).

She became a fashionable dressmaker for the upper class. In 1828 she created the Elizabethan costumes for the hostess and several of the female guests at the famous Elizabethan costume ball hosted by Frances Anne, Marchioness of Londonderry at Holderness House; the costumes were depicted in La Belle Assemblée, which became a huge success for Maradan Carson. In The Court Magazine, Madame Maradan Carson was described ‘as great as Diana of Ephesians’, and wrote that ‘no Lady, who wished to be thought anybody, could be seen by civilised people" unless dressed by Madame Maradan Carson. In 1832-1833, she contributed as a fashion journalist for The Court Magazine.

In 1832 Carson retired as a wealthy woman and returned to Paris. She ended her collaboration with François Vouillon, who formed a new companionship with Laure Vouillon, and transformed Maradan Carson & Co. to become Vouillon & Laure.
