= Shakespeare Tercentenary of 1916 =

Celebrations of Shakespeare's works

The Shakespeare Tercentenary of 1916 was a widespread set of commemorations of the life and works of William Shakespeare held on the tercentenary of his death. A number of celebrations were held across the British Empire, throughout the Anglophone world, and beyond.

== Background ==
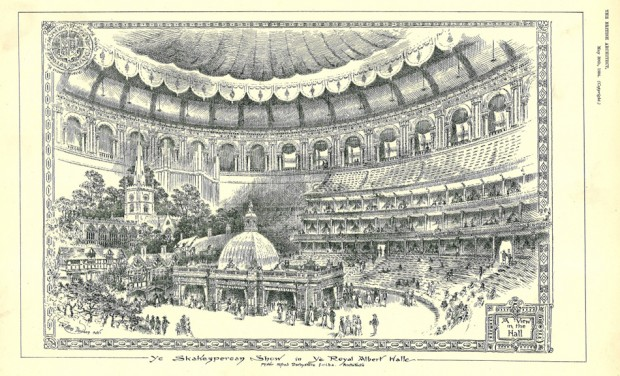
A postcard of the 1911 Shakespeare Memorial National Theatre Ball

Leading up to the tercentenary, plans were made for the observance of the tercentenary of Shakespeare's death. Campaigns for a National Memorial Theatre for Shakespeare had been raised beginning in 1904 and became more concrete with the creation of the Shakespeare Memorial National Theatre General Committee in 1908.

The Shakespeare Memorial National Theatre Ball was held in 1911 with the intention of raising funds for the proposed theatre. Taking place just two days before the Coronation of George V, the ball had the advantage of attracting a number of notable guests from around the country as well as around the world who were in London for attendance of the coronation. Despite this and the displays of wealth in the setting and clothes and jewellery worn by many of the guests, the event raised much less than was expected. As with many of the intended commemorations, hopes of finding funding leading up to 1916 were stifled by the First World War.

In 1914, the British Academy announced its intention of commemorating Shakespeare, eventually formulating the goal "that the Tercentenary of the death of Shakespeare should be commemorated in a manner worthy of the veneration in which the memory of Shakespeare is held by the English-speaking peoples and by the world at large". A letter of invitation for support attracted the interest from actors and academics including Ellen Terry and George Bernard Shaw. The war would similarly be an obstacle for such observances.

== Commemorations ==
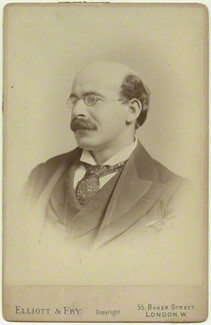
Israel Gollancz who produced A Book of Homage to Shakespeare in 1916

The commemorations were heavily constrained by the First World War. The British Academy's intended celebrations had been curbed. The efforts produced a lecture given by John William Mackail covering the subject as part of the Shakespeare Lecture series which had begun in 1911, and A Book of Homage to Shakespeare by Israel Gollancz. The latter was a champion of the campaign to produce a memorial for Shakespeare. A number of performances of Shakespeare's plays were also widely held to celebrate the occasion.

=== Cultural Impact ===
At the very least, then, the event produced heightened interest in Shakespeare and inspired an increased volume of literature on his works. Various libraries in England put on exhibitions about the tercentenary, and the New York Public Library, at a distance from the war, was able to host a larger event.

The event, and cultural connection to Shakespeare more broadly, came to be used as a point of national and cultural identity during the tercentenary, with these associations heightened by the ongoing war. It was argued in Germany that Shakespeare's works had been significantly "naturalised", a belief that had existed for some decades before but was especially alleged at the time. This claim was not entirely dismissed as propaganda by critics in Britain, with George Bernard Shaw lamenting the apathy towards the intended creation of a national memorial theatre suggesting it might be better to leave commemoration of the bard to Berlin.

Conversely, in Britain, the collective heritage of Shakespeare was used as a way to encourage closer ties within the Empire, particularly among the Dominions. Gollancz's A Book of Homage to Shakespeare included tributes from Britain's allies, colonies and neutral nations. In it, Sol Plaatje, a black South African living in London, invoked Shakespeare to petition the British government to intervene in racist legislation that had been passed in South Africa by the Union government.

== See also ==
- Shakespeare Jubilee
- Shakespeare Memorial National Theatre Ball

== Bibliography ==
- Smialkowska, Monika. Shakespeare’s Tercentenary : Staging Nations and Performing Identities in 1916 / Monika Smialkowska. Cambridge University Press, 2024. https://doi.org/10.1017/9781009280839.
