= Queen Victoria and Prince Albert at the Bal Costumé =

Painting by Edwin Landseer

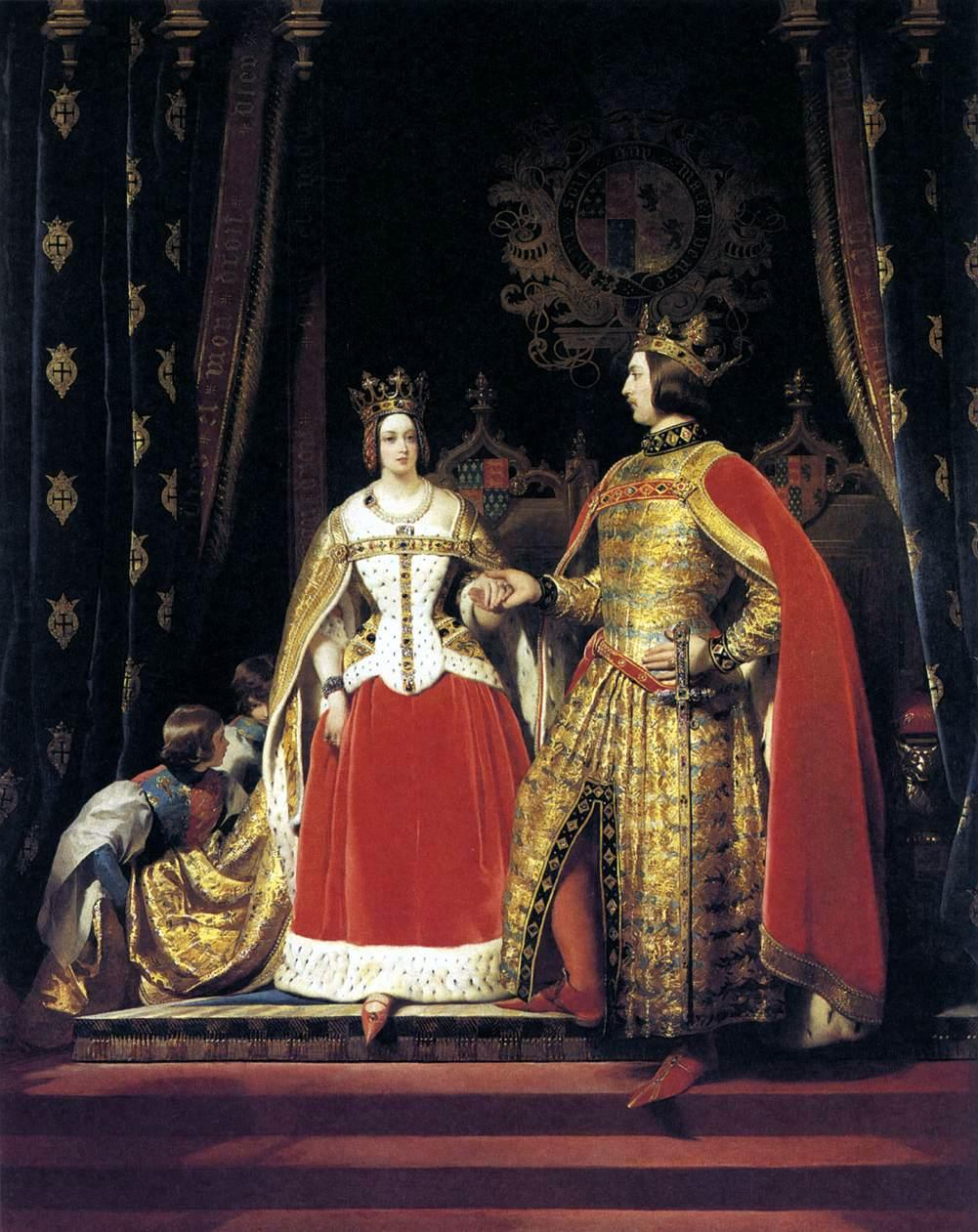
- Artist: Edwin Landseer
- Year: 1846
- Medium: Oil on canvas
- Dimensions: 143 cm × 112 cm (56 in × 44 in)
- Location: London, England

Queen Victoria and Prince Albert at the Bal Costumé is an 1846 painting by English painter Edwin Landseer.

== History and description ==
The painting is a double portrait of Queen Victoria and Prince Albert, depicting the couple at the Bal Costumé of 1842. The event was the first of three widely publicised fancy dress balls held by Victoria and Albert in Buckingham Palace in the mid 19th-century, all themed on periods of the past. The 1842 ball was themed on the medieval era, Albert's costume based on Edward III and Victoria on his wife Philippa of Hainult. Despite the historic theme, elements of Victorian fashion are maintained in Victoria's dress. Edwin Landseer was commissioned by Queen Victoria to produce the painting to commemorate the event.

== See also ==
- The Stuart Ball at Buckingham Palace
- Queen Victoria in Fancy Dress
