= Madame Laure =

Marie Laure Vouillon, known under her professional name Madame Laure (1813–1894), was a French-born British milliner and dressmaker. She was the Milliner in Ordinary to Queen Victoria in 1837–1856, and the marchande de mode to Queen Louise of Belgium in 1845.

== Life and career ==
Laure Vouillon was born to a clothes dealer in Central France. She was the sister of the silk mercer François Vouillon, who was the business partner of Madame Maradan Carson and part owner of the Maradan Carson & Co. fashion house on 12 Princes Street, Hanover Square in London's West End. When Madame Maradan Carson, a top name in British fashion, retired in the mid 1830s and returned to Paris, François Vouillon became the sole owner of Maradan Carson & Co. fashion house. Since he had always only been the financial partner of Carson while she had the craft expertise, he invited his sister Laure Vouillon, who was a dressmaker, to come to London to manage the actual business.

Laure Vouillon took the professional name Madame Laure and the Maradan Carson & Co. fashion house was rebranded as Vouillon & Laure. She became a success in London, and was appointed Milliner in Ordinary to Queen Victoria in 1837. The following year, she was mentioned at the dinner table of queen Victoria in conversation with the Prime minister, and referred to as the women's fashion top name of the time. In 1841, her fashion house employed twenty dressmaker, nine milliners and a florist. She made the queen's costume to the royal masquerade balls of 1842 and 1845. She was not only active in Britain. In 1845, she was appointed to marchande de mode to the queen of Belgium.

In 1851, François Vouillon made bancrupty, and in 1853 he sold the Vouillon & Laure fashion house to William Priest States and Juliette States. Laure Vouillon retired and settled in Belgium with her Belgian husband, the language professor Albert Voss. The Milliner in Ordinary to Queen Victoria in 1856-1876 was Sarah Ann Unitt, who was the former student and employee of Laure Vouillon.
