= Robe de cour =

Women's fashion of 18th-century Europe

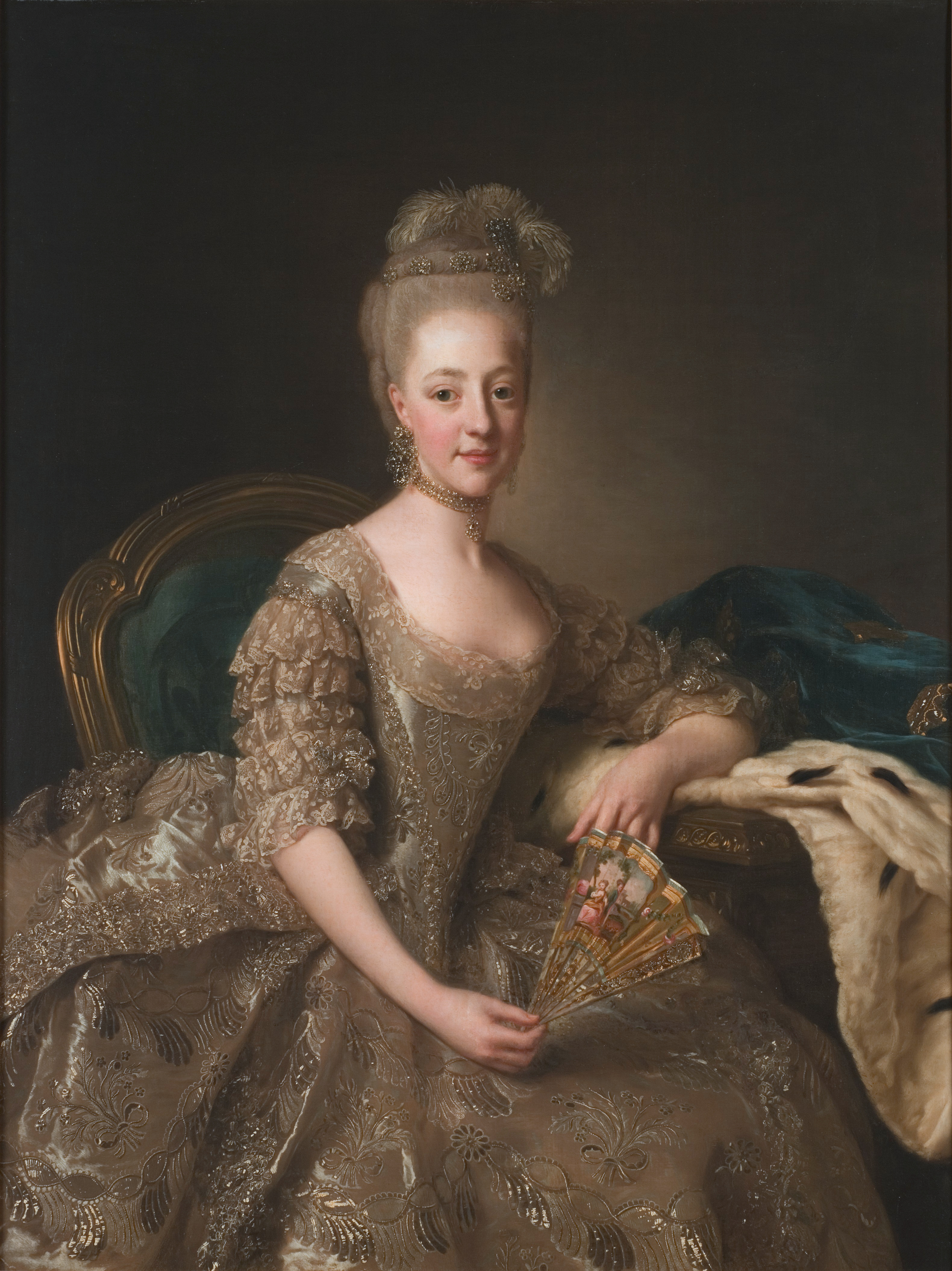
Roslin, Alexander - Hedvig Elisabeth Charlotte of Holstein-Gottorp

The Robe de cour, also known as robe de corpse, grand habit and grand habit de cour, was a women's fashion of 18th-century Europe. It was the most formal dress model worn after 1700, when the mantua dress had replaced it in all but the most formal occasions, and continued to be worn as court dress during the entire century.

Court dress, the grand habit de cour or "stiff-bodied" gown, retained the styles of the 1670s after it had been replaced by the mantua dress in all other but the most formal occasions in the end of the 17th-century. It featured a low, oval neckline that bared the shoulders, and the heavily boned bodice laced closed in back, unlike the front-opening robe. The elbow-length sleeves were covered with tiers of lace flounces, echoing the full-sleeved chemise worn with the original style.

== Galleries ==
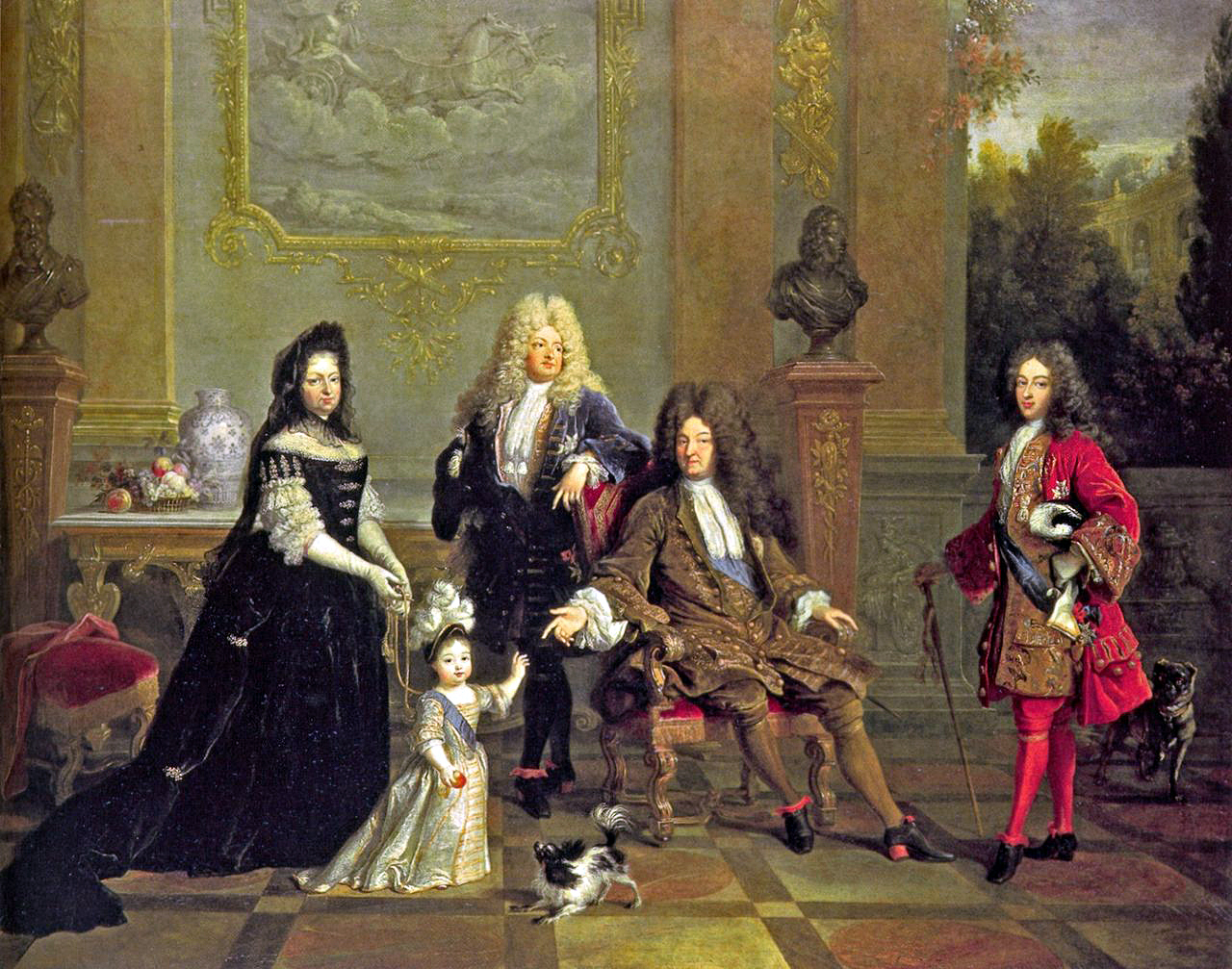
Madame de Ventadour (left)

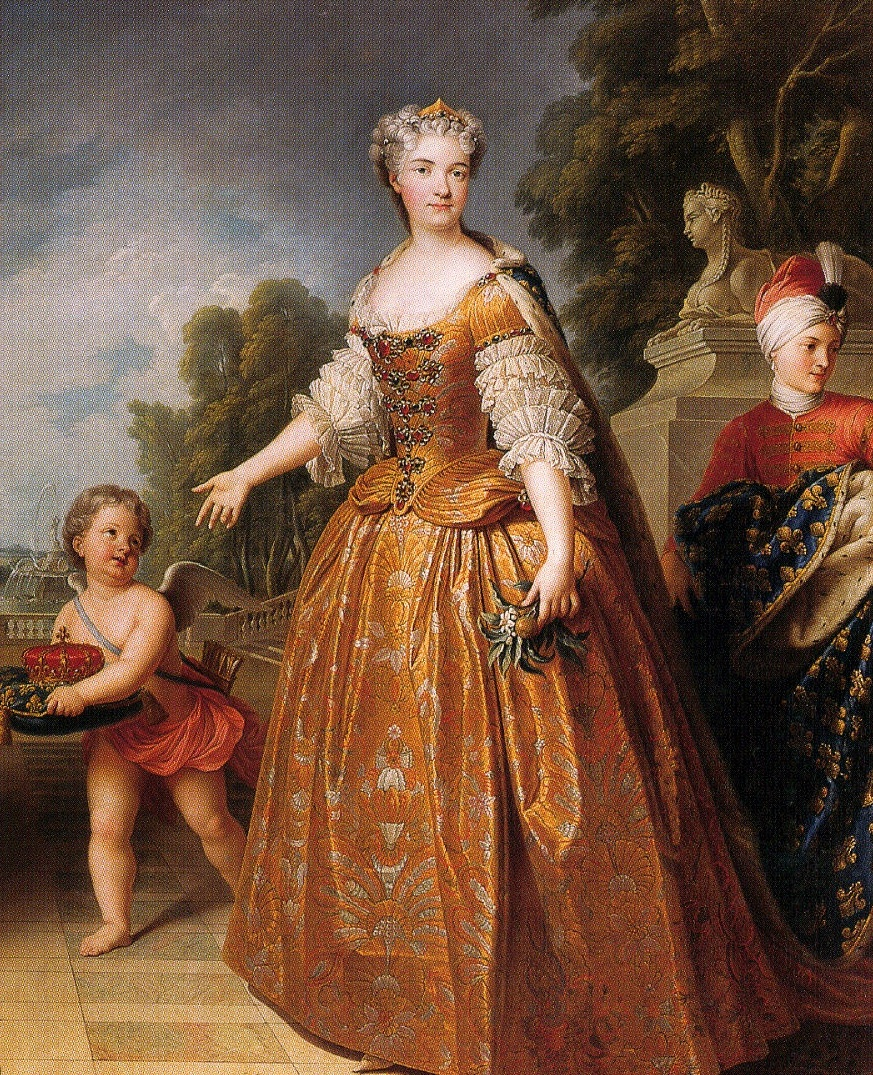
Maria Lescynska

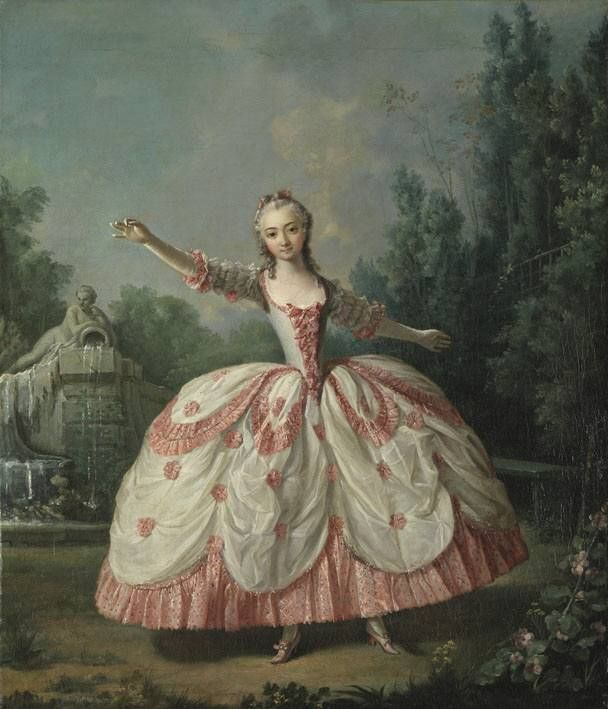
Ballerina Marianne Cochois.

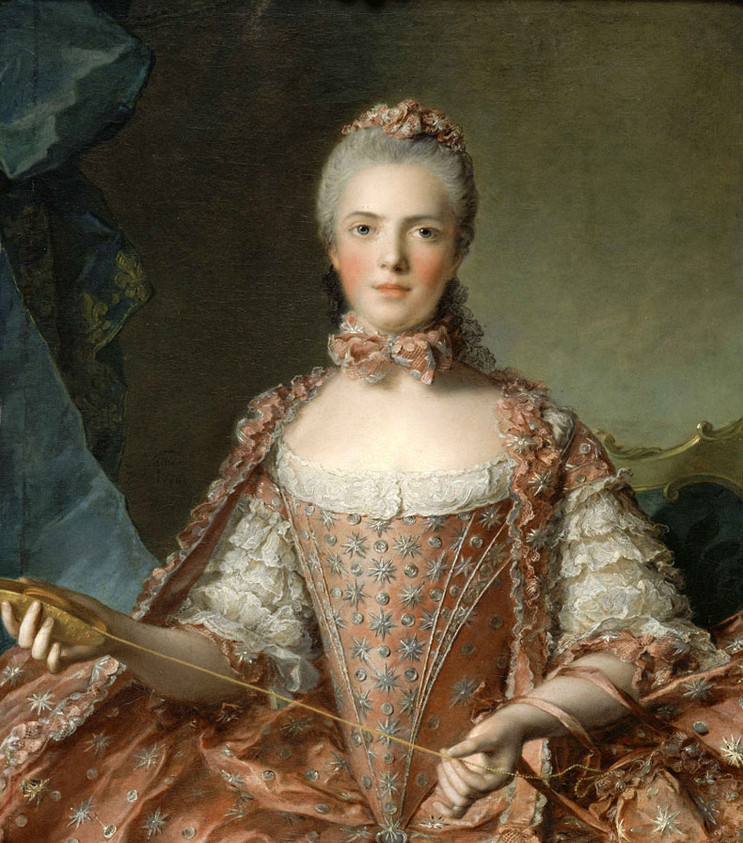
Jean-Marc Nattier, Madame Adélaïde de France faisant des nœuds (1756).

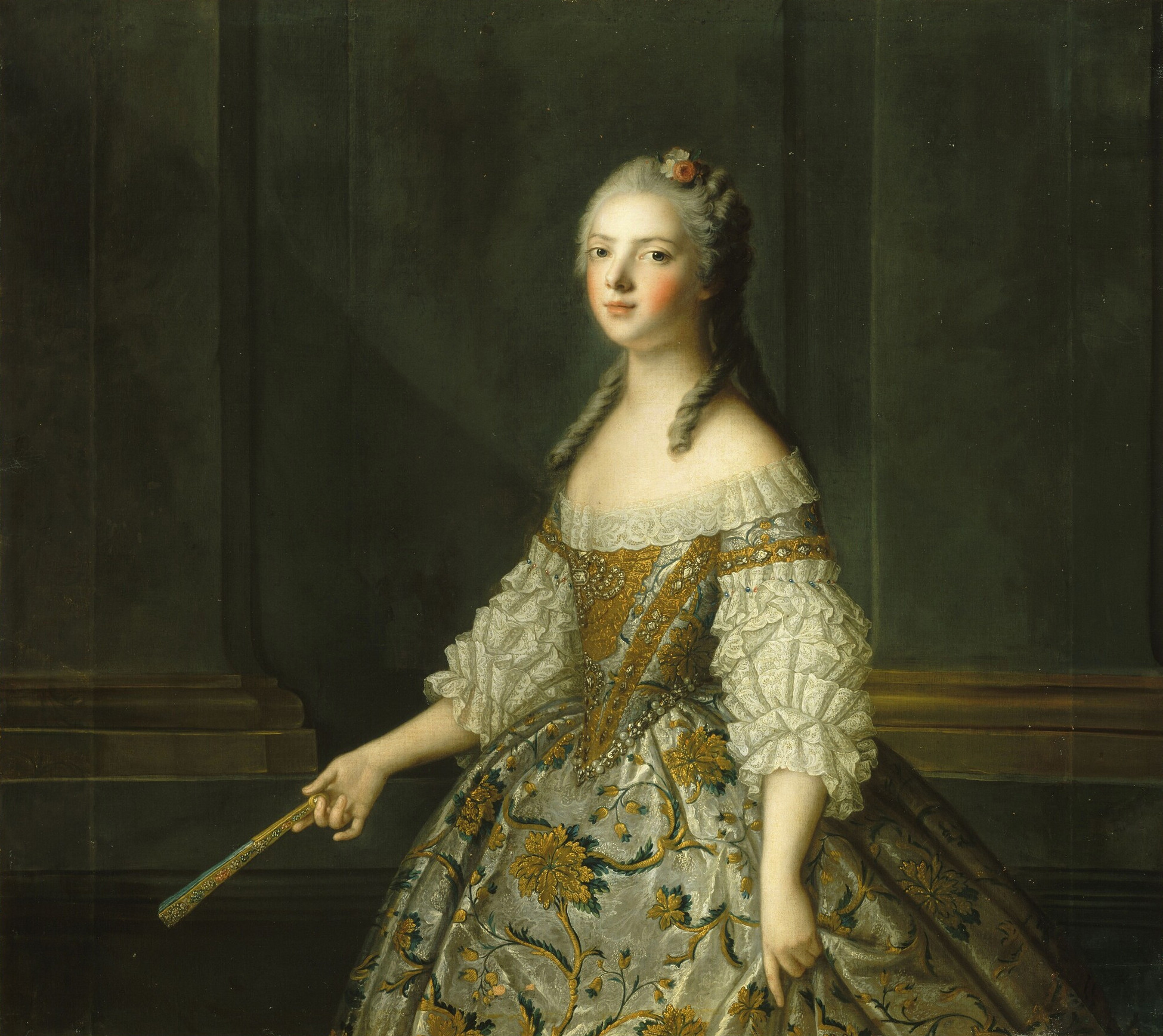
Madame Adélaïde de France tenant un éventail by the studio of J.-M. Nattier.

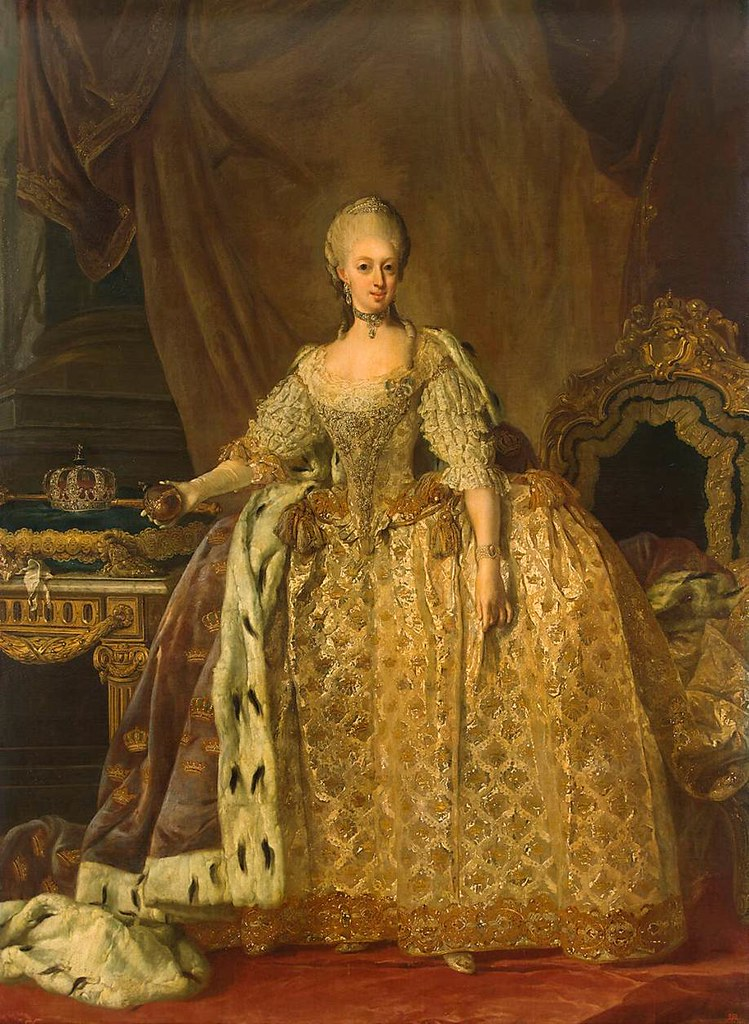
Sophia Magdalena of Danmark.

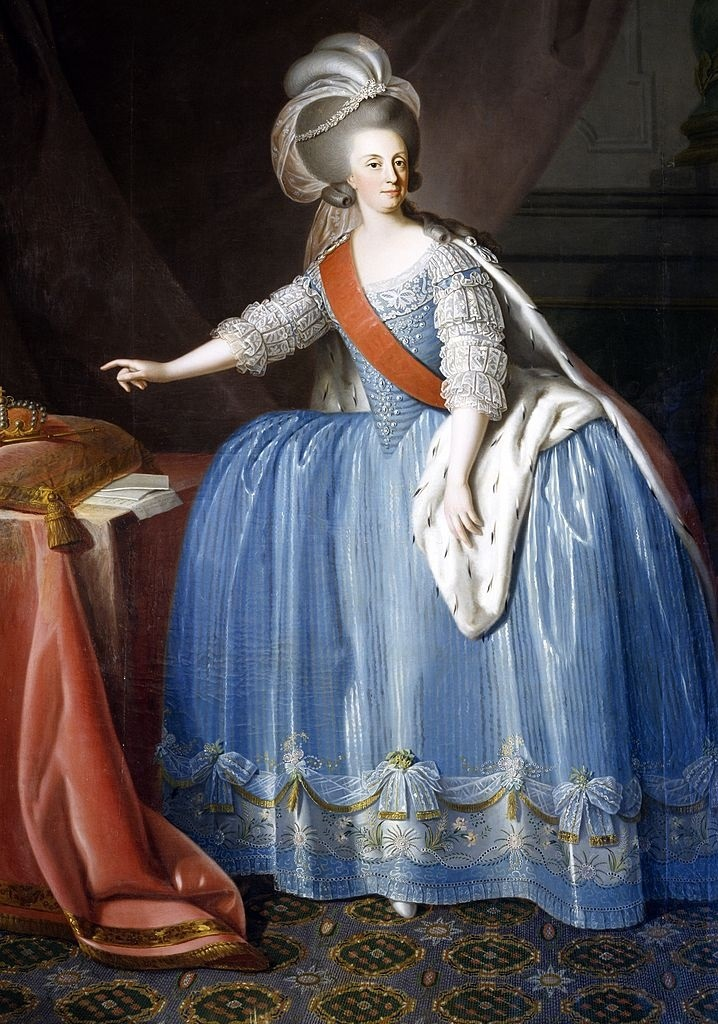
Queen Maria I of Portugal

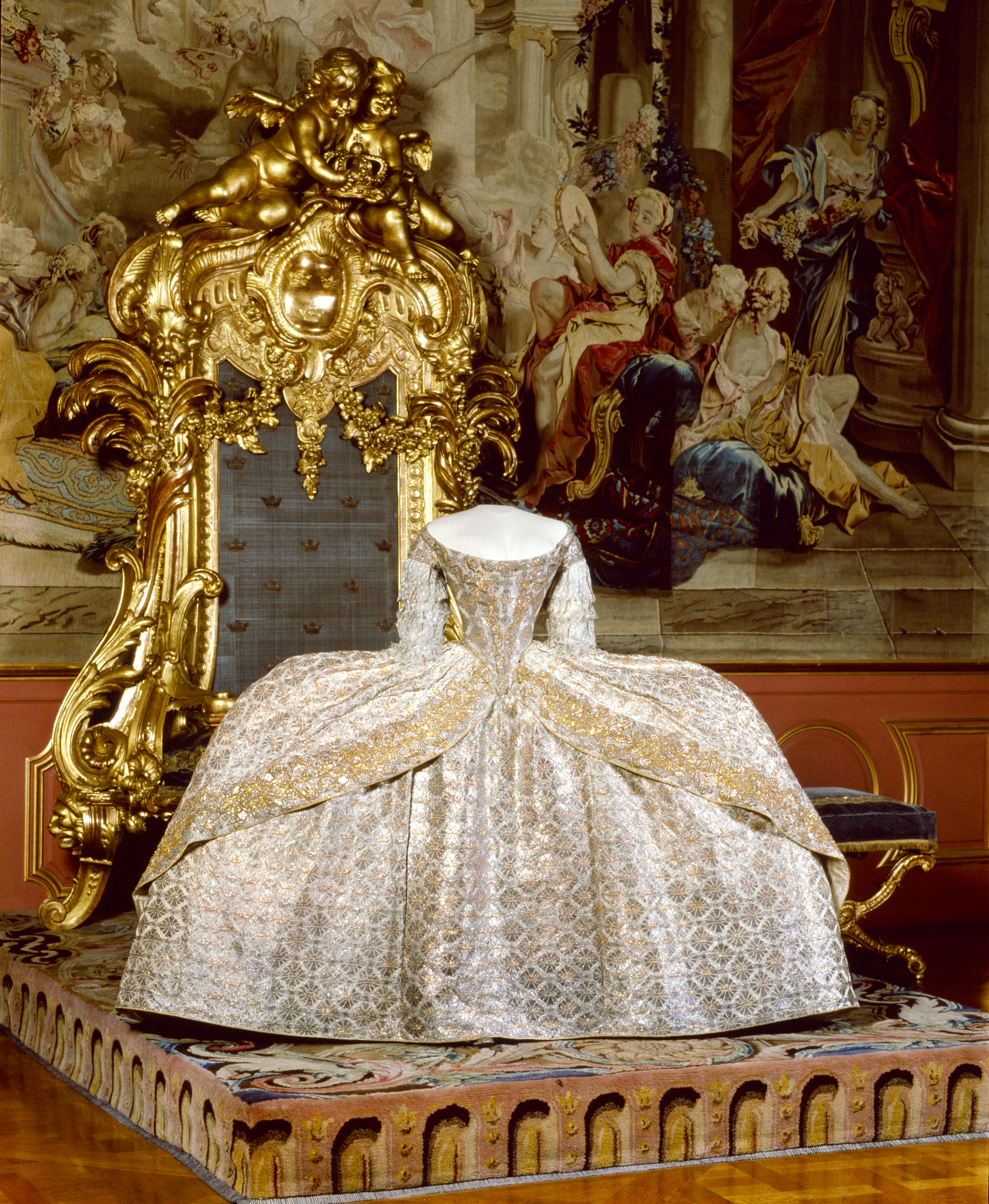
Coronation gown of Louisa Ulrika of Prussia, kröningsklänning - Livrustkammare (1751)

== See also ==
- 1700–1750 in fashion
- 1750–1775 in fashion

== Bibliography ==
- Arnold, Janet. Patterns of Fashion 1: Englishwomen's dresses & their construction c. 1660–1860, Drama Publishers, 1977. ISBN 0-89676-026-X
- Burnston, Sharon Ann. Fitting and Proper: 18th Century Clothing from the Collection of the Chester County Historical Society, Scurlock Pub Co, 2000. ISBN 1-880655-10-1
- Hart, Avril, and Susan North. Seventeenth and Eighteenth-Century Fashion in Detail, V&A Publishing, 2009. ISBN 1-85177-567-6
- Jackson, Anna, ed. (2001). V&A: A Hundred Highlights. V&A Publications.
- Ribeiro, Aileen: The Art of Dress: Fashion in England and France 1750–1820, Yale University Press, 1995, ISBN 0-300-06287-7
- Ribeiro, Aileen: Dress in Eighteenth Century Europe 1715–1789, Yale University Press, 2002, ISBN 0-300-09151-6
