= Devonshire House Ball of 1897 =

Social event in London, England

Coordinates: 51.5073°N 0.1428°W

The Devonshire House Ball or the Devonshire House Fancy Dress Ball was an elaborate fancy dress ball, hosted by Spencer Cavendish, 8th Duke of Devonshire and Louisa Cavendish, Duchess of Devonshire, held on 2 July 1897 at Devonshire House in Piccadilly to celebrate the Diamond Jubilee of Queen Victoria. Due to the many prominent royals, aristocrats, and society figures who attended as well as the overall lavishness of the ball, it was considered the event of the 1897 London Season.

== Event ==
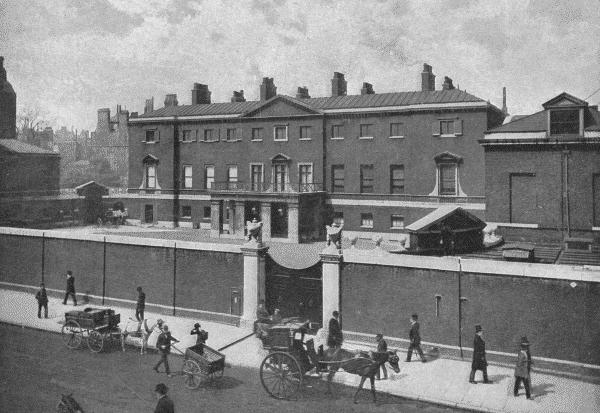
Devonshire House as featured in The Queen's London (1896)

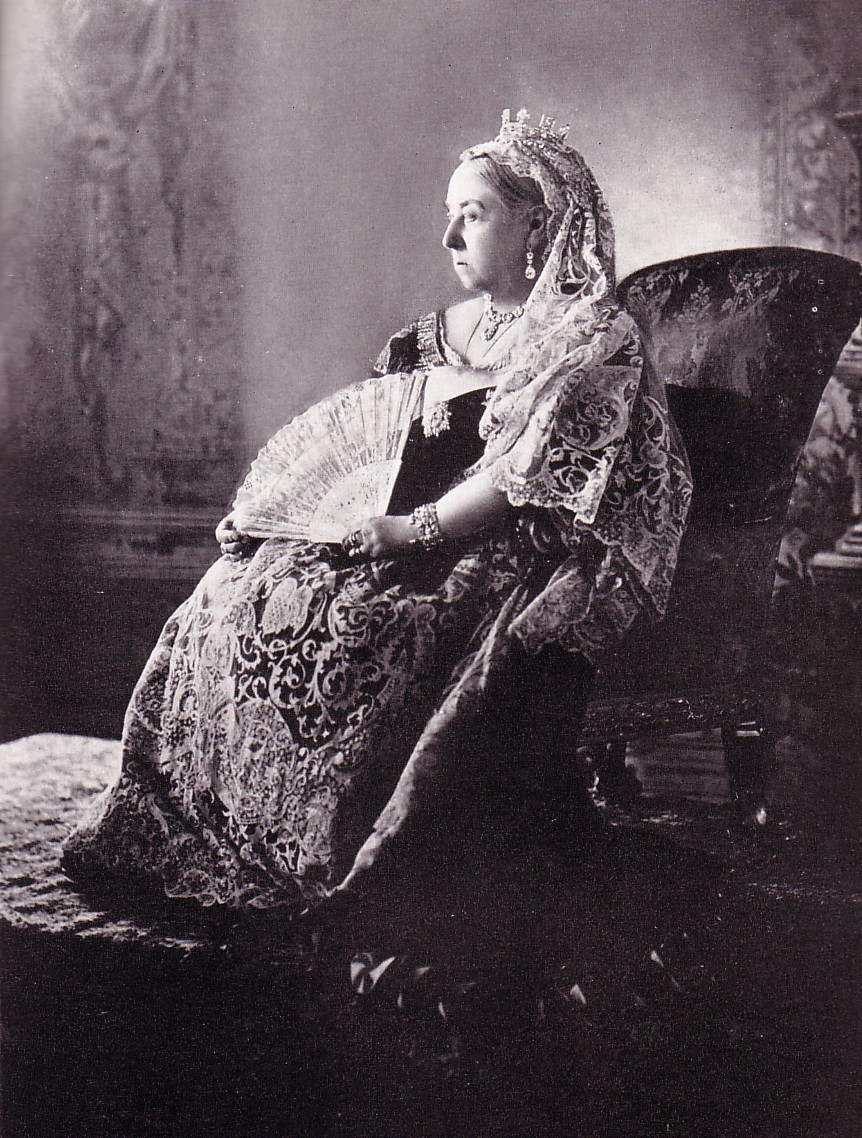
Victoria in her official Diamond Jubilee photograph by W. & D. Downey

In 1897, The Duke and Duchess of Devonshire hosted the Devonshire House Ball at Devonshire House, the London residence (in Piccadilly) of the Dukes of Devonshire in the 18th and 19th centuries. The Duke had served as a Member of Parliament and a cabinet minister as a member of the Liberal Party and the Duchess, known as the Double Duchess, was the widow of William Montagu, 7th Duke of Manchester.

Following the death of Prince Albert in 1861, Queen Victoria withdrew from social life and "the mantle of royal entertaining" was passed to the Prince of Wales and his wife, Alexandra. During the 1870s, they hosted a costume ball at Marlborough House, their London residence, which was considered a success and carried on the popularity of such events. The Devonshires, who were close friends of the Prince and Princess of Wales, therefore, decided to throw a costume ball to celebrate Queen Victoria's diamond jubilee. The Queen's Diamond Jubilee procession had taken place on 22 June 1897 and followed a route six miles long through London. More than 700 invitations were sent out a month before the event, although some reports of the event stated up to 3,000 invites. By accident, Alfred, Duke of Saxe-Coburg and Gotha and Maria, the Duchess of Saxe-Coburg and Gotha did not receive invitations. When the Duchess of Devonshire saw her at a different jubilee fête and asked if she was coming, "the Duchess of Saxe-Coburg and Gotha freezingly replied, 'Certainly not'".

While the Queen did not attend, almost all of the British royal family attended the ball and nearly every other European royal family was represented. The Duke of Devonshire invited the London photographic firm of James Lafayette, who had been awarded a Royal Warrant ten years previously, to set up a tent (in the garden behind the house) to photograph the guests in costume during the Ball. In 1899, the studio of Walker & Boutal published 286 of the Lafayette photographs.

Following the ball, the Duchess received a letter from Francis Knollys, Private Secretary to the Sovereign, indicating that the Prince, later King Edward VII, who arrived after 11 o'clock, thought the party a success.

=== Notable attendees ===
At the ball, the attendees included:

- The Prince of Wales, who dressed as the Grand Master of the Knights Hospitallers of Malta, and the Princess of Wales as Queen Margaret of Valois and Louvima Knollys (daughter of Viscount Knollys) as her page.
- The Duke of York as George Clifford, 3rd Earl of Cumberland, and the Duchess of York as a Lady of the Court of Margaret of Valois.
- Tsar Nicholas II of Russia and Tsarina of Russia dressed in old Court dress of the time of Peter the Great
- Alfred, Duke of Saxe-Coburg and Gotha, as Robert I, Duke of Normandy
- Spencer Cavendish, 8th Duke of Devonshire, as Charles V, Holy Roman Emperor, and the Duchess of Devonshire, who dressed as Zenobia, Queen of Palmyra.
- Lady Evelyn Cavendish (later Duchess of Devonshire), who attended in the dress of a Lady at the Court of the Empress Maria Theresa, while her husband, who later became the 9th Duke of Devonshire, dressed in sixteenth-century costume.
- Prince Arthur, Duke of Connaught and Strathearn and Princess Louise Margaret of Prussia, the Duchess of Connaught
- Francis, Duke of Teck and Princess Mary Adelaide of Cambridge, the Duchess of Teck
- Alexander Duff, 1st Duke of Fife and Princess Louise of Wales, the Duchess of Fife
- Charles Spencer-Churchill, 9th Duke of Marlborough and Consuelo Vanderbilt, the Duchess of Marlborough
- Archibald Primrose, 5th Earl of Rosebery, the former Prime Minister of the United Kingdom
- Lady Randolph Spencer-Churchill, the mother of Winston Churchill, attended in byzantine costume as the Empress Theodora
- Sir Henry Irving, the actor
- Arthur James Balfour
- Daisy Greville, Countess of Warwick, the wife of Francis Greville, 5th Earl of Warwick, dressed as Marie Antoinette.
- Charlotte Spencer, Countess Spencer, the wife of John Spencer, 5th Earl Spencer, dressed as Margaret Douglas, Countess of Lennox, the mother of Henry Stuart, Lord Darnley.
- Arnold Morley
- Henry Innes-Ker, 8th Duke of Roxburghe
- Lord Basil Blackwood
- Prince Victor Duleep Singh, the son of Maharajah Duleep Singh, also attended the Ball.
- Ernest Cassel
- Alfred Beit
- Rupert Guinness, 2nd Earl of Iveagh
- Nathan Rothschild, 1st Baron Rothschild
- John Hay, the U.S. Ambassador to the United Kingdom
- Henry White, as Henri de Lorraine, Duc de Guise, and his wife, Margaret Stuyvesant Rutherfurd, as Morosina Morosini
- General Blue and Miss Sanger, guests from the United States Embassy, wore 18th-century velvet court dress.
- The Duchess of Newcastle dressed as Princess Dashkova
- Prince Charles of Denmark and Princess Charles of Denmark and Princess Victoria, who dressed as Ladies of the Court of Marguerite de Valois
- The Duchess of Rutland as Mary Isabella, Duchess of Rutland after Cosway.
- Lady Lister-Kaye, the sister of the Duchess of Manchester and the wife of Sir John Pepys Lister-Kaye, 3rd Baronet as the Duchesse de Guise in the time of Henry III.
- Thomas Lister, 4th Baron Ribblesdale and Lady Ribblesdale.
- Roundell Palmer, 1st Earl of Selborne and Lady Selborne.
- The Marchioness of Londonderry, wife of Charles Vane-Tempest-Stewart, 6th Marquess of Londonderry, dressed as Maria Theresa of Austria.
- Gordon Chesney Wilson and Lady Sarah Wilson

=== Costumes ===
The Duchess of Devonshire's costume was described in detail by The Times:

"The Duchess of Devonshire, as Zenobia, Queen of Palmyra, wore a magnificent costume. The skirt of gold tissue was embroidered all over in a star-like design in emeralds, sapphires, diamonds, and other jewels outlined with gold, the corners where it opened in front being elaborately wrought in the same jewels and gold to represent peacocks outspread tails. This opened to show an underdress of cream crepe de chine, delicately embroidered in silver, gold, and pearls and sprinkled all over with diamonds. The train, which was attached to the shoulders by two slender points and was fastened at the waist with a large diamond ornament, was a green velvet of a lovely shade, and was superbly embroidered in Oriental designs introducing the lotus flower in rubies, sapphires, amethysts, emeralds, and diamonds, with four borderings on contrasting grounds, separated with gold cord. The train was lined with turquoise satin. The bodice was composed of gold tissue to match the skirt, and the front was of crepe de chine hidden with a stomacher of real diamonds, rubies and emeralds and jewelled belt. A gold crown incrusted (sic) with emeralds, diamonds, and rubies, with a diamond drop at each curved end and two upstanding white ostrich feathers in the middle, and round the front festoons of pearls with a large pear shaped pearl in the centre falling on the forehead."

One of the most expensive costumes was worn by Charles Spencer-Churchill, 9th Duke of Marlborough who went as the French Ambassador to the Court of Catherine the Great. The velvet costume was made by the House of Worth and was embroidered in silver, pearls and diamonds with a waistcoat made out of gold and white damask. The price of the costume, which cost 5,000 francs, reportedly even shocked the Duke, who had famously married American heiress Consuelo Vanderbilt in 1895.

== Legacy ==
The ball was reproduced on the London stage in Drury Lane in September 1897 "to the scandal of nobility and the amusement of the commoners." The ball was utilized as the setting for the last act of a new play entitled The White Heather by Cecil Raleigh and Henry Hamilton. The New York Times stated "the very possessions of royalter were 'desecrated' by exhibition on the stage, for the managers, with enterprise almost America, had purchased from the costumers some of the most gorgeous habiliments worn at that revel." The play inspired the 1919 film, The White Heather.

== Gallery ==
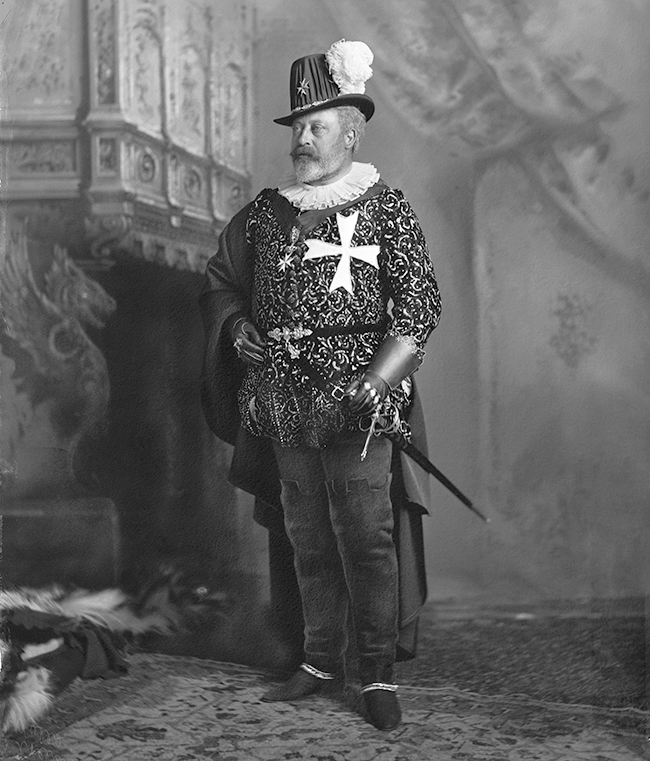
The Prince of Wales dressed as the Grand Master of the Knights Hospitallers of Malta

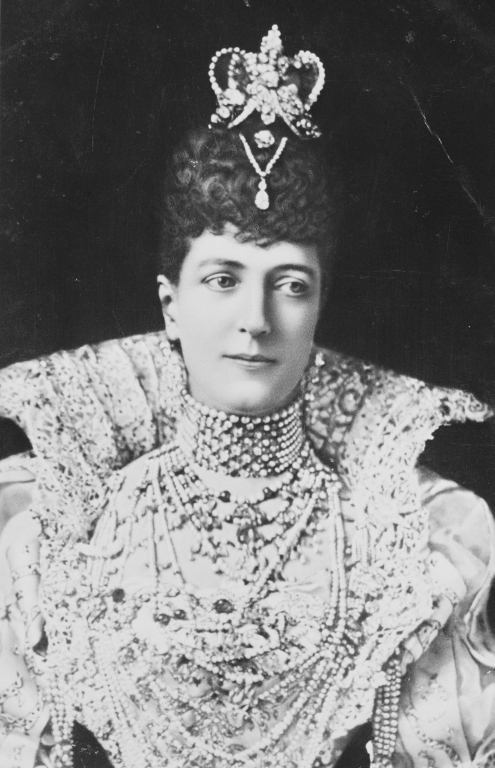
The Princess of Wales as Queen Marguerite de Valois

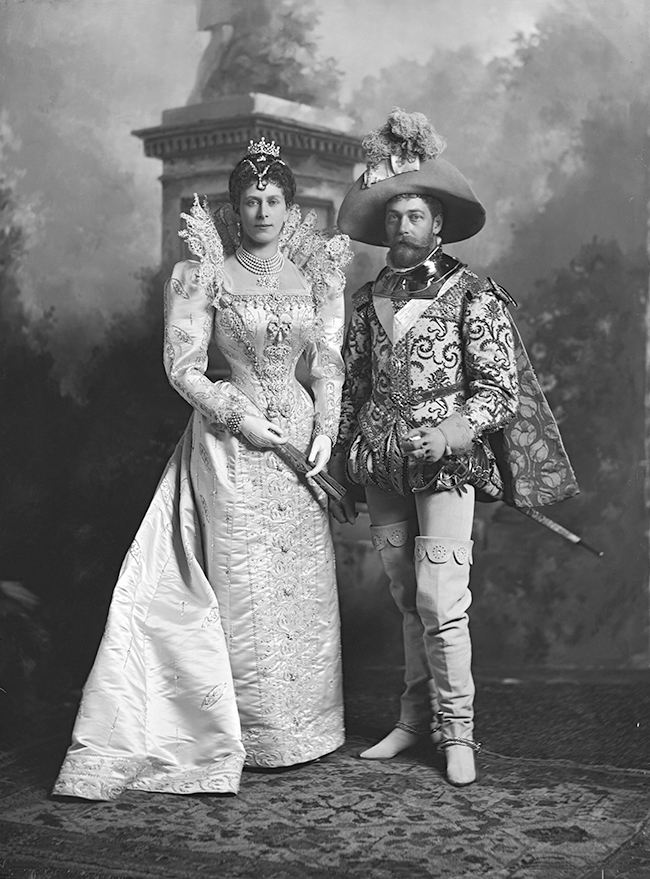
The Duke of York as The Earl of Cumberland, and The Duchess of York as a Lady of the Court of Marguerite de Valois

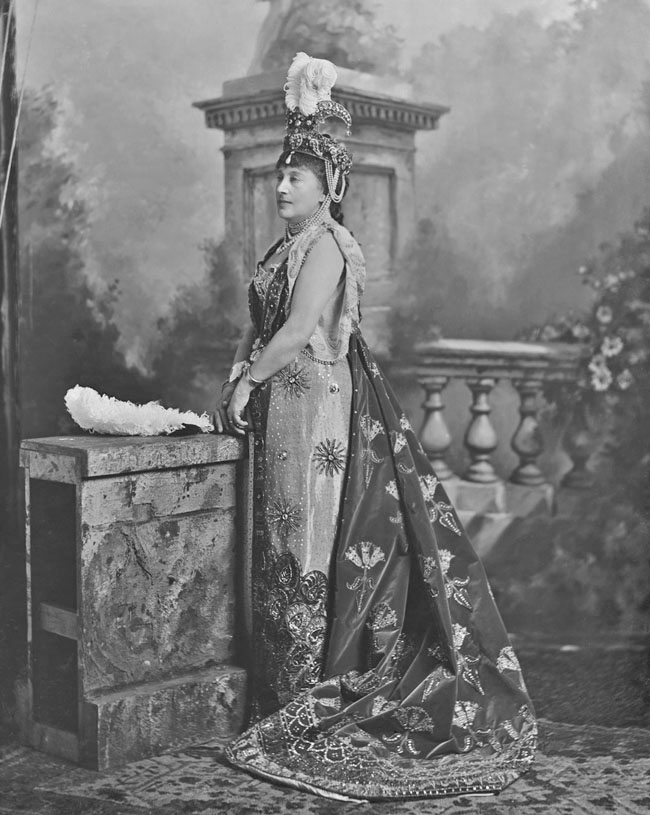
The Duchess of Devonshire as Zenobia, Queen of Palmyra

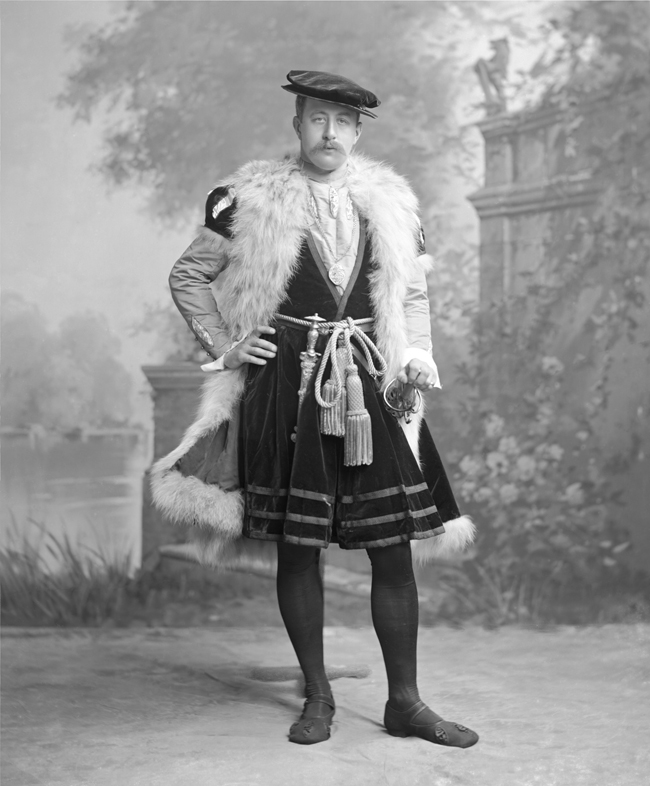
Victor Cavendish (later the 9th Duke of Devonshire) as Jean de Dinteville from Hans Holbein's painting, The Ambassadors

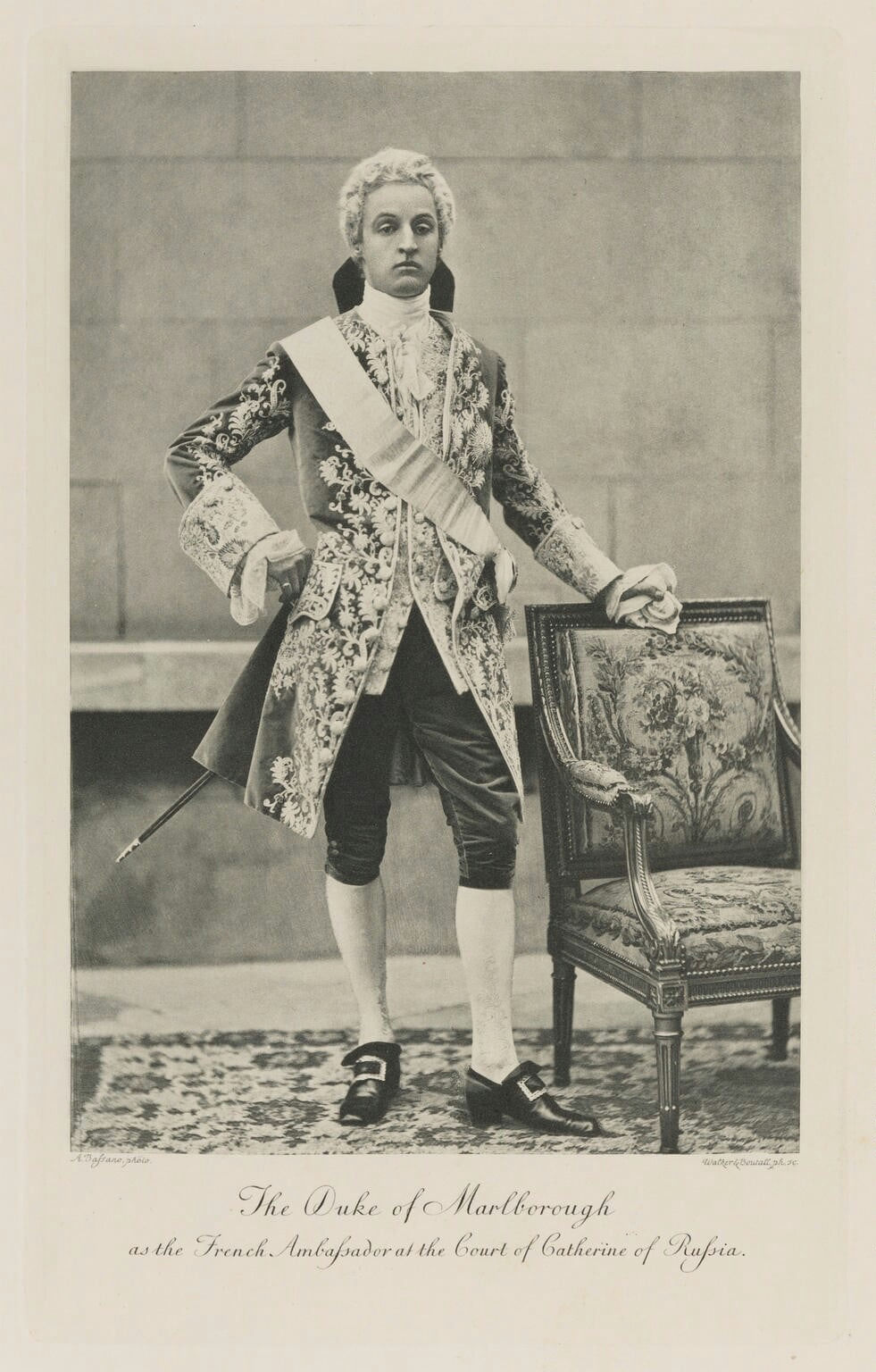
The Duke of Marlborough as the French Ambassador to the Court of Catherine the Great

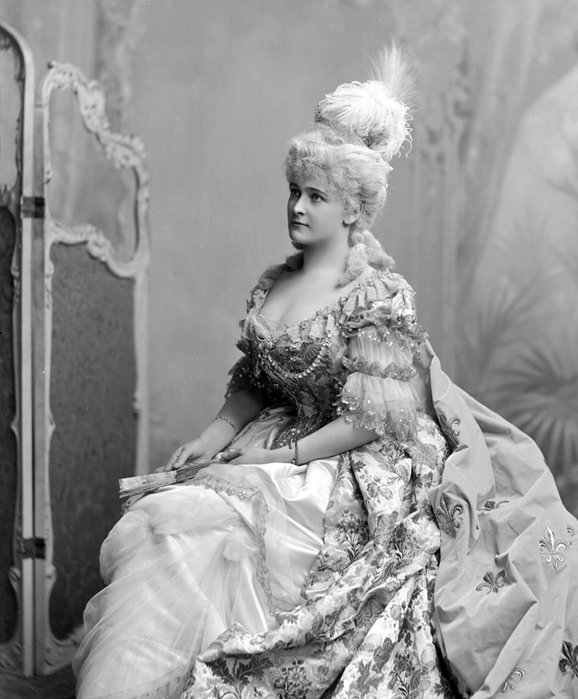
The Countess of Warwick, dressed as Marie Antoinette.

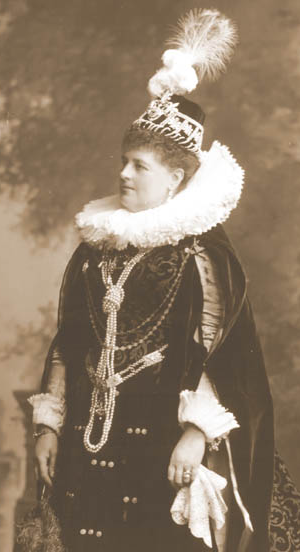
The Countess Spencer as Margaret Douglas, Countess of Lennox

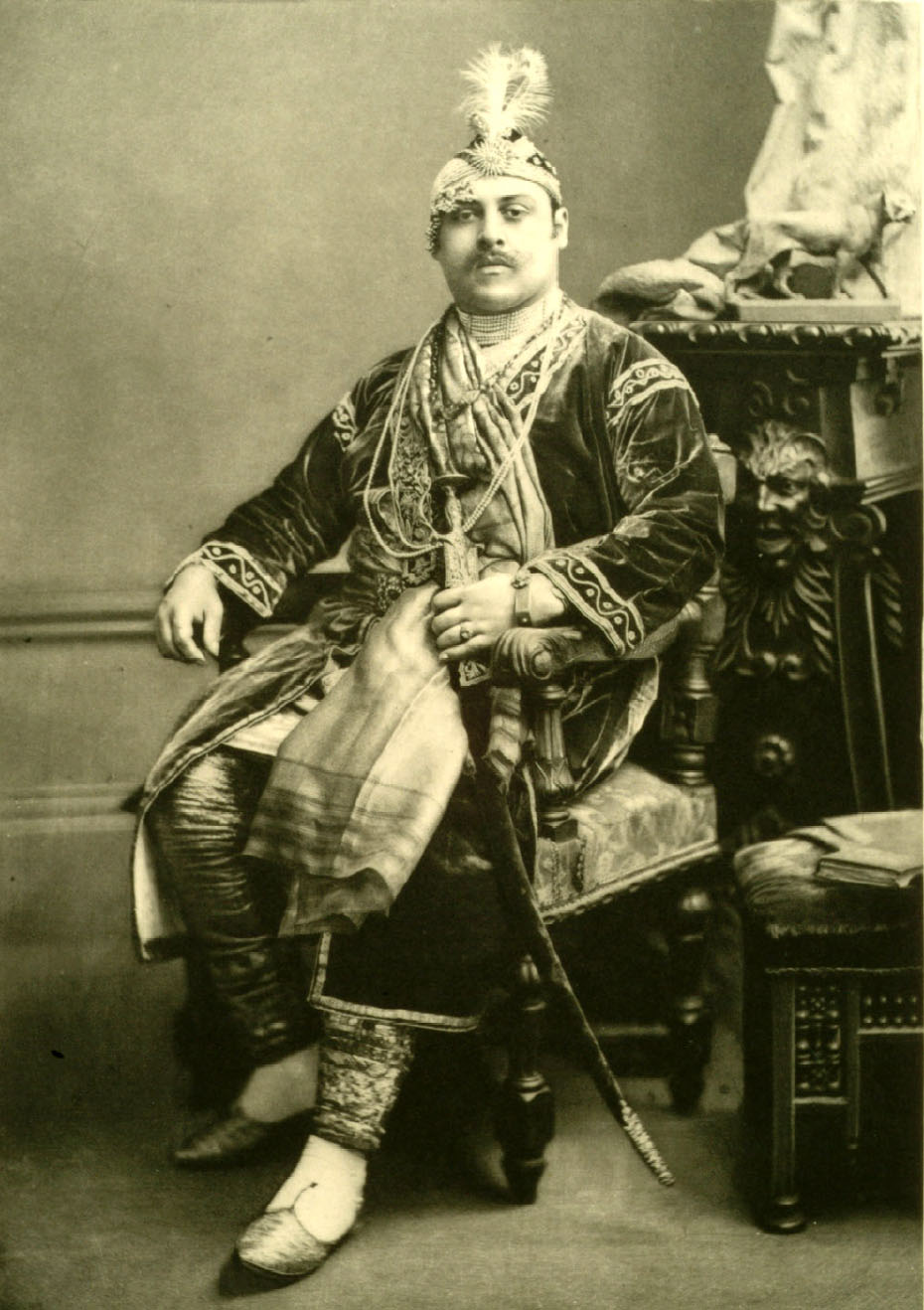
Prince Victor Duleep Singh

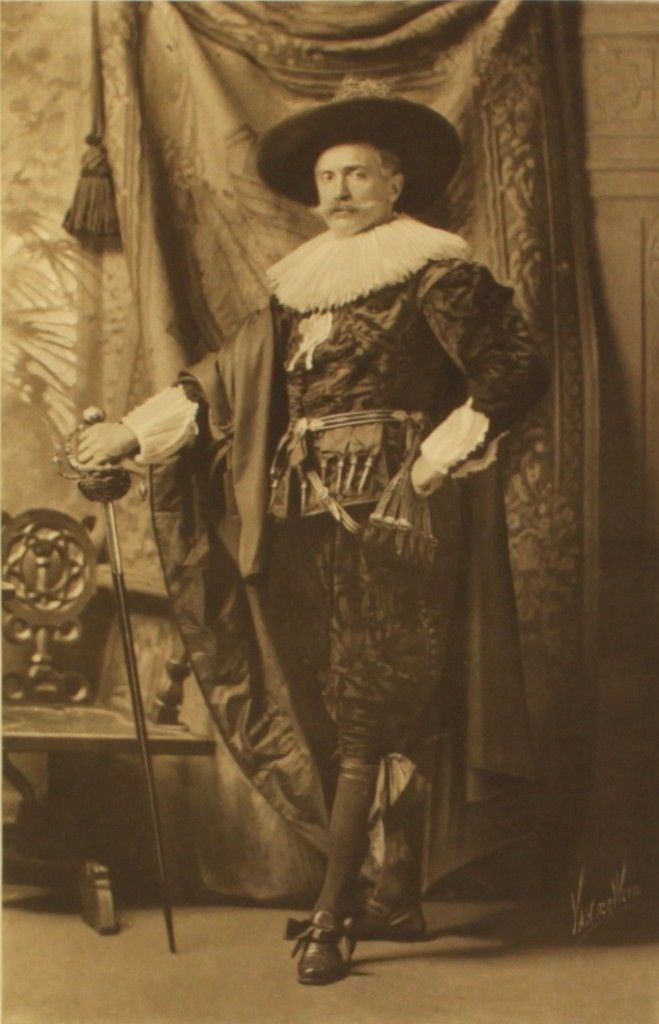
Viscount D'Abernon dressed as the Frans Hals' painting Willem van Heythuysen Posing with a Sword

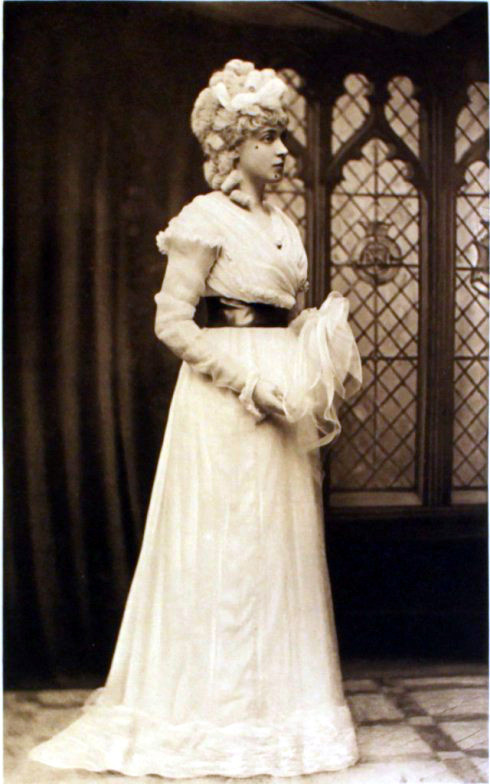
The Countess of Lytton dressed as Lady Melbourne

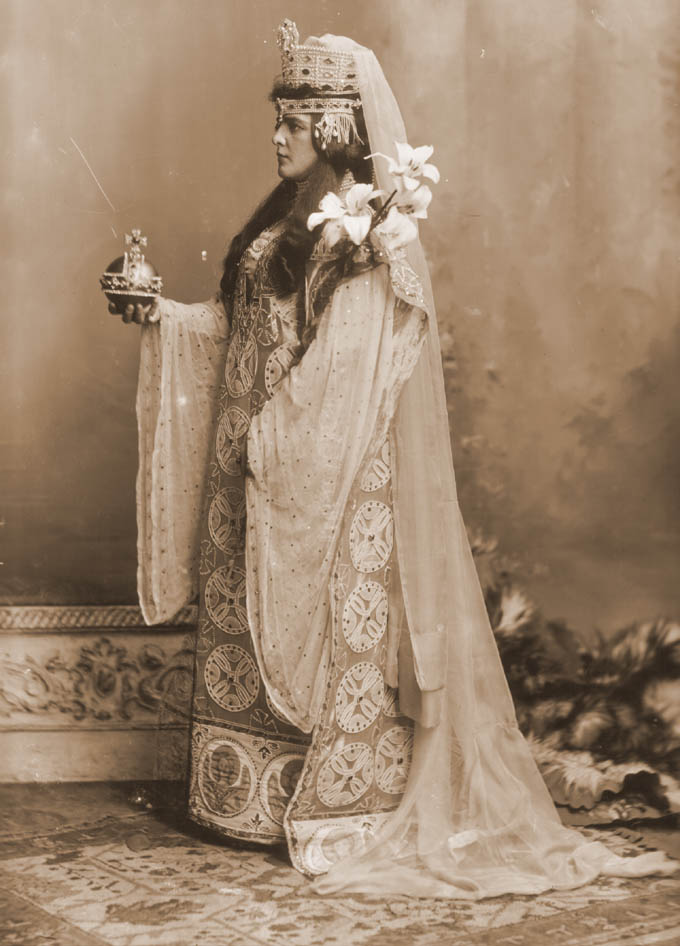
Lady Randolph Spencer-Churchill in byzantine costume as the Empress Theodora

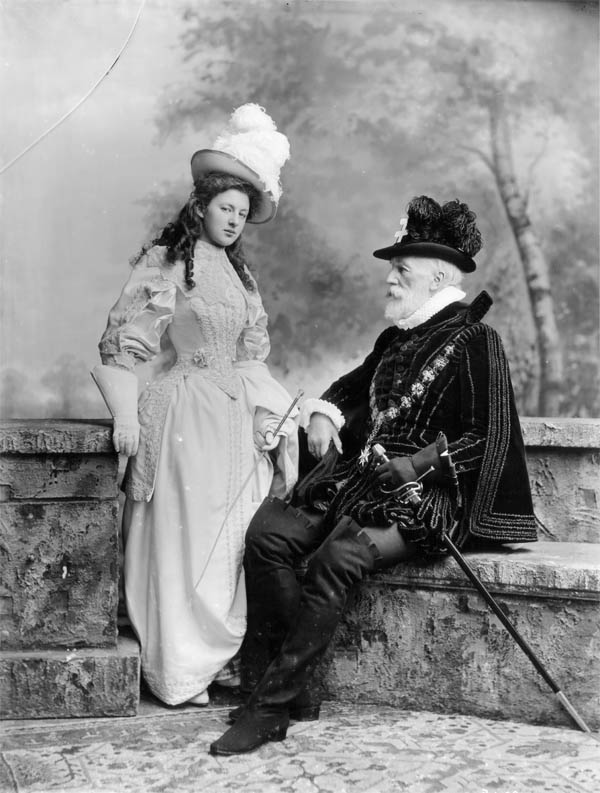
Lady Clementine Hay as Valentine and her father, The Marquess of Tweeddale, as St. Bris from Les Huguenots

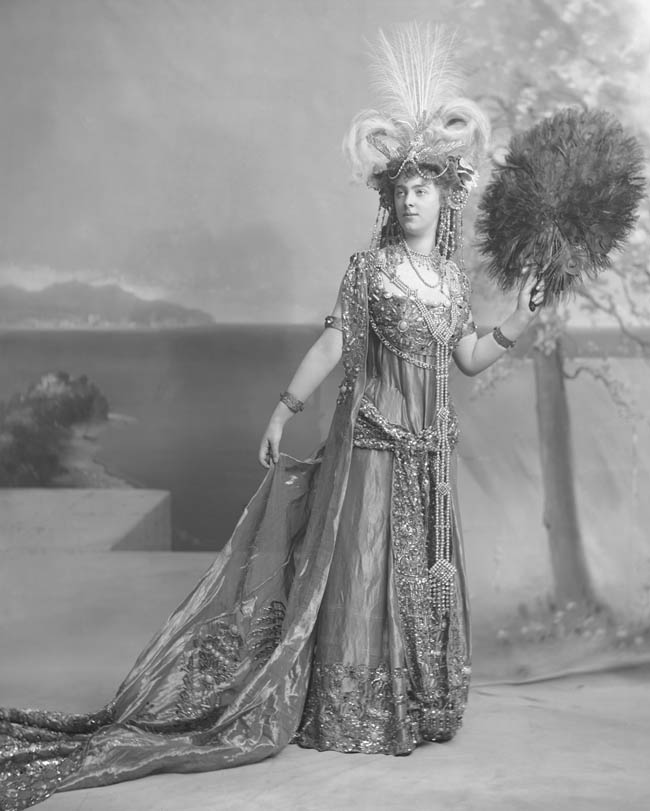
Daisy, Princess of Pless as Cleopatra

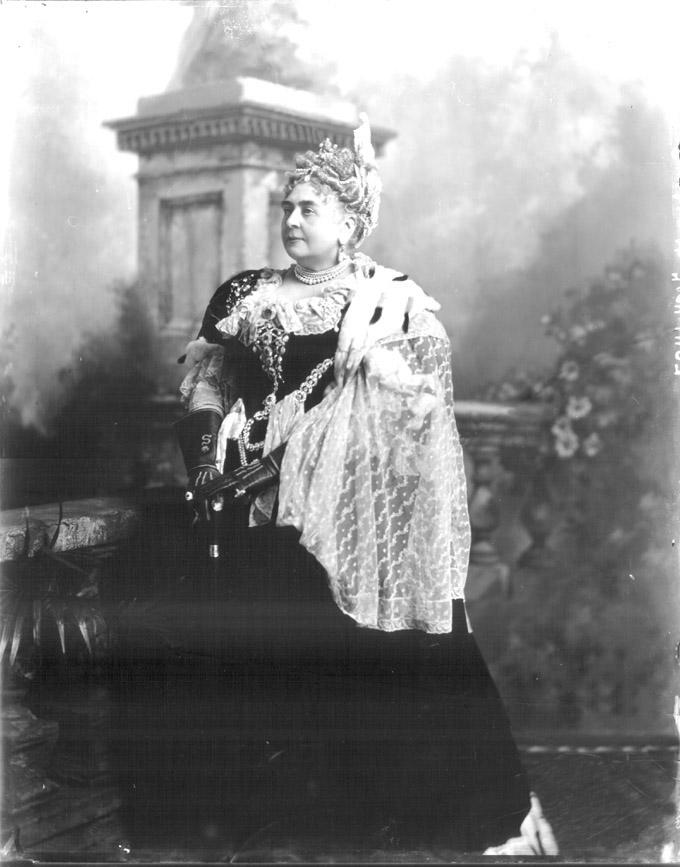
Princess Mary Adelaide of Cambridge as her ancestress, Princess Sophia of Hanover

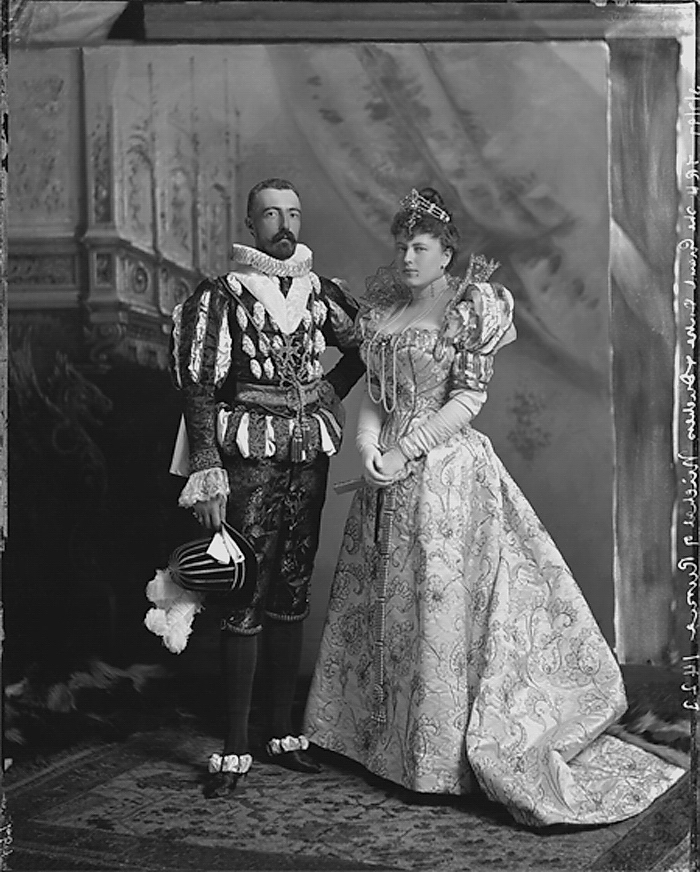
Grand Duke Michael Mikhailovich of Russia and his wife, The Countess of Torby, as King Henry IV of France and Gabrielle d'Estrées

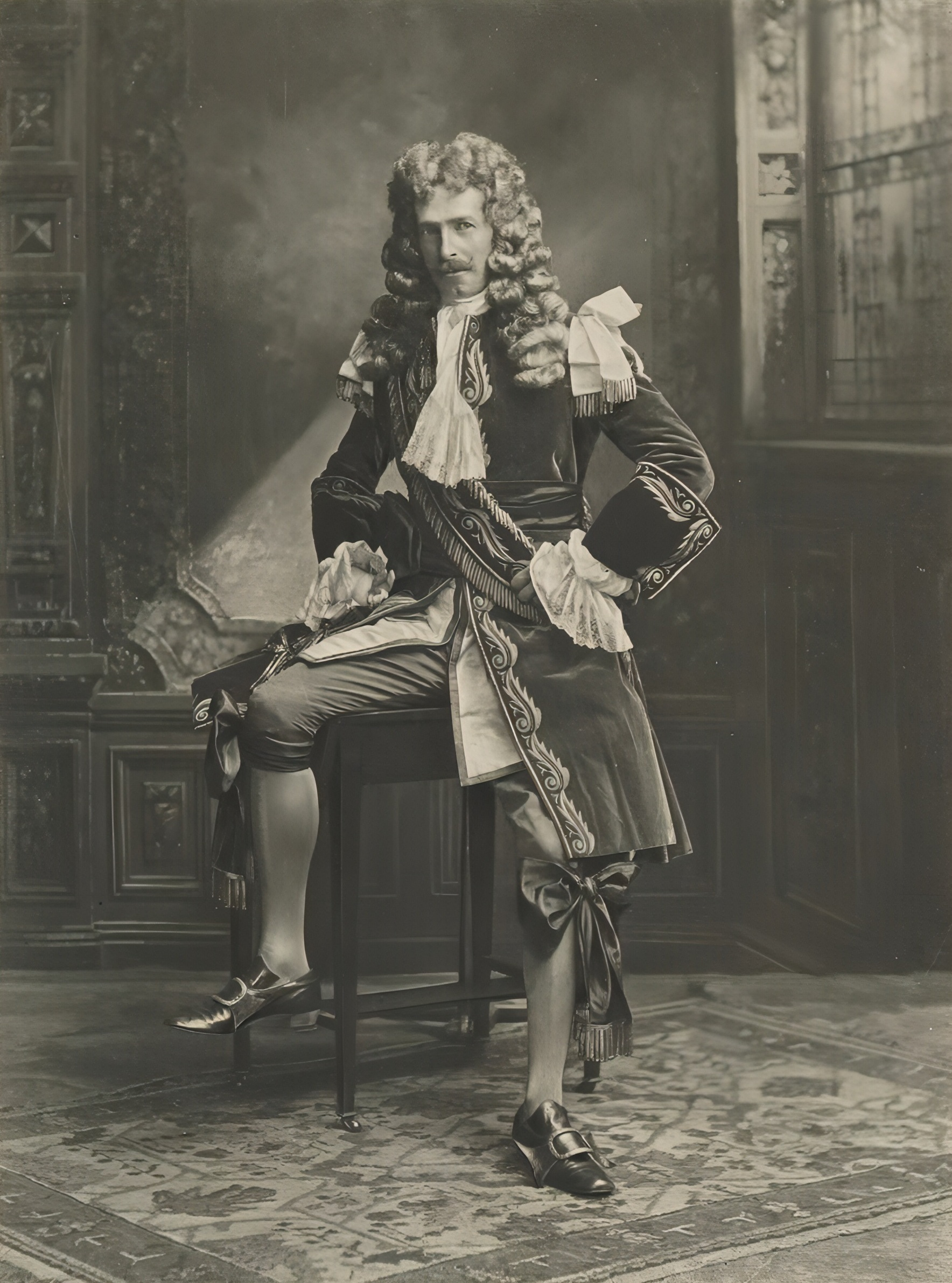
Gordon Chesney Wilson as a Captain in the Blues

== See also ==
- Duchess of Richmond's ball
- Bradley-Martin Ball
- Shakespeare Memorial National Theatre Ball
- Bal Costumé
