= Shakespeare Memorial National Theatre Ball =

Fundraising event in London, England

Coordinates: 51.50103°N 0.17741°W

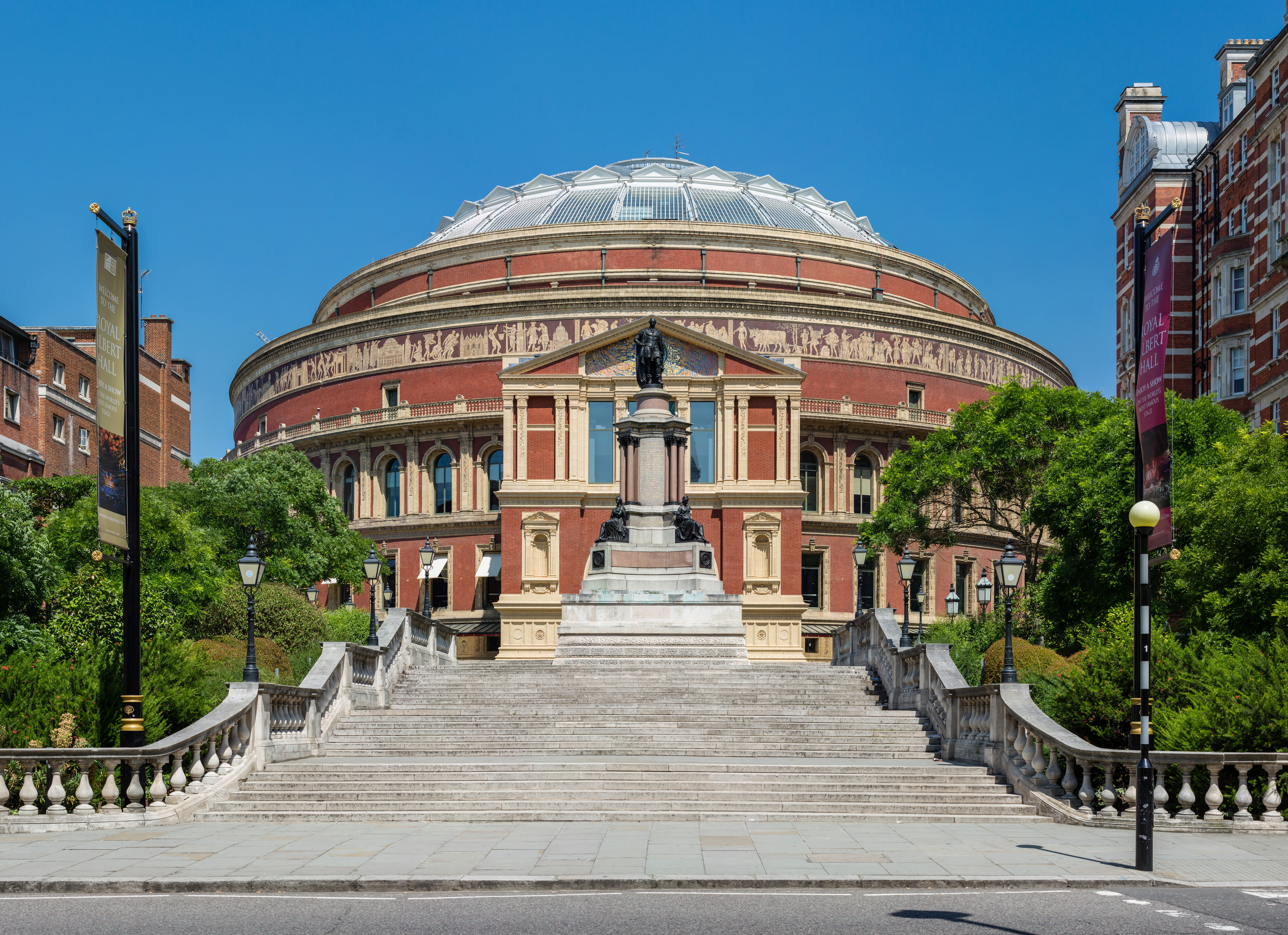
The Royal Albert Hall was the venue of the ball

The Shakespeare Memorial National Theatre Ball was an elaborate ball and fundraising event held in the Royal Albert Hall in 1911. It was noted for the lavishly decorated venue, costumes, and high profile of many of the guests in attendance.

The ball hoped to raise funds for a national theatre dedicated to Shakespeare for the tercentenary of his death in 1916. Despite the displays of wealth, the event only raised £10,000, or around £1,000,000 today, and it would fail to achieve its goal. Despite this, the ideas would eventually develop into the establishment of the extant National Theatre in London.

== Background ==
In the years leading up to 1916, there was much talk about a way to commemorate the tercentenary of Shakespeare's death. In 1908, the ideas of creating a national theatre and a memorial for Shakespeare would combine with the establishment of the "Shakespeare Memorial National Theatre General Committee". The committee acquired land intended for the theatre, where Senate House now stands. A further event, a Shakespeare Exhibition, would be held in Earl's Court the following year.

The ball was the idea of Mrs Cornwallis-West, mother of Winston Churchill, and was chaired and largely organised by her. The ball was possibly based on the Shakespeare Jubilee of 1769.

== Event ==
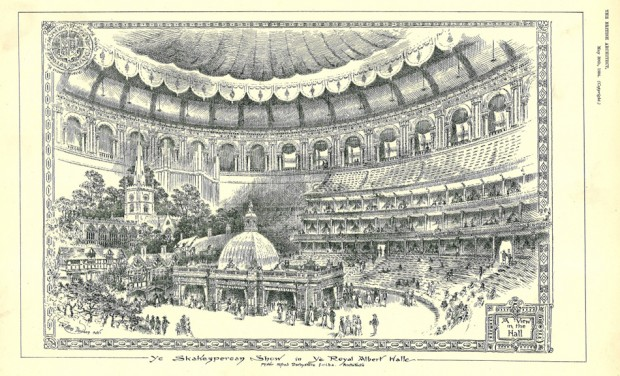
A postcard showing the inside of the Royal Albert Hall, visible are the elaborate decorations by Edwin Lutyens, including a full-scale church

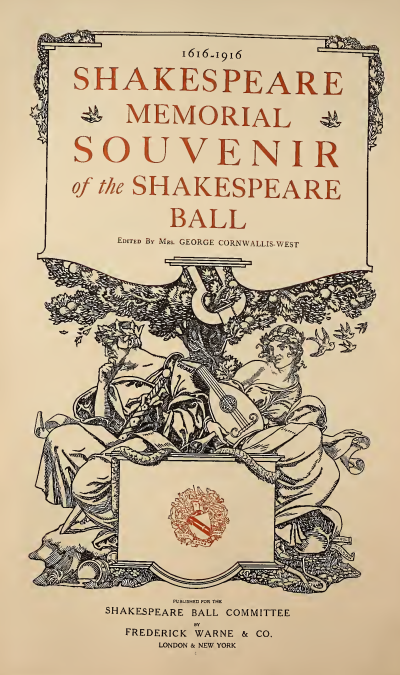
The Shakespeare Memorial Souvenir of the Shakespeare Ball was an Almanac associated for the event, sold for five guineas. It contained illustrations and essays as well as guest lists and photos

The ball was held in the Royal Albert Hall. Originally intended for the 27th of June 1910, it was delayed following the death of Edward VII. It would instead be held on the night of the 20th of June 1911, just two days before the Coronation of George V and Mary, and was thus attended by European royals and other members of high society who were present for the coronation. The sets were elaborate, including a life-size church, yew trees, and false skies to the designs and decoration of Edwin Lutyens.

=== Attendees ===
Many of the guests arrived in fancy dress, mostly as Shakespeare characters, with various parties dressed as the cast of various plays. The costumes were noted for their opulence and expense, particularly the jewellery worn by many of the guests. With a number of those present members of the aristocracy, many of them dressed as their own ancestors represented in Shakespeare's plays. Other than royalty and nobility, politicians and some actors were present. The attendance would total up to 4,000.

Royal guests were:

- Wilhelm and Duchess Cecilie of Mecklenburg-Schwerin, Crown Prince and Princess of Germany
- Şehzade Yusuf Izzeddin, Hereditary prince of the Ottoman Empire
- Archduke Charles Francis Joseph (future Charles I)
- Prince Emanuele Filiberto and Princess Hélène of Orléans, Duke and Duchess of Aosta
- Boris Vladimirovich of Russia, Grand Duke
- Infante Luis Fernando, Prince of Spain
- Higashifushimi Yorihito, Prince of Japan
- Constantine (future Constantine II) and Sophia of Prussia Crown Prince and Princess of Greece
- Carol (future Carol II) and Elisabeth of Wied, Crown Prince and Princess of Romania
- Alexander (future Alexander I), Hereditary Prince of Serbia
- Christian (future Christian X), Crown Prince of Denmark
- Gustaf Adolf (future Gustav VI Adolf), and Princess Margaret of Connaught Crown Prince and Princess of Sweden
- Boris (future Boris III), Prince of Bulgaria
- Danilo and Princess Milica of Montenegro, Crown Prince and Princess of Montenegro
- Ernest Louis and Princess Eleonore of Solms-Hohensolms-Lich, Grand Duke and Duchess of Hesse
- Frederick Francis IV, Grand Duke of Mecklenburg Schwerin
- Prince Henry of Prussia
- Charles Edward, Duke of Saxe-Coburg
- Henry of Mecklenburg-Schwerin, Prince of the Netherlands
- George and Marie Bonaparte, Prince and Princess of Greece and Denmark
- Prince Arthur, Duke of Connaught
- Princess Louise, Duchess of Argyle
- Princess Beatrice of Battenburg
- Princess Louise Margaret of Prussia, Duchess of Connaught
- Princess Helen of Waldeck and Pyrmont, Duchess of Albany
- Prince Arthur of Connaught
- Princess Patricia of Connaught
- Prince Maurice of Battenberg
- Prince Alexander of Battenberg
- The Duke of Teck
- Mohammed Ali Tewfik, Prince of Egypt
- Chakrabongse Bhuvanath, Prince of Siam

=== Shakespeare Memorial Souvenir ===
The event was accompanied by the Shakespeare Memorial Souvenir of the Shakespeare Ball containing a list of participants, photos of guests, illustrations, and several essays including by George Bernard Shaw who was in attendance. The almanac was edited by Mrs Cornwallis-West. An epilogue by Israel Gollancz suggested that the remainder of funds could be raised in time for the tercentenary five years later, but such fundraising would never materialise in large part due to the First World War.

== See also ==
- Shakespeare Jubilee
- Devonshire House Ball of 1897
- Coronation of George V and Mary
