= 1830s in Western fashion =

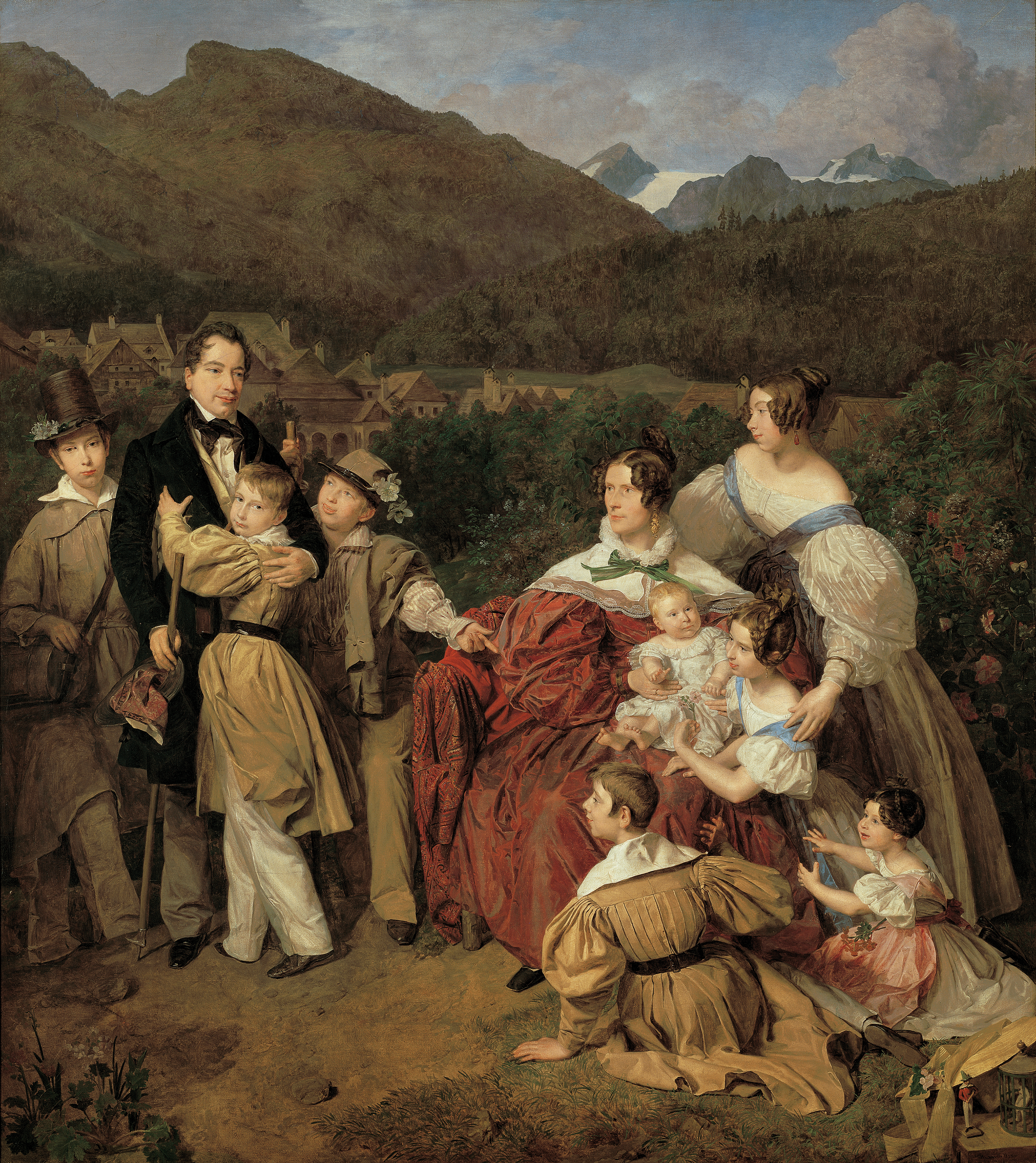
In the 1830s, men wore dark coats, light trousers, and dark cravats for daywear. Women's sleeves reached their ultimate width in the gigot sleeve. Here, the boys (on holiday in the mountains) wear buff-colored belted knee-length tunics with yokes and full sleeves over trousers. The girls wear white dresses with colored aprons. The Family of Dr. Josef August Eltz, Austria, 1835.

1830s fashion in Western and Western-influenced fashion is characterized by an emphasis on breadth, initially at the shoulder and later in the hips, in contrast to the narrower silhouettes that had predominated between 1800 and 1820.

Women's costume featured larger sleeves than were worn in any period before or since, which were accompanied by elaborate hairstyles and large hats.

The introduction of photography in the late 1830s led to the development of early photographic portraiture. These early portraits preserved some of the first photographic images of living people, providing historical documentation of clothing worn at the time and its role in everyday life and society

== General trends ==
The prevalent trend of Romanticism from the 1820s through the mid-1840s, with its emphasis on strong emotion as a source of aesthetic experience and its recognition of the picturesque, was reflected in fashion as in other arts. Items of historical dress including neck ruffs, ferronnières (jeweled headbands worn across the forehead), and sleeves based on styles of earlier periods were popular.

Innovations in roller printing on textiles introduced new dress fabrics. Rich colors such as the Turkey red of the 1820s were still found, but delicate floral prints on light backgrounds were increasingly popular. More precise printing eliminated the need for dark outlines on printed designs, and new green dyes appeared in patterns of grasses, ferns, and unusual florals. Combinations of florals and stripes were fashionable.

Overall, both men's and women's fashion showed width at the shoulder above a tiny waist. Men's coats were padded in the shoulders and across the chest, while women's shoulders sloped to huge sleeves.

== Women's fashions ==
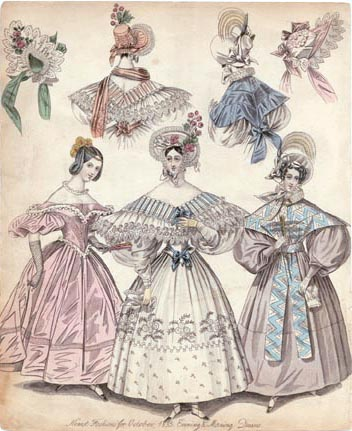
1833 Fashion Plate: evening gown (left) and two morning dresses. The lady on the right wears a fichu-pelerine (tippet).

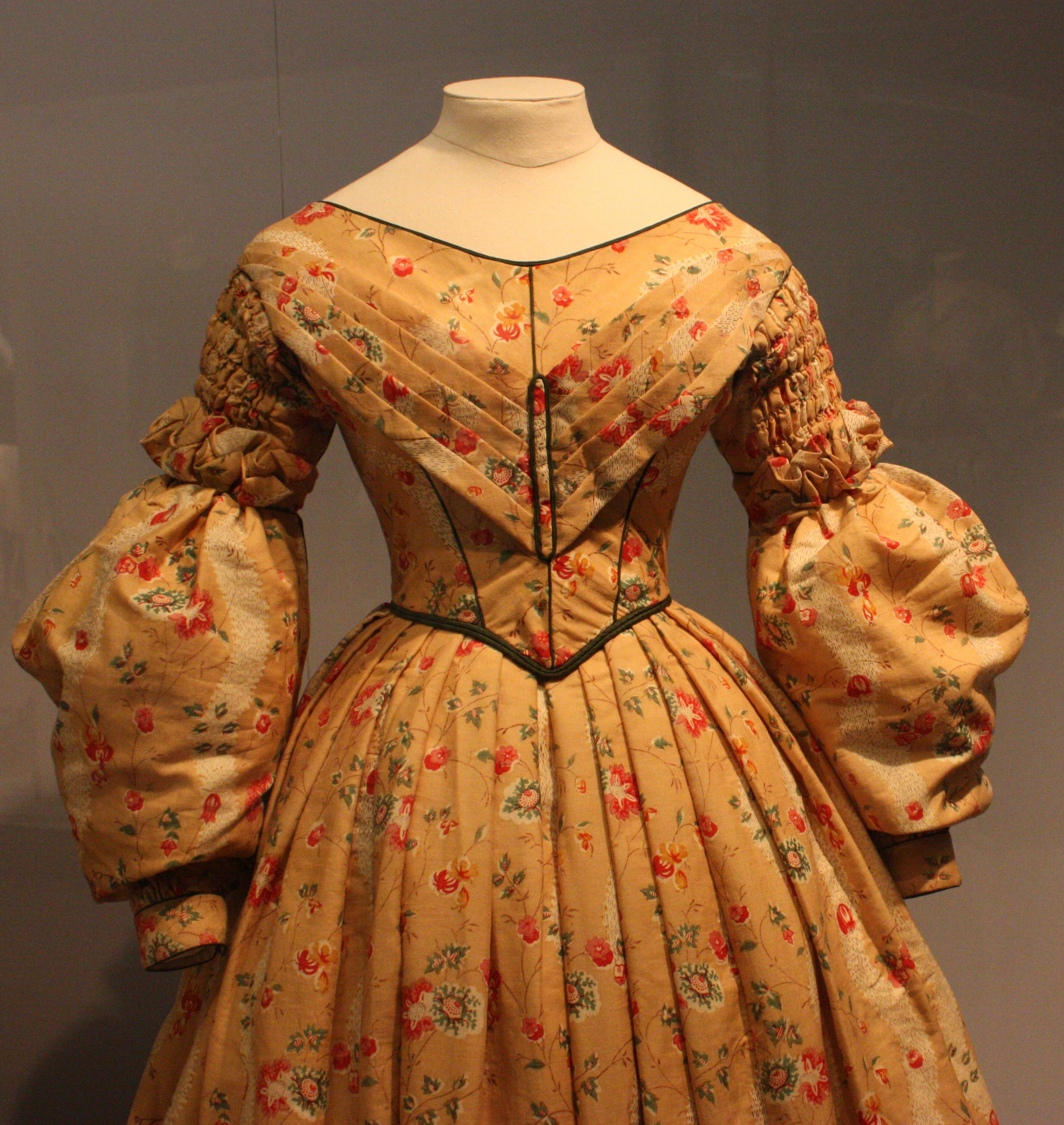
By the later 1830s, fullness was moving from the upper to the lower sleeves. This morning dress of 1836–40 features shirring on the fitted upper sleeves; Victoria and Albert Museum.

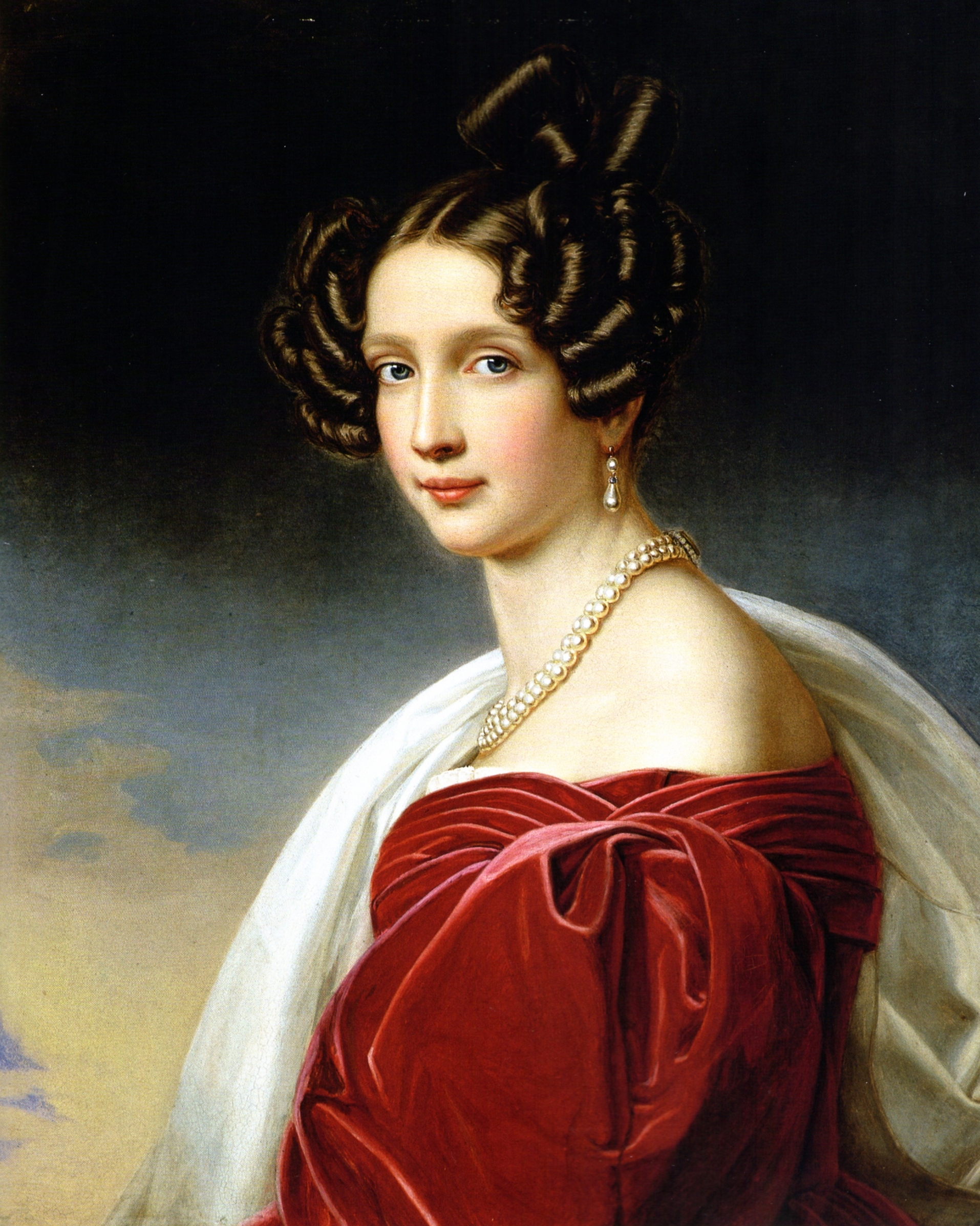
This portrait shows the pleated panels of fabric that trim the gown around the bust and shoulders, and the method of gathering fullness in the large sleeves. 1832.

=== Overview ===
In the 1830s, fashionable women's clothing styles had distinctive large 'leg of mutton' or gigot sleeves, above large full conical skirts, ideally with a narrow, low waist, achieved through a combination of corsetry to restrict the waist and full sleeves and skirts that made the waist appear smaller by comparison. Heavy stiff fabrics such as brocades were fashionable after the aesthetic simplicity of fashion from 1795 to 1820, and many 18th-century gowns were cut up into new garments. There was an emphasis on sloping shoulders and large, full sleeves over much of the arm, with a small cuff at the wrist, which are distinctive to day dresses of the 1830s.

Pelerines, tippets, or lace coverings draped over the shoulders, were popular (one of several garments, along with full upper-arm sleeves and wide necklines, to emphasize the shoulders and their width).

=== Gowns ===
The fashionable feminine figure, with its sloping shoulders, rounded bust, narrow waist and full hips, was emphasized in various ways with the cut and trim of gowns. To about 1835, the small waist was accentuated with a wide belt (a fashion continuing from the 1820s). Later the waist and midriff were unbelted but cut close to the body, and the bodice began to taper to a small point at the front waist. The fashionable corset now had gores to individually cup the breasts, and the bodice was styled to emphasize this shape.

Gowns had very wide necklines and short, puffed sleeves reaching to the elbow from a dropped shoulder, and were worn with mid-length gloves. The width at the shoulder was often emphasized by gathered or pleated panels of fabric arranged horizontally over the bust and around the shoulders.

Morning dresses generally had high necklines, and shoulder width was emphasized with tippets or wide collars that rested on the gigot sleeves. Summer afternoon dresses might have wide, low necklines similar to gowns, but with long sleeves. Skirts were pleated into the waistband of the bodice, and held out with starched petticoats of linen or cotton.

Prior to 1835, fashionable skirts could be worn at ankle-length, but as the decade continued this fell out of fashion.

=== Hairstyles and Headgear ===
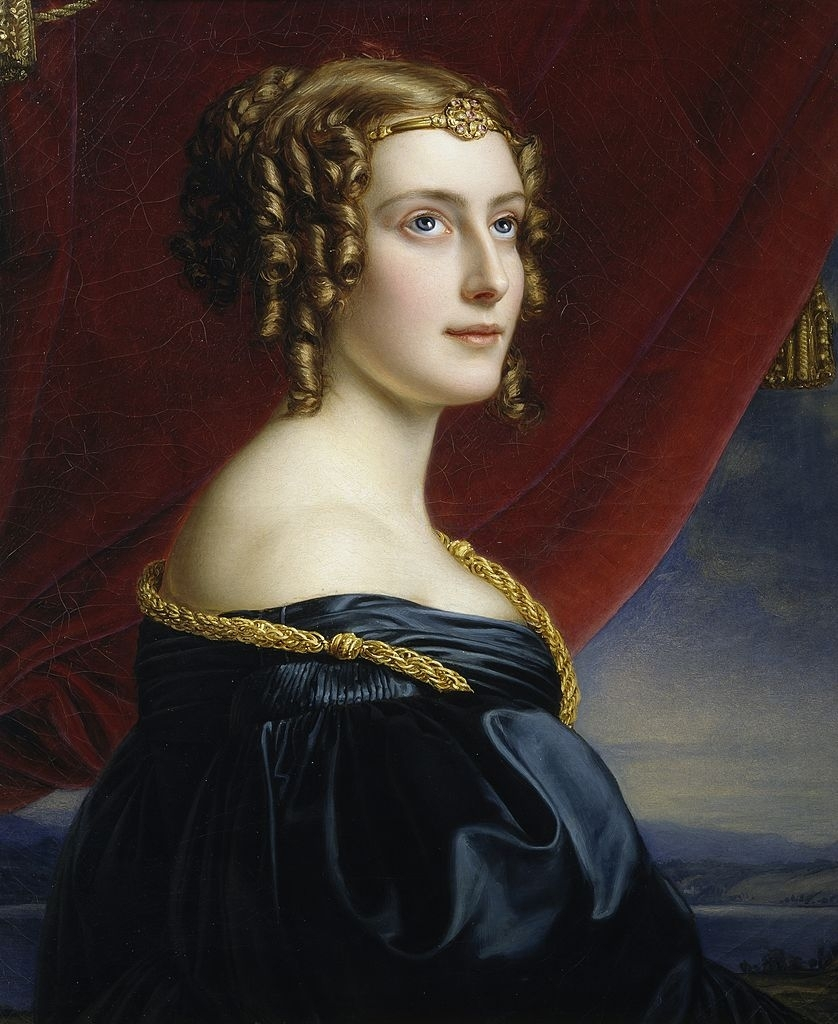
Jane Digby wears her hair in corkscrew curls on the sides. The back of her hair is braided and pinned to her head, 1831.

Early 1830s hair was parted in the center and dressed in elaborate curls, loops and knots extending out to both sides and up from the crown of the head. Braids were fashionable, and were likewise looped over either ear and gathered into a topknot.

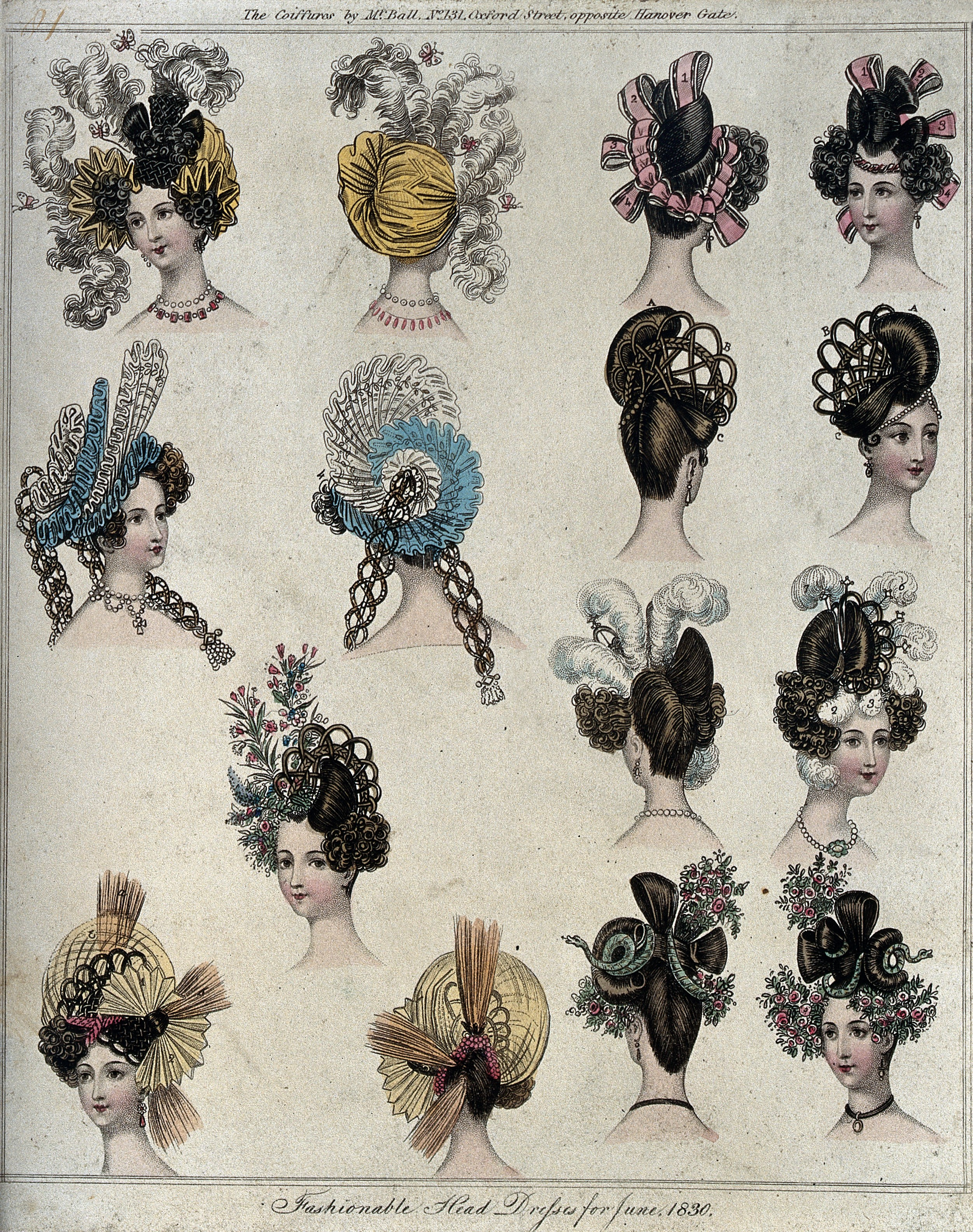
Fashionable head-dresses and hair accessories, 1830.

Bonnets with wide semicircular brims framed the face for street wear, and were heavily decorated with trim, ribbons, and feathers.

Married women wore a linen or cotton cap for daywear, trimmed with lace, ribbon, and frills, and tied under the chin. The cap was worn alone indoors and under the bonnet for street wear.

For evening wear, hair ornaments including combs, ribbons, flowers, and jewels were worn; other options included berets and turbans.

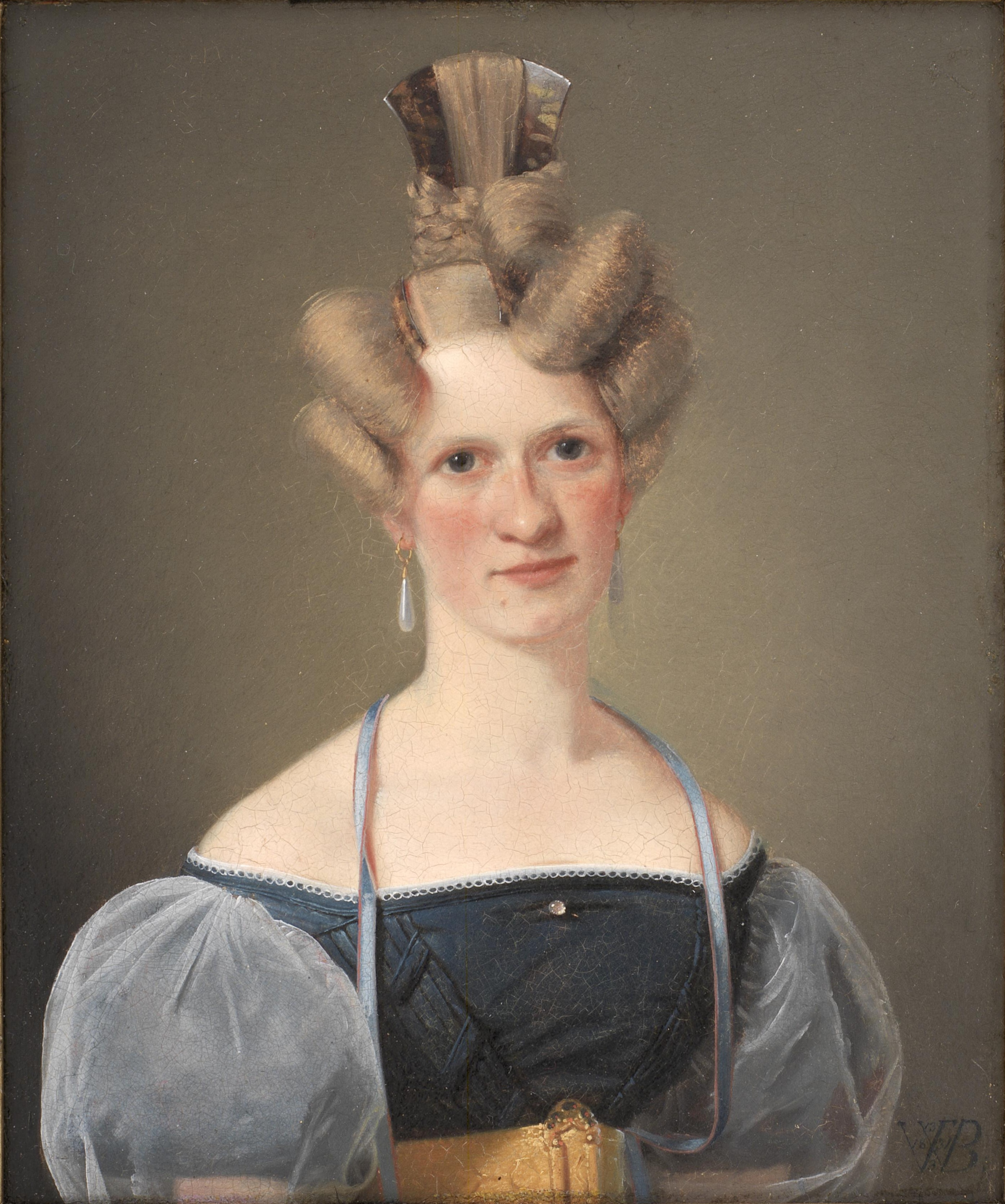
Marie Raffenberg wears her hair with curls and a high topknot, 1831.

In the Río de la Plata cities of Buenos Aires and Montevideo, the fashion for peinetones—which was unique to the region—became immensely popular. Although its origin can be traced back to the traditional Spanish peineta comb, the peinetón derived into a different headpiece altogether, both for its physical characteristics as well as for the symbolic meanings around its use. They were defined by their extravagant size, measuring up to 120 centimetres (3 feet 11 inches) in height and width at the height of their popularity. The use of the peinetón was a local addition to the over-the-top fashion of the Romantic era that characterized Western fashion of the period.

=== Undergarments ===
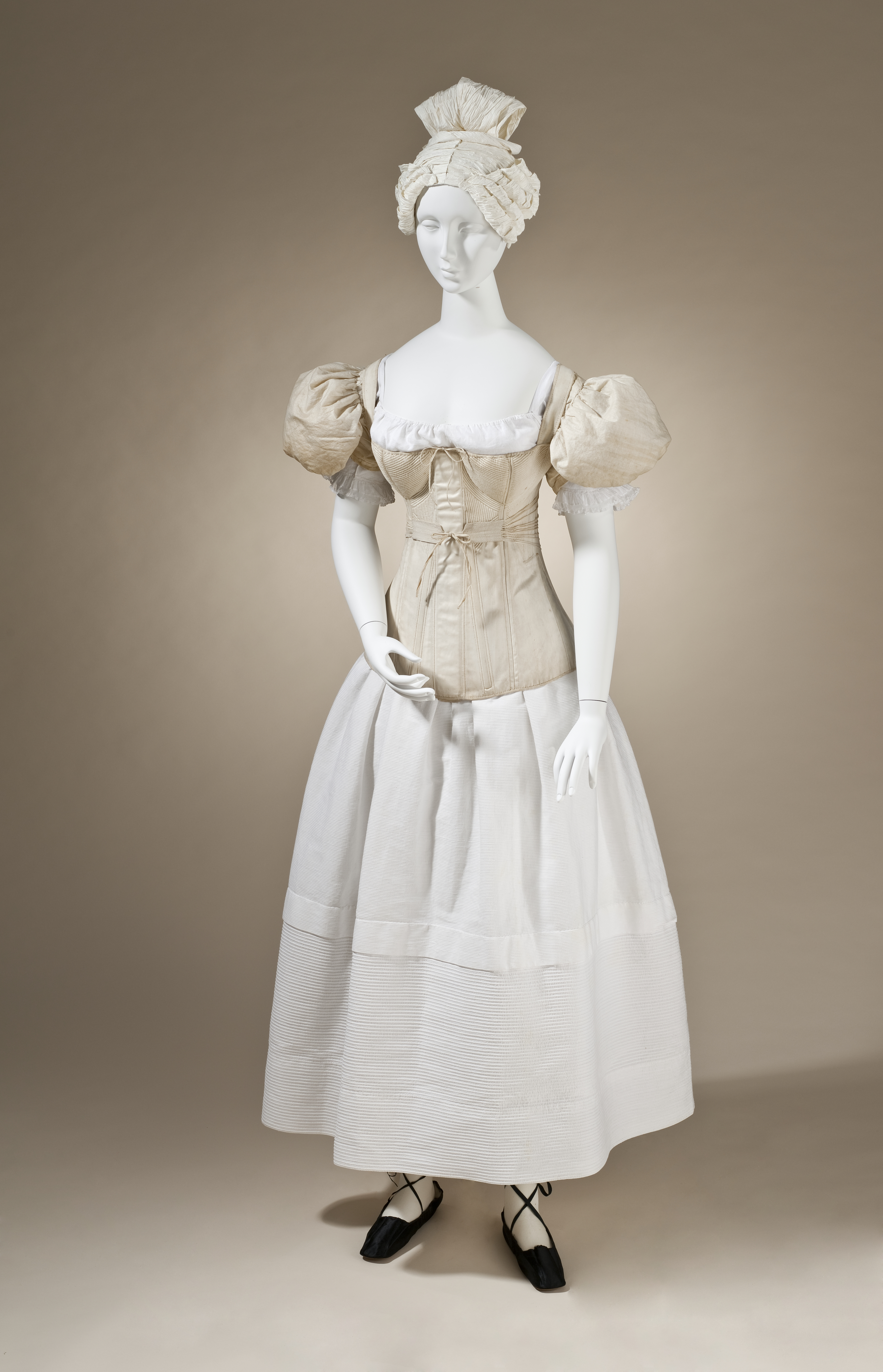
Sleeve plumpers, corset, chemise and petticoat of the 1830s, Los Angeles County Museum of Art.

Women's undergarments consisted of a knee-length linen chemise with straight, elbow length sleeves. Corsets compressed the waist and skirts were held in shape by layers of starched petticoats, stiffened with tucks and cording. The full sleeves were supported by down-filled sleeve plumpers.

=== Outerwear ===
Riding habits consisted of a high-necked, tight-waisted jacket with the fashionable dropped shoulder and huge gigot sleeves, worn over a tall-collared shirt or chemisette, with a long matching petticoat or skirt. Tall top hats with veils were worn.

Shawls were worn with short-sleeved evening gowns early in the decade, but they were not suited to the wide gigot sleeves of the mid-1830s.

Full-length mantles were worn to about 1836, when mantles became shorter. A mantlet or shawl-mantlet was a shaped garment like a cross between a shawl and a mantle, with points hanging down in front. The burnous was a three-quarter length mantle with a hood, named after the similar garment of Arabia. The paletot was knee-length, with three cape-collars and slits for the arms, and the pardessus was half or three-quarter length coat with a defined waist and sleeves.

For evening, voluminous mantles of velvet or satin, with fur trim or fur linings in cold climates, were worn with the gown.

=== Footwear ===
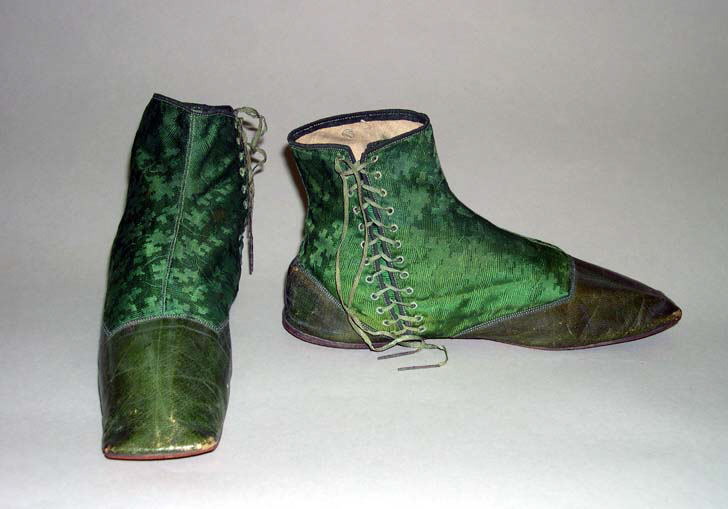
Shoes made of silk and leather, 1830s.

Low, square-toed slippers were made of fabric or leather for daytime and of satin for evening wear. Low boots with elastic insets appeared in this decade.

=== Style gallery 1830–1835 ===
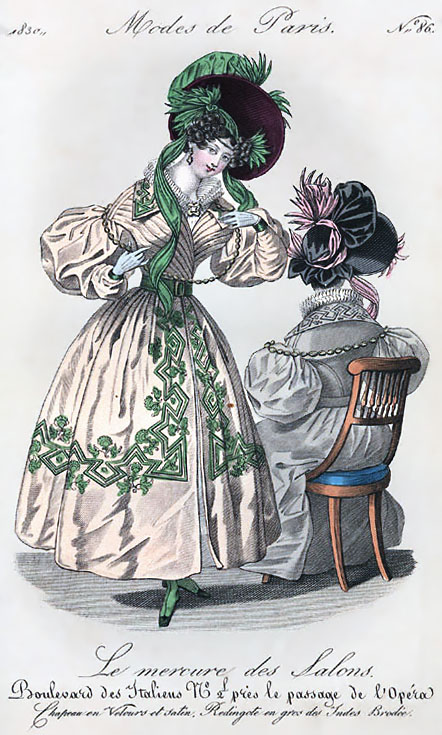
1 – 1830

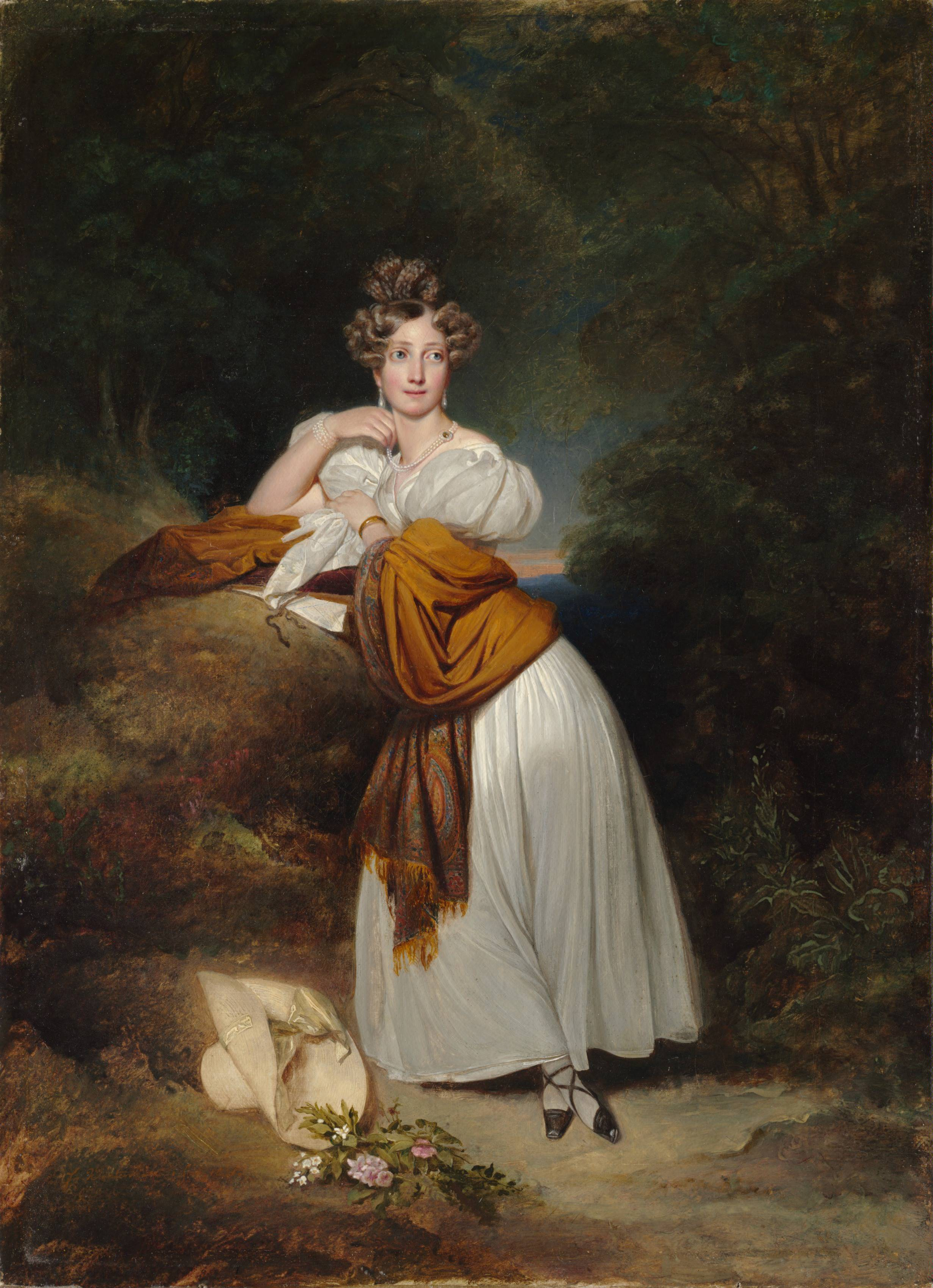
2 – 1831

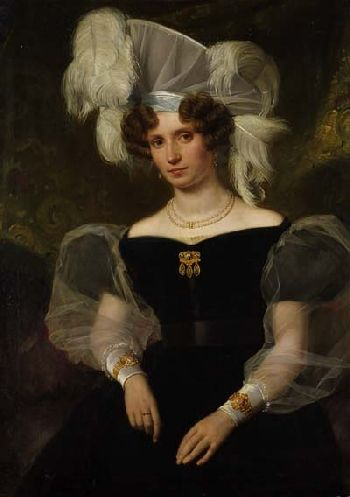
3 – 1831

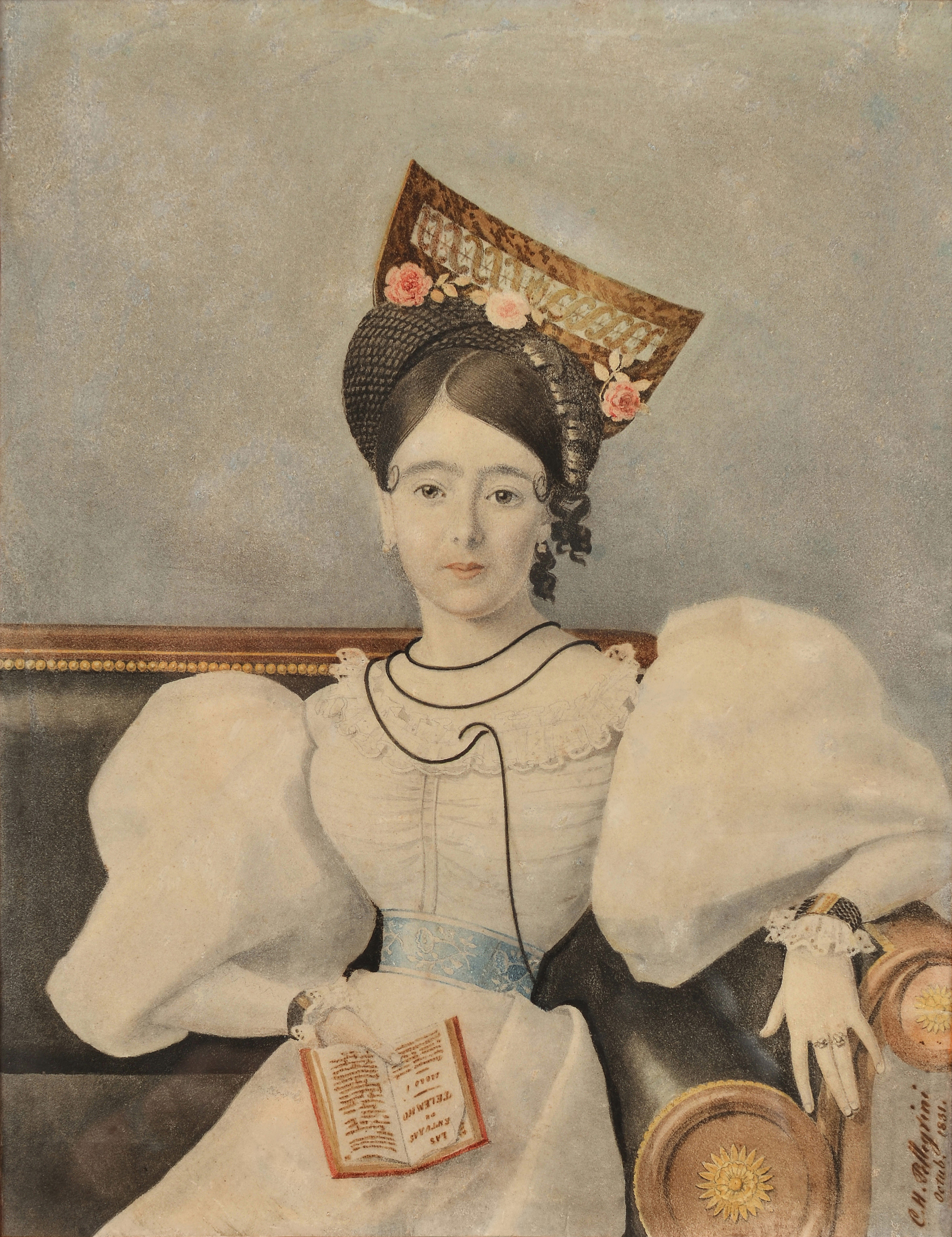
4 - 1831

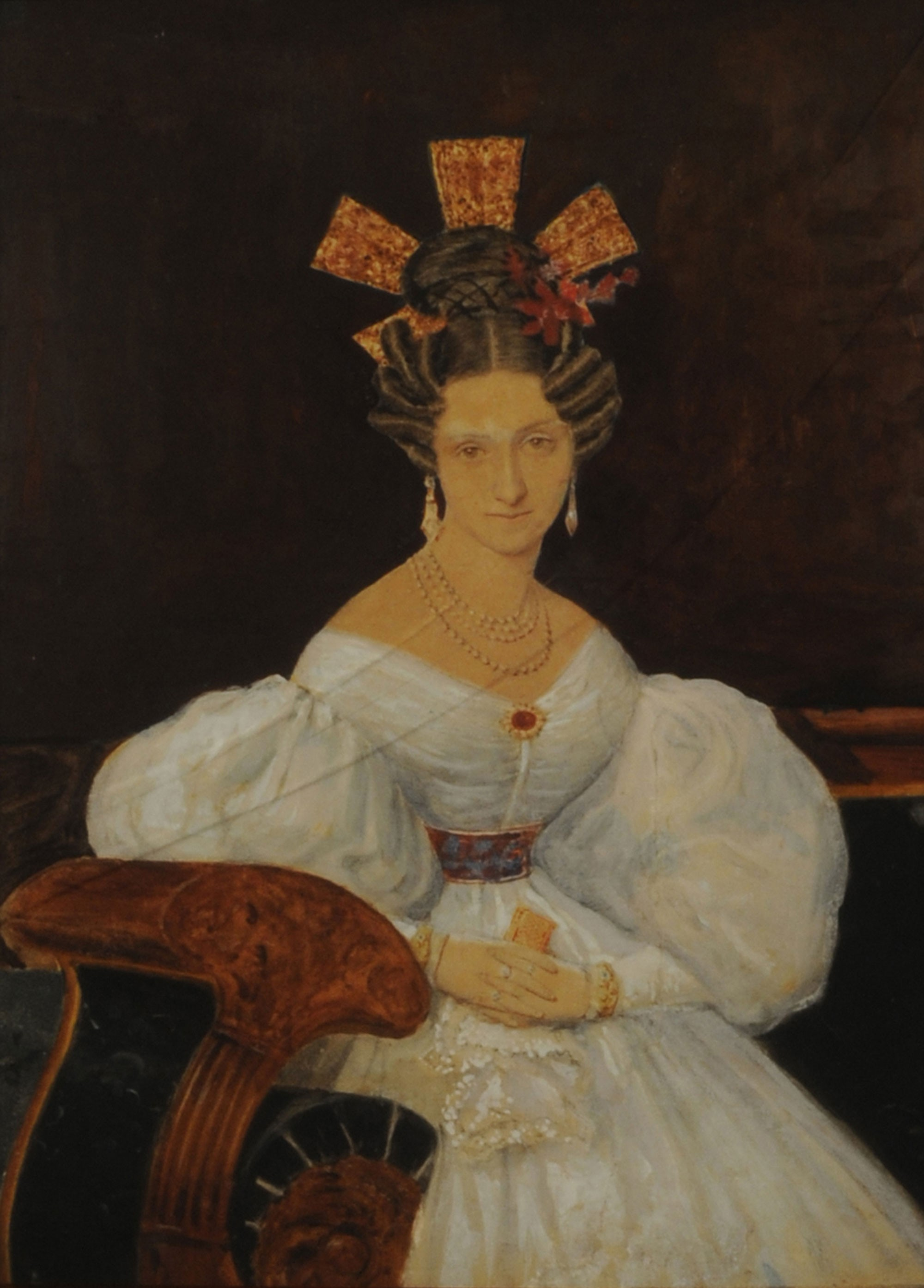
5 – 1830s

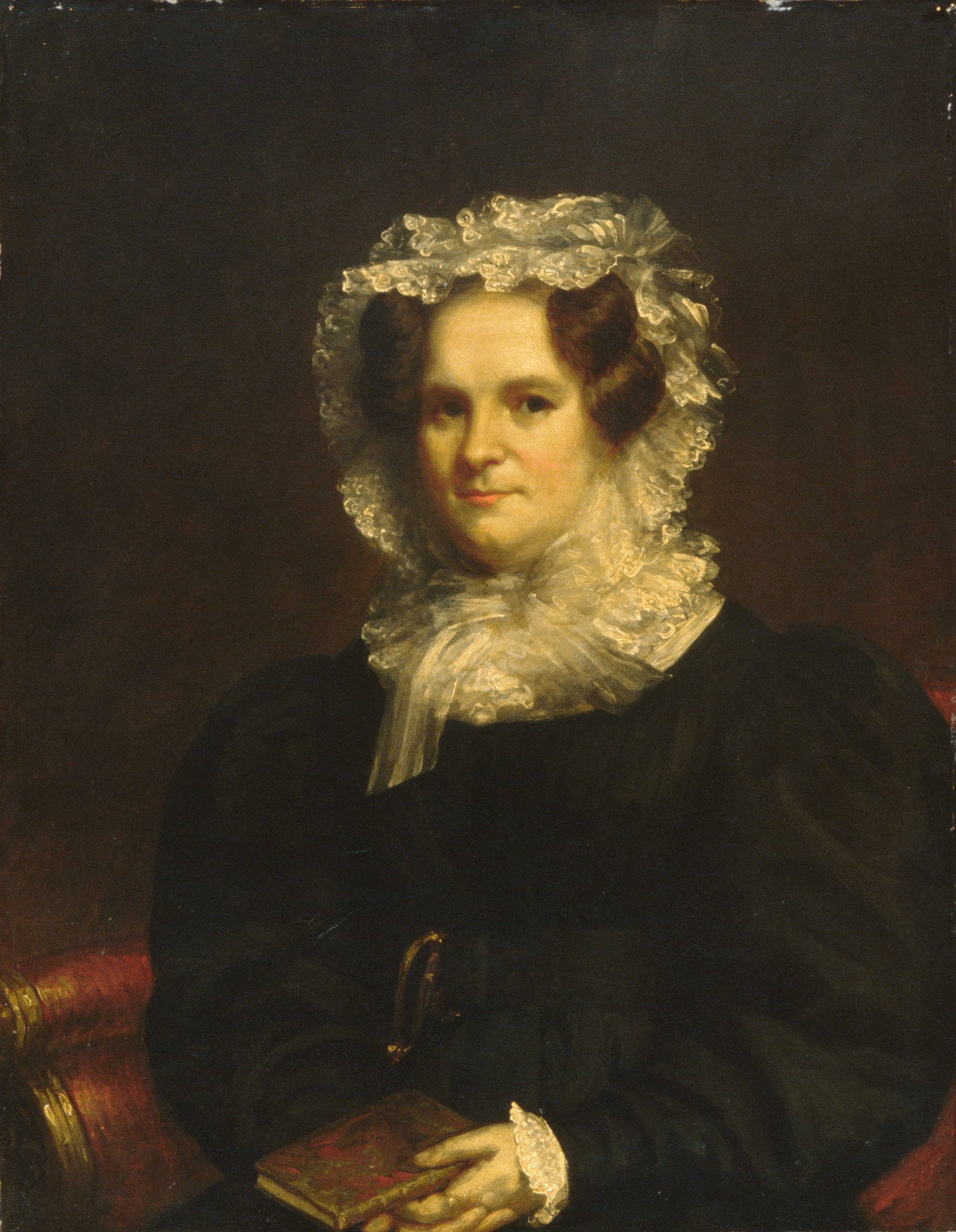
6 – 1831–32

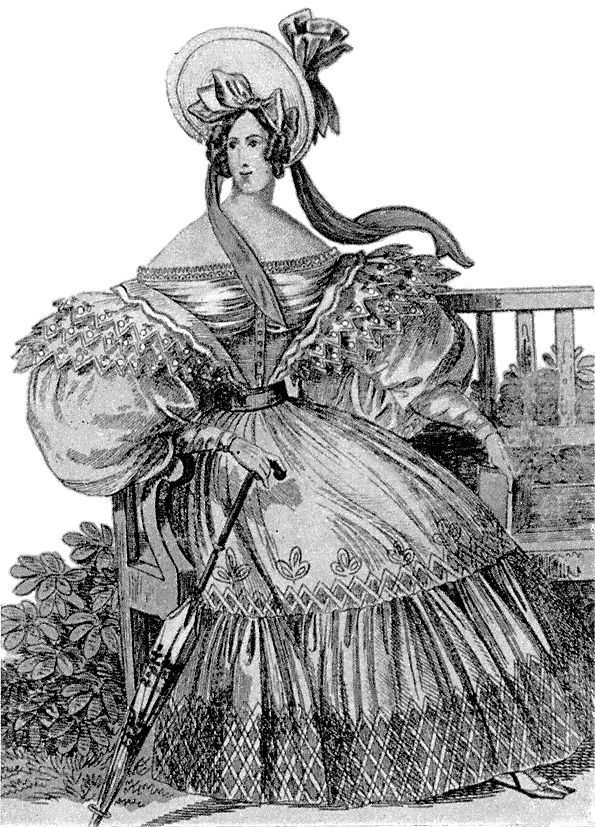
7 – 1832

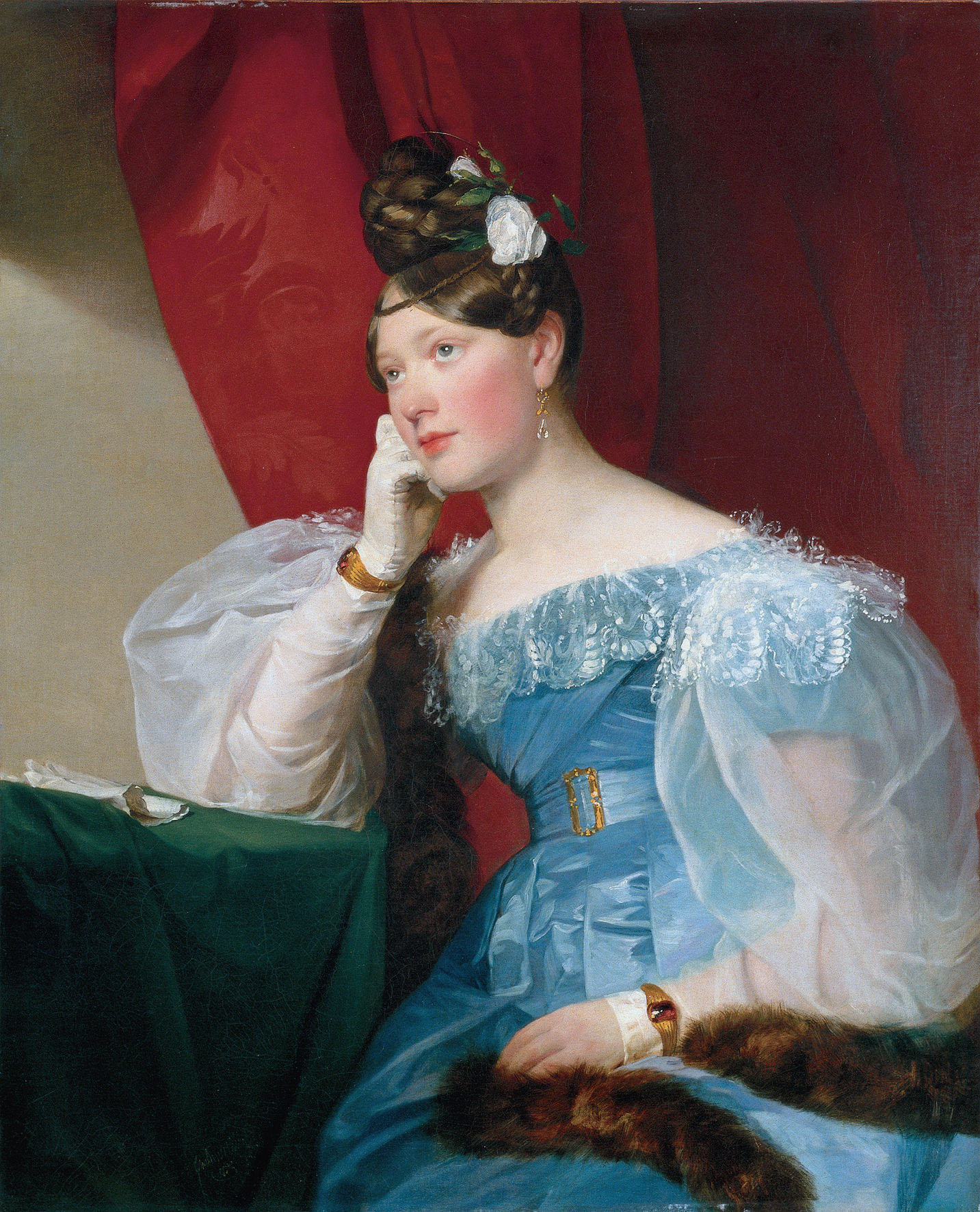
8 – 1832

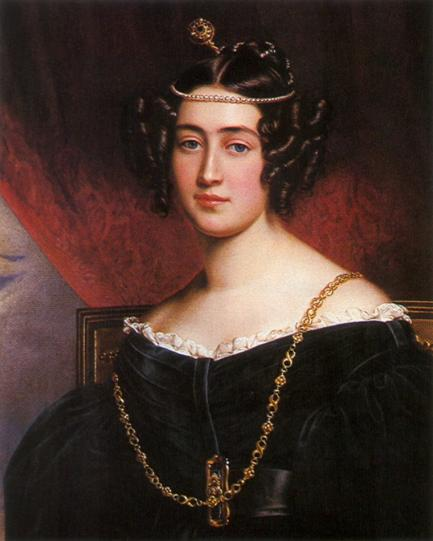
9 – 1834

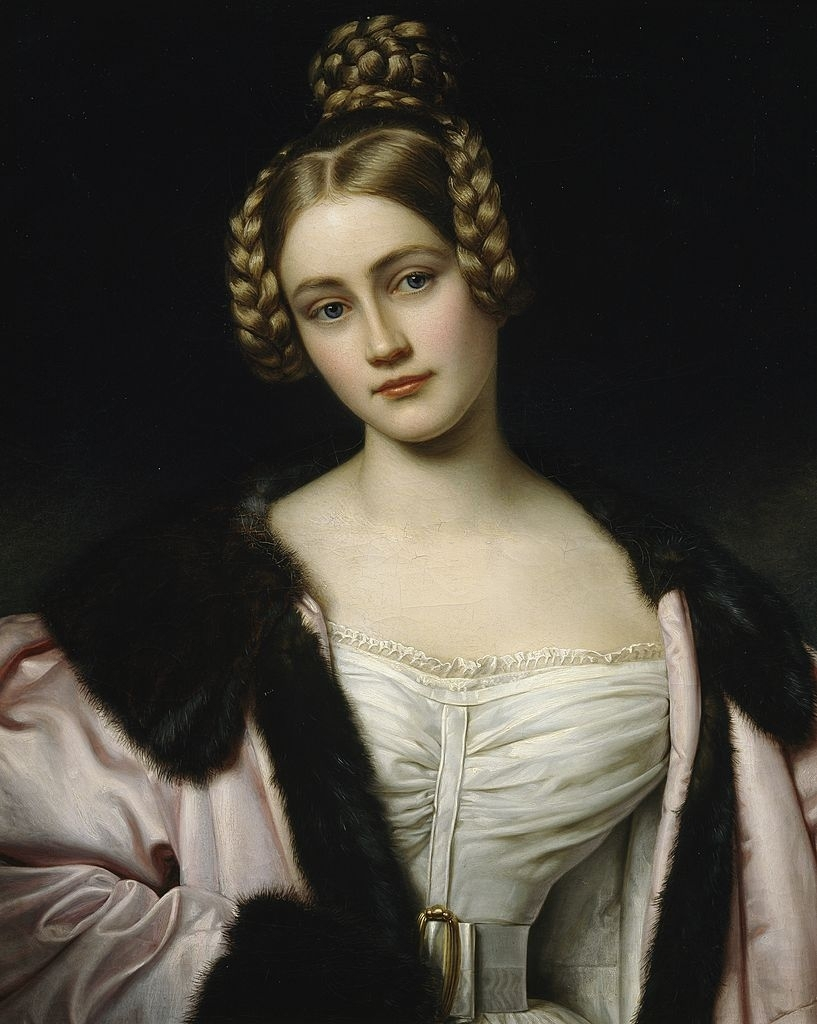
10 – 1834

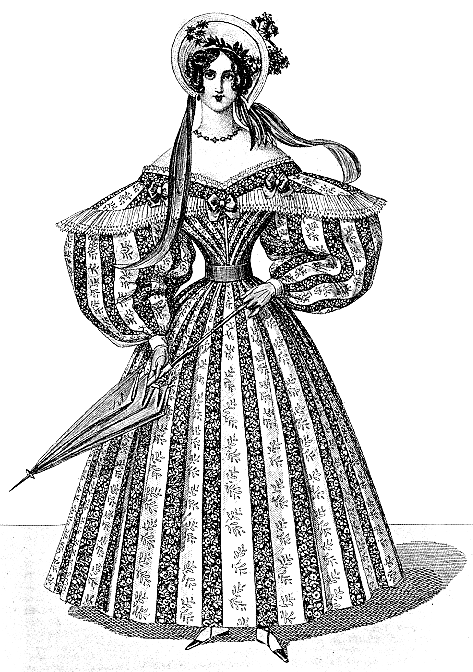
11 – 1835

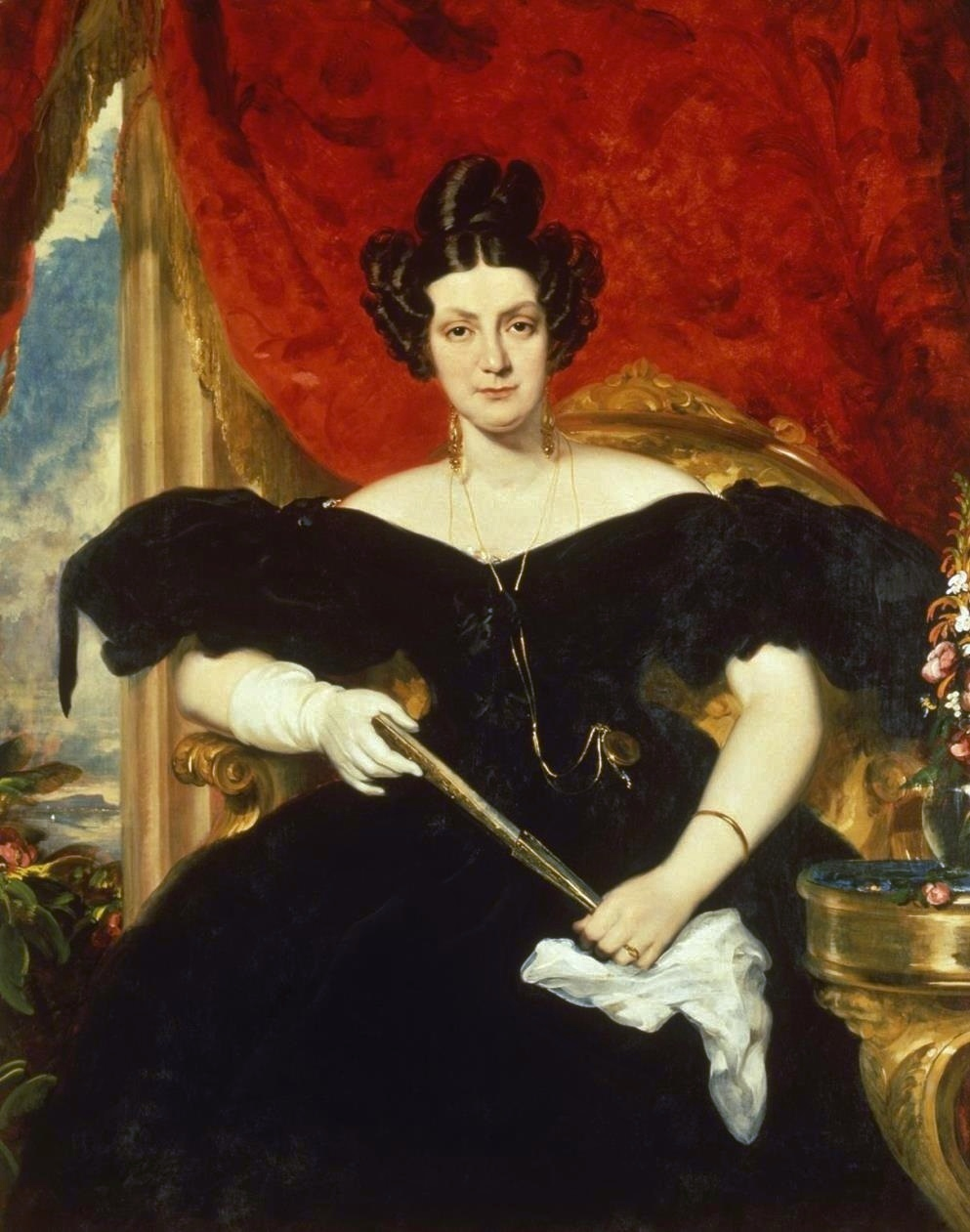
12 – 1830s

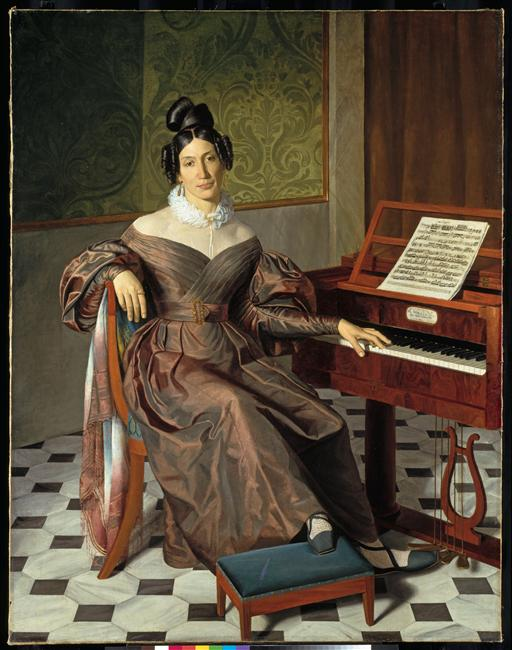
13 - 1835

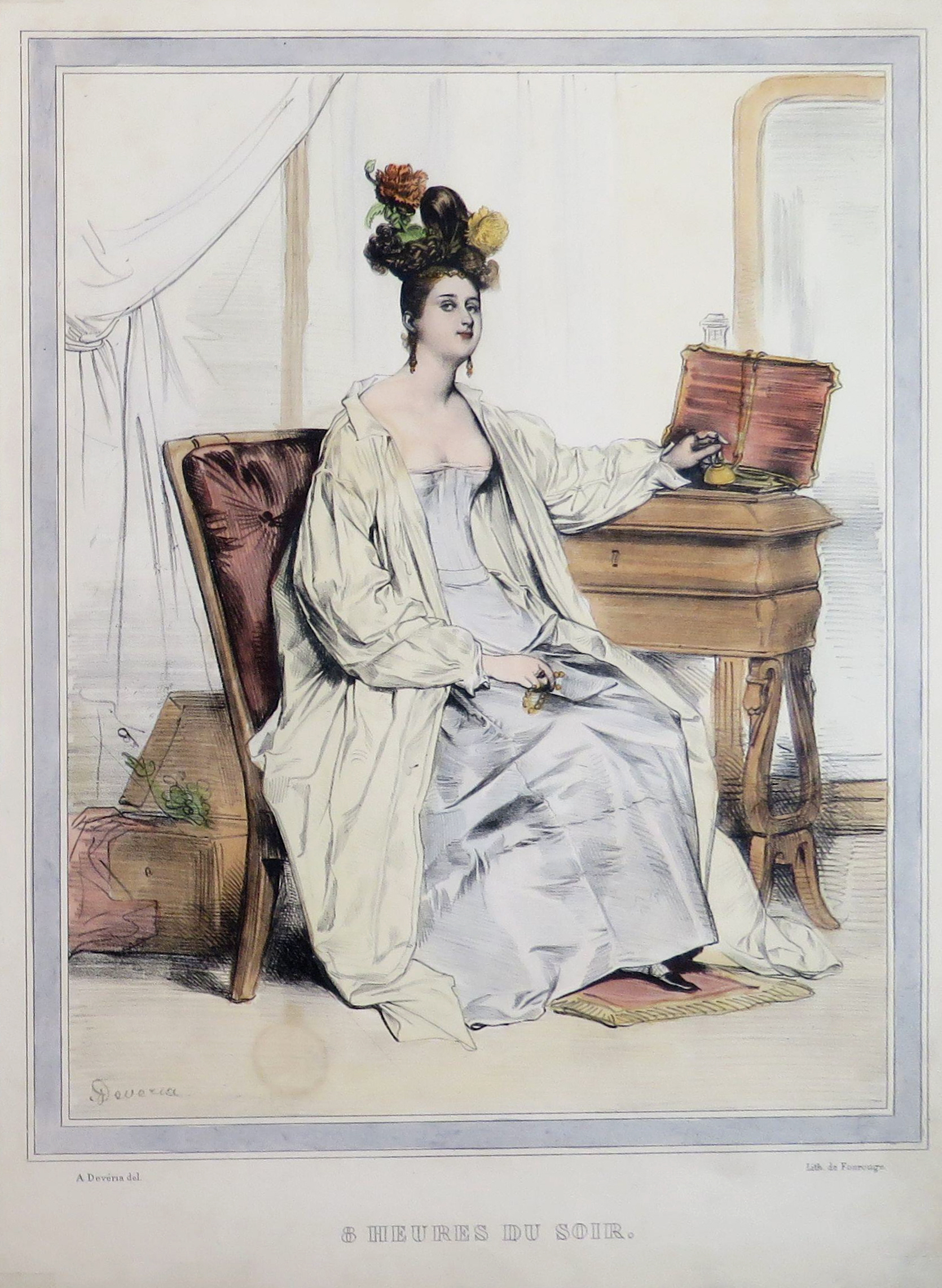
14 - ca 1835
1. Fashion plate from Mercure des Salons
2. Sophie Guillemette, Grand Duchess of Baden wears a white gown that just skims her ankles and a tawny-colored shawl. Her flat shoes have ribbon laces and square toes. 1831.
3. Therese von Schenk wears long sheer oversleeves over short puffed sleeves and an elaborate fabric-covered hat with plumes, 1831.
4. Lucia Carranza de Rodríguez Orey, elite woman from Buenos Aires, wears a peinetón and a pale dress with large sleeves, a small waist and a leather cord around her neck.
5. Manuela Suárez Lastra de Garmendia, elite woman from Buenos Aires, wears a gown with gigot sleeves and a small waist, multiple jewelry and an elaborate hairstyle.
6. Mrs. Edward Kellogg wears the frilled indoor day cap of a married woman with a wide ribbon bow tied under her chin. Her simple dark gown has gigot sleeves and a modestly broad neckline, filled in with a ruffed chemisette.
7. Fashion plate from Wiener Moden, in which anatomical accuracy gives way to the desire to present a trendy fashion silhouette. The day dress has a wide, low neckline and long sleeves.
8. Julie von Woyna wears a blue silk dress, with sheer sleeves and sheer lace trimmings . Her plaited hair is setup in an elaborate hairstyle.
9. Marquise Irene of Pallavicini of 1834 with echoes of the Renaissance: a wide-necked black gown features a tight belt at the raised waistline. Hair is worn in elaborate curls and knots.
10. Caroline, Countess of Holnstein wears her hair severely parted in the center front and across the top of her head. Her long hair is braided, and the braids are looped over either ear and wound into a knot at the crown of her head. She wears a white gown with a wide belt and gathers at the front to emphasise the bust under a pink satin coat with a fur collar and fur trim. German, 1834.
11. Fashion plate from Wiener Zeitschrift shows the fashion for fabrics printed with combinations of stripes and floral designs.
12. Eugénia, Duchess of Palmela wears a black gown with short, puffed sleeves and mid-length gloves. Her hair is dressed in elaborate curls and a looped braid is gathered into a topknot.
13. Isabella Colbran, wife of Gioachino Rossini wears a brown silk dress with puffed sleeves, and low square-toed slippers.
14. Undergarments, corset, petticoat and dressing gown, ca 1835.

=== Style gallery 1835–1839 ===
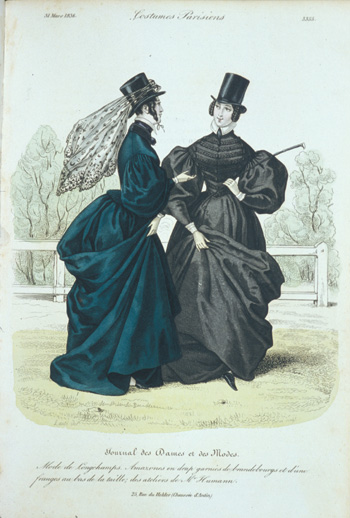
1 – 1830s

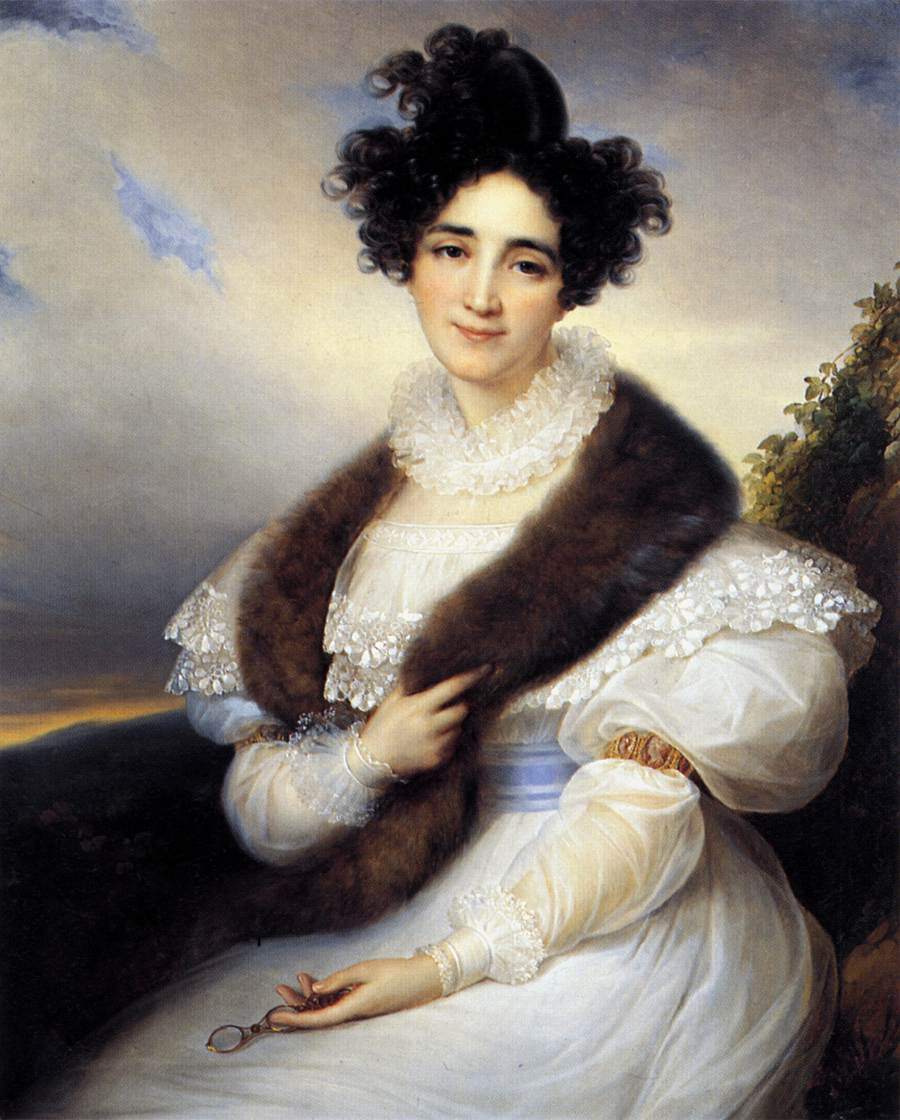
2 – 1835

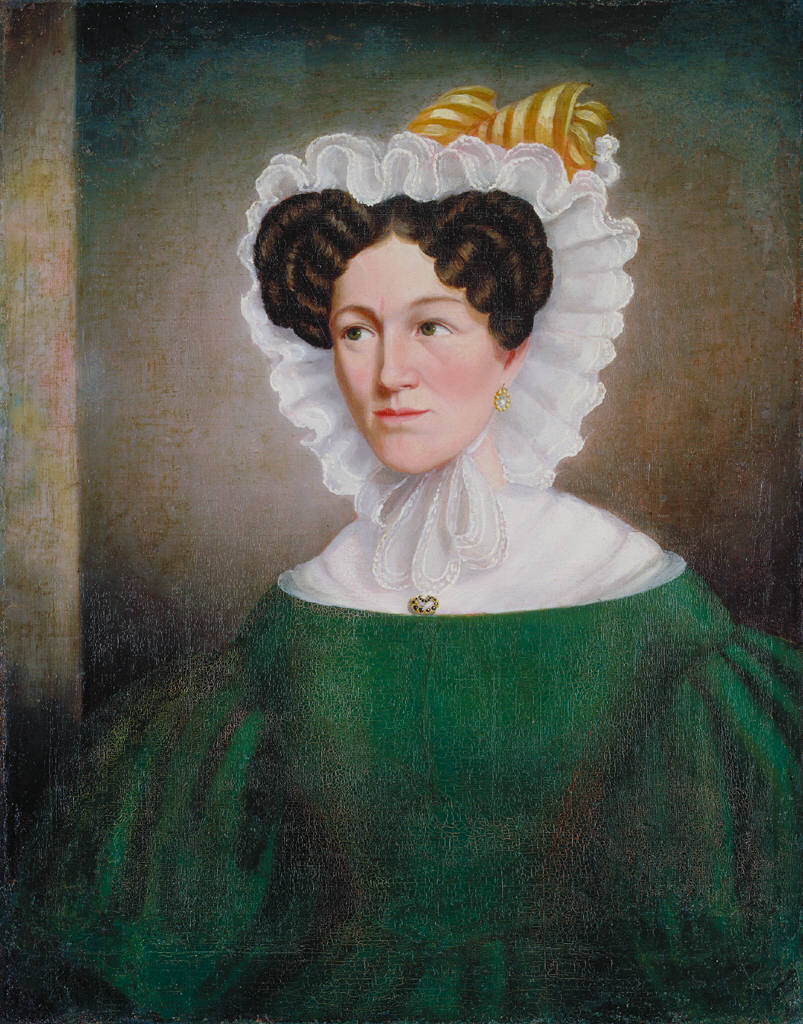
3 – 1834–36

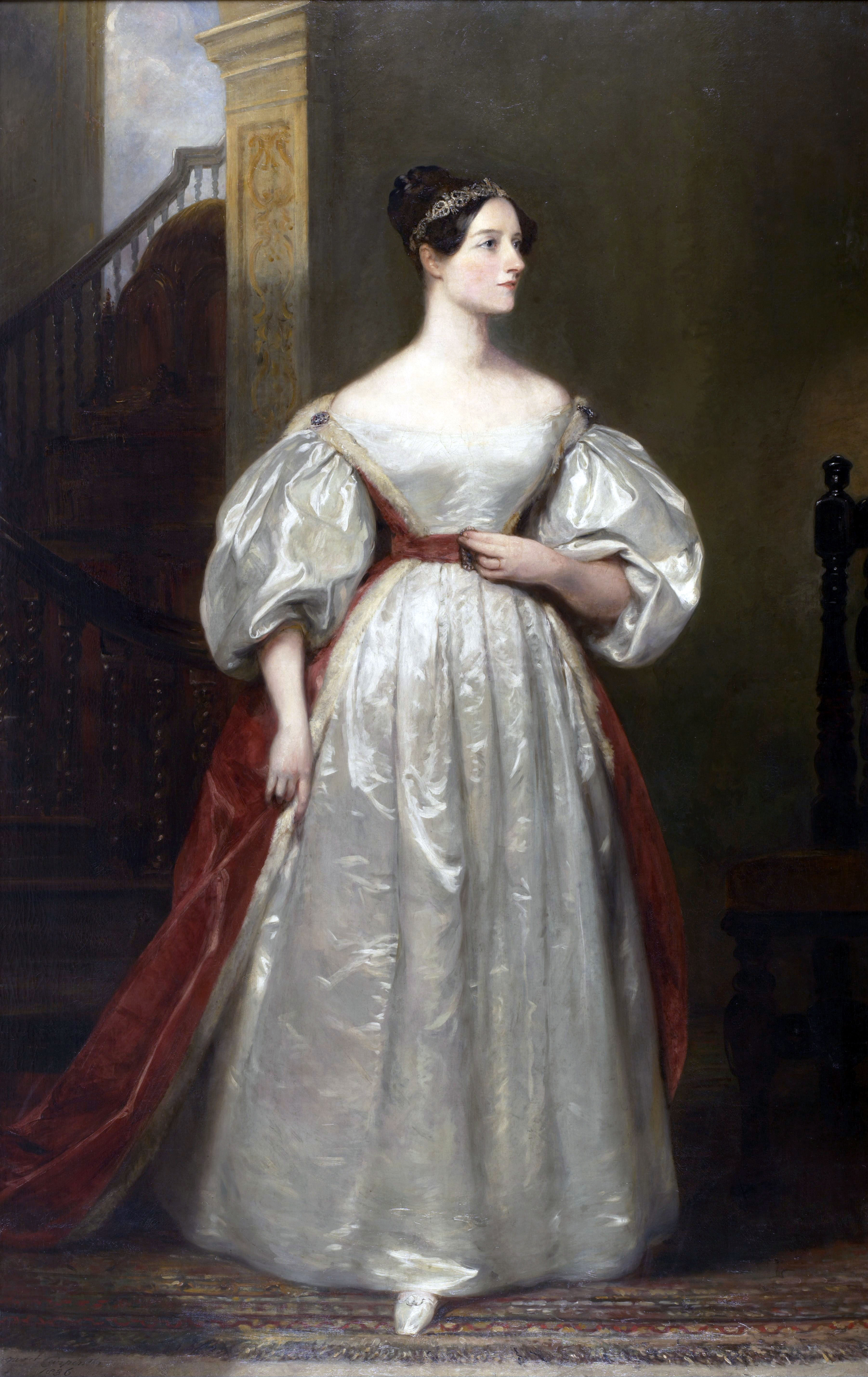
4 – 1836

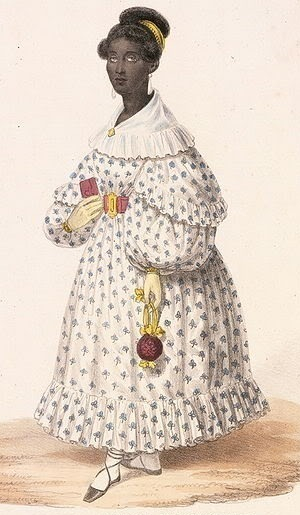
5 —1836

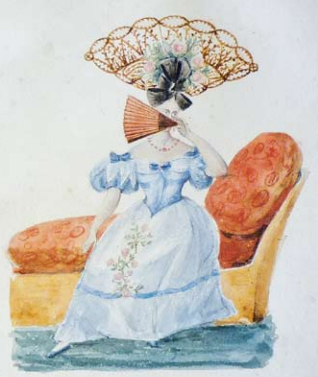
6 — 1836

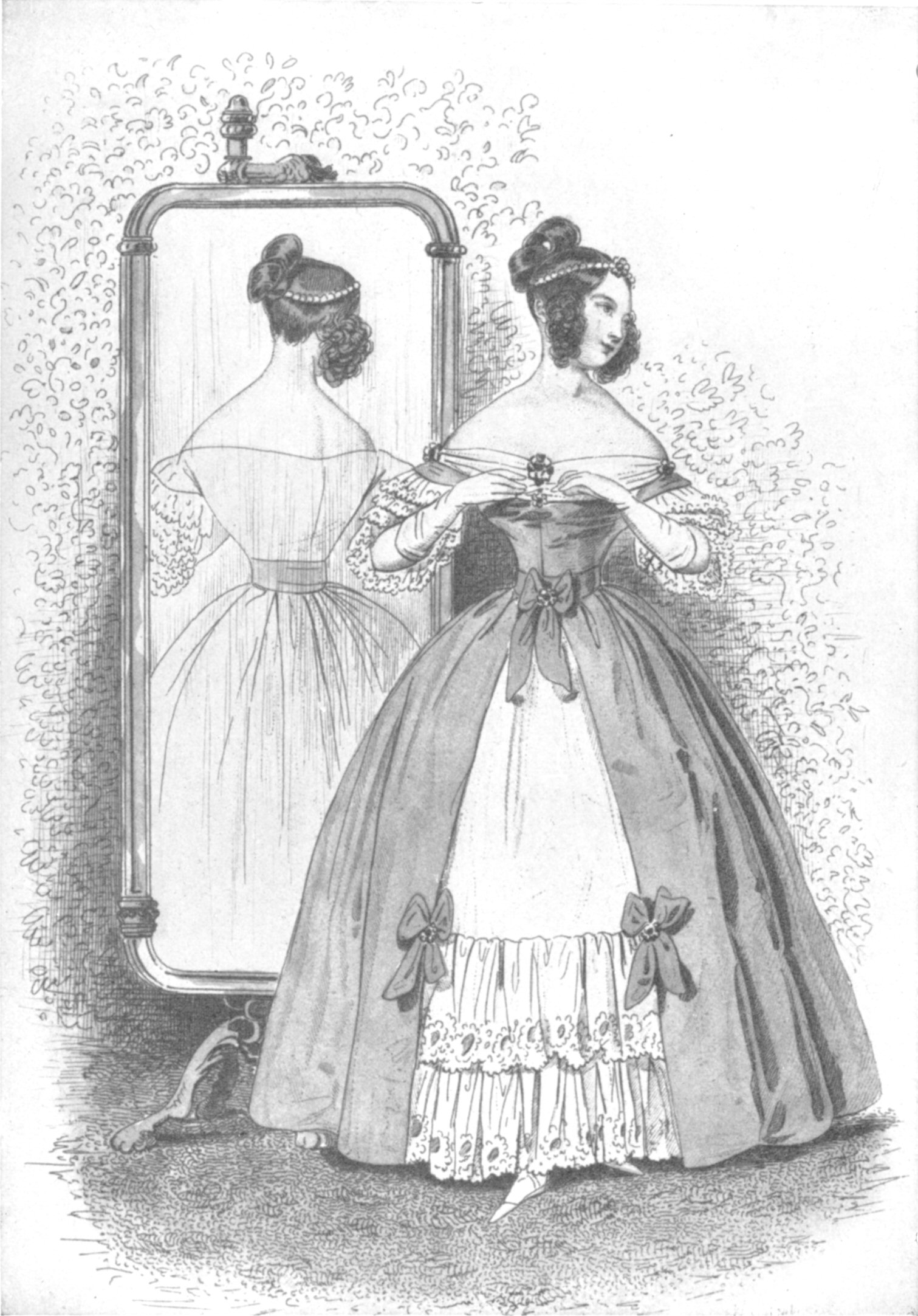
7 – 1837

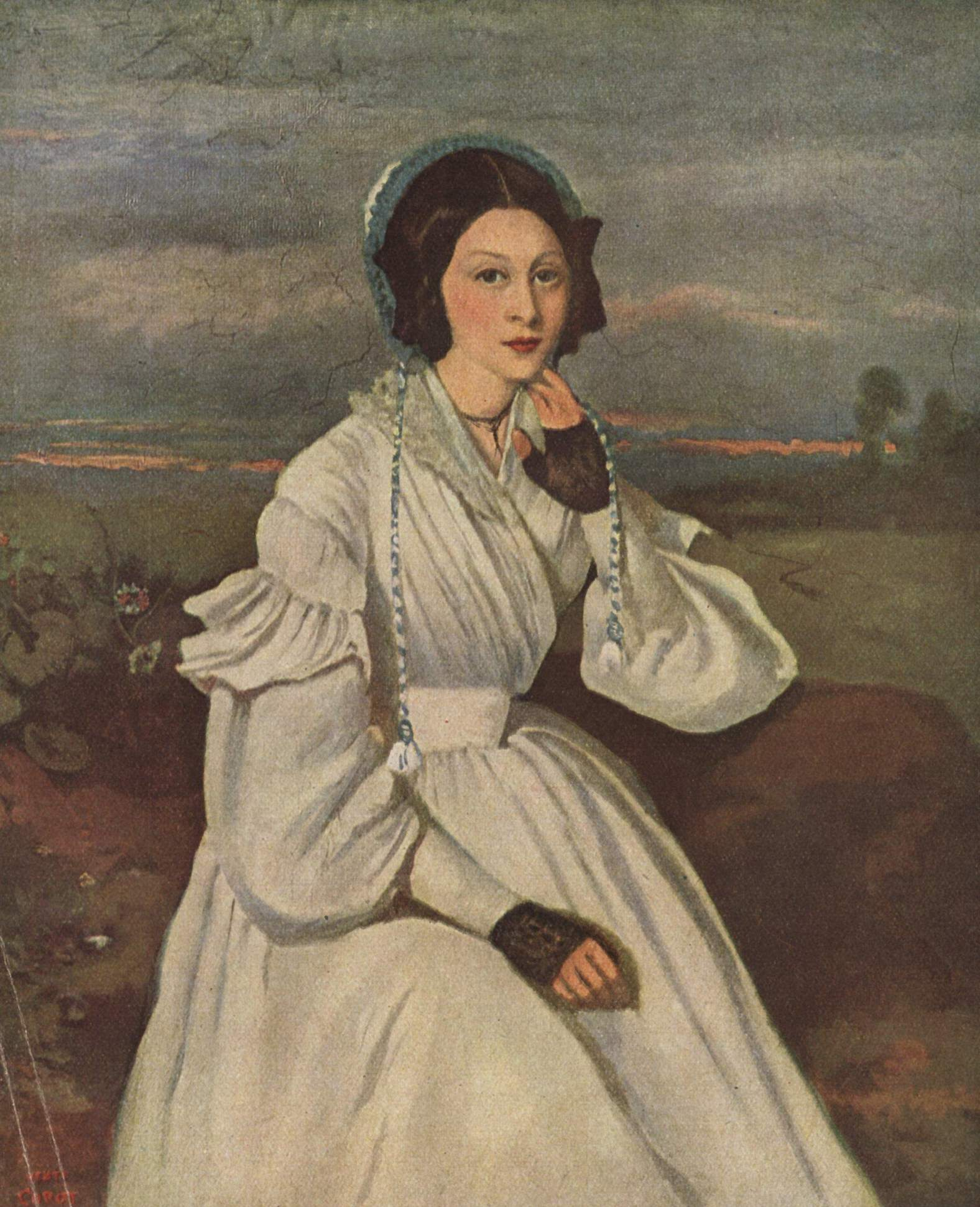
8 -1837

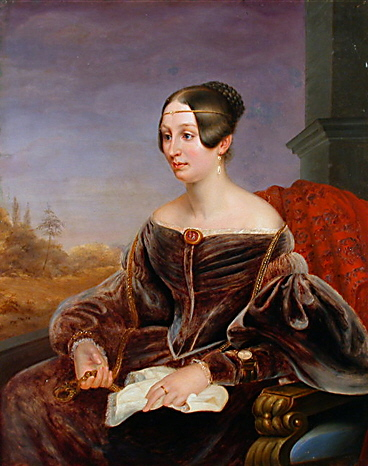
9 – 1837

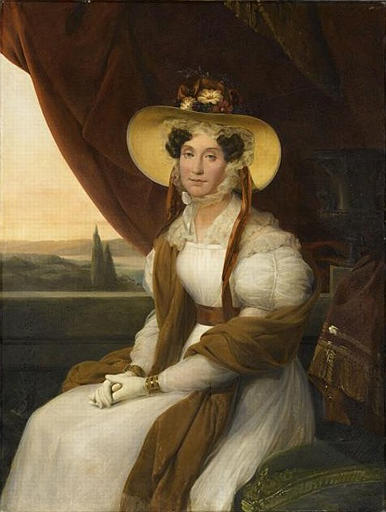
10 – 1838

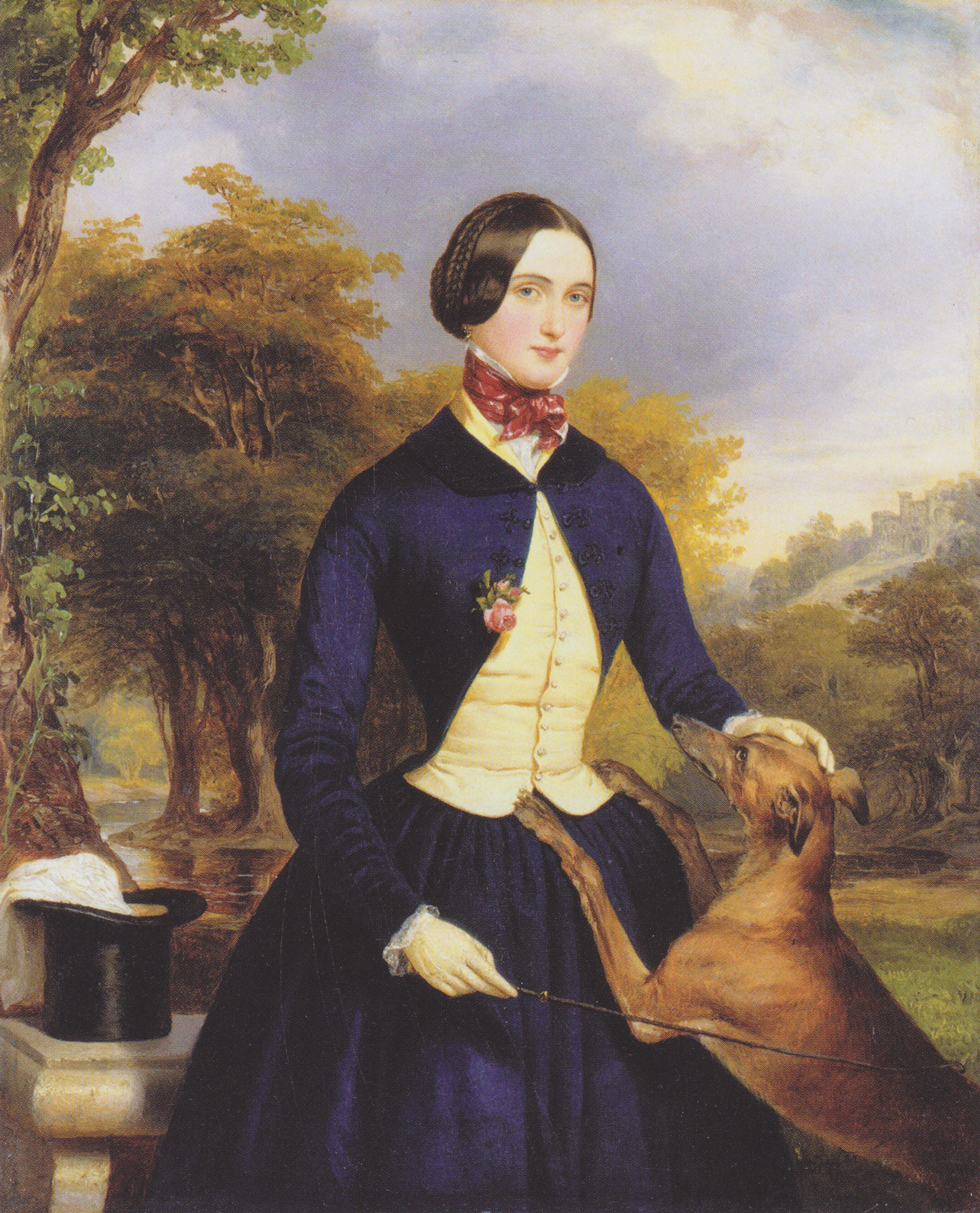
11 – 1839
1. 1830s Riding habits with fashionable full sleeves.
2. Marie Lafont-Porcher's hair is styled in a high knot with wide side-curls; her gauzy gown has a neck ruff and a wide collar, and she wears a fur piece similar to that in the Gazette des Salons fashion plate above, 1835.
3. Conservative, middle-class fashion: Eliza Clarke Cory Clench wears a white cap with a large striped ribbon bow that contrasts with her bright green dress. Canada, 1834–36.
4. Portrait of Ada Lovelace in British court dress. She wears a red train over a white satin gown. Note her square-toed satin slippers, 1836.
5. African-American crossdresser Peter Sewally, of debated gender identity, 1836.
6. Painting by Henri S. Benoit Darondeau depicting the typical evening wear of a woman from Montevideo, including a pale blue dress with large, voluminous sleves and decorated with ribbons. She has the typical peinetón on her head and covers her face with a hand fan.
7. Viennese fashion plate for February 1837 shows front and back views of the newly fashionable dangling clusters of curls on the sides worn with an ornate knot of hair at the crown. A headband is worn for evening. The waist is still defined by a wide belt, but it sits lower on the body.
8. By 1837, fullness was dropping from just off the shoulder to the middle of the arm. The bonnet is smaller than those worn earlier in the decade, and black lace mitts (fingerless gloves) are worn with the white day dress. Hair is worn in wide clusters of short sausage curls. French.
9. Mathilde, Gräfin Lynar wears a brown velvet gown with snug shoulders and lower sleeves, and fullness at the middle of the arm. The waist is darted to fit and comes to a small point in front. Hair is smoothed above the ears and wound into a braided crown. German, 1837.
10. Adélaide d'Orléans wears a heavily decorated straw bonnet over a frilled cap, 1838.
11. Young woman in riding habit inspired by contemporary men's fashion, 1839.

=== Caricature gallery ===
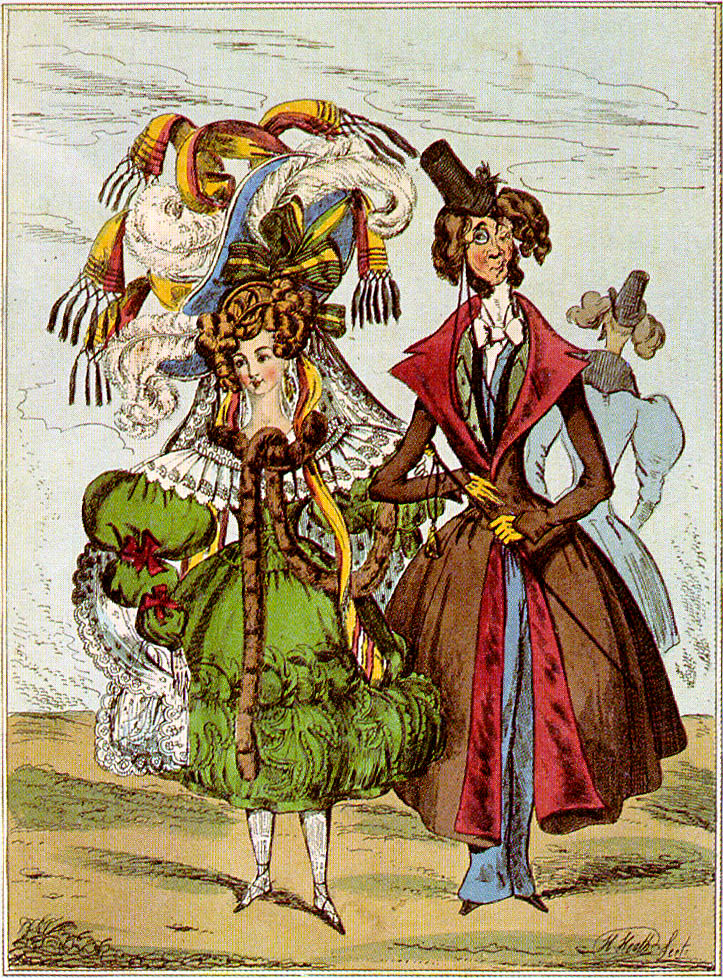
"Waist and Extravagance," c. 1830 fashion satire.

=== Dresses on display ===
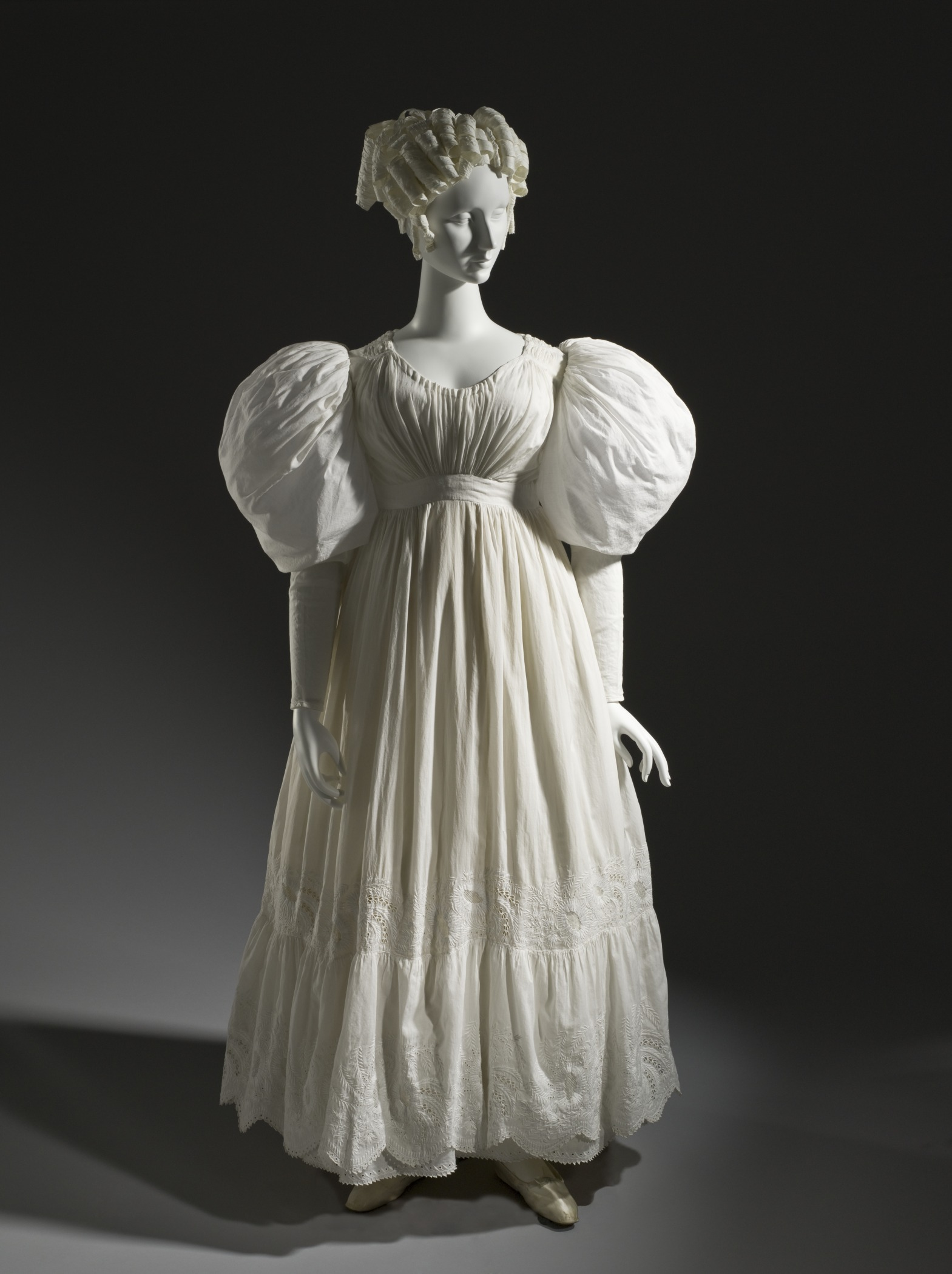
White summer dress, c. 1830.

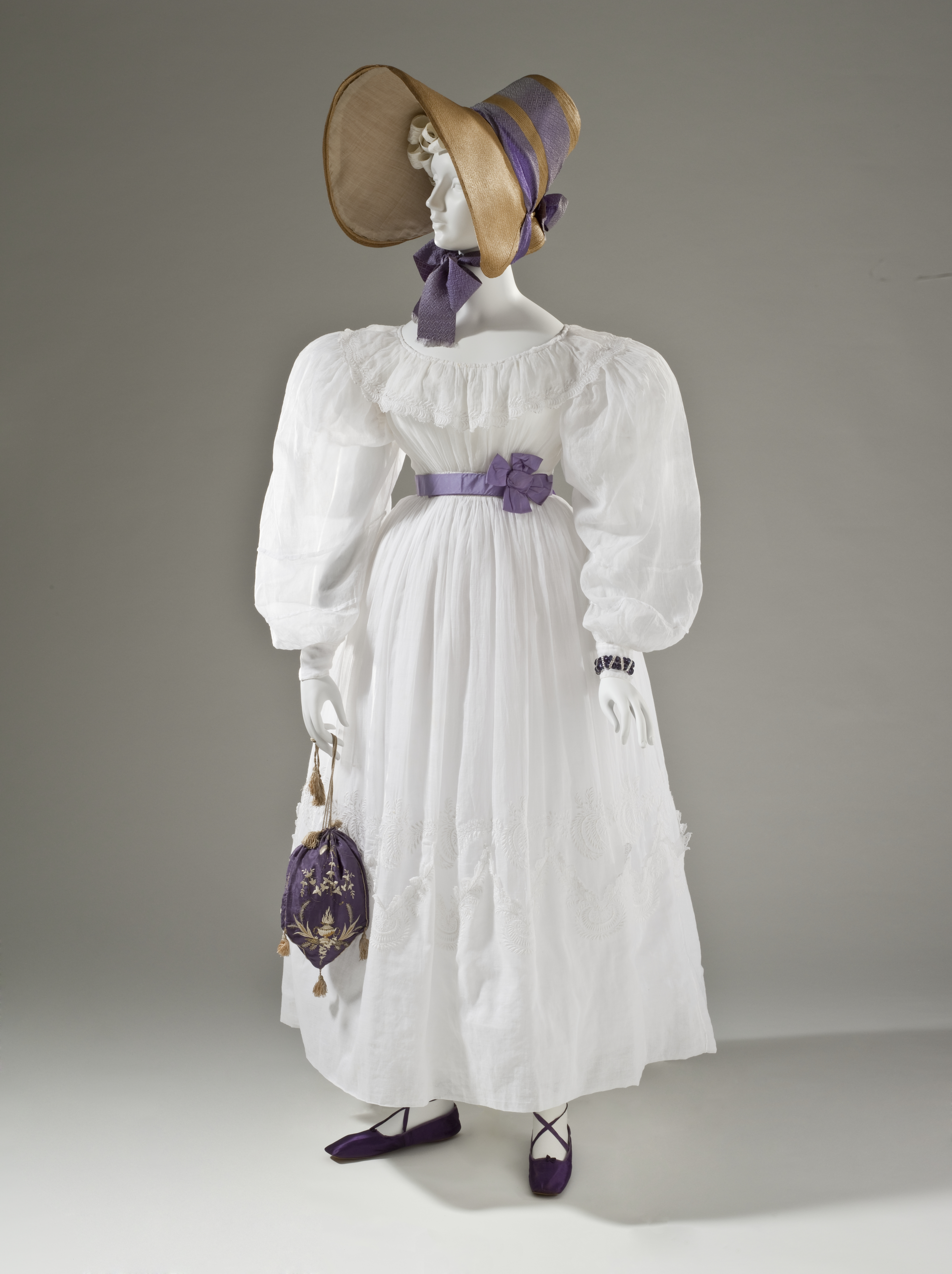
Woman's muslin dress, c. 1830.

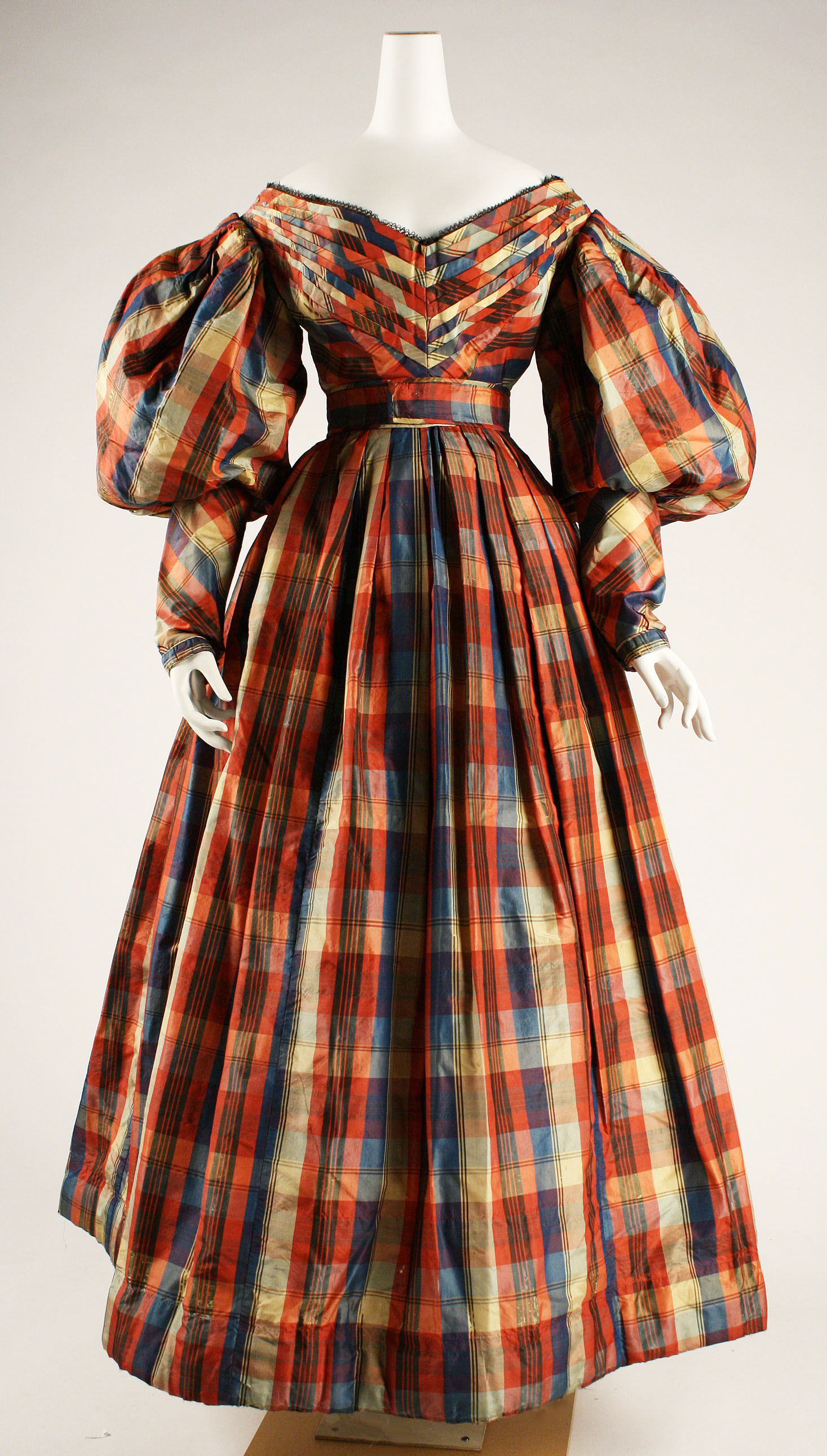
Woman's silk dress, c. 1830.

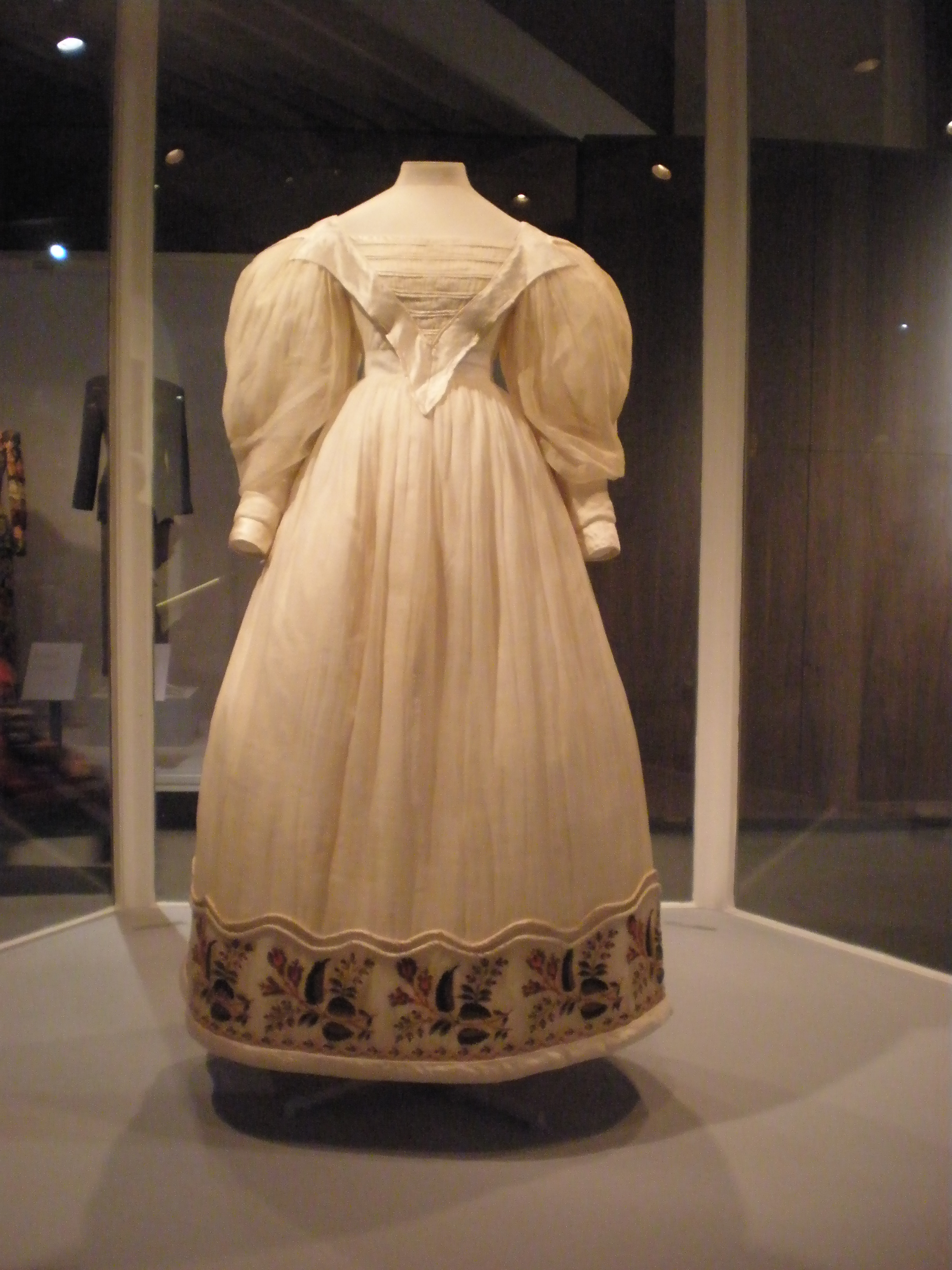
Wedding dress, 1830–33.

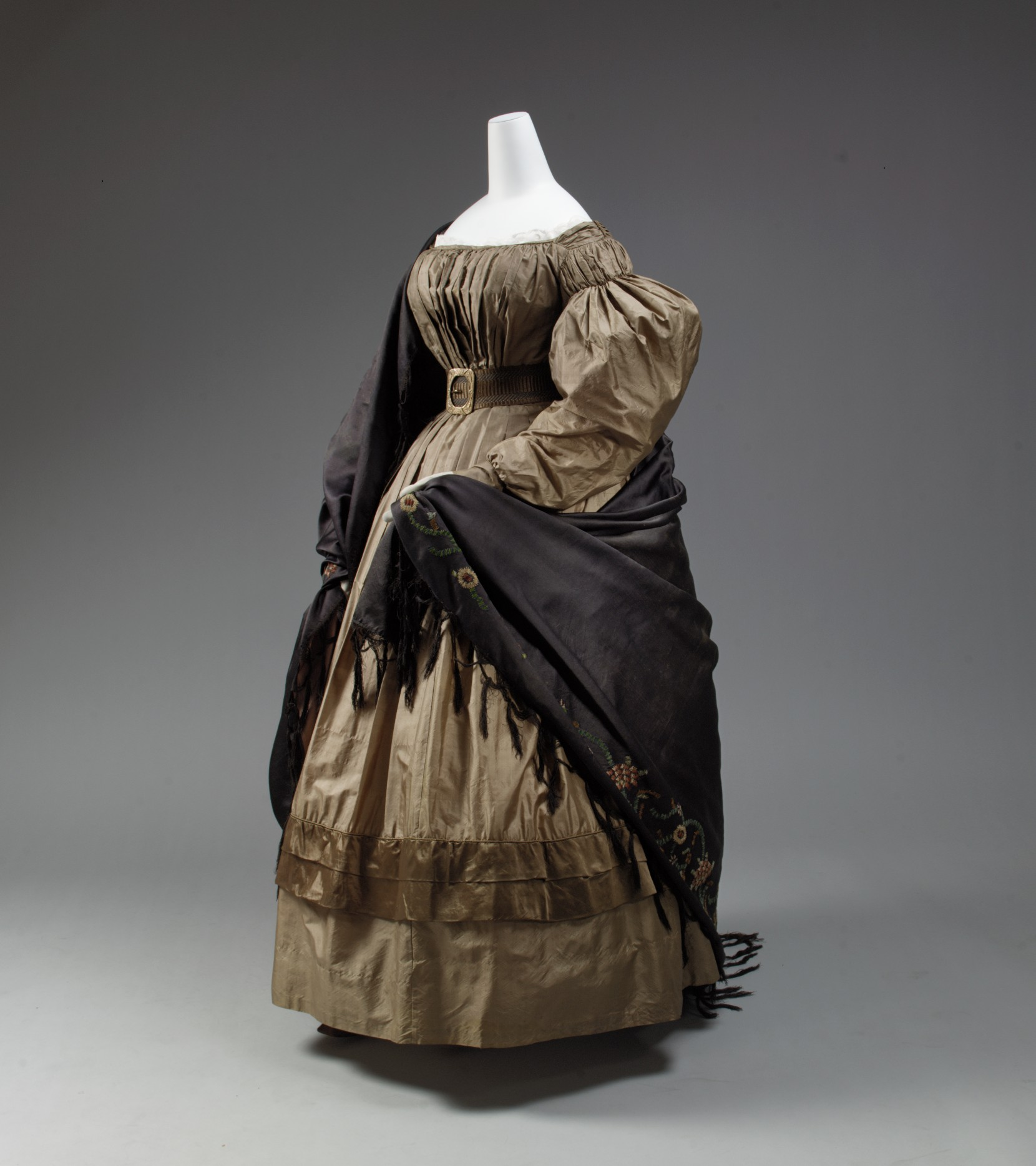
Silk dress, 1832–35.

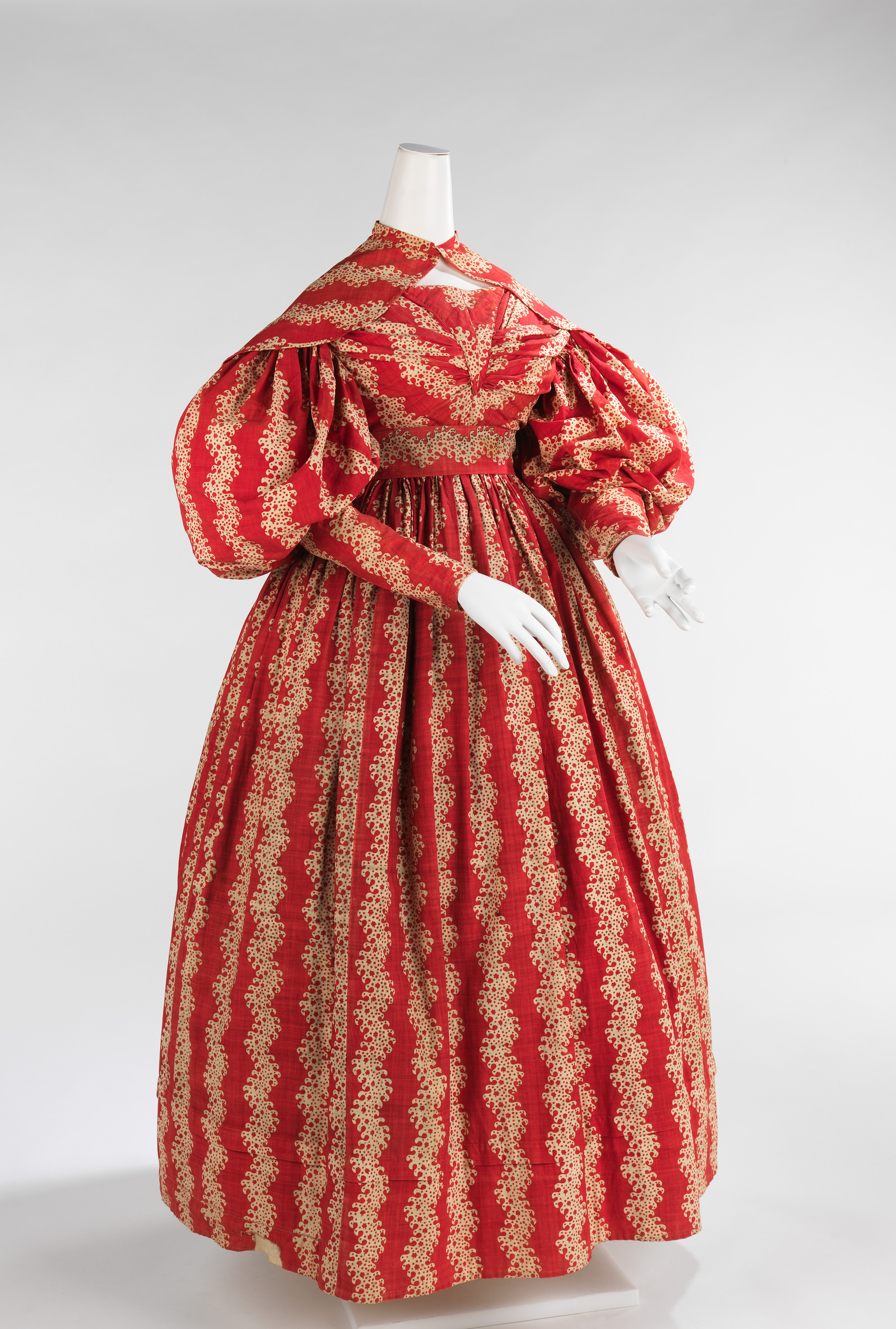
America cotton dress, 1832–35.

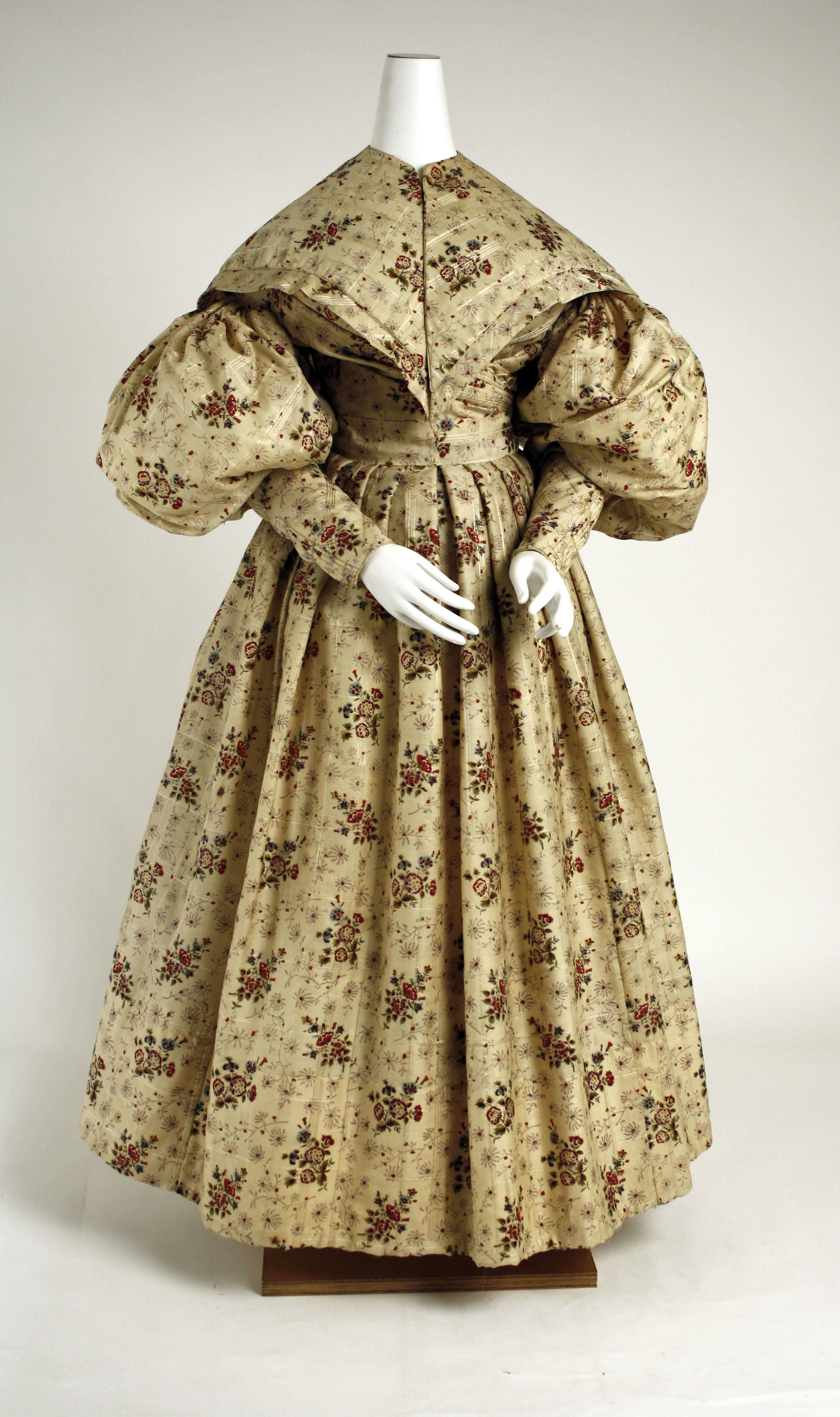
Silk afternoon dress, c. 1835.

=== Fashion plates ===
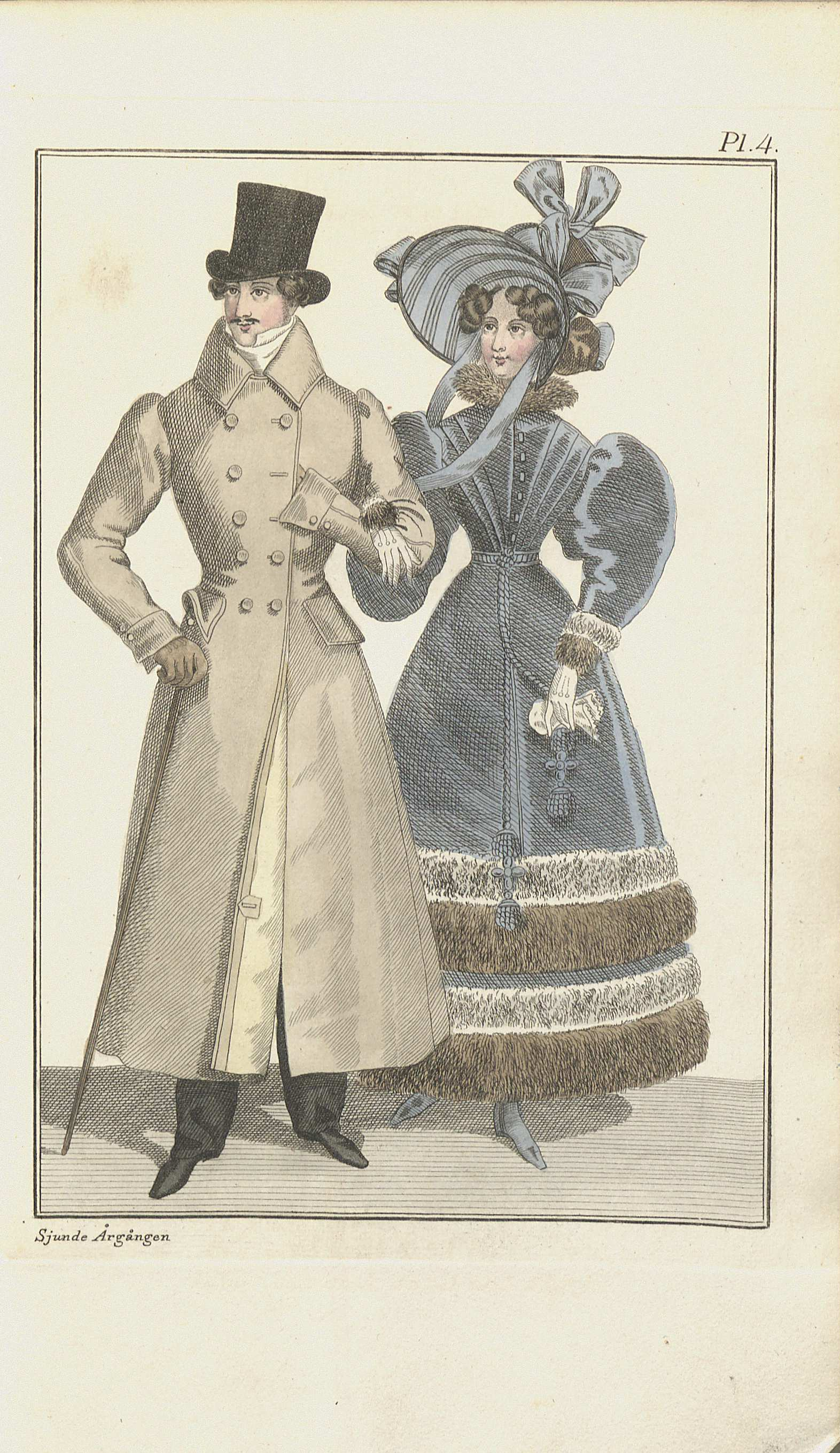
1830 fashion plate

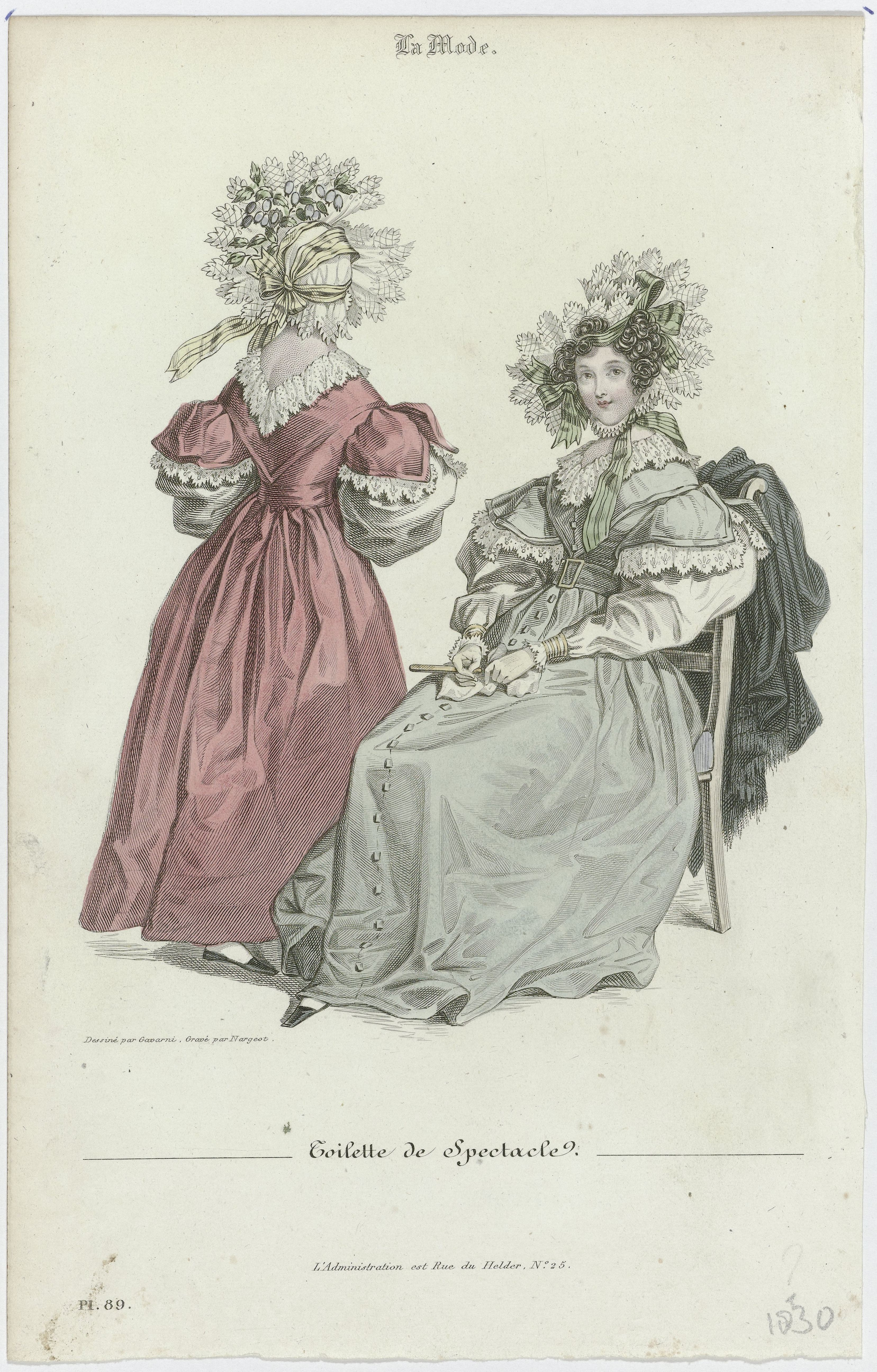
La Mode 1830

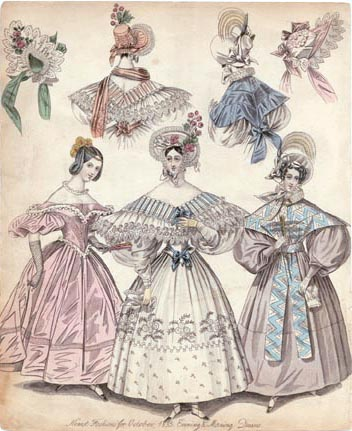
1833 fashion plate

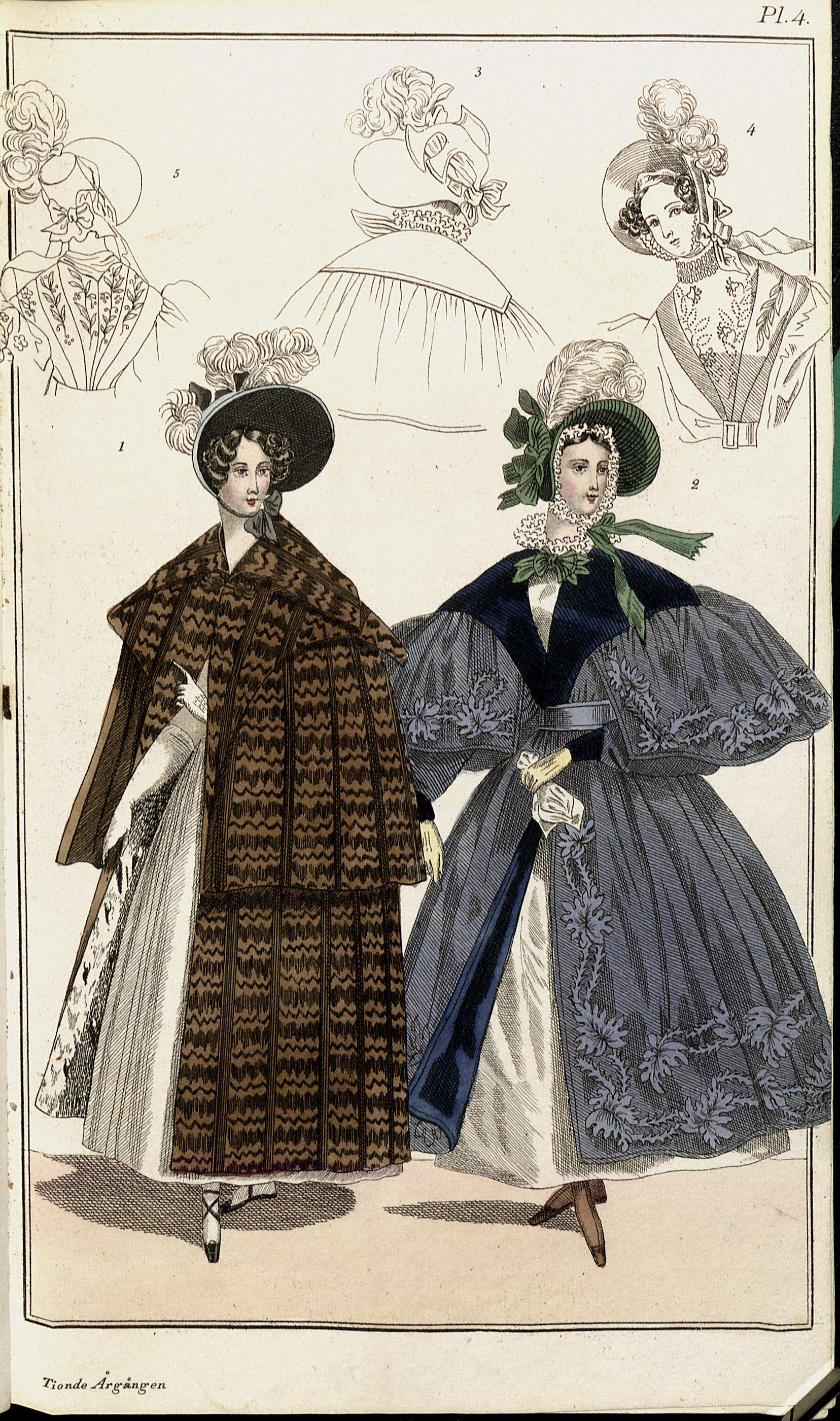
1833 fashion plate

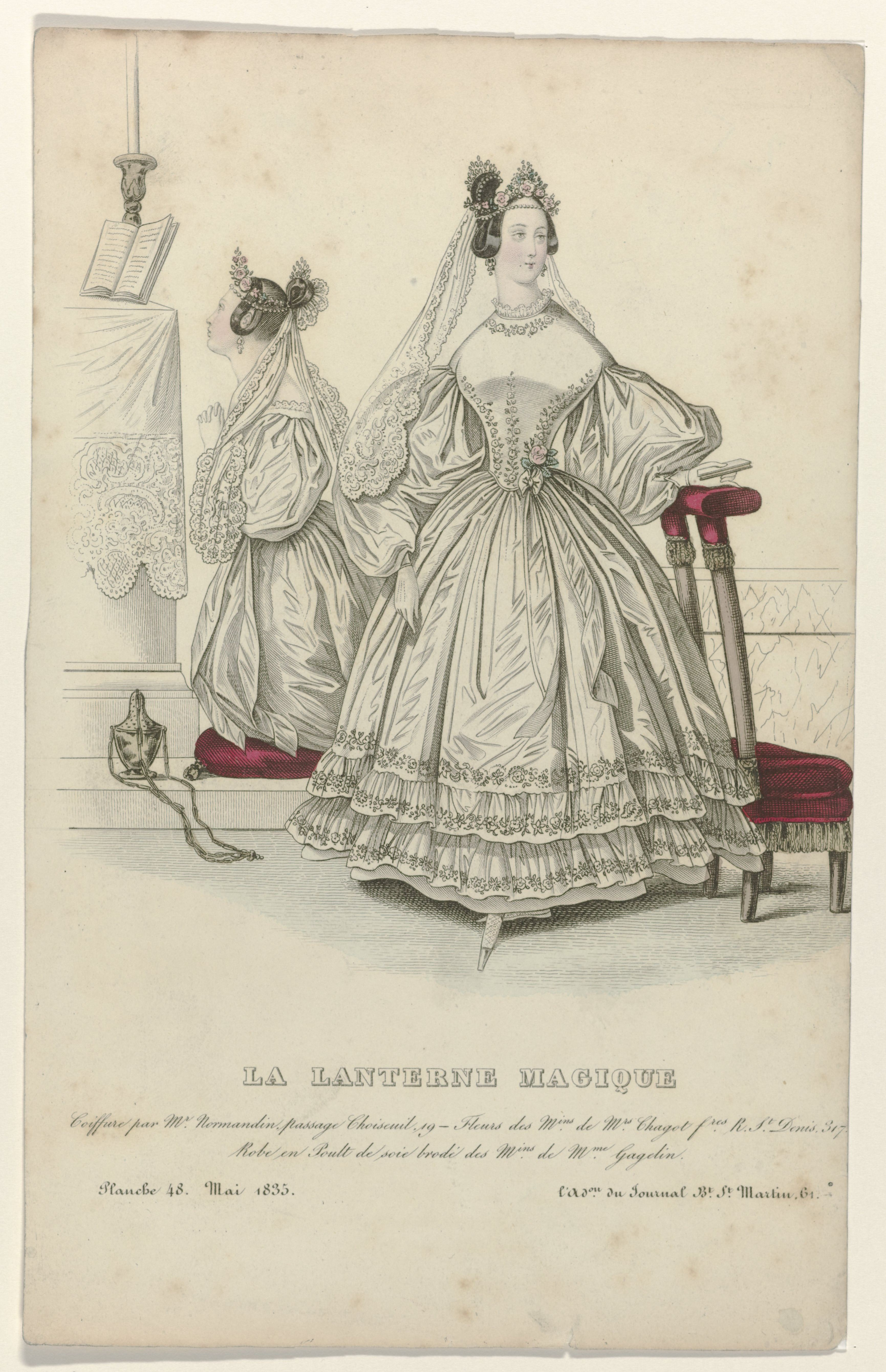
1835 fashion

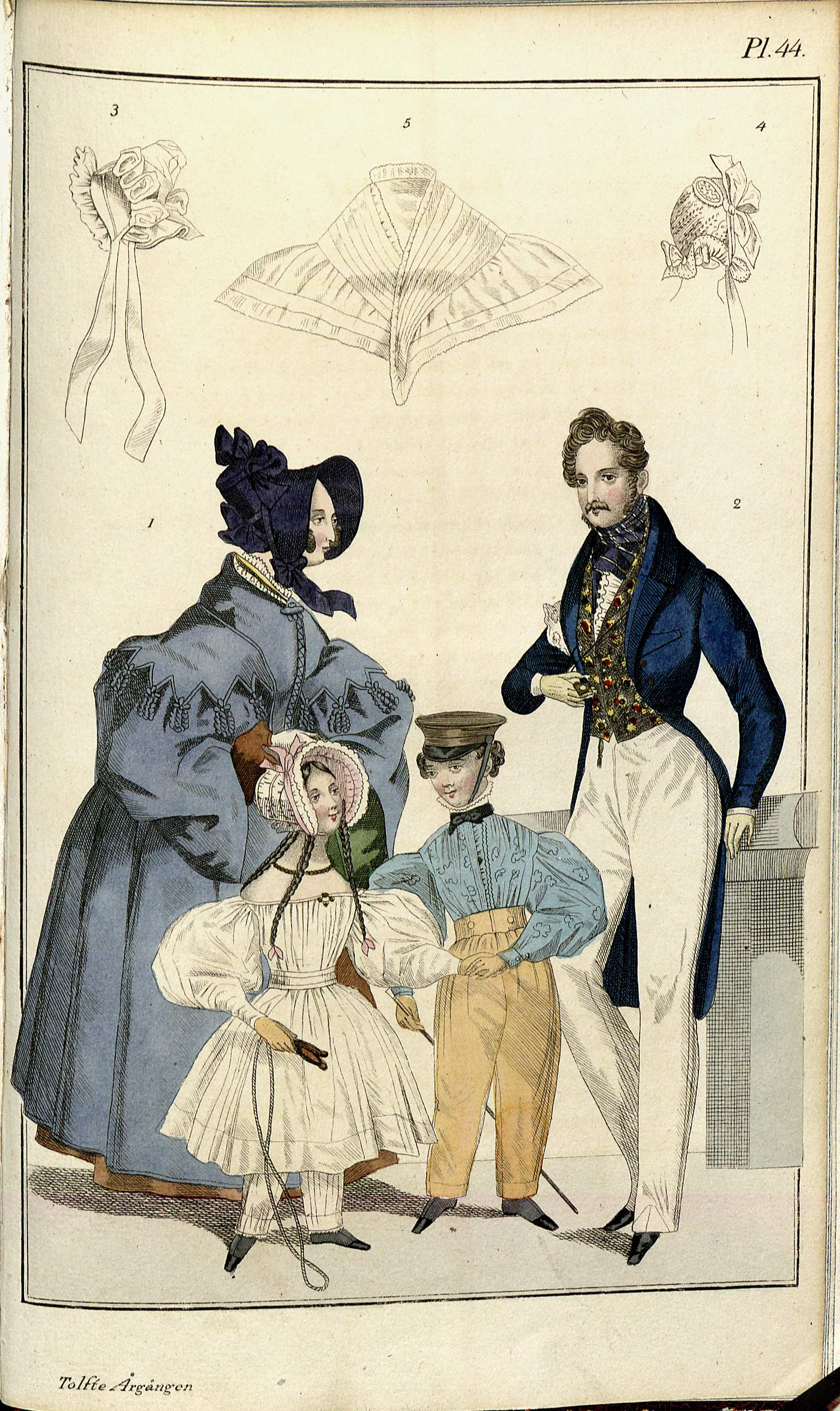
1835 fashion

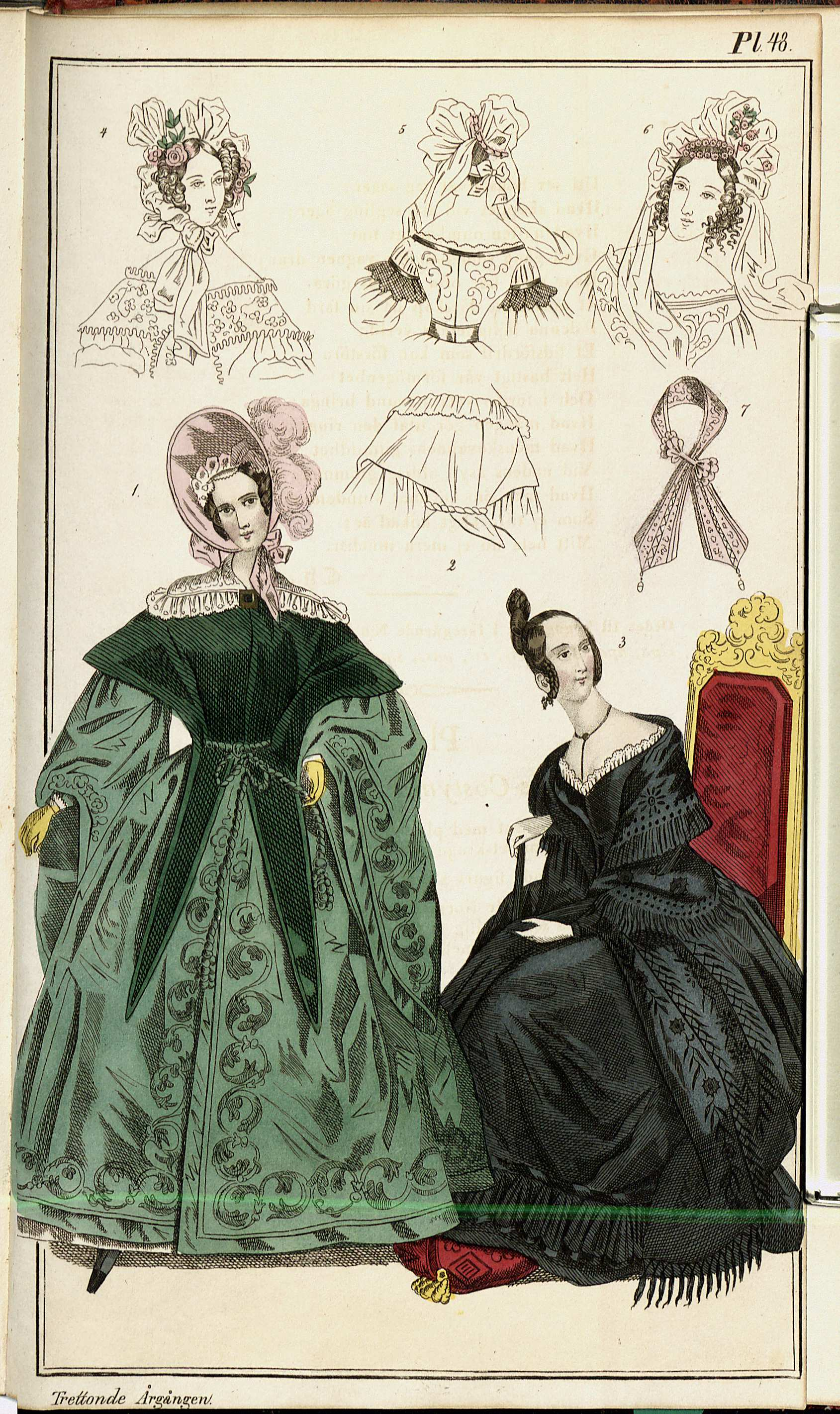
1836 fashion

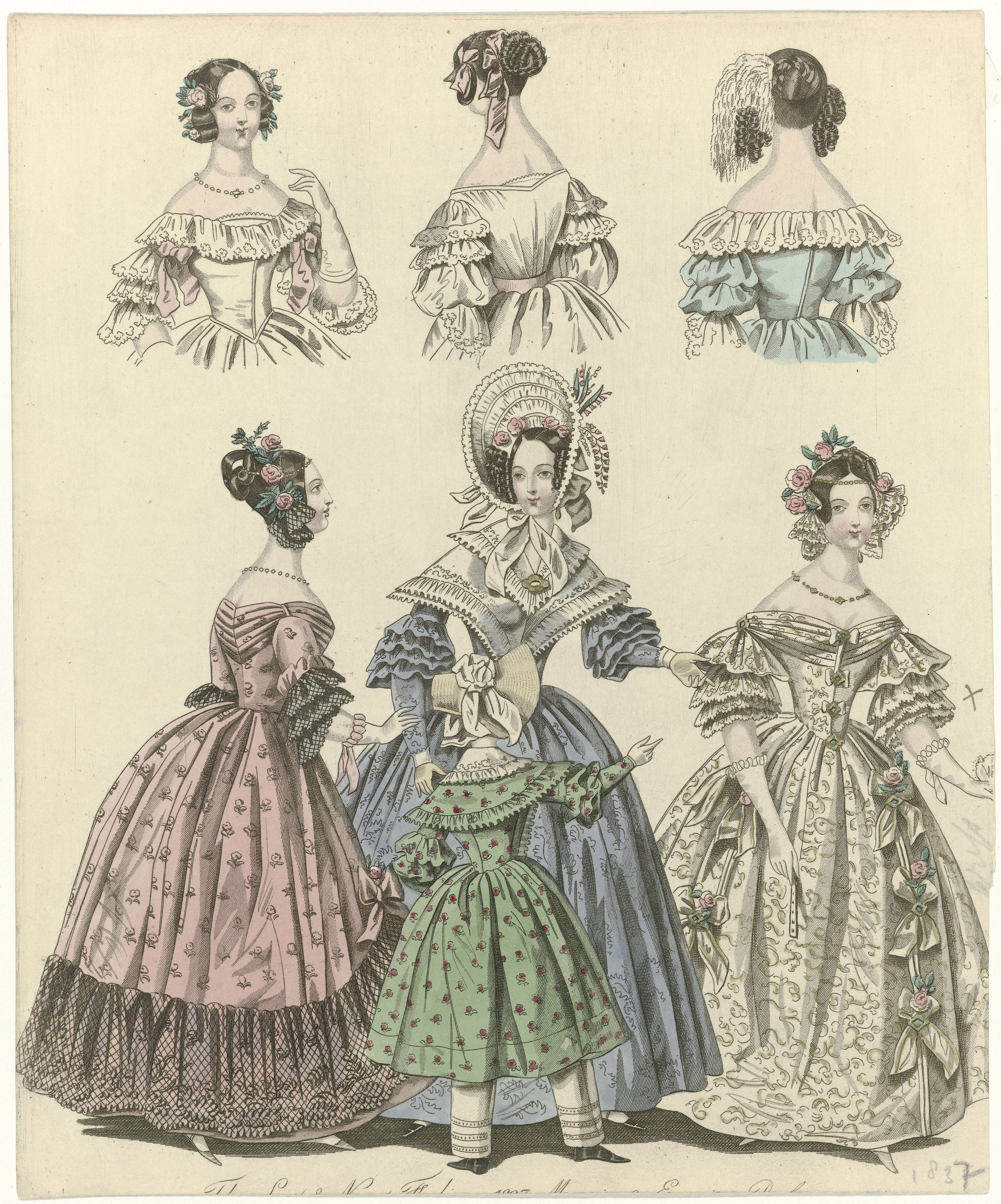
1837 fashion plate

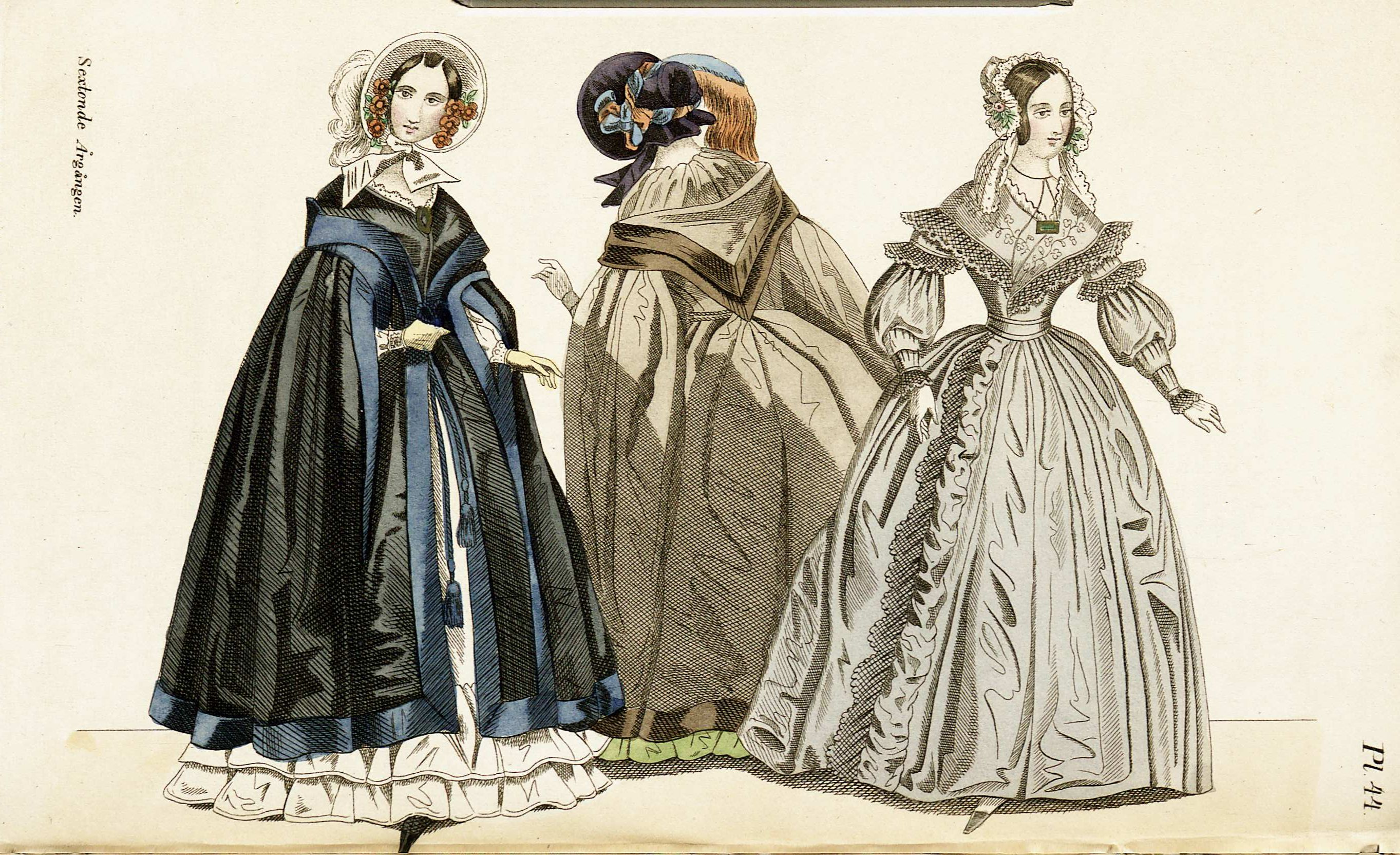
1839 fashion

=== New Orleans Fashion ===
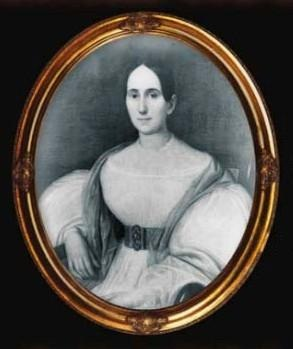
New Orleans followed western fashion.

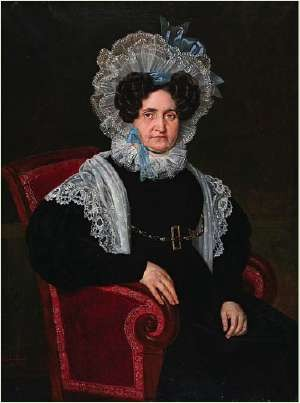
Mrs Samuel Hermann wearing a black dress with gold chain and white ruffle lace, 1830 New Orleans.

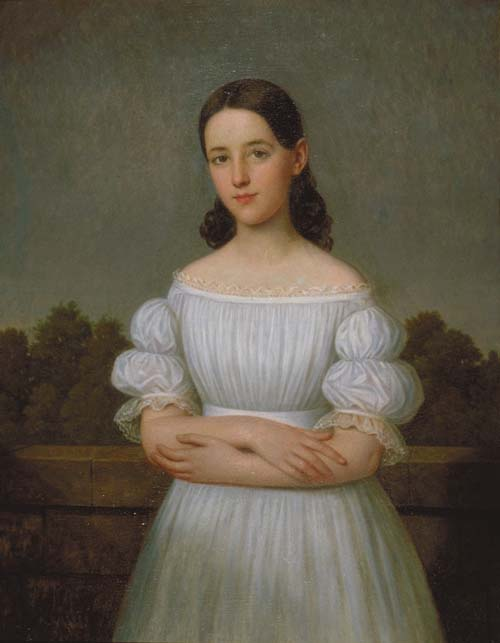
Young woman with a dress made of cotton, late 1830s New Orleans.

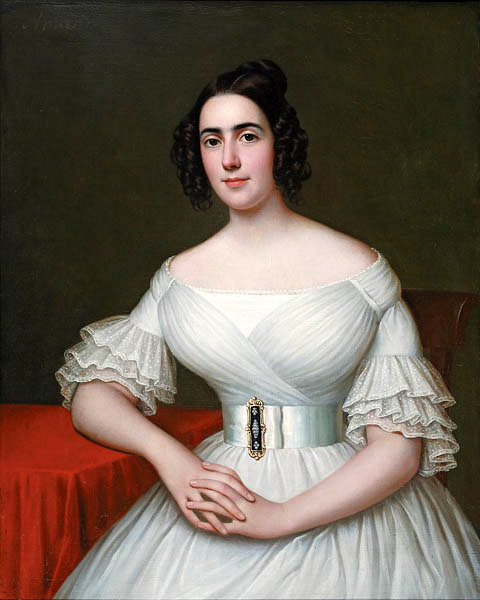
Augustine Massicot Tanneret wearing a white dress, Louisiana c. 1835.

== German fashion ==
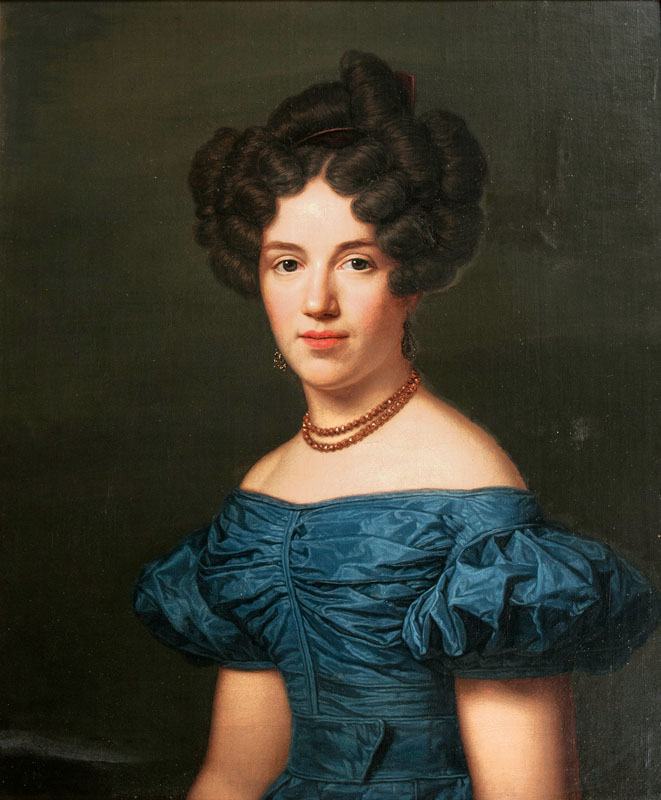
Germany, 1830

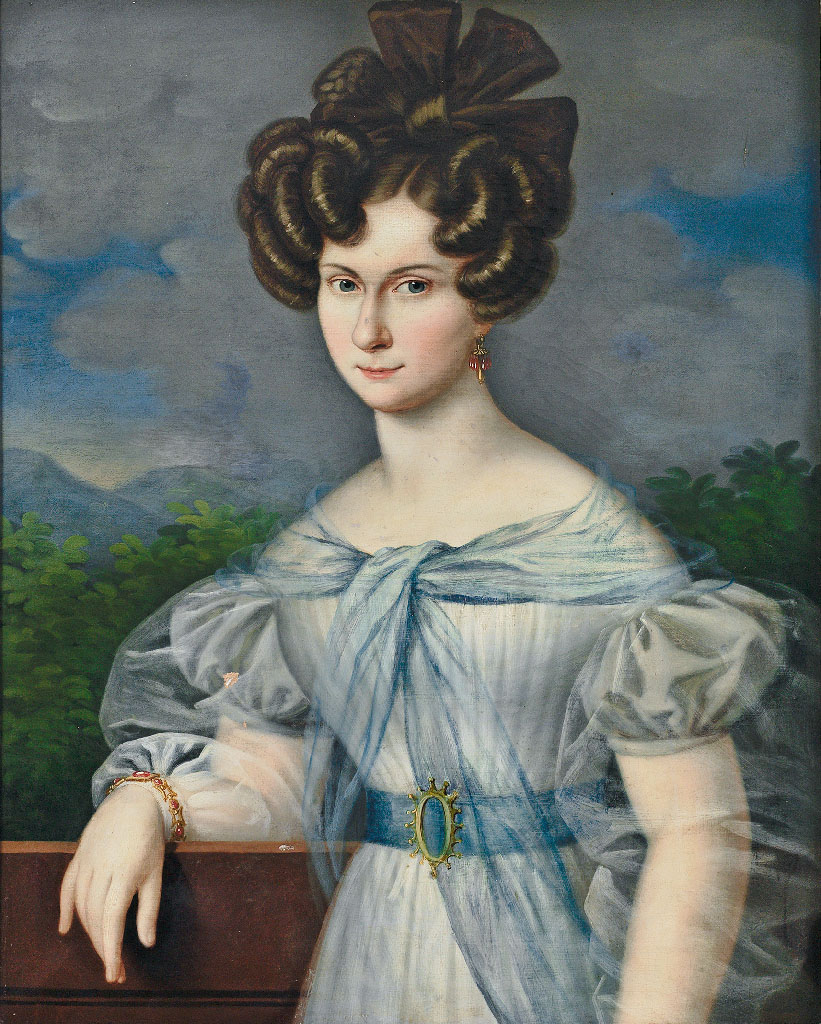
Germany, 1830

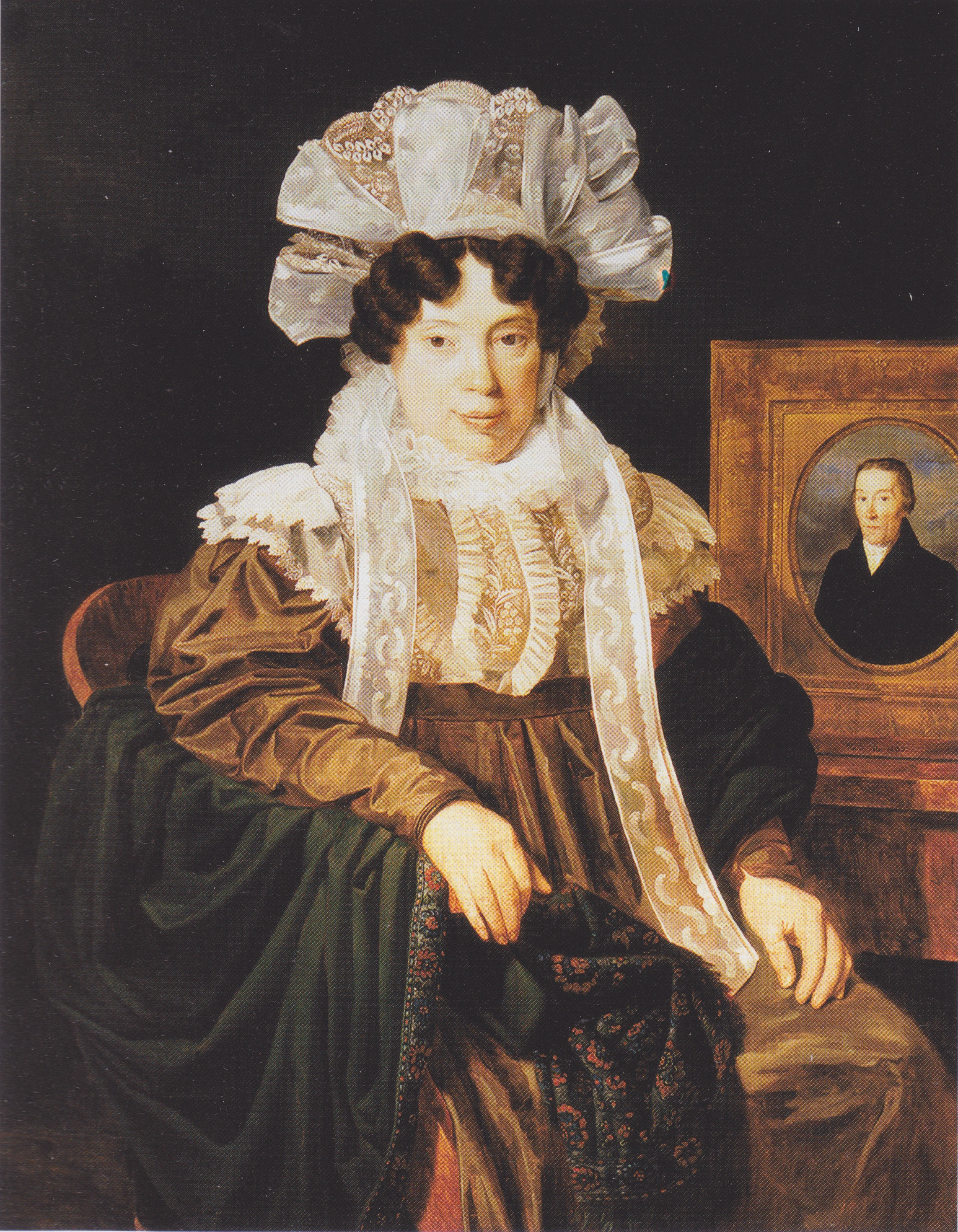
Germany, 1830

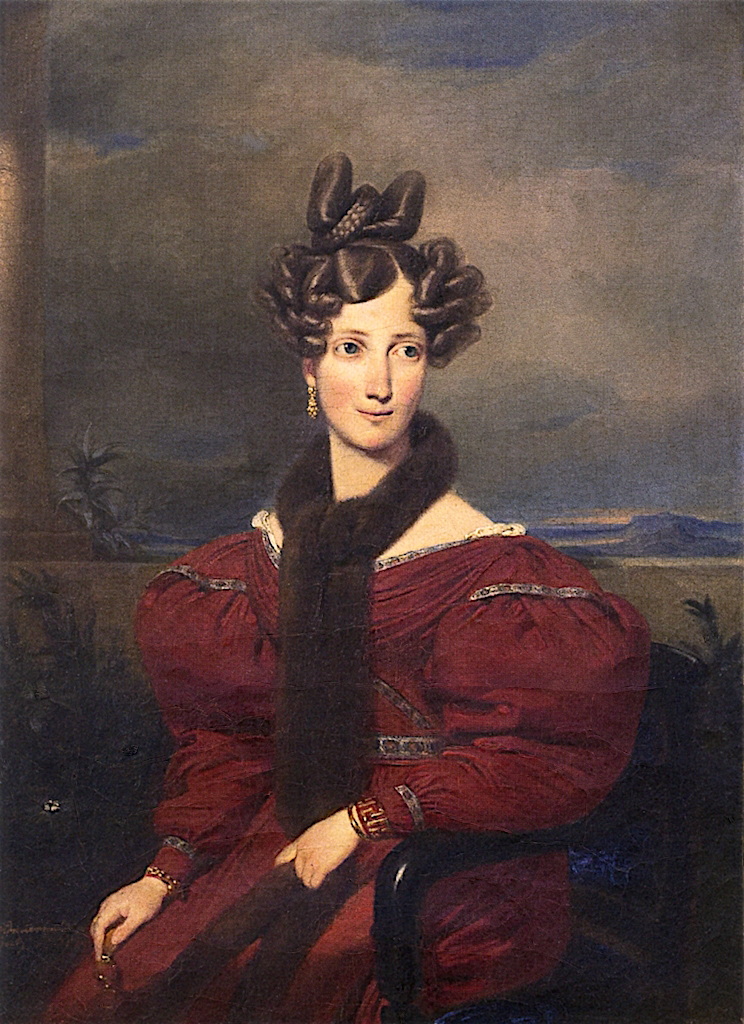
Germany, 1831

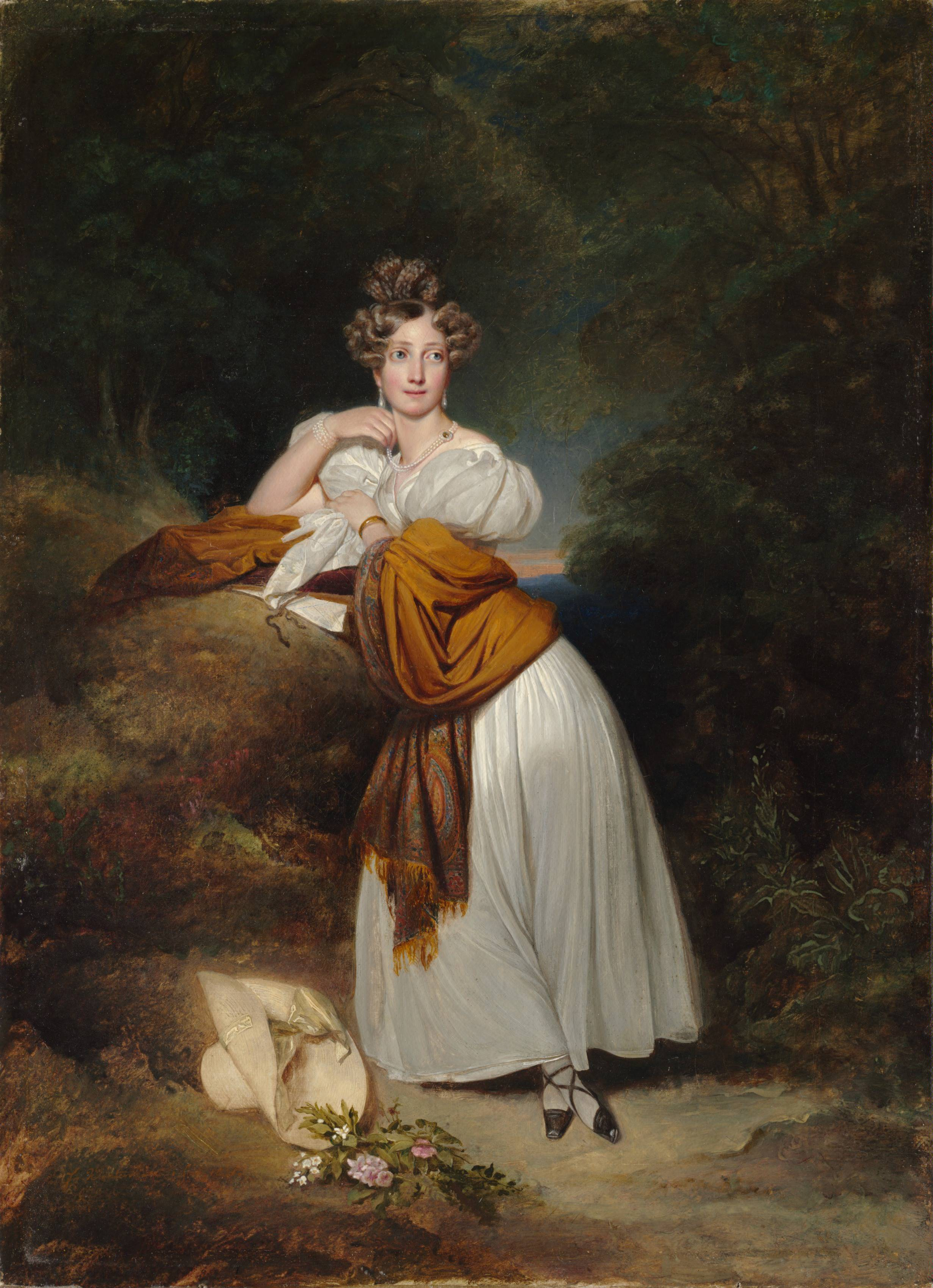
Germany, 1831

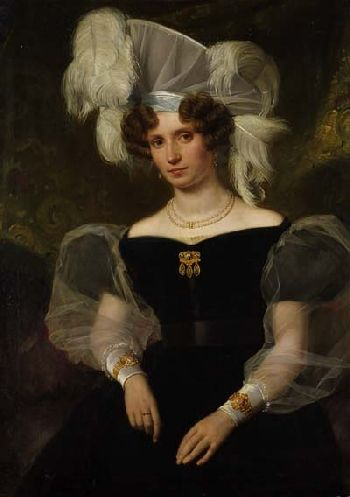
Germany, 1831

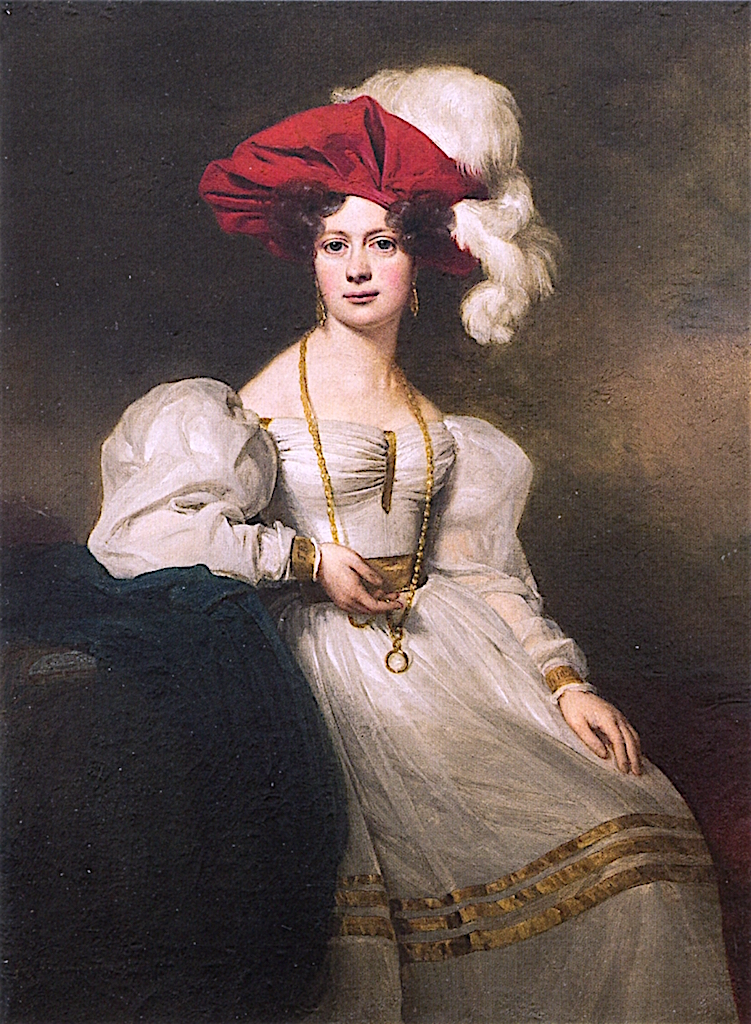
Germany, 1832

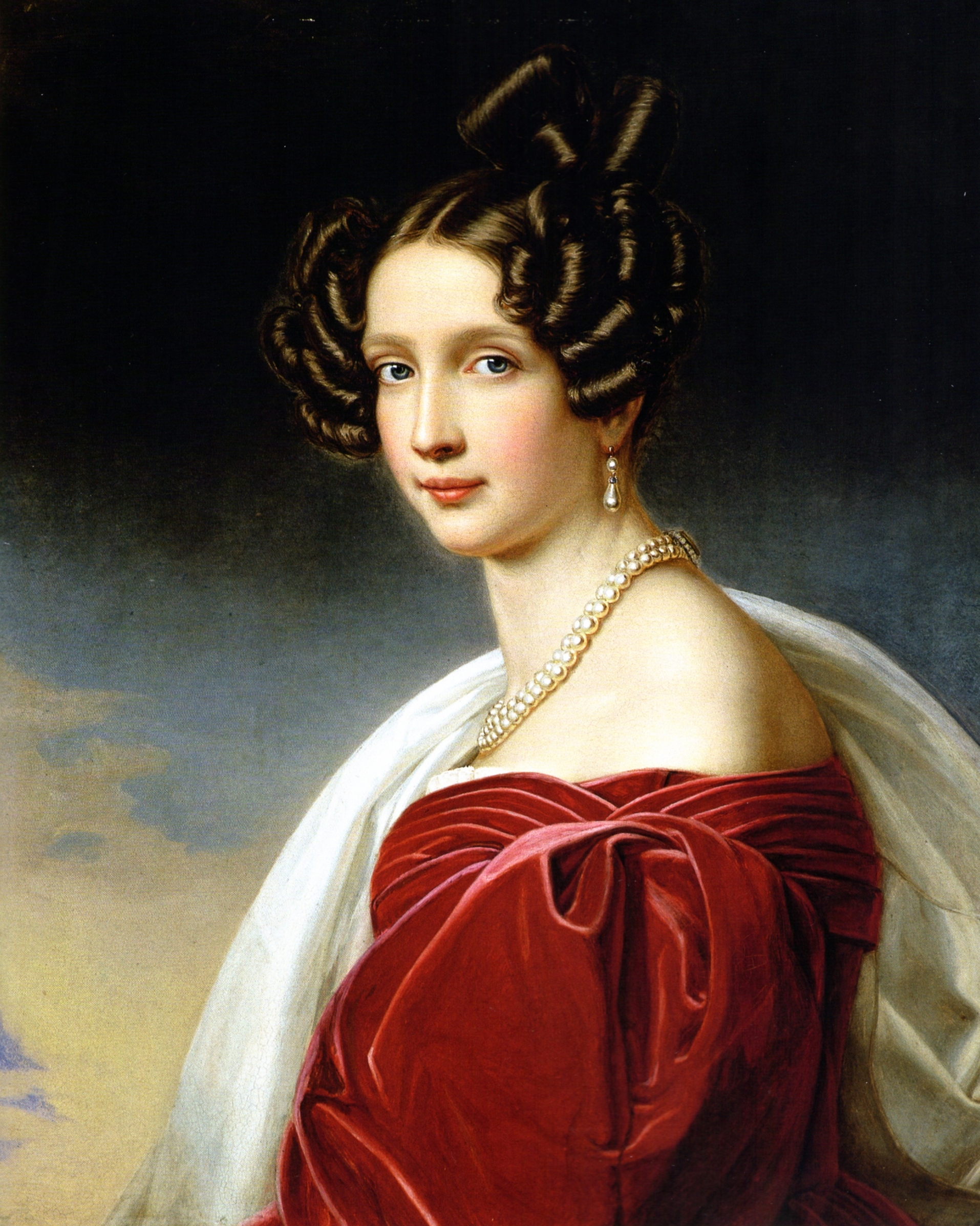
Germany, 1832

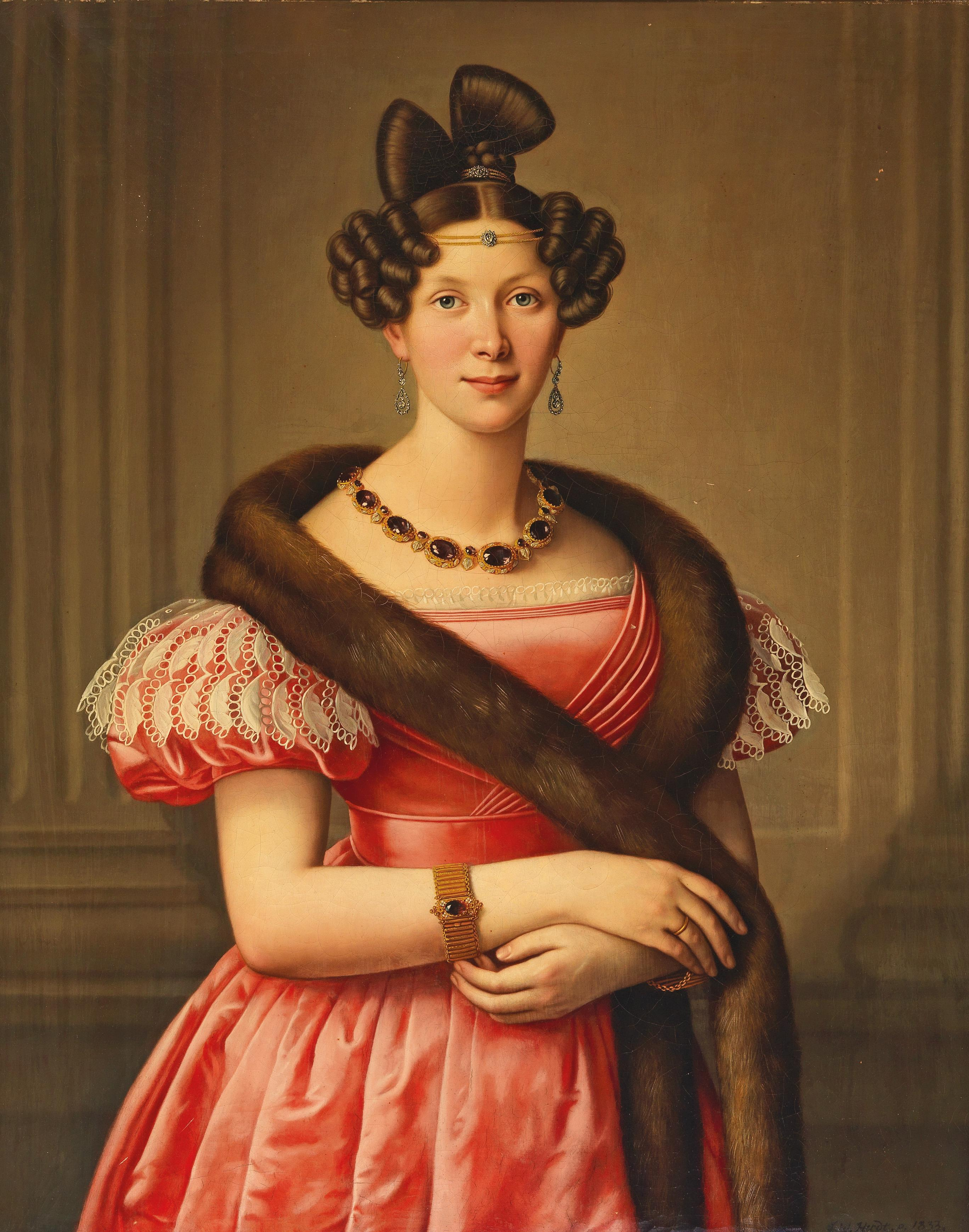
Germany, 1833

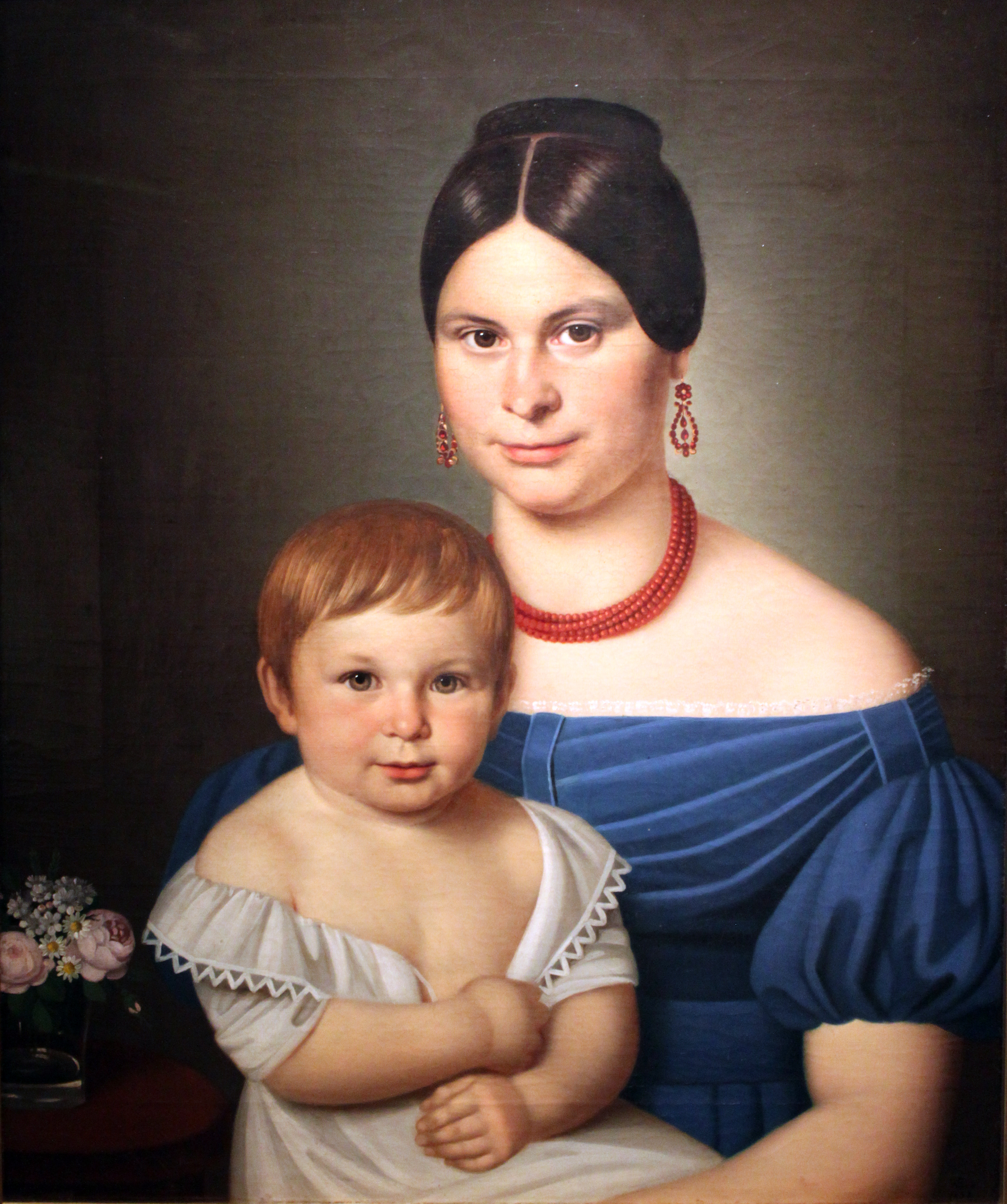
Germany, 1834

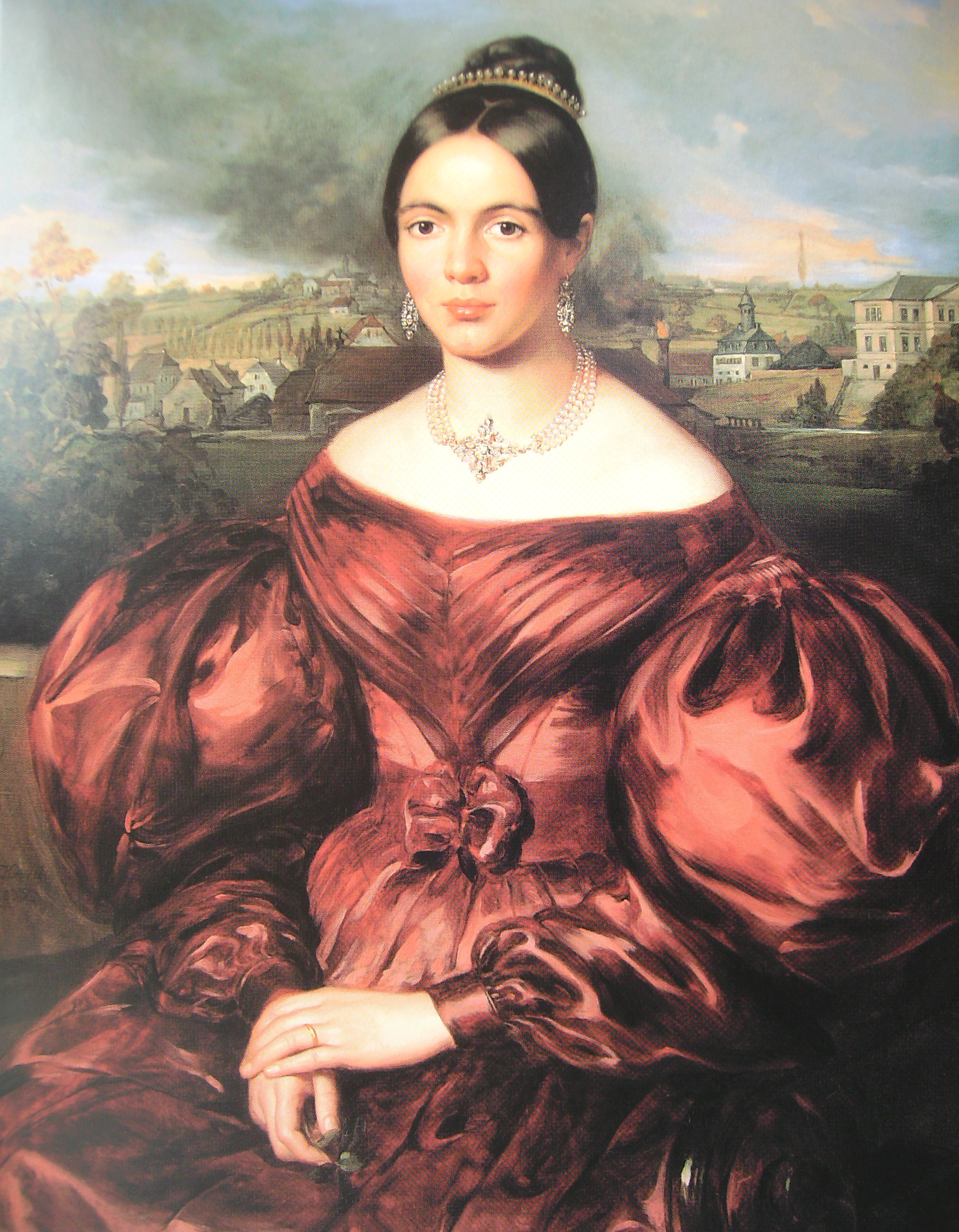
Germany, 1835

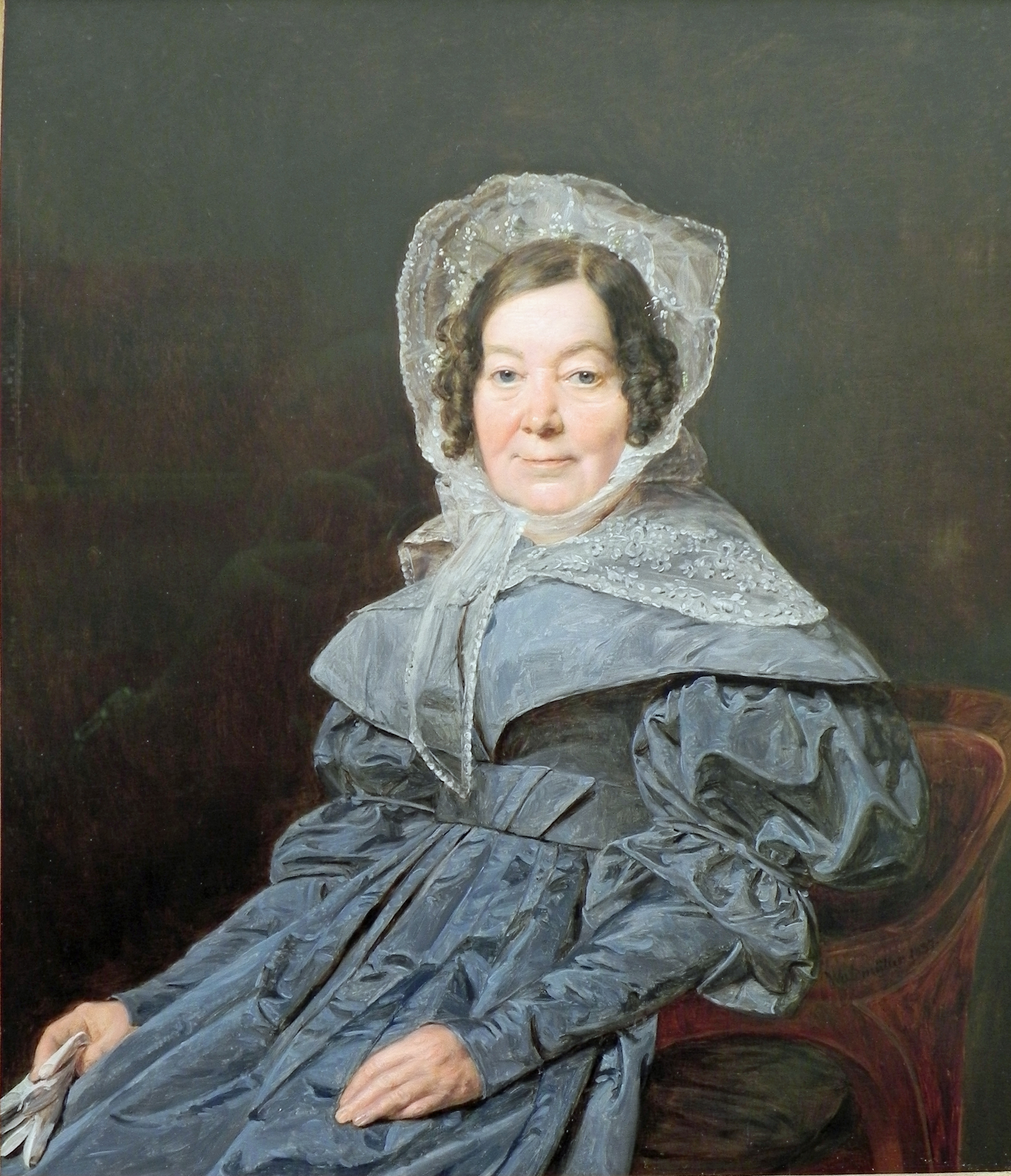
Germany, 1837

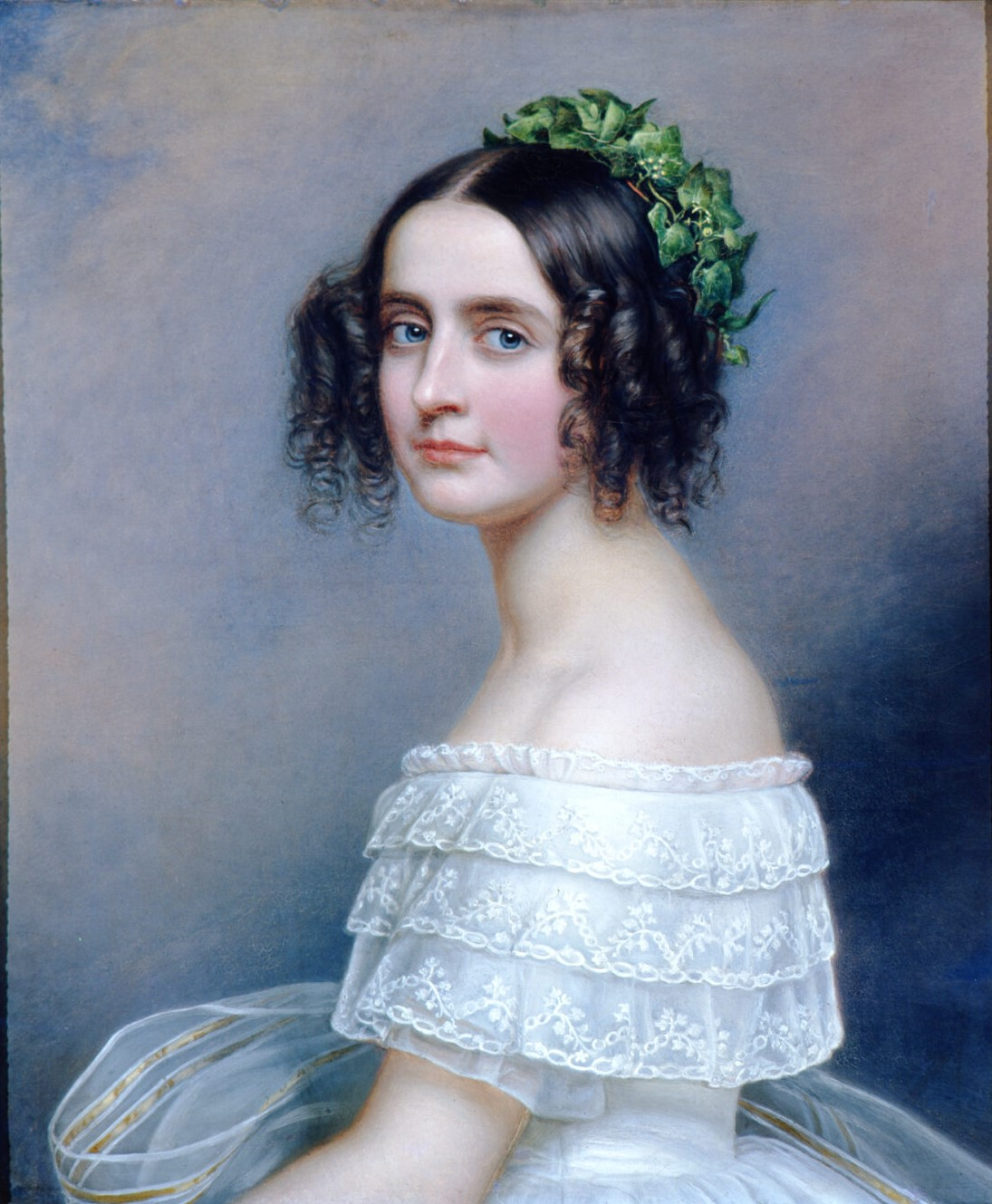
Germany, 1838

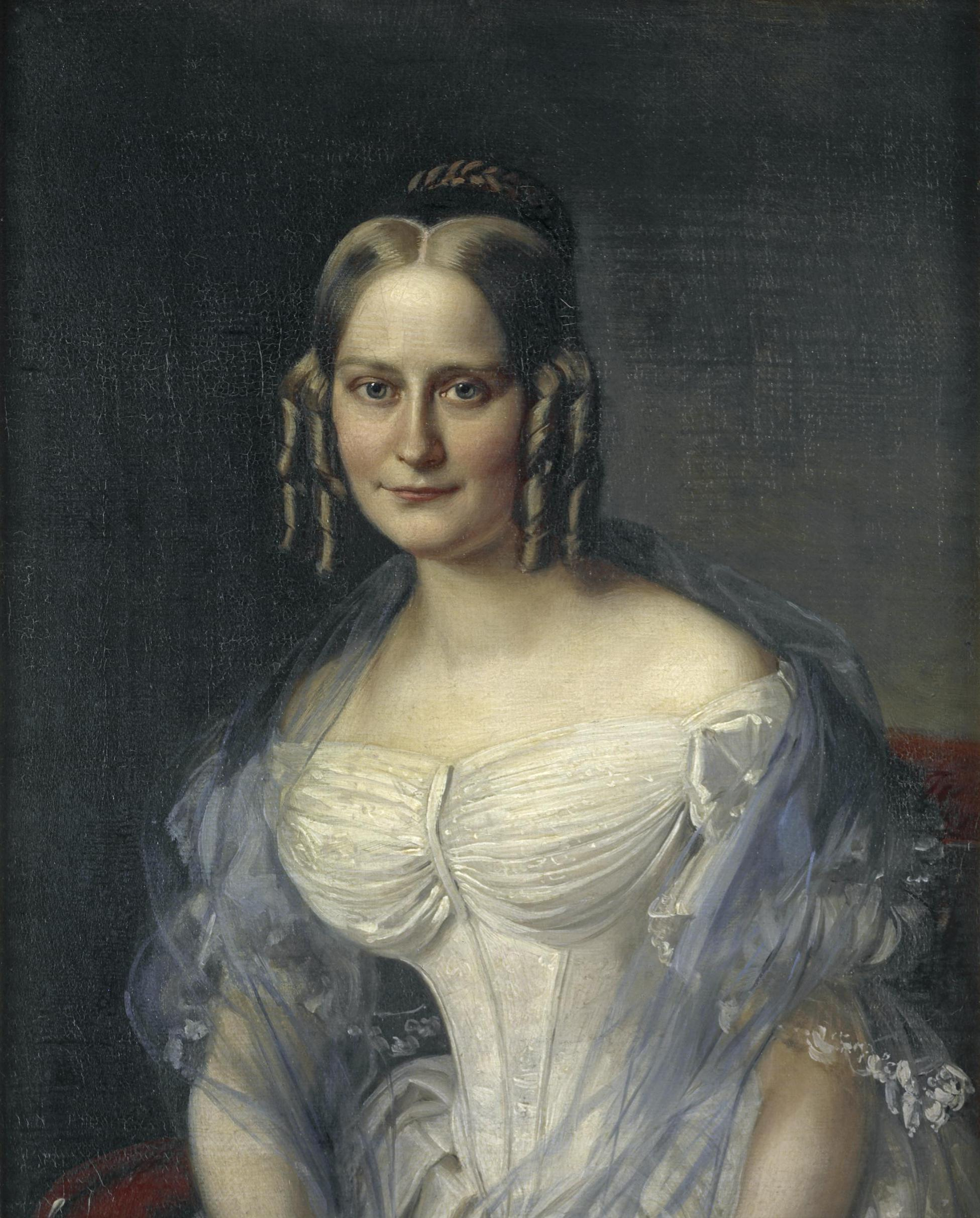
Germany, 1838

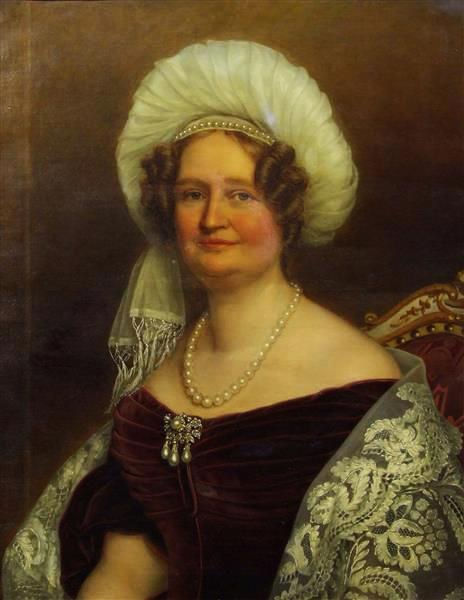
Germany, 1839

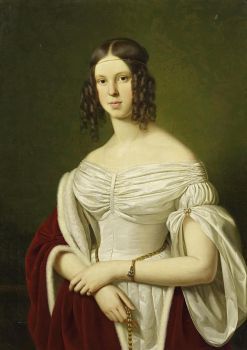
Germany, 1839

== Men's fashion ==
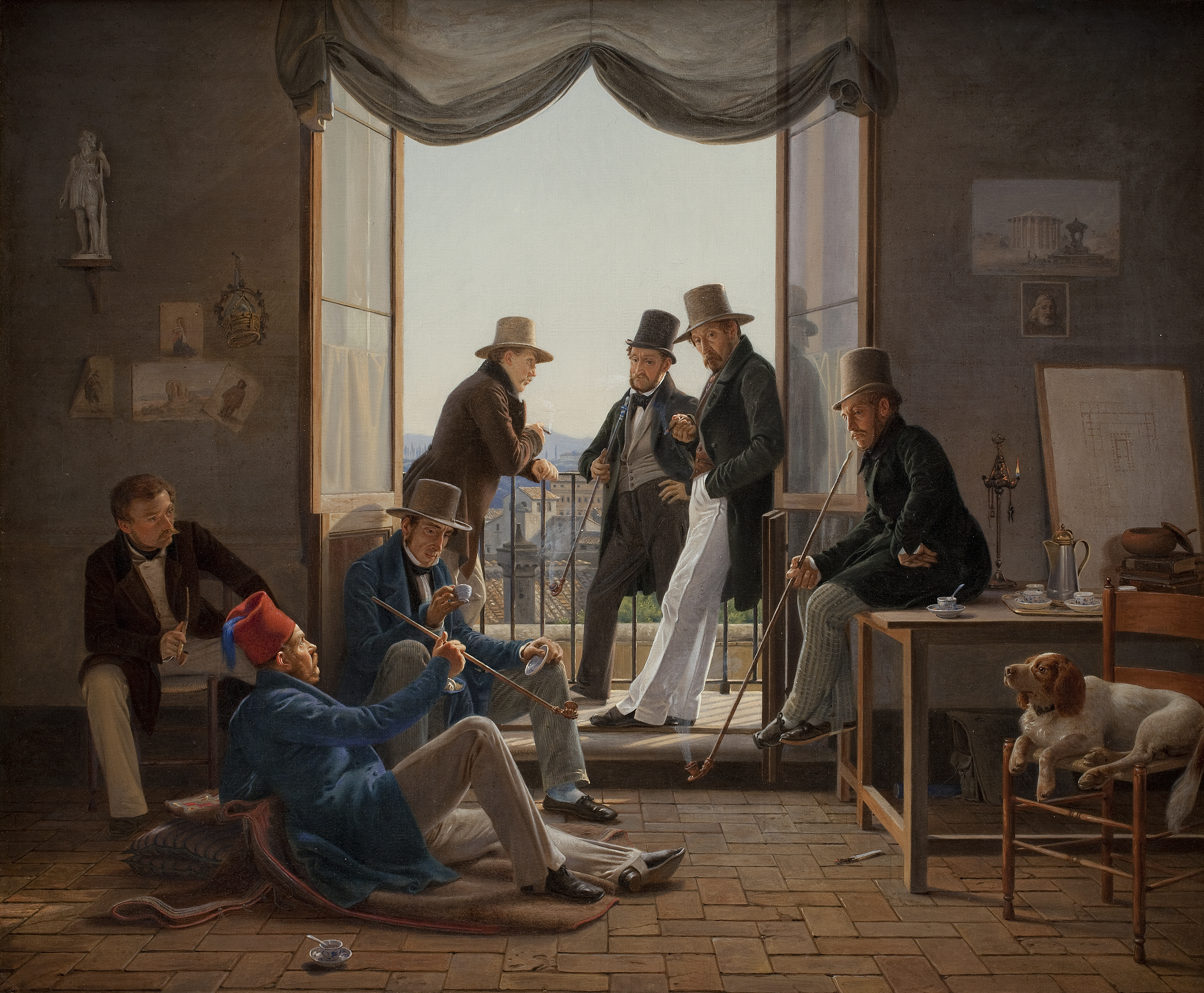
A group of Danish artists in Rome, 1837. Frock coats, fly-front trousers (some with straps under the instep), tall hats, and dark cravats are characteristic of the period.

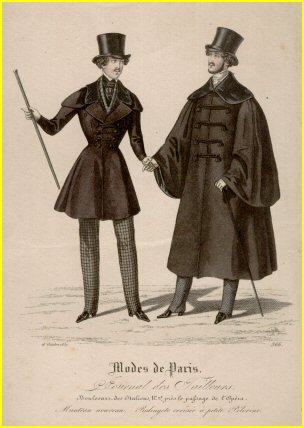
Men's fashion silhouette of 1837 shows broad shoulders and a narrow, tightly cinched waist.

=== Overview ===
In this time, men's fashion plates continue to show an ideal silhouette with broad shoulders, and a narrow, tightly cinched waist.

=== Coats and waistcoats ===
Frock coats (in French redingotes) increasingly replaced tail coats for informal day wear. They were calf length, and might be double-breasted. Shoulder emphasis fell lower on the arm; shoulders were sloped and puffed sleeve heads gradually shrank and then disappeared. Waistcoats or vests were single- or double-breasted, with rolled shawl or (later) notched collars, and extremely tight through the waist. Waistcoats were sometimes worn two at time, in contrasting colors. Corsets or corset-like garments were worn by many men to draw in the waistline. The most fashionable coats had padded shoulders and chests, a feature that disappeared after about 1837.

=== Trousers ===
Full-length trousers began to have the modern fly-front closure, replacing the earlier fall-front. Breeches remained a requirement for formal functions at the British court (as they would be throughout the century). Breeches continued to be worn for horseback riding and other country pursuits, especially in Britain, with tall fitted boots.

=== Outerwear ===
Cloaks were worn with evening wear. Overcoats with wide sleeves were worn with day wear; these were often called greatcoats.

=== Hats and hairstyles ===
The crowns of tall hats were less curvy than in the previous period. Hair was generally parted to one side. Curled hair and sideburns remained fashionable, along with moustaches.

=== Style gallery ===
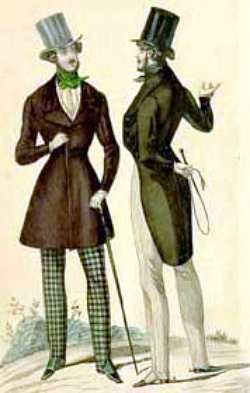
1 – 1830s

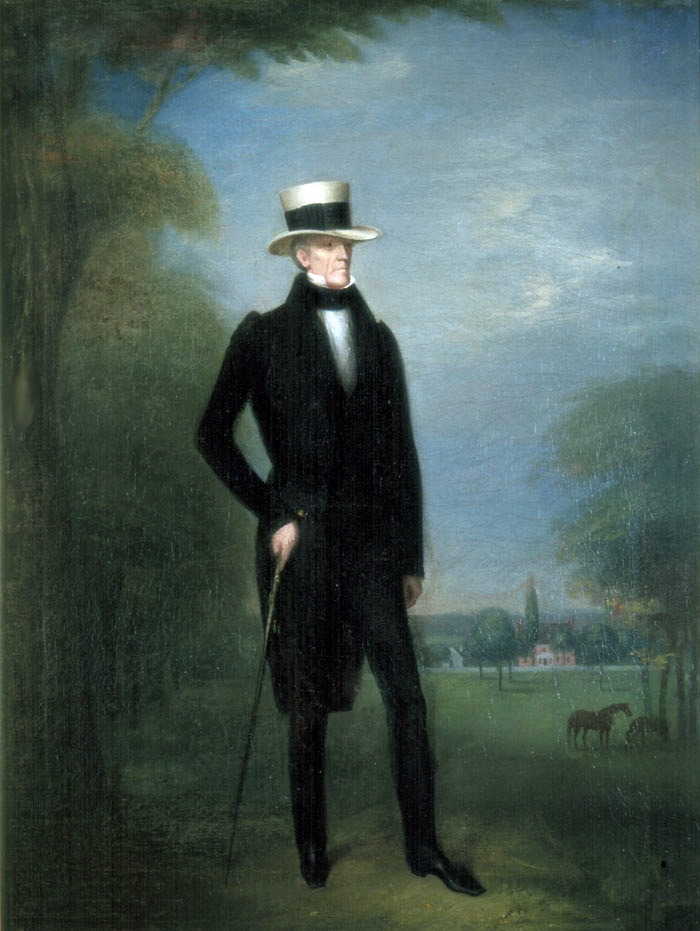
2 – ca. 1830

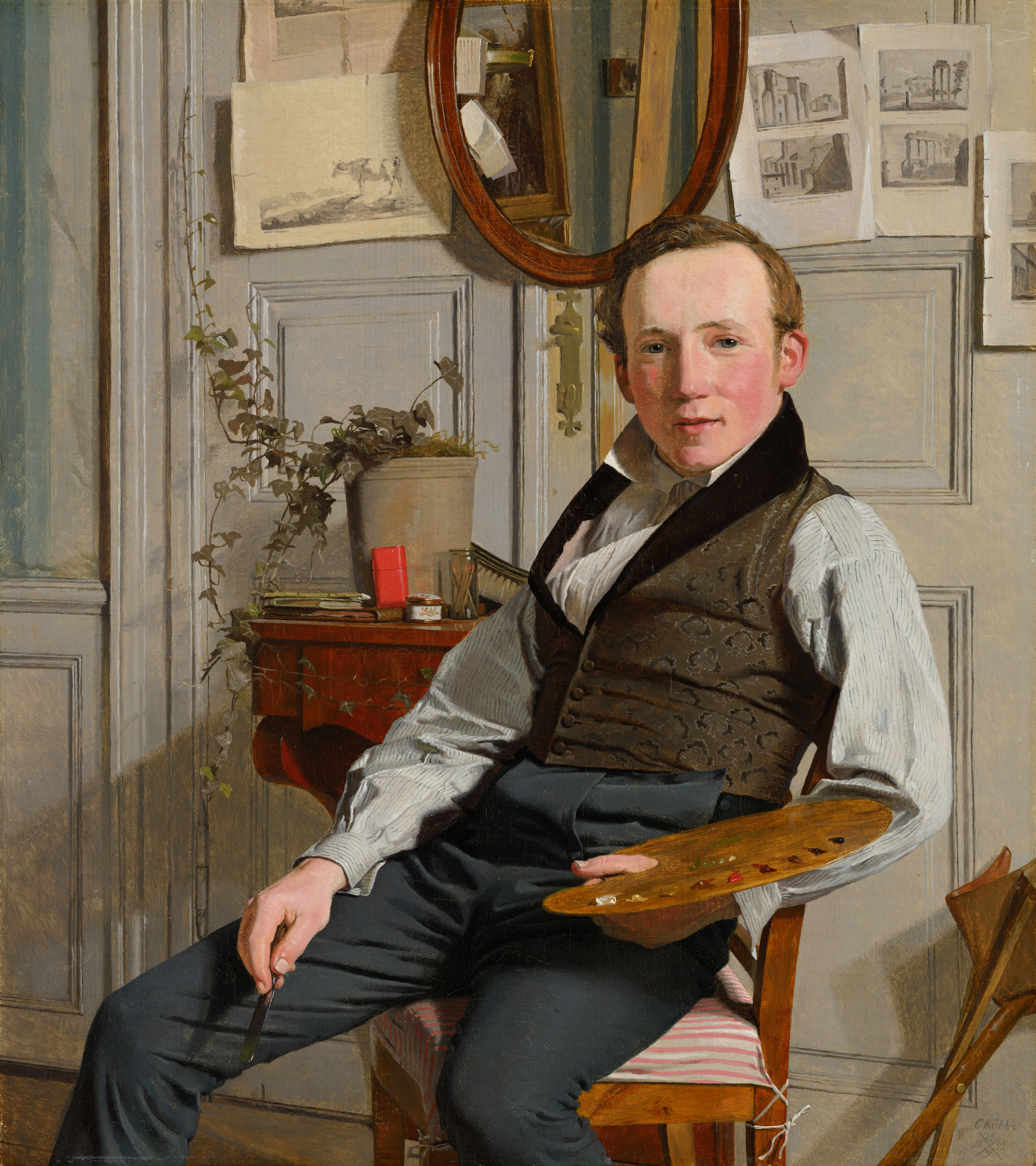
3 – 1832

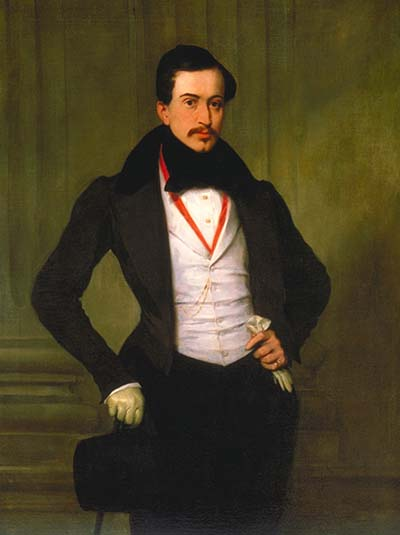
4 – 1833

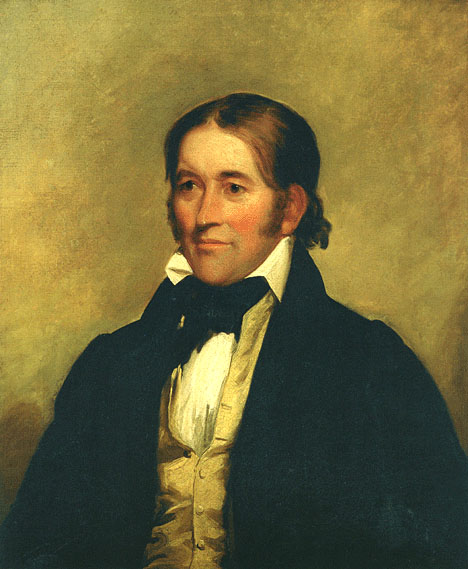
5 – 1834

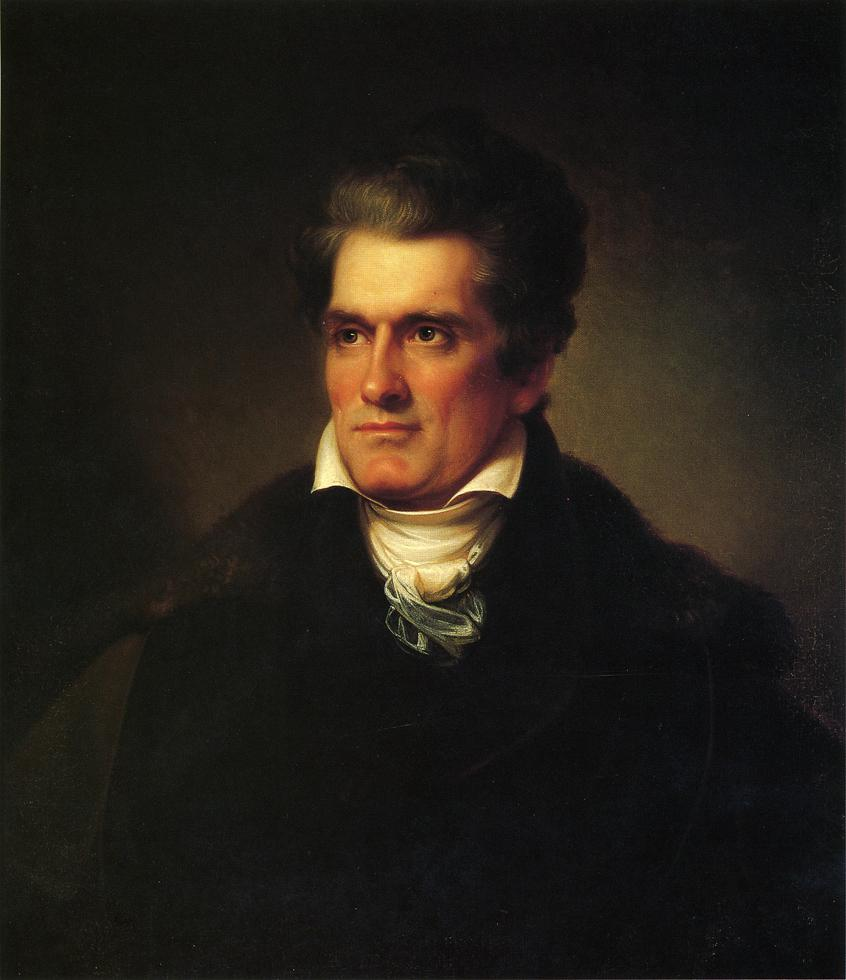
6 – 1834

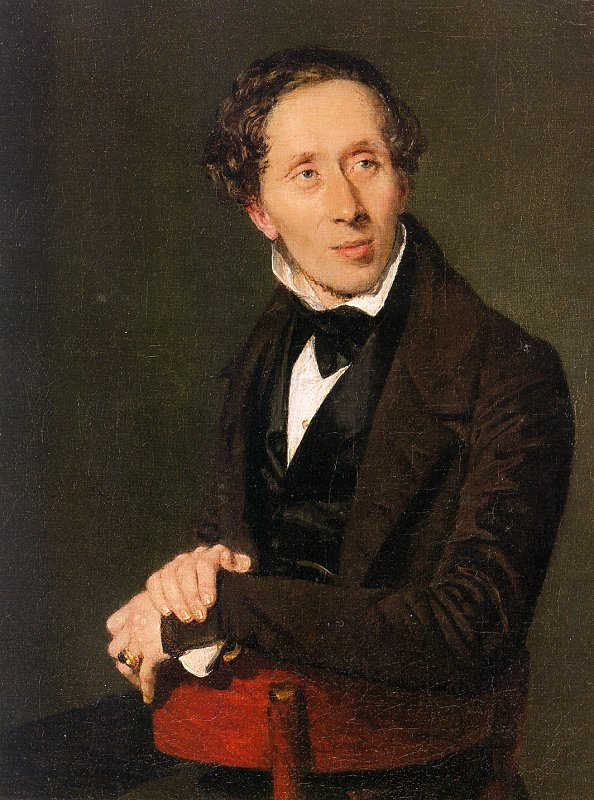
7 – 1836

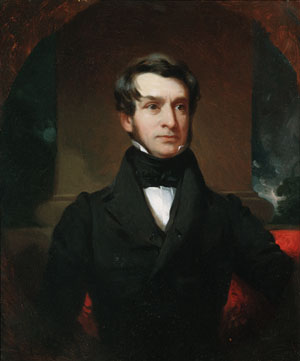
8 – 1838–40

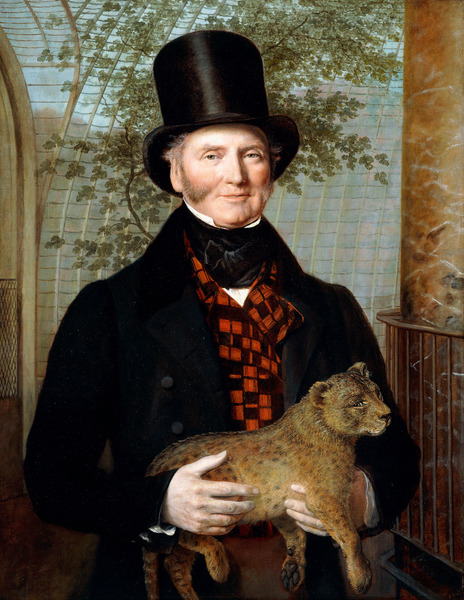
9 – 1838
1. 1830s fashion plate shows the small, high waist that was the ideal of French fashion in the 1830s. Frock coat (left) and morning coat (right).
2. Andrew Jackson in his portrait, The Tennessee Gentleman, wears a black mourning suit with a white ruffle shirt, black neck sock, and a felted beaver pelt top hat wrapped in a mourning band.
3. Frederik Sødring wears a brocade waistcoat with a high black velvet shawl collar. The front flap of his fall-front trousers can be seen clearly in this 1832 portrait. Note the taper of the waistcoat toward the tight waist.
4. Antoine Julien Meffre-Rouzan of New Orleans painted in Paris, 1833, in evening wear. The puffs at the shoulder of his coat are smaller than those worn in the 1820s, and his waistcoat has a slight point at the front waist.
5. 1834 portrait of Davy Crockett shows the fashionable dark cravat worn with a wide turn-over collar.
6. Portrait of John C. Calhoun in a sheer white formal cravat, dark coat, and fur-collared or lined overcoat, 1834.
7. Portrait of Hans Christian Andersen shows the depth and breadth of fashionable coat collars, 1836.
8. A gentleman of the Wilkes Family, 1838–40, wears a dark cravat. His tall coat collar is notched and spreads onto his shoulders. The sleeve has just a hint of fullness at the sleeve head.
9. Zoo proprietor Edward Cross wears a red and black patterned waistcoat with brown trousers and a black tailcoat, cravat, and top hat, 1838.

== Children's fashion ==
In this period, small boys wore sashed tunics over trousers, sometimes with a round-collared shirt underneath. By the 1830s the skeleton suit had fallen out of fashion. Older boys wore short jackets and trousers with round-collared shirts.

Girls wore simplified versions of women's fashion.

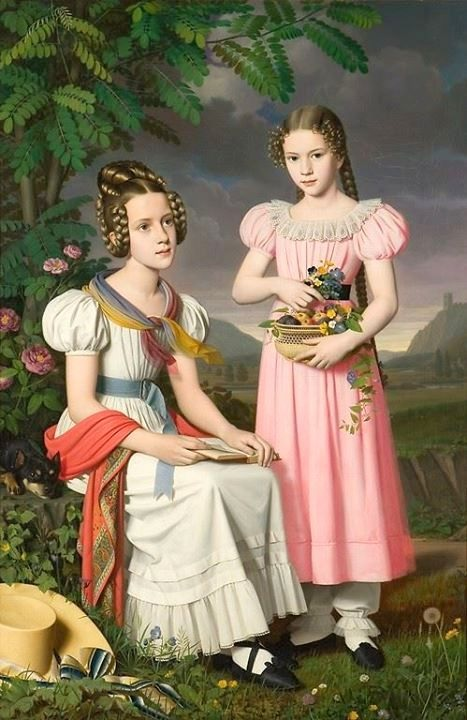
German girls, 1830

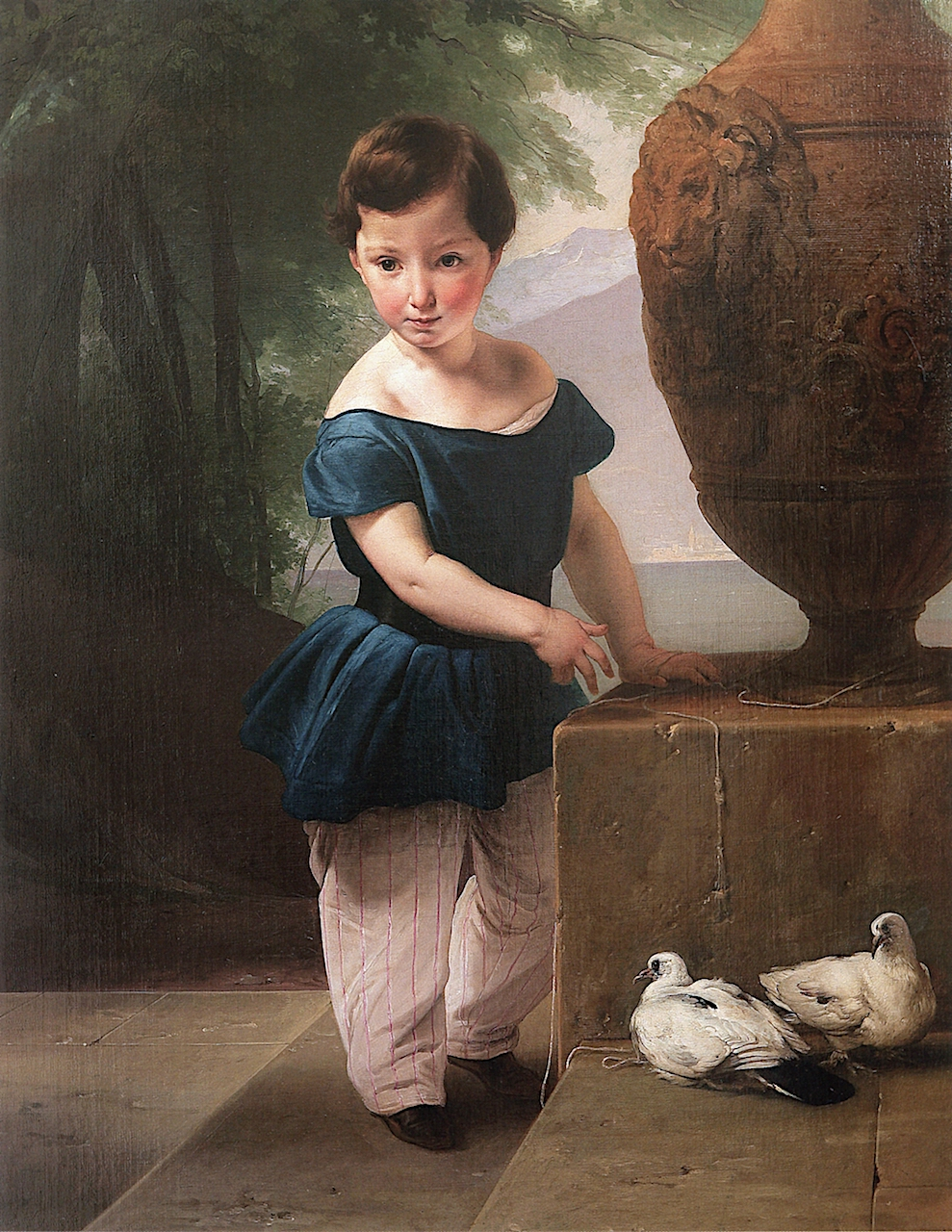
Spanish boy, 1830

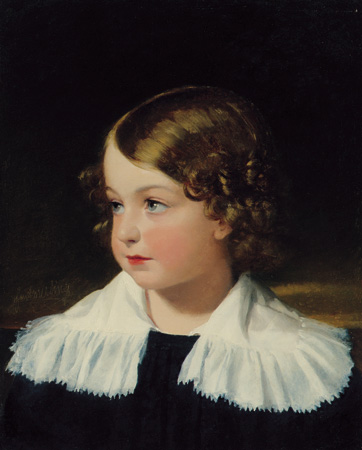
German boy, 1830

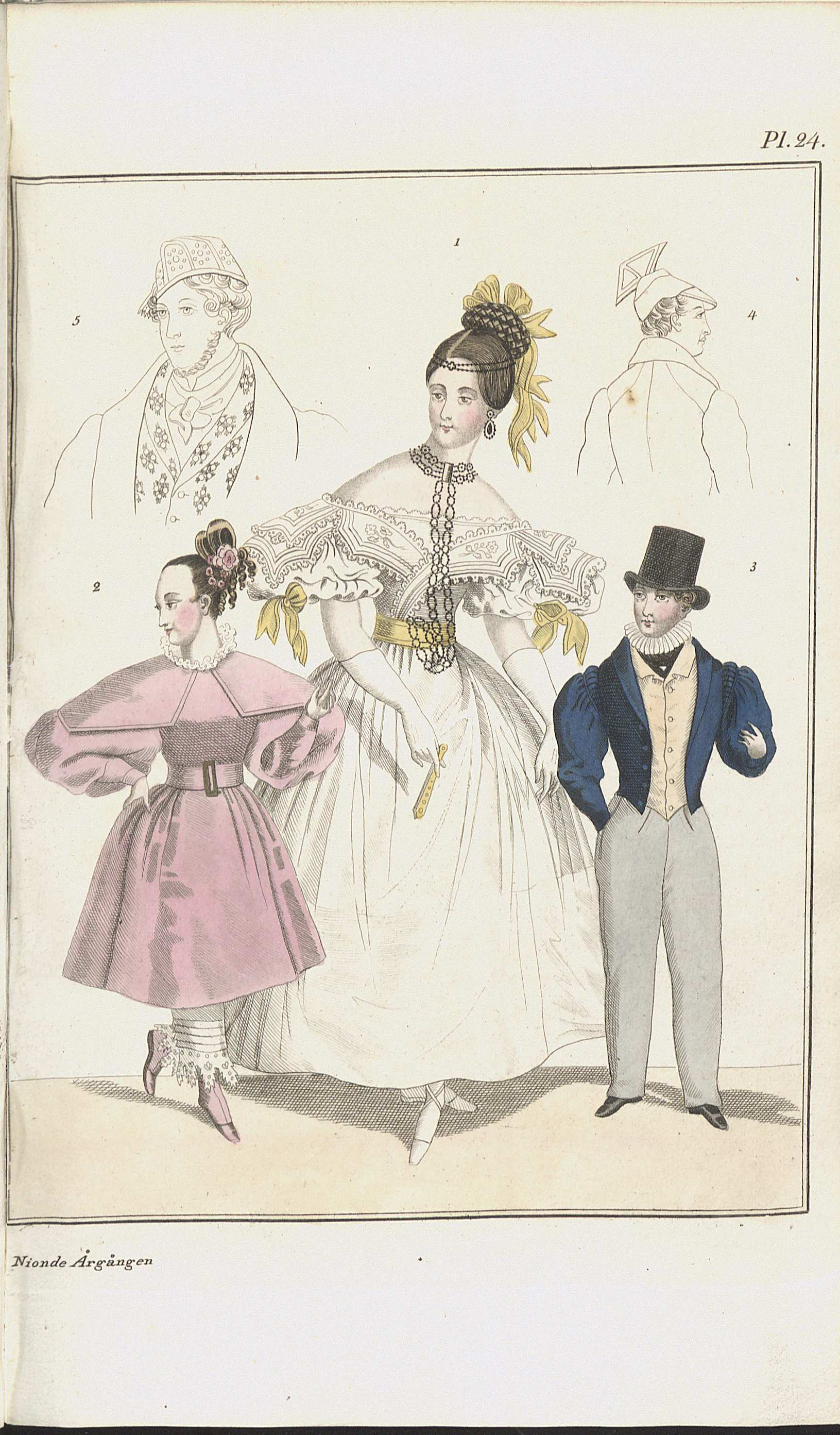
Swedish girl and boy, 1832

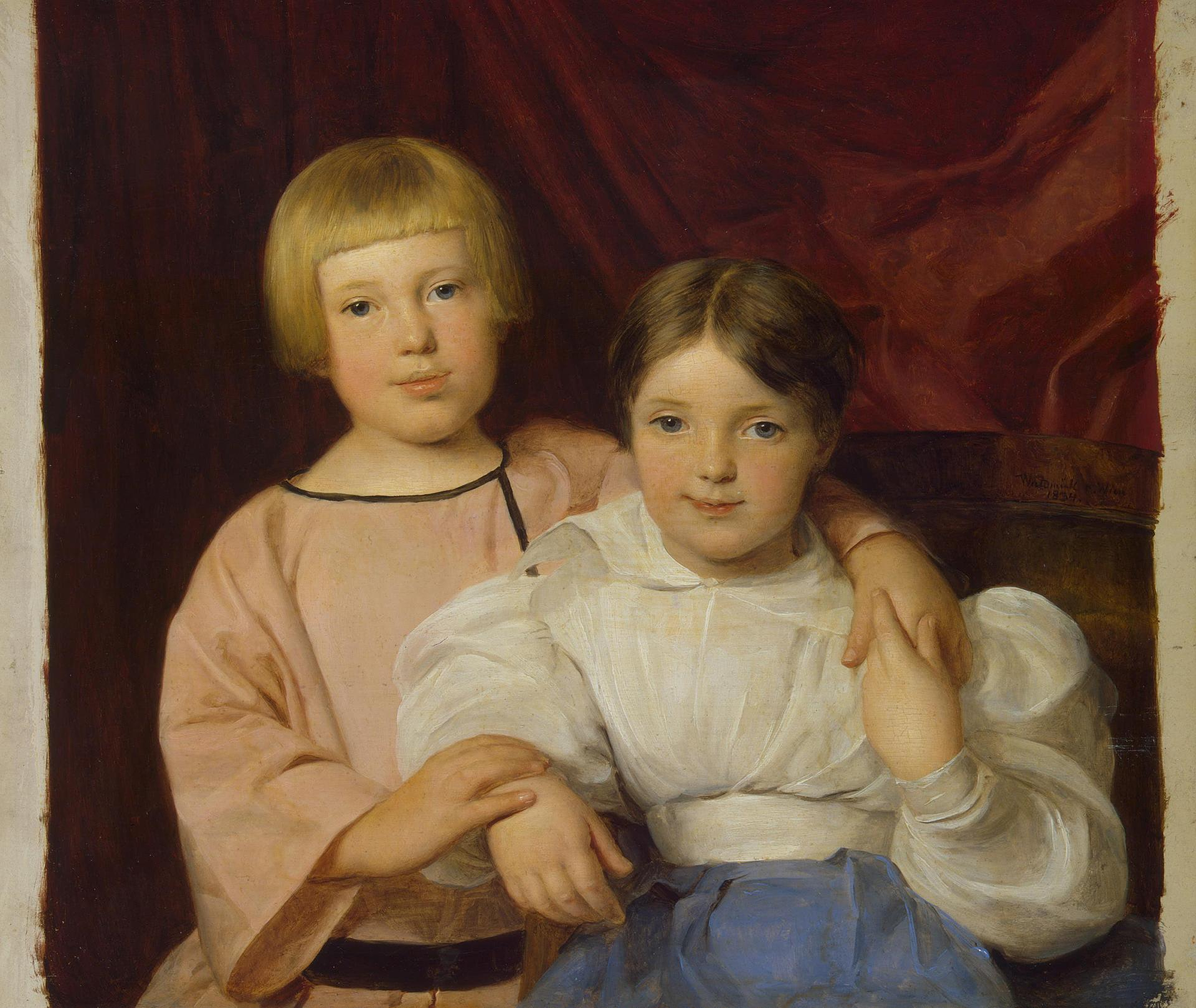
Austrian boy and girl, 1834

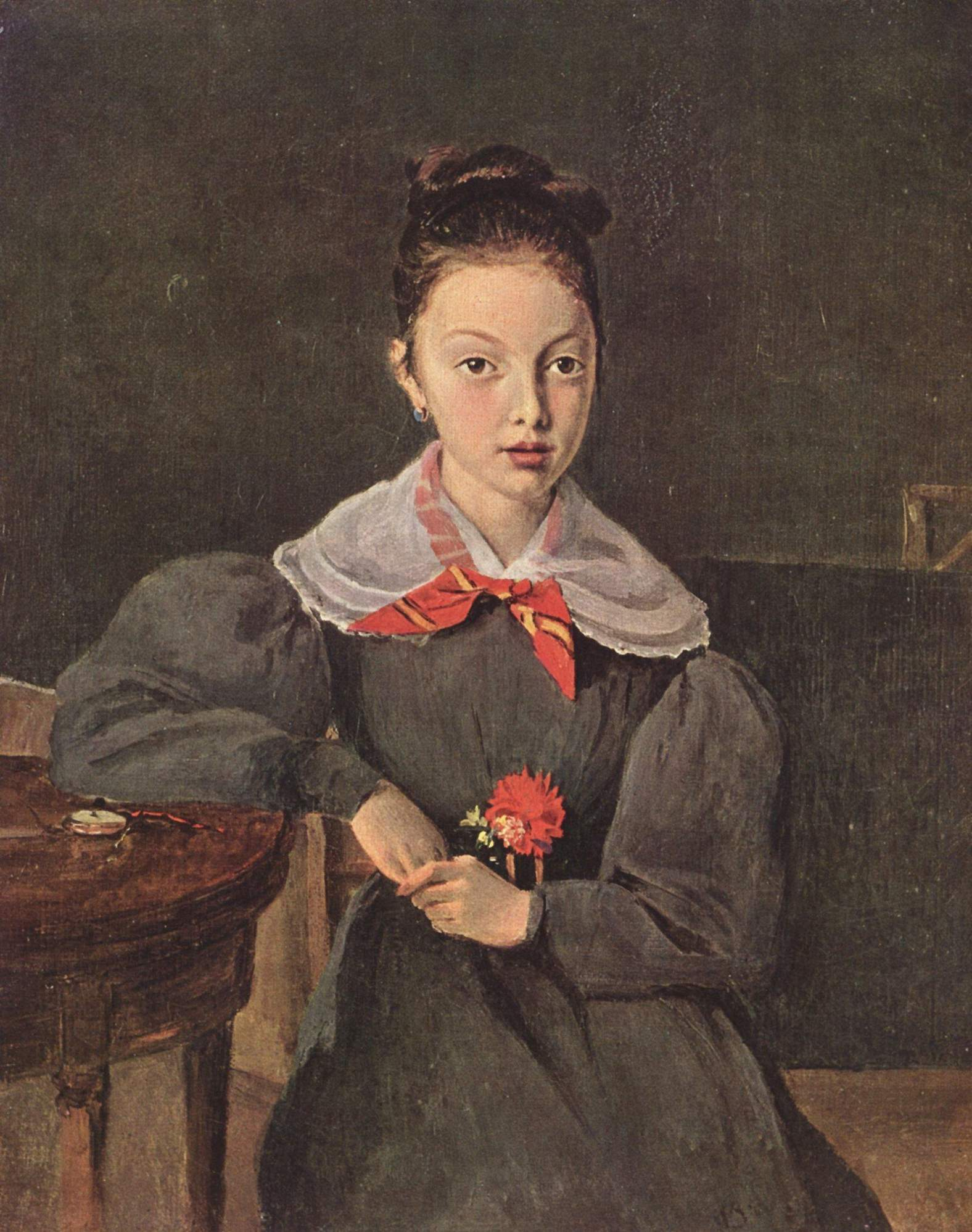
France, 1834

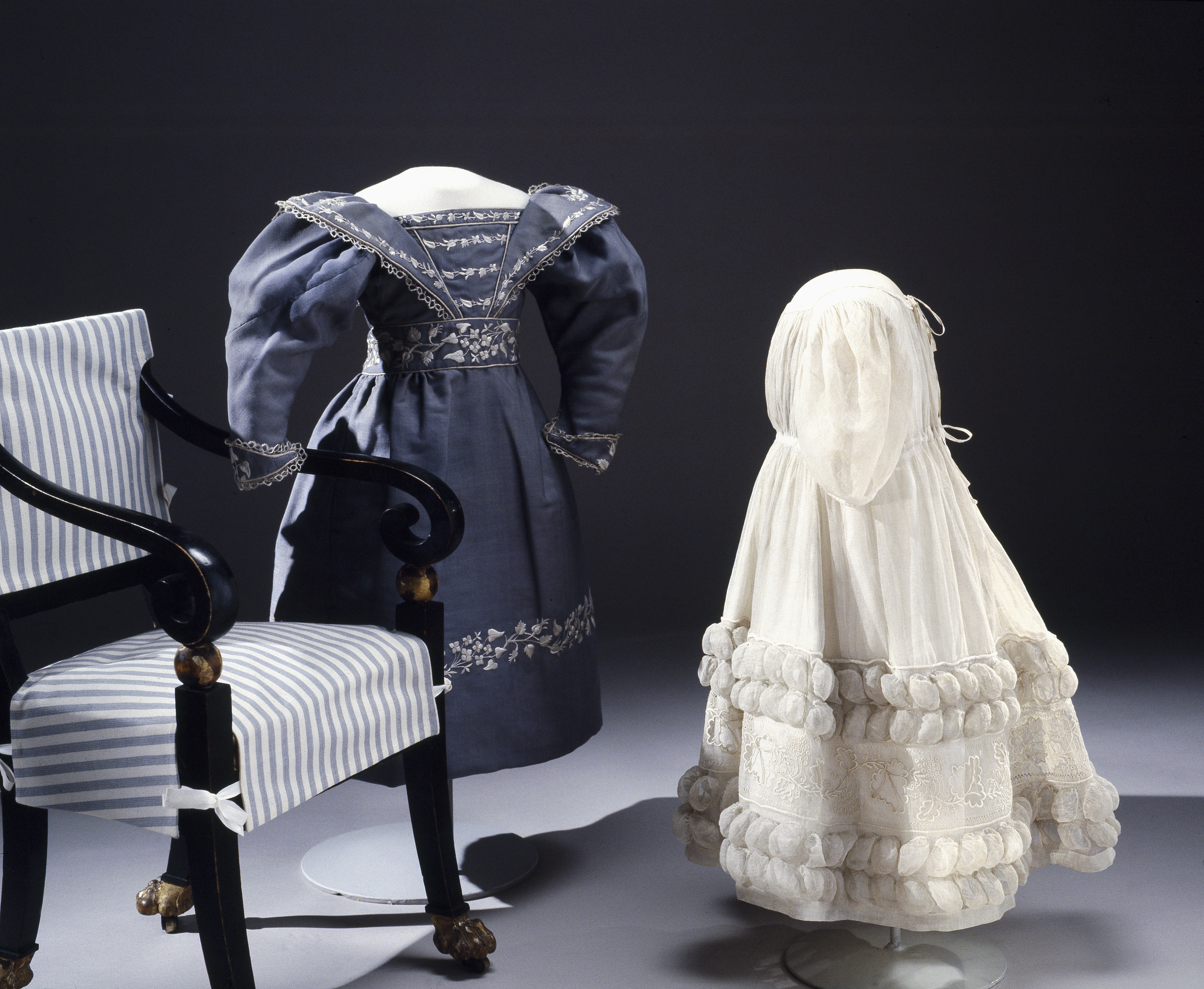
Girls dresses, 1835

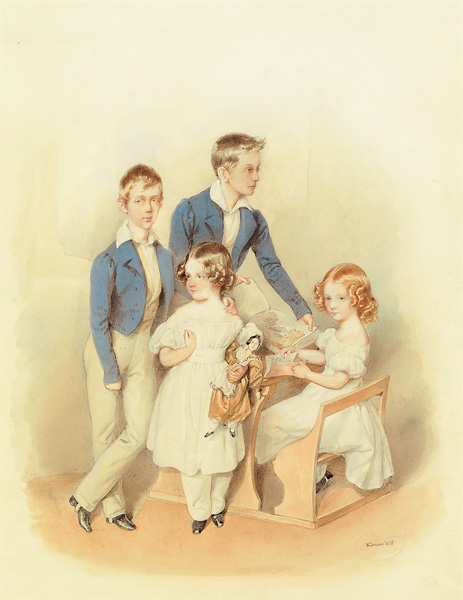
Germany, 1836

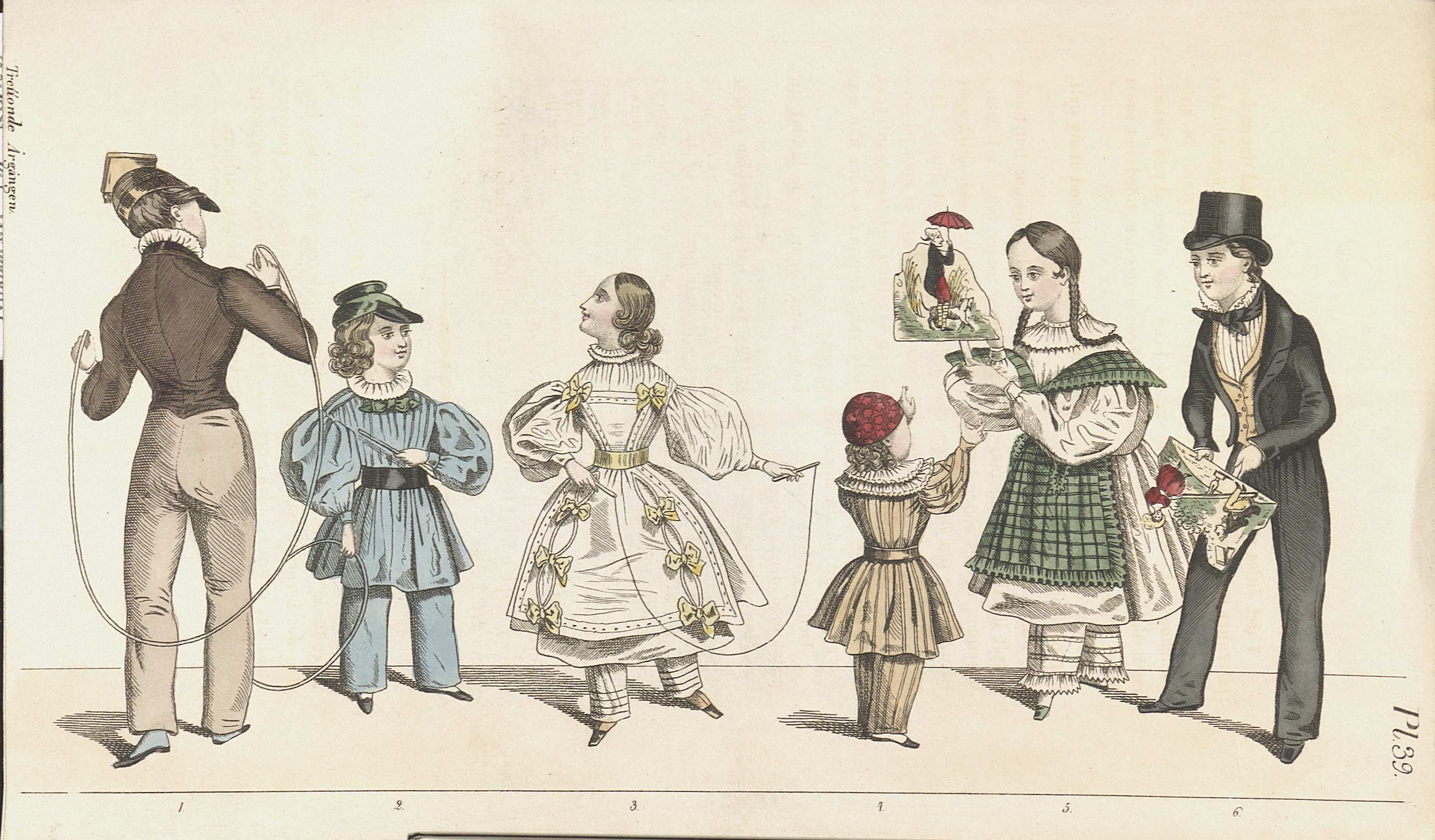
Young boys and girls, 1836

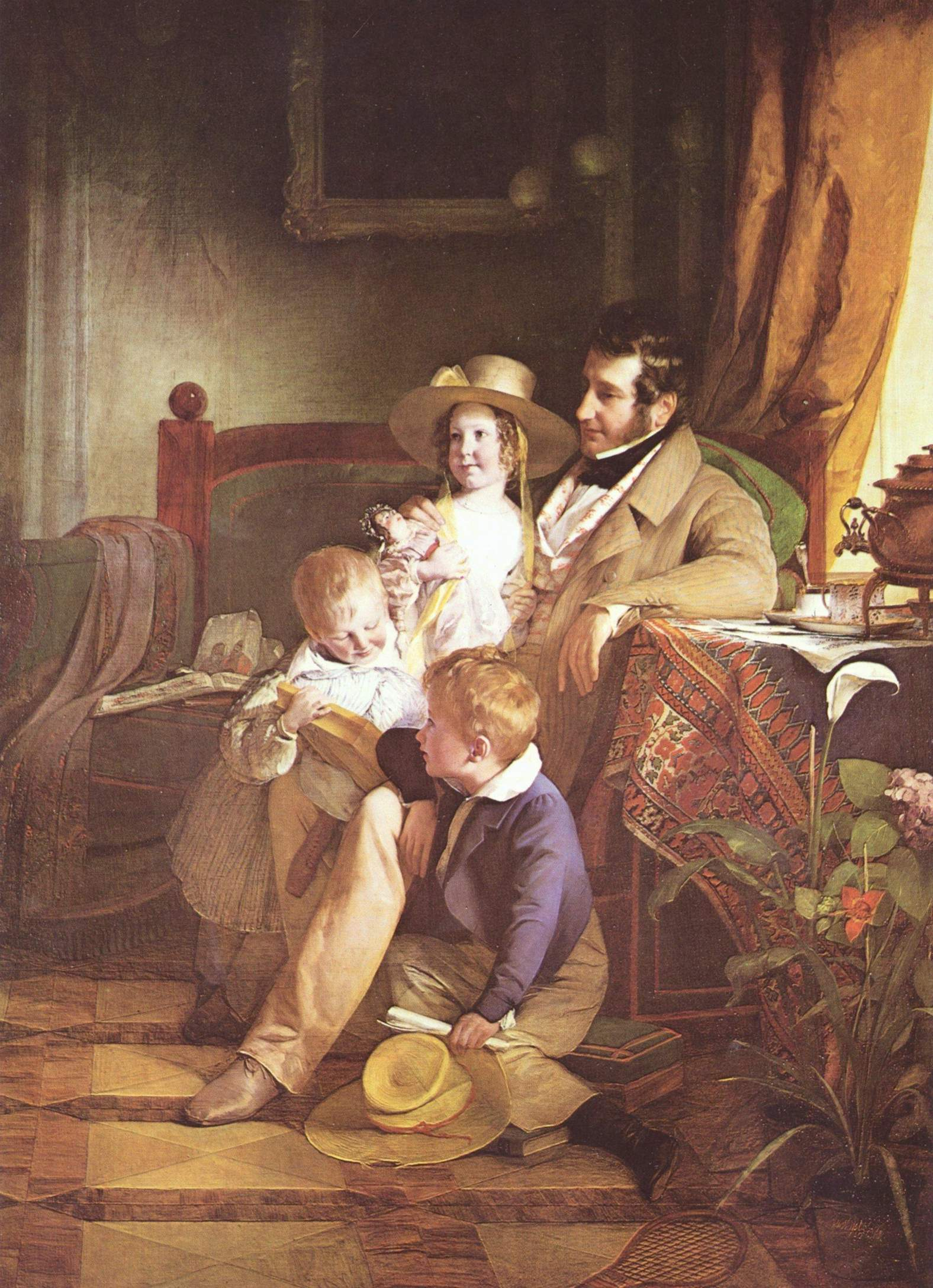
Germany, 1837

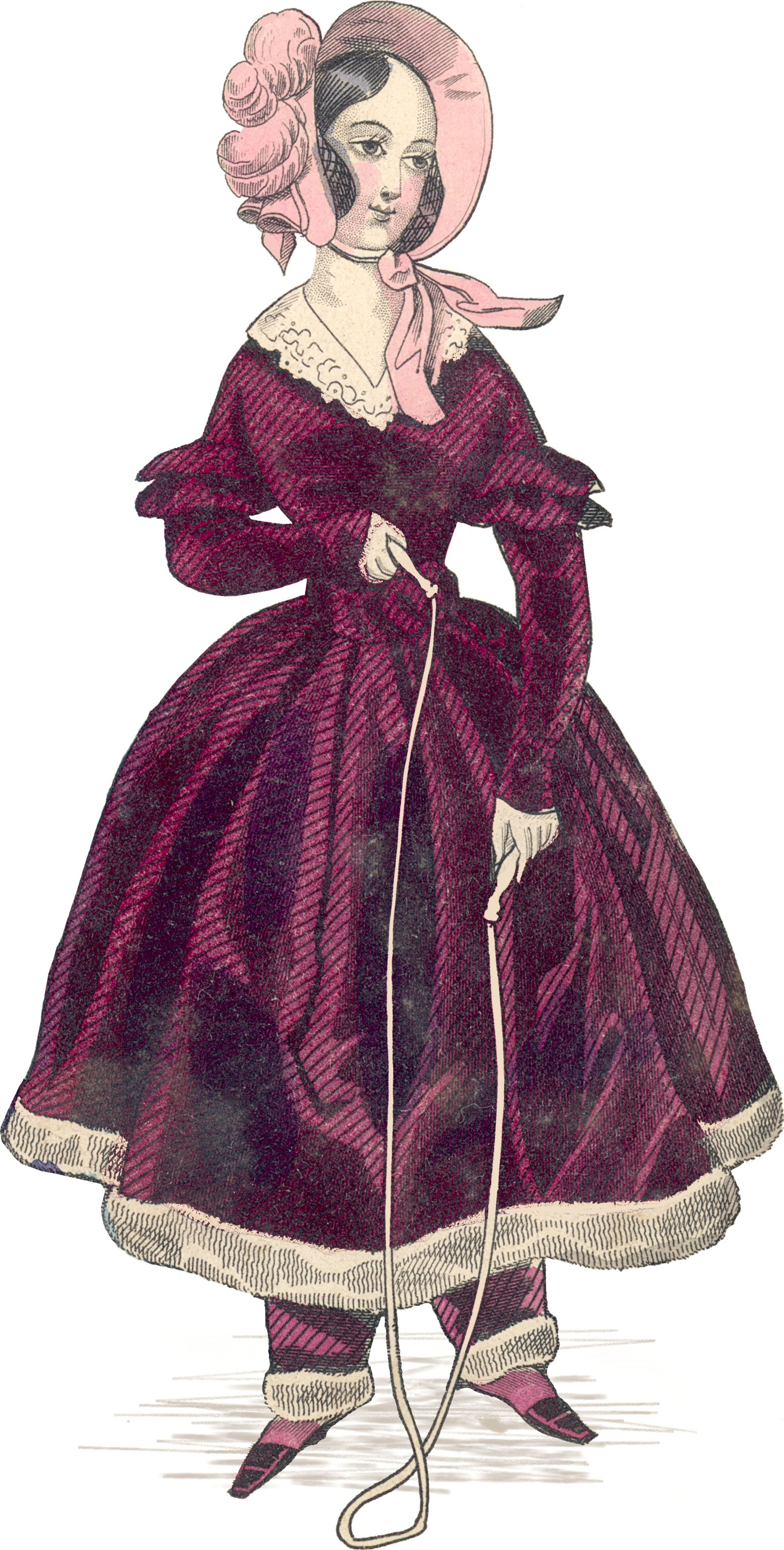
Young girl's frock with pantaloons, 1838

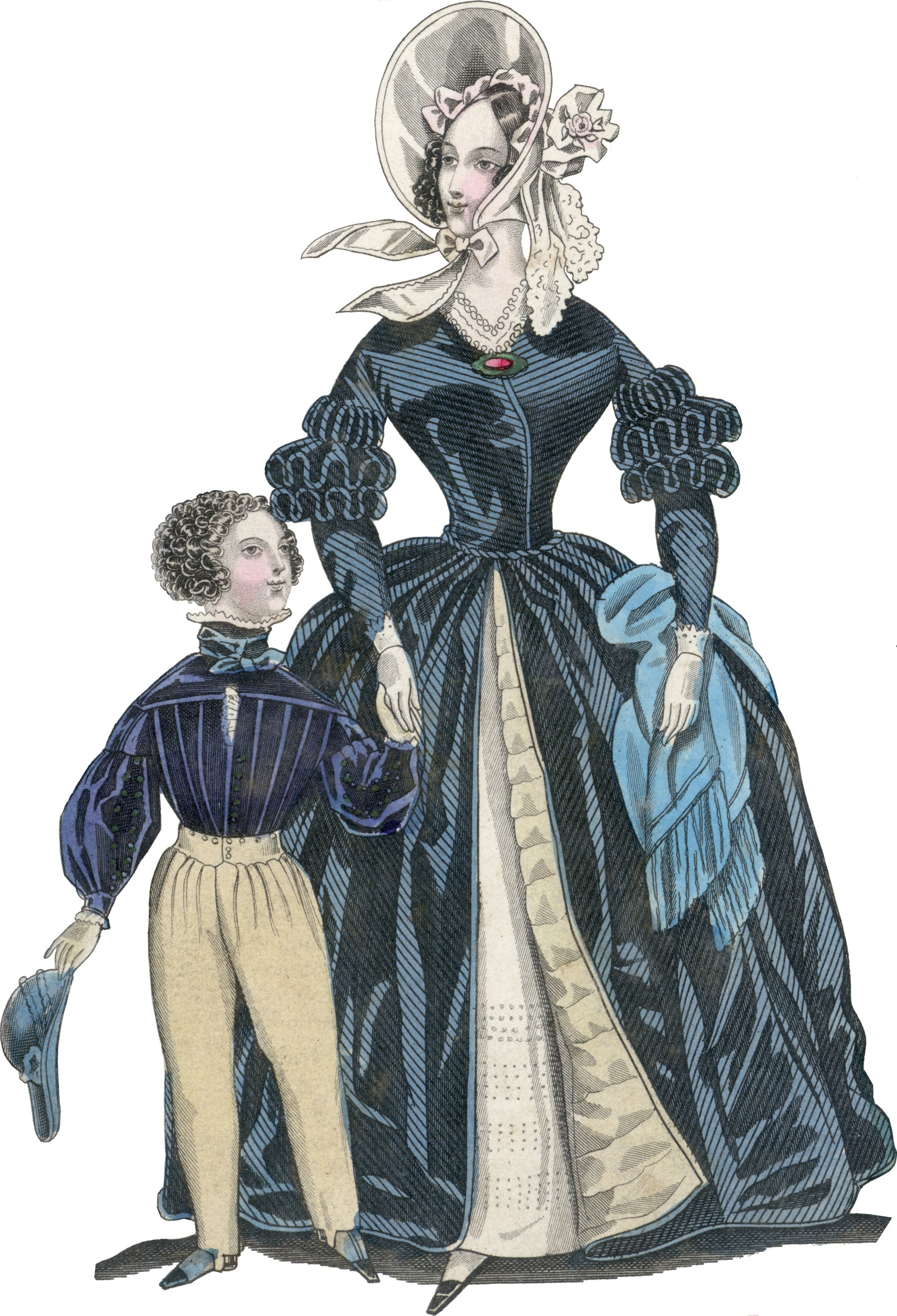
Young boy's suit, 1838

== Photographs ==
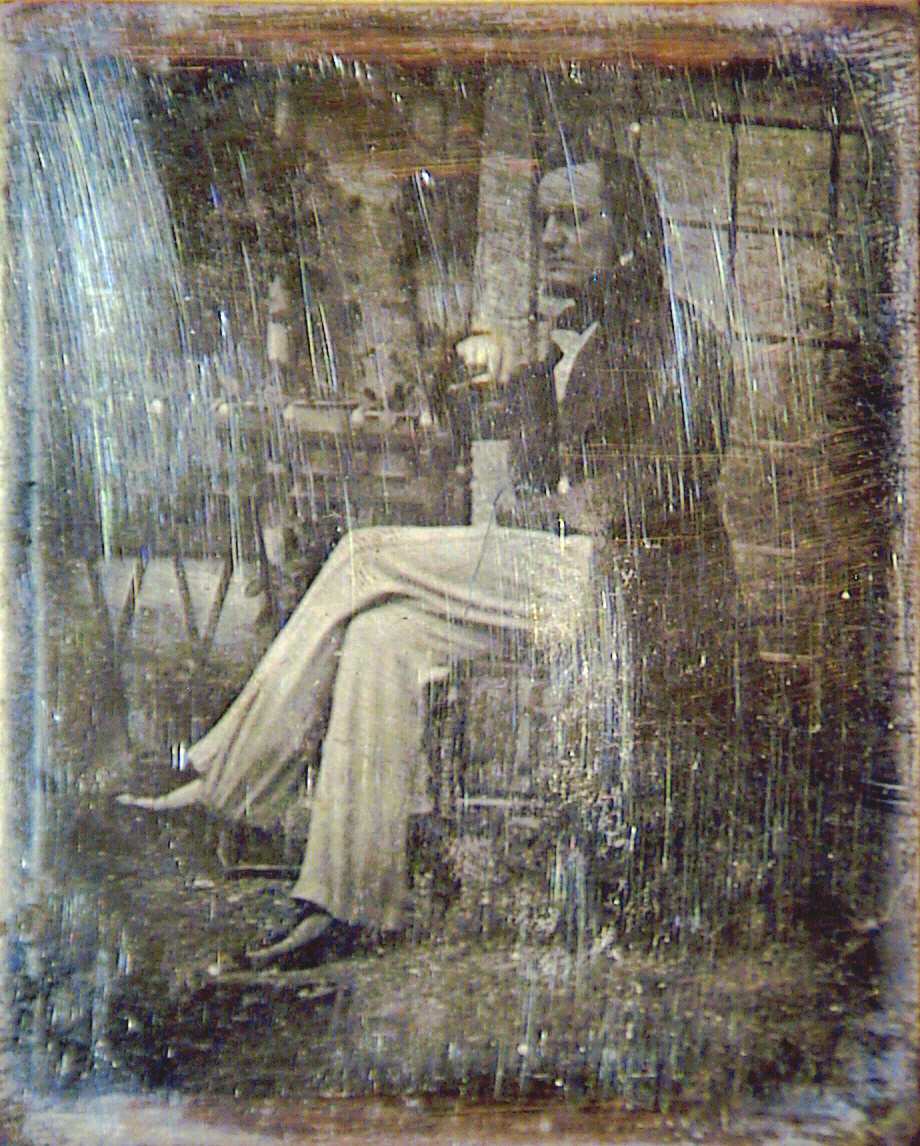
Daguerreotype of John William Draper, fall 1839

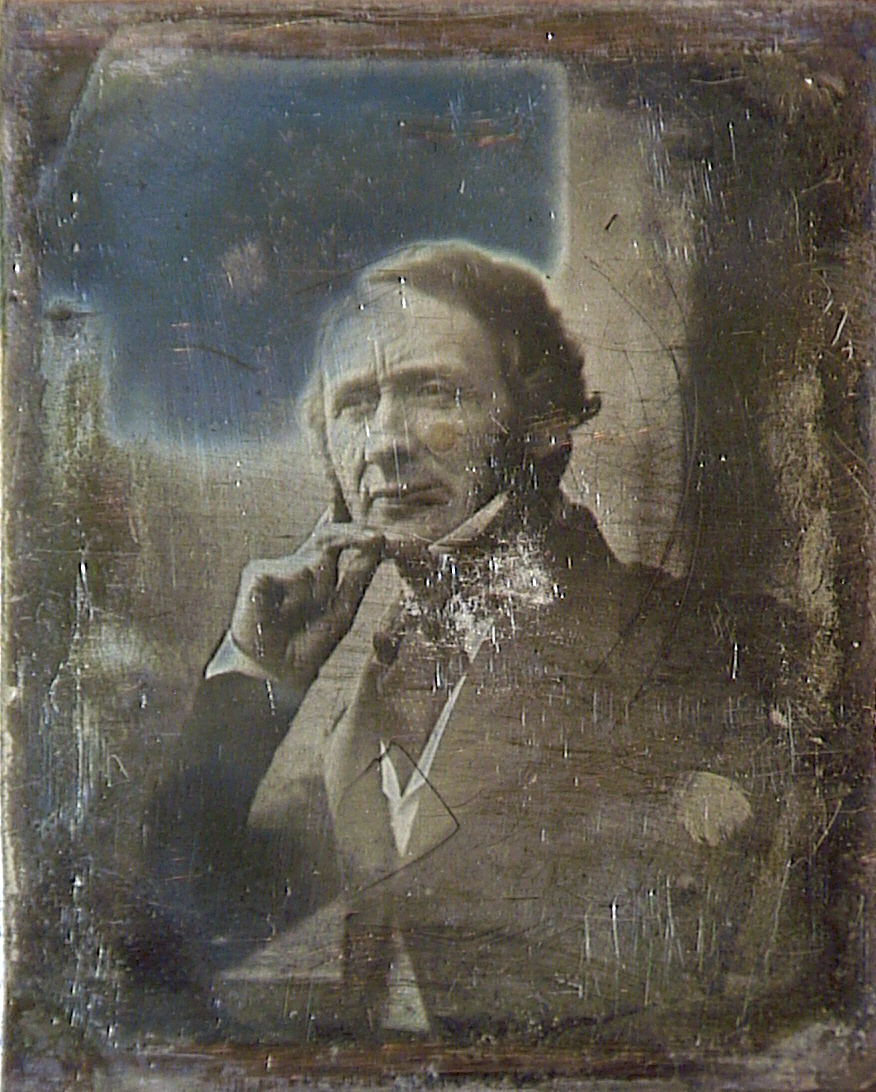
Samuel Morse photographed by John William Draper, fall 1839

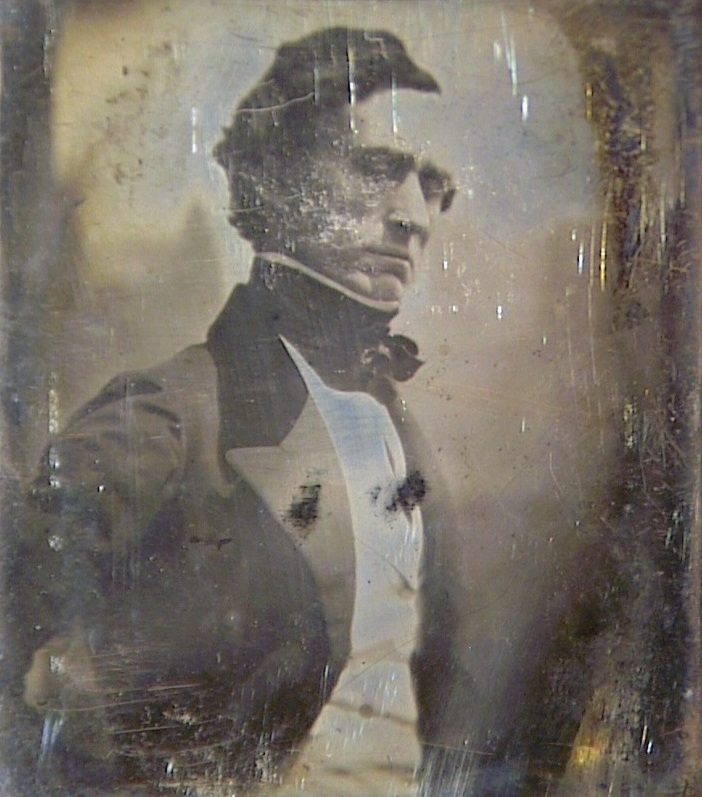
Theodore Frelinghuysen photographed by John William Draper, fall 1839

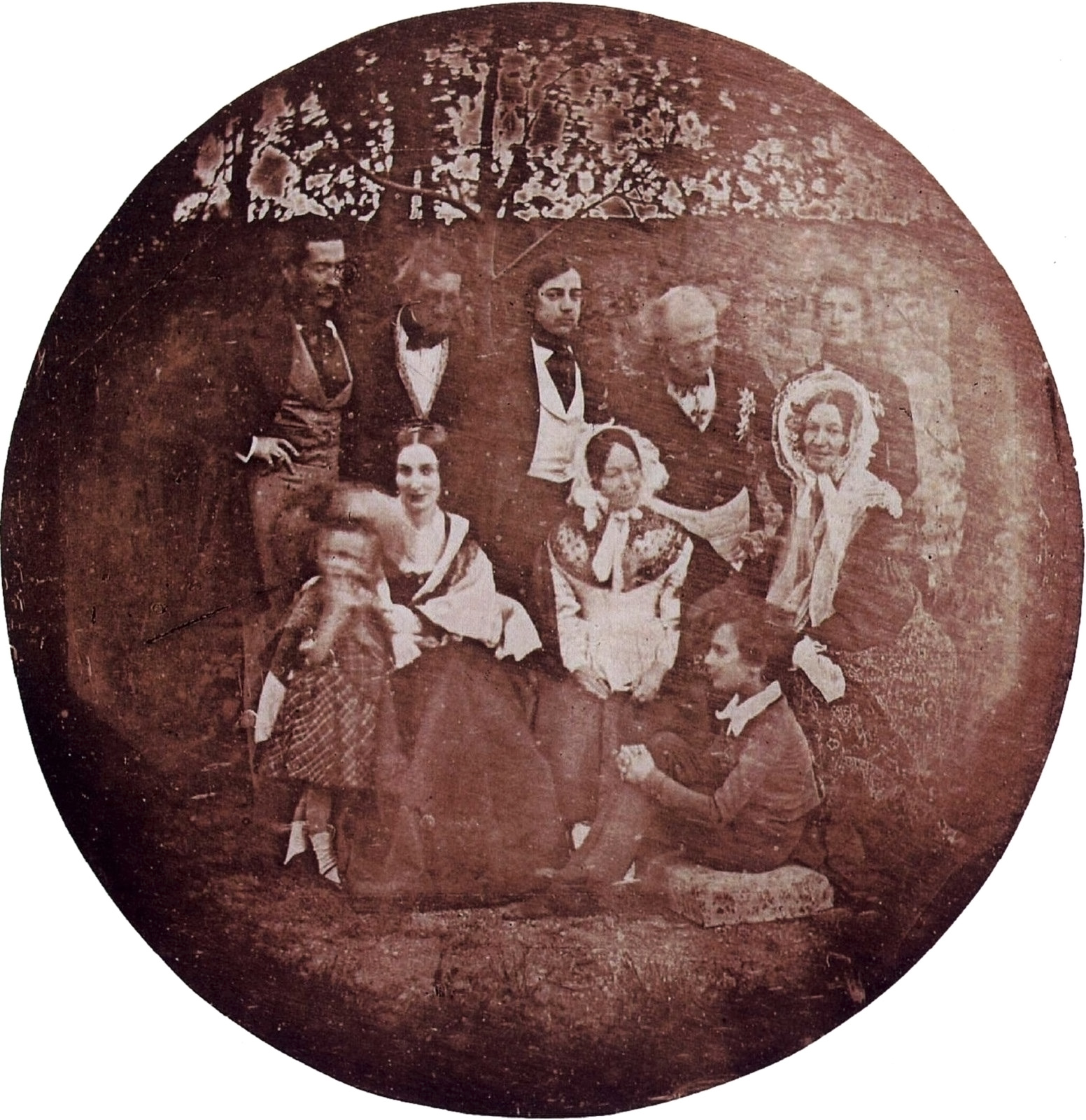
Karel Chotek with his family, November 1839

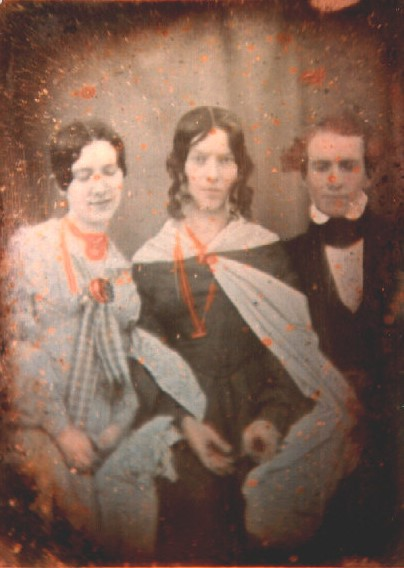
Dorothy Catherine Draper (center), December 1839.

== See also ==
- Victorian fashion
