= Peinetón =

Women's headdress in the 1830s in Buenos Aires and Montevideo

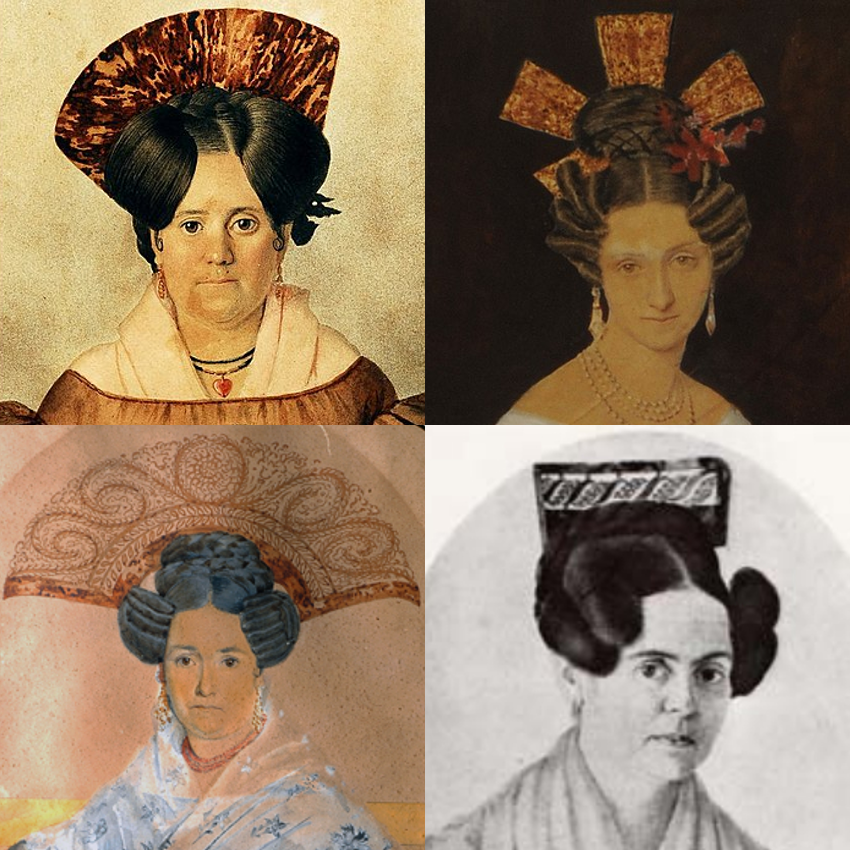
Elite women of Buenos Aires wearing a variety of different peinetones, portrayed by painter Charles Pellegrini between 1830 and 1832.

The peinetón (plural: peinetones) is a large, decorative comb that originated in Buenos Aires, Argentina and became very fashionable among its female inhabitants as well as those of Montevideo, Uruguay between the late 1820s and the mid to late 1830s. Although its origin can be traced back to the traditional Spanish peineta, the peinetón derived into a different headpiece altogether, both for its physical characteristics as well as for the symbolic meanings around its use. The peineta was introduced to Buenos Aires around 1815 and, as early as 1824, interest began to grow in larger and more elaborate models, eventually giving rise to the peinetón that had its heyday between 1830 and 1837. The accessory emerged during the Romantic era (Note: The Romantic era was a period of Western fashion history that took place between the mid 1820s and the mid 1830s, in which costume reflected the movement of the same name that was flourishing in literature, music and graphic arts. Romantic fashion was characterized by a rejection of the clean geometric lines and monochromatic palette of the Neoclassical look, in favor of an extravagant style consisting of multiple layers, colorful patterns and curvaceous shapes.) of Western fashion, and was worn alongside dresses with small waists and large, voluminous sleeves.

Peinetones were defined by their extravagant size, measuring up to 120 centimetres (3 feet 11 inches) in height and width at the height of their popularity. They were typically made out of tortoiseshell, although the cheaper horn was also common, particularly when the former was in short supply. The tortoiseshell was imported as pieces or plates, which were cut, heat-fused, fretworked, chiseled and polished by craftsmen in the city's workshops, sometimes also being printed and inlaid. The design of each peinetón was unique and tailored to the tastes of each woman. The one-piece accessory had a slightly convex body, it came in a variety of different shapes and featured profuse ornamentation with designs inspired by nature and Neoclassicism.

The trend was unique to the Río de la Plata, serving as a way to differentiate from Spanish culture and becoming a defining feature of porteño women for both locals and foreigners. As such, it represents a moment of interest for Argentine fashion historians, and is associated with a growing sense of national identity in post-colonial Argentina, which had declared independence in 1816 and was undergoing a series of bloody civil wars between Federalists and Unitarians. The development of the fashion mainly took place during the rule of the Federalist Juan Manuel de Rosas, a time in which clothing became increasingly codified to demonstrate political adherence to the regime. In fact, the use of the peinetón was eventually associated with Federalist women, with models often featuring effigies of Rosas and political slogans of the party.

The peinetón had a great impact on the porteño society of the time, which led to an intense literary, graphic, artistic and journalistic production both for and against the accessory. Due to the high cost of tortoiseshell and its elaborate manufacture, the headpiece became a luxury item that served as a symbol of prestige among the elite, although women of lower social classes also aspired to own one. Several modern authors consider that the peinetón served as a way for women to burst in and reaffirm themselves in public space, at a time when they were heavily relegated to domestic life.

== Name and characteristics ==
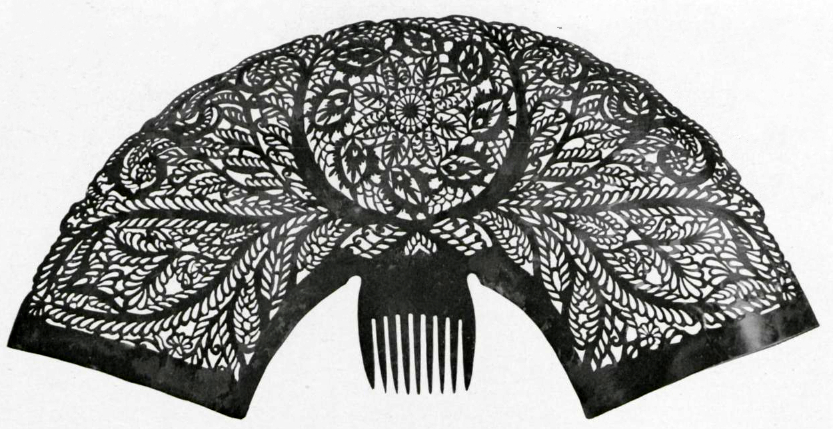
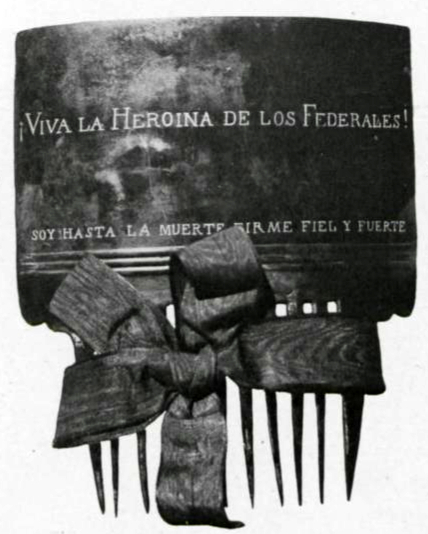
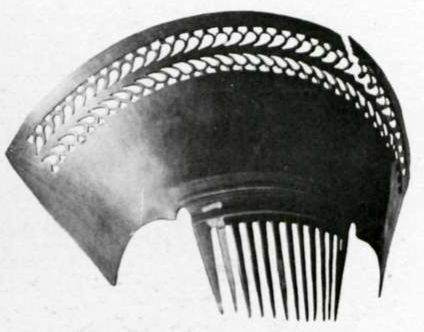
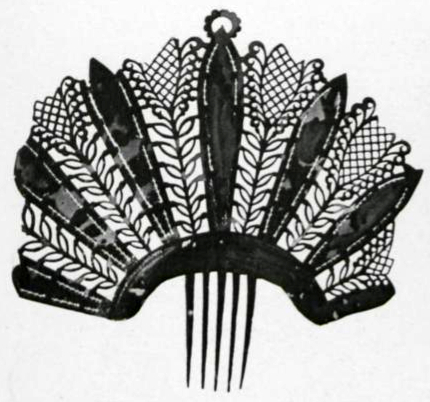
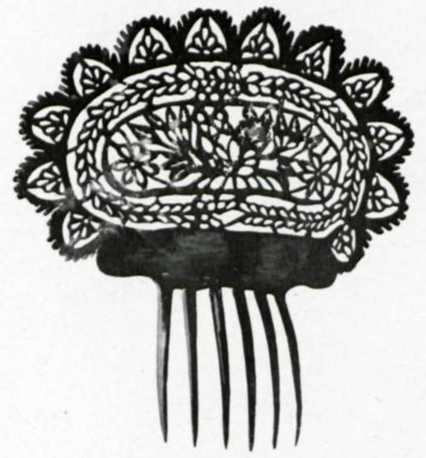
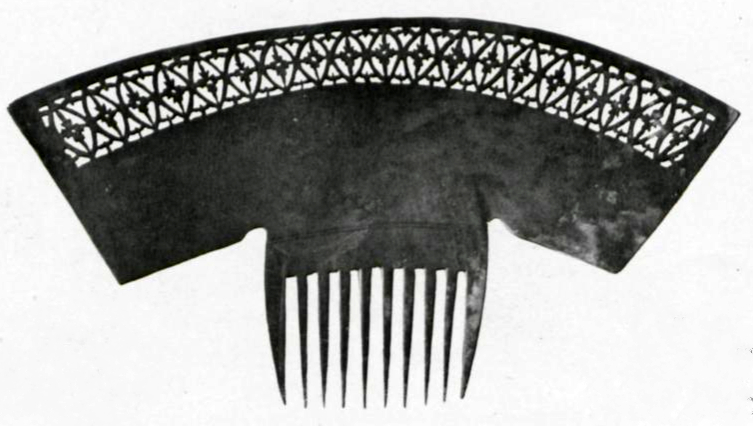
Peinetones of various shapes and styles of ornamentation photographed in 1927 for a report in Plus Ultra, a monthly supplement of Caras y Caretas magazine. The model on the upper right displays Federalist slogans, including an exaltation of Encarnación Ezcurra.

The peinetón is a one-piece headdress with a slightly convex body, with both sides fretworked and profusely decorated. It is made up of two well-differentiated parts: the comb, which fulfills the functional role of securing the peinetón to the hair, and the field, the visible area that features the ornamentation. According to fashion historian Regina A. Root, peinetones "could have from six to fourteen teeth and weigh 1.65 pounds (750 grams)". They were typically made out of tortoiseshell, although the cheaper bull's horn was also used, particularly when the former was in short supply. Ivory, nacre and silver were also used to a lesser extent. In the General Archive of the Nation there are numerous inventories of pulperías where peinetones made of talco (lit. 'talc') are also mentioned. There are no known references as to the material they are referring to, although it may have been some kind of plaster.

The term peinetón comes from peineta (a traditional Spanish headpiece), which itself comes from peine (English: "comb"). The word originated in Argentina and is unlikely to be found in Spanish-language dictionaries, such as the Royal Spanish Academy's Diccionario de la lengua española, which only includes the word peineta. It is an augmentative, resulting from adding the suffix -ón to the word peineta. According to Root, peinetón "might translate into English as something more elaborate than a 'grandiose comb'."

The accessory was called peineta and peinetón interchangeably, while the local English-language newspaper The British Packet, and Argentine News simply used the word "comb" for both. According to the written and iconographic sources of the time, the peineta had fallen into disuse during the popularity of the peinetón, so it is understood that when they use the word peineta they are actually referring to the peinetón. However, today these two names are well differentiated by Argentine modern museum cataloging, which defines the categories of peineta (measuring less than 28 cm.), small peinetones (measuring between 28 and 35 cm.) and peinetones (measuring more than 35 cm.).

According to their shape, historian Horacio Botalla classified peinetones as oval, bell-shaped, rod-shaped and trapezoidal, with the first two being the ones that "allowed for more narrative designs". Judging by the lithographs of the time, most women opted for the trapeze-like style. In terms of ornamentation, Botalla pointed out that they include plant and animal motifs typical of Neoclassicism. For her part, researcher Serafina Perri differentiated the French neoclassical style from the "organic" style. The former includes "pearls, frets, meanders, lozenges, ovas, waves, palmettes, scrolls, grids, ribbons, loops, spirals, seed beads, feathers, glasses, baskets, musical instruments, acanthus leaves, firebrands, Phrygian caps, initials, inscriptions and names"; while the latter represents "elements taken from nature, phytomorph motifs, leaves and flowers, roses, daisies, sunflowers, poppies, even a tree of life (in [Buenos Aires'] Saavedra Museum collection) and zoomorphs, butterflies, birds and dragonflies."

== Origin ==
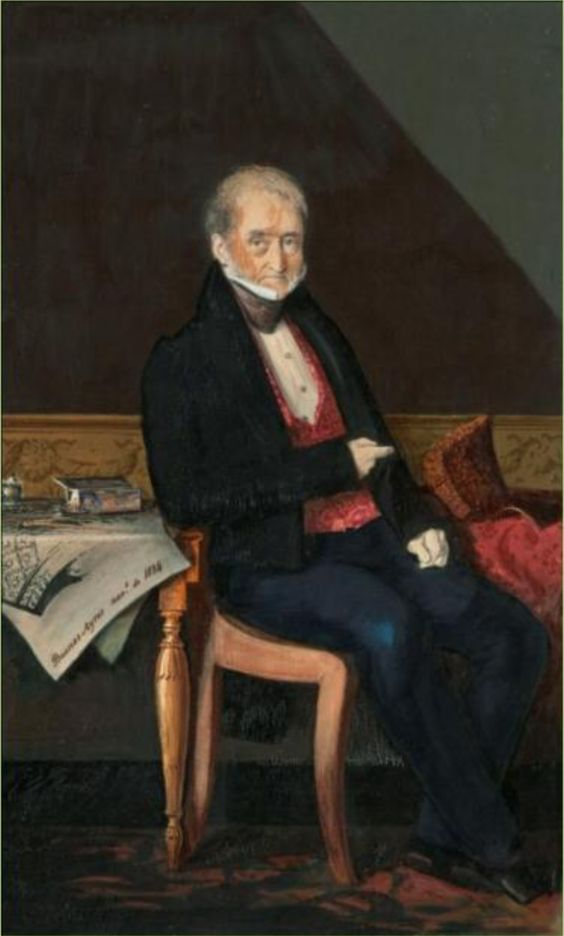
Charles Pellegrini. Mr. Manuel Mateo Masculino López, c. 1834. Masculino was the most prominent and influential peinetón manufacturer. This portrait is a sign of his resulting economic prosperity, and depicts him next to an unfolded plan of one of his creations.

There are not enough sources to determine when the peinetón emerged or if it had an inventor. Its origin is commonly attributed to manufacturer Manuel Mateo Masculino, including fashion sociologist Susana Saulquin in her 2006 book Historia de la moda argentina. Nevertheless, other authors have rejected the idea that a single designer invented the peinetón, with researcher Susan Hallstead pointing out that it "was a product established and made popular by elite females, for females." For her part, Root also told Página/12 in 2013: "We cannot affirm that Masculino was the creator of the peineton as we know it, but it is clear that he was its major disseminator. It is most likely that the peinetón was a creation of the market and competition." Masculino was responsible for many of the most popular designs for the accessory and quickly promoted himself in the press when he launched new models.

Masculino was born in 1797 in Spain and arrived to Buenos Aires in 1823, as local newspaper Argos de Buenos Aires stated on April 16 of that year: "Manuel Masculino, manufacturer of ivory combs and tortoiseshell peinetas of various tastes, has arrived in this city to stay. Masculino offers the machines of his invention for mass production of combs." It can be inferred that he also lived for some time in Montevideo, since his children María and Encarnación Masculino were born there in 1830 and 1831 respectively. Masculino opened his first store in 1825—two years after his arrival to Buenos Aires—and was soon imitated by other businessmen such as Custodio Peis, Martín Suárez and Salvador Videla.

Its origin goes back to the traditional Spanish peineta, which was introduced to the Río de la Plata around 1815.

As early as 1824, a special interest in creating and crafting ever larger and more extravagant peinetas began.

Some modern authors point out that the peinetón actually derived from the tall and ornate hairstyles that appeared in French fashion plates, including the chignon style and the tortoiseshell combs known as peigne "a la girafe". These combs became popular in Paris in 1827, after the giraffe Zarafa—a gift from Muhammad Ali of Egypt to King Charles X of France—arrived to Paris and unleashed a fashion influenced by the animal, including hairstyles. Nevertheless, the accessory was more likely a synthesis of both the Spanish and French styles, with Hallstead describing it as a result of transculturation and an "Argentine product that reconciles complete cultural independence and blatant imitation." She further noted that:

While the peinetón was not derived from any indigenous article of clothing, it was however, a product formed from several exterior sources (particularly Spanish and French) and modified in the Argentine context. Perhaps the peinetón could best be understood as an Argentine example of "selective appropriation" [...] whereby certain markers or products considered "modern" (because of their West European origins) are appropriated by colonial and post-colonial peripheries in an attempt to "appear" transformed while maintaining—or in the case of Argentina, creating—a certain sense of individuality from colonial imposition.

== Production and manufacture ==
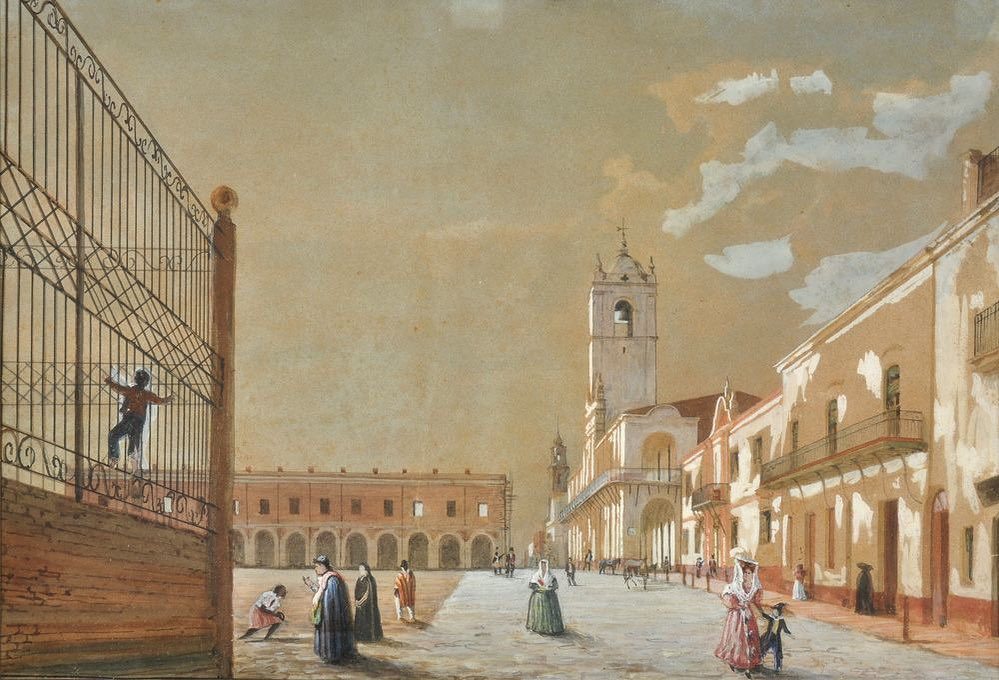
View of the Plaza de la Victoria—today the Plaza de Mayo—as depicted by Charles Pellegrini in 1831. The peinetón business was concentrated in the commercial area surrounding the square, which was the central axis of the city.

The production of the peinetón was concentrated in the commercial area located in the surroundings of the Plaza de la Victoria (known today as the Plaza de Mayo), the main axis of the city. There were located the businesses dedicated exclusively to the sale of peinetones, as well as those that had other items but still sold the accessory. Peinetones could be bought directly from the manufacturers in their factory or in their commercial premises, but also in multi-purpose and convenience stores and, in their heyday, it is recorded that they were even sold in a furniture store and in a crockery store.

Although it cannot be certain that the peinetón involved an industrial mode of production, some elements may suggest it, including the large volume of production, the division of labour and the use and improvement of machinery that would allow greater production in less time. A large number of combs were exported abroad, as indicated by the records of cargo ships published in The British Packet, and Argentine News, an English-language weekly newspaper edited by the British community in Buenos Aires. In fact, Perri suggests that the peinetón could be considered the first Argentine manufacture to be exported, contradicting the widespread idea that this did not happen until the arrival of the so-called "agro-export model" (Note: The agro-export model (Spanish: "modelo agroexportador") is the name given to the period of Argentine economic history from the end of the 19th century to the Great Depression of the 1930s, during which Argentina was fundamentally inserted in the world market through the export of agricultural products, being the period of greatest economic growth in the country.) decades later:

If we consider that at that time all exports consisted exclusively of raw materials, tallow, jerky, ostrich feathers, dried cow skins, chinchilla, otter, wood, antlers, sugar, salt, etc., this export is an extraordinary fact because it was the first Argentine manufactured product to be sent abroad long before the so-called agro-export model of the late 19th century promoted the export of frozen meat and wheat as the only production that could be exported. This model did not take into account, did not recognize or did not care to consider that a manufactured product, the peinetón, could have been shipped abroad long before refrigerated meat in 1868. The result of this divorce could be the best explanation for the absence of the peinetón from the list of technical productions, the most significant activities of the city, artisanal productions, small industries or artistic creations.

The manufacture of a peinetón was a laborious process that involved skilled artisans. According to historian Alejo González Garaño, the workers that manufactured the peinetón were lower-class black slaves or freedmen—including women and children—who were trained in the trade and many times "turned out to be eminent craftsmen as chiselers, engravers, color enamellers, setters, draughtsmen, etc." Likewise, Perri claims that peinetón fabrication was "divided by caste: free Spaniards and mulatos became workshop bosses or foremen, black slaves or freedmen including women and children carried out the manufacture." She cited a notice signed by Juan Bracco, a comb manufacturer based at 214 Cuyo street, who requested "(…) 1 or 2 young people of color come down to teach him the trade."

The fabrication included various phases: boiling, melting, fusing, making the comb, hand molding and polishing. The material arrived in pieces or sheets already cast, which were then cut and fused in the workshops. To do this, the artisans boiled the pieces in salt water to soften them, and then fused them by welding the resulting plates by applying pressure.

== Usage and depictions ==
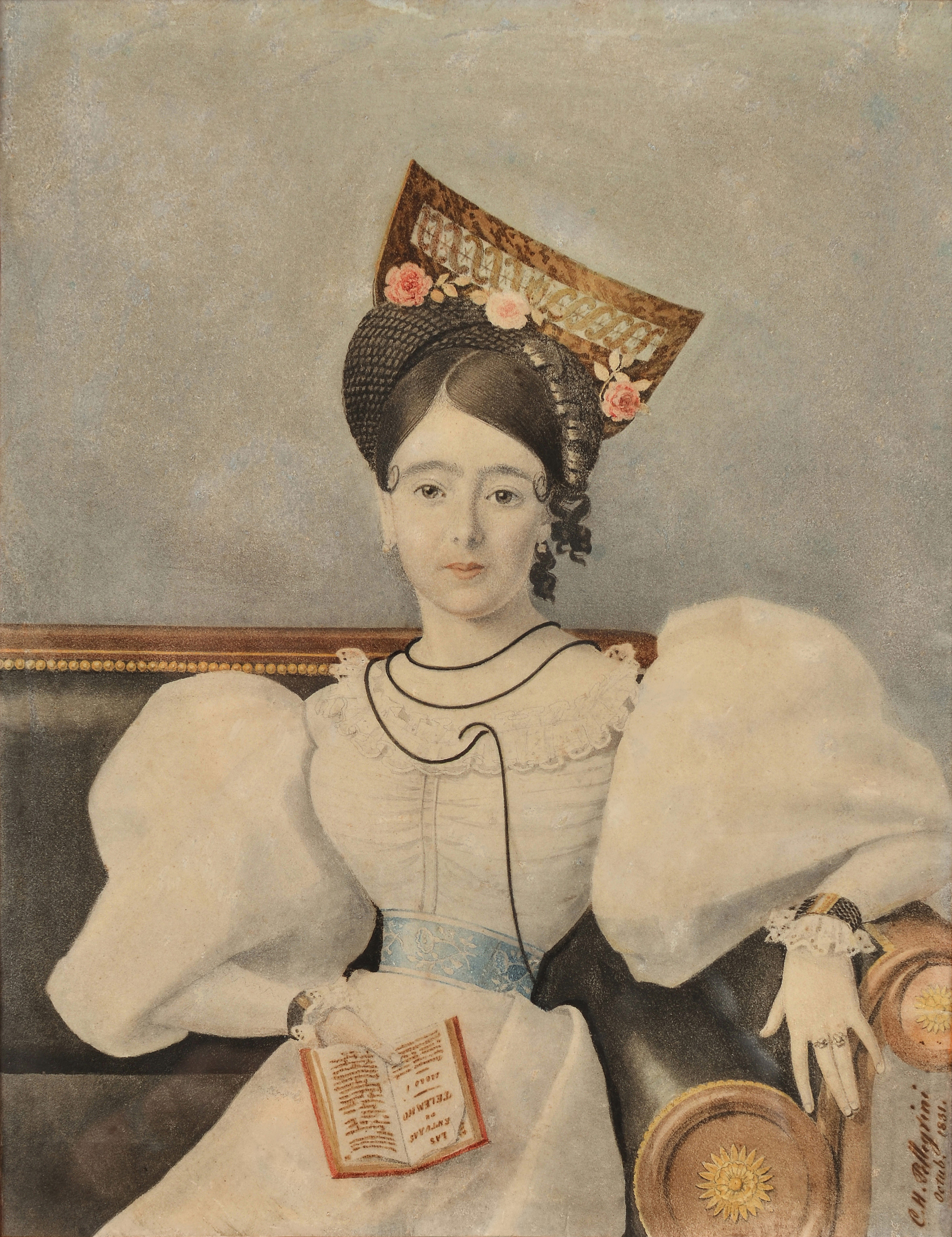
Charles Pellegrini. Mrs. Lucía Carranza de Rodríguez Orey, 1831.

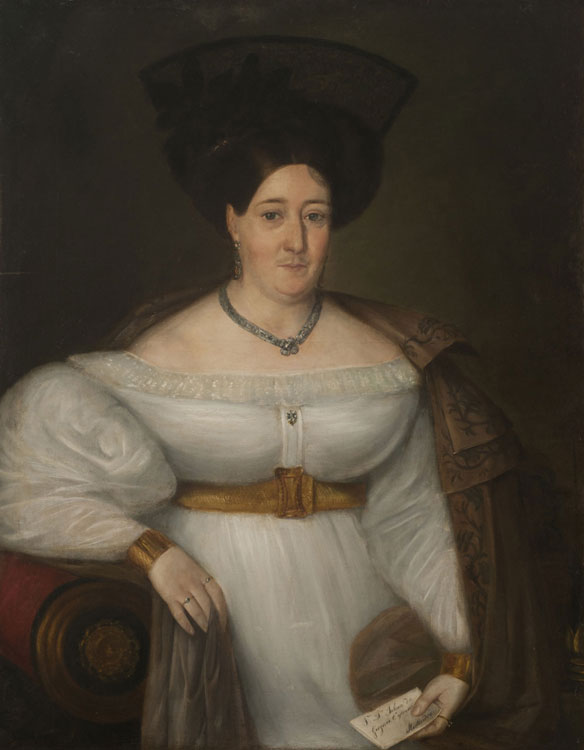
Jacobo Fiorini. Mrs. Candelaria Somellera de Espinoza, c. 1830–1834.

In these portrait paintings, two elite women of Buenos Aires share the same style of Romantic-era fashion, despite their age difference, wearing white dresses with large, voluminous sleeves and a small waist. What differentiates them is the arrangement of their hair and the size of their peinetón.

As tortoiseshell was an expensive imported raw material, it is generally accepted that the peinetón was a luxury item whose use was reserved for elite women. However, some fashion historians like Saulquin and Root argue that the peinetón was used by women of all social classes. The latter points out that one of the first lithographs published by César Hipólito Bacle shows an Afro-Argentine woman wearing the headpiece while going to a pulpería. Nevertheless, Root also noted that the peinetón remained inaccessible to many and cited a section from the popular gazette La Gaucha, which documented the feelings of an impoverished street vendor who aspired to be able to buy a peinetón to wear at the patriotic celebrations on May 25.

The use of the peinetón was a local addition to the over-the-top fashion of the Romantic era,, a period noted for its highly elaborate hairstyles. Porteño women's fashion of the period was based on French styles, with women wearing their peinetón alongside dresses with small waists and large, voluminous sleeves. The growth of the peinetón accompanied in a proportionate way that of the sleeves and the skirts (extended with multiple layers of superimposed petticoats), which "transformed the ladies into true walking hourglasses." According to iconographic sources, most dresses were pink, red, brown, pale yellow or white, shades that were also fashionable in Europe in the 1830s. When going out, women usually wore their peinetón together with a rebozo, which was worn over the accessory or rested on the shoulders. Evidence of this are the notices of lost peinetones, in which women detailed the colors and designs of the rebozo that accompanied the accessory at the time of its loss.

Eventually, the size of the peinetón became so large that the passage of women on the narrow sidewalks of the city became complicated, so a police ordinance was issued regulating the right of way for those who walked on the right hand side.

The high popularity of the peinetón resulted in an intense literary, graphic, artistic and journalistic production both for and against the accessory. There are numerous iconographic sources that depict the fashion, such as the portraits of elite ladies of Buenos Aires and Montevideo by artists including Charles Pellegrini, Jacobo Fiorini, Jean-Philippe Goulu, Carlos Morel, Fernando García del Molino, Amadeo Gras, Gaetano Gallino and Adolphe Hastrel de Rivedoux. Among them, Pellegrini's extensive pictorial production stands out, and he has been described as the "graphic historian of peinetones". The trajectory of the peinetón fashion can be followed through his portrait paintings.

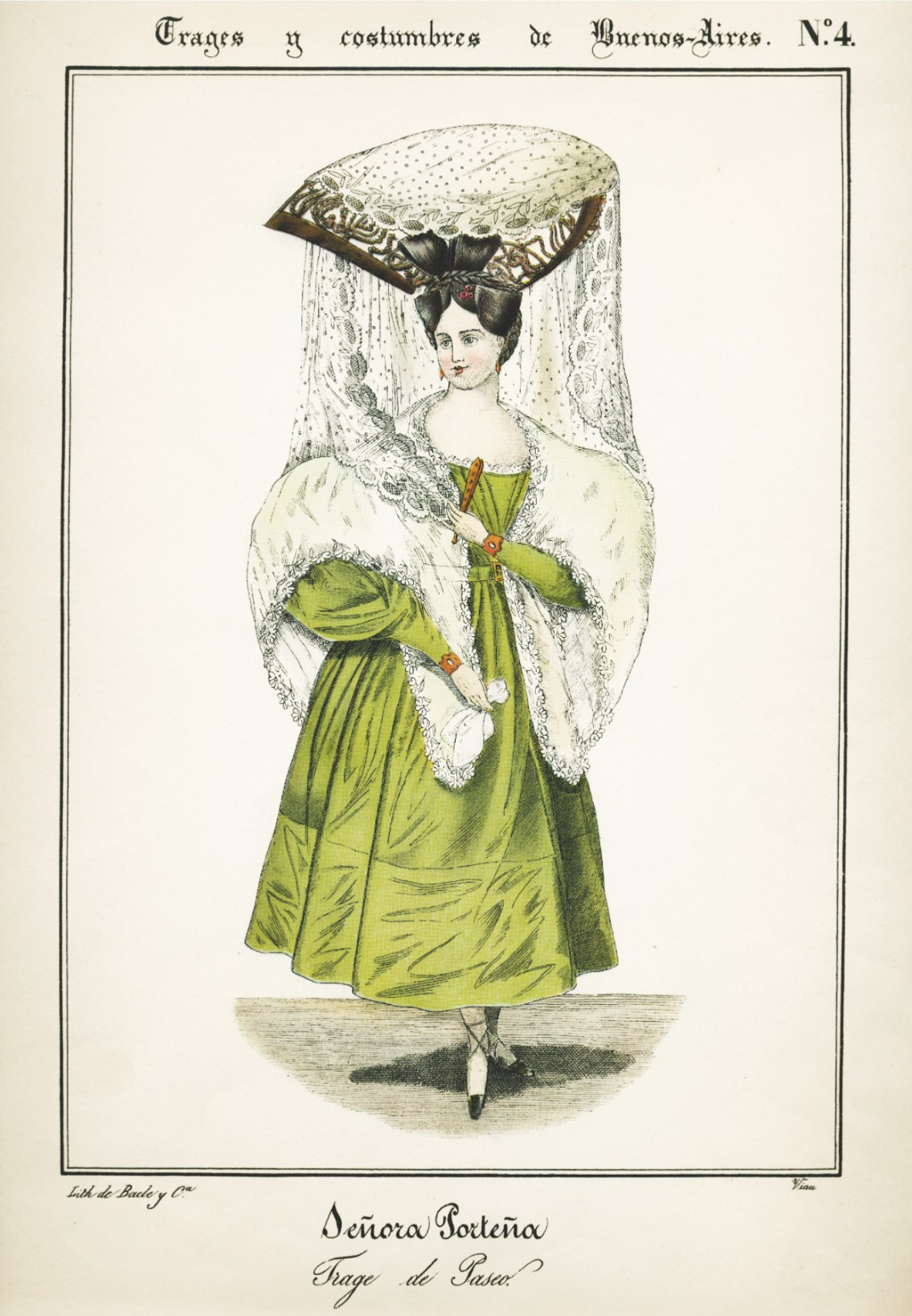
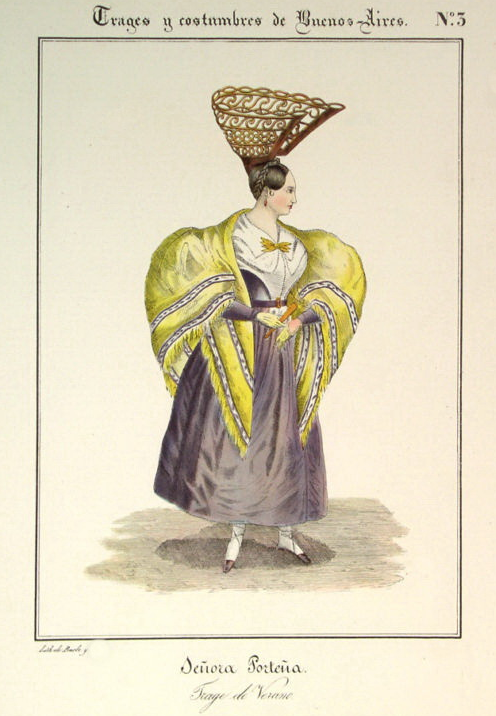
Two fashion lithographs from c. 1833–1834 published in César Hipólito Bacle's costumbrist Trages y costumbres de la provincia de Buenos Ayres [sic], showing porteño ladies in "walking dress" (left) and "summer dress" (right). Peinetones were usually worn together with a rebozo, which was worn over the accessory or rested on the shoulders.

One of the fundamental visual representations of the fashion for peinetones was a series of lithographs produced by César Hipólito Bacle for his collection of prints Trages y costumbres de la provincia de Buenos Ayres [sic] (English: "Dress and customs of the province of Buenos Aires"). It was published in the form of an album and consisted of thirty-six lithographs classified in six booklets (cuadernos), each one dedicated to a peculiarity of Buenos Aires' urban life; being framed within the genre of costumbrismo. The peinetón was first depicted in the 1833 highly successful second edition of Trages y costumbres de la provincia de Buenos Ayres, whose second booklet is dedicated to representing the feminine clothing of porteño women.

An 1833 lithograph published by César Hipólito Bacle shows two Buenos Aires ladies in their morning dresses, who appear without peinetones. This indicates that the use of the peinetón was reserved for social and public life.

On October 29, 1831, The British Packet dedicated an article to the peinetón titled "The Comb", in which the editor declared:

How shall we describe the immense comb, which now forms so prominent a part of the head-dress of the fashionable fair of Buenos Ayres, its fretwork with ornaments, and the graceful mode in which it is arranged in the hair—truly we might exclaim with the "noble Poet," 'I can't describe it, though so much it strike, Nor liken it,—I never saw the like.'

From Buenos Aires, the use of the peinetón notably expanded to Montevideo, where it also came to define the local fashion of the period, as well as Asunción, Paraguay.

Some authors claim that the use of the peinetón also reached Santiago, Chile and Asunción, Paraguay.

"[...] see this new group advancing, and in the middle this superb person wearing proudly, but with majesty, a head adorned with roses and a magnificent peinetón! Wouldn't one say Calypso in the midst of her nymphs?

— One of the accounts of French naturalist Arsène Isabelle about his 1834 stay in Buenos Aires, from his 1835 book Voyage à Buénos-Ayres et à Porto-Alègre.

Two of the most valuable testimonies regarding the fashion for the peinetón come from the travelers chronicles of French naturalists Alcide d'Orbigny and Arsène Isabelle. D'Orbigny's account of the Buenos Aires peinetones has become an "obligatory reference for almost all subsequent studies on the [accessory]." After praising porteño women's taste in fashion and their seductive use of the hand fan, he expresses amazement at the size of their peinetones:

A particular adornment will always distinguish a porteña from every other woman in the world; an adornment that she cherishes as much as her own life. This adornment is an immense comb that draws a wide convex fan on her head, more or less rich, more or less ornate, according to the rank and wealth of the wearer, but it follows her everywhere, only the accessories vary.

D'Orbigny's testimony shows how the peinetón's popularity continued to grow in the late 1820s.

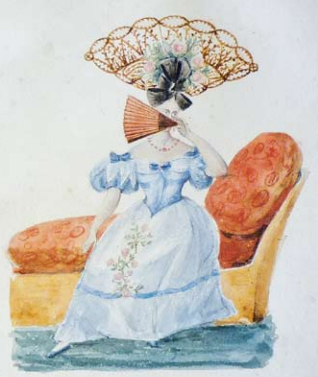
An 1836 watercolor painting by Benoît Darondeau depicting a woman from Montevideo in ball dress.

A section from Charles Darwin's The Voyage of the Beagle, written on an occasion at a provincial estancia outside of Buenos Aires, suggests that provincial men were proud of the elegance of porteño women and their peinetones:

[...] he had one question to ask me [...] I trembled to think how deeply scientific it would be: it was, "Whether the ladies of Buenos Ayres were not the handsomest in the world." I replied, like a renegade, "Charmingly so." He added, "I have one other question: Do ladies in any other part of the world wear such large combs?" I solemnly assured him that they did not. They were absolutely delighted. The captain exclaimed, "Look there! a man who has seen half the world say s it is the case; we always thought so, but now we know it." My excellent judgment in combs and beauty procured me a most hospitable reception [...].

Isabelle wrote in 1834:

Nothing is as imposing as the attitude of a porteña in public! Nothing lends itself more to this air [...] than the way in which they adorn their heads, in which they carry it, accompanying each of its movements with a gesture of arms so soft, so natural, with a turn of hand so light, so often repeated, but so imperceptible that one hardly understands the rapid play of the fan, opening and closing unceasingly! They have a whole edifice of hair on their heads, and it must be so to accompany cut or full combs (peinetones) whose size reached, in 1834, up to one meter and one decimeter of width! (cinco cuartas).

In Montevideo, poet Francisco Acuña de Figueroa—under the pseudonym Cid Frageiro Fonseca—criticized the trend in a column of newspaper El Investigador of January 23, 1833, titled "Down with peinetas!!".

== Sociological implications ==
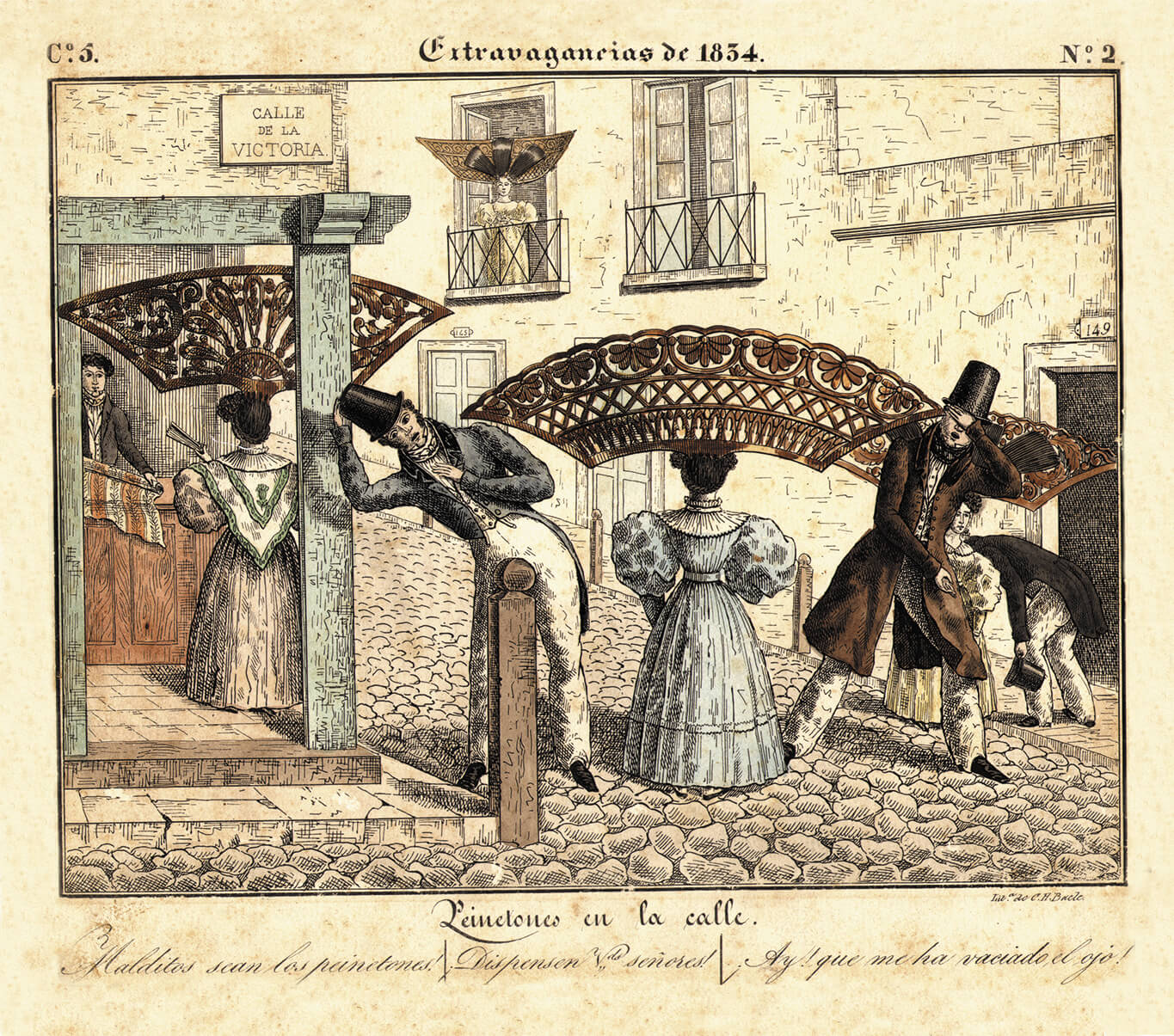
"Peinetones at the Street" (1834). Lithograph number two from the fifth booklet of Bacle's Trajes y costumbres de la provincia de Buenos Aires. The text reads: "Damn the peinetones! / Disperse yourselves gentlemen! / Oh! She has emptied my eye!". This caricature critiques the presence of women in public space, hindering the lives of men due to their large peinetones.

Several authors interpret the fashion of extravagant peinetones as a way for women to burst in and reaffirm themselves in public space, at a time when they were heavily relegated to domestic life. According to Root:

Authors and artists alike used the ambiguity of the peinetón, which equated a woman's comb with public participation, to reflect on the breakdown of rigid gender roles and the transformation of public spaces. Shattering expectations, the emblematic peinetón called into question the exclusivity of male participation in the public sphere by allowing women to improvise their citizenship individually and collaboratively. Engaging fashion as presence, women took their vision of independence to the streets of Buenos Aires. They were promptly reminded, however, that their fashionable crowns granted reign over domestic obligations and not over the streets of Buenos Aires.

Hallstead wrote:

[...] the peinetón represented a sort of anomaly: it was overtly public but limiting, it permitted female consumption which only ultimately served to boast male potency, it mandated additional space for females in the public arena while simultaneously inhibiting functional participation because of its size, and it called attention to the female body in the public sphere while it also served to spark debate on the "true" purpose of the female (domesticity, motherhood, modesty, etc.) as opposed "public" women.

Writing for The Fashion Studies Journal, Inés Corujo-Martín noted:

... within the nation-building process, women of postcolonial Argentina wore the peinetón fashionably to assert their presence in the public and political spheres, gaining unprecedented social visibility. The high price of the peinetón became progressively linked to female prostitution, which helps to explain the quick demise of the peinetón from the streets of Buenos Aires and its final disappearance in 1837. The rise and decline of this accessory is intimately linked to the reconfiguration of gender roles through fashion in the postcolonial context, a unique historical moment when certain items of adornment became invested with an influential ideological message. The peinetón thus marks a fascinating relationship between fashion, politics, and gender––a theme that needs further exploration.

The peinetón is one of the first manifestations of authentically Argentine fashion.

== Conservation ==
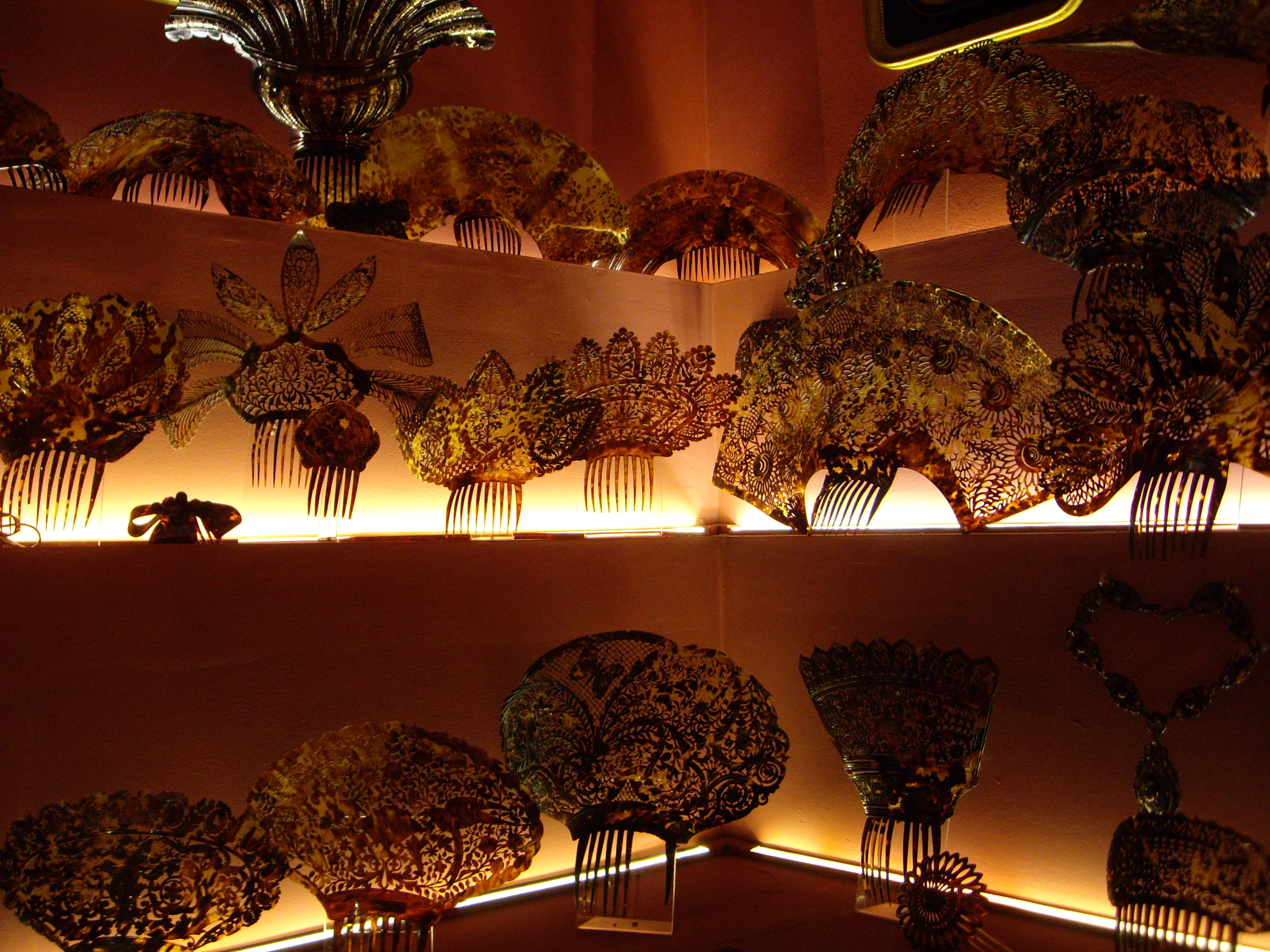
A variety of peinetones in exhibition at the Fernández Blanco Museum in Buenos Aires, 2012.

As one of the first manifestations of local fashion, many peinetones are now part of Argentine museum collections, such as the National Museum of Fine Arts, the Costume History Museum, the Fernández Blanco Museum, the Cornelio de Saavedra Museum and the National Historical Museum in Buenos Aires, and the Enrique Udaondo Museum Complex in Luján, Buenos Aires Province.

In Uruguay, the Historic Museum at the Montevideo Cabildo has in its collection a series of replicas of original peinetones made by Manuel Hugo Paz Morquio in 1953.

== See also ==
- 1820s in Western fashion
- 1830s in Western fashion
- List of headgear
