= Peineta =

Peineta may refer to:

- Peineta (album), a studio album by the rock band Los Tres
- Peineta (comb), a large decorative comb to keep a mantilla in place
