= Étienne Hastrel de Rivedoux =

French general (1766–1846)

Étienne d'Hastrel de Rivedoux
- Born: 4 February 1766; Pointe-aux-Trembles, Province of Québec
- Died: 19 September 1846 (aged 80) Versailles, France
- Allegiance: France
- Branch: General Staff
- Service years: 1781–1825; 1830–1832
- Rank: General of Division
- Conflicts: French Revolutionary Wars; Napoleonic Wars
- Awards: Knight of the Legion d'Honneur 14 June 1804; Baron of the Empire 27 July 1808; Knight of the Order of Saint Hubert; Knight of Saint Ferdinand of Spain; Grand Cross of Fidelity of Baden; Order of Saint Louis; Commander of the Legion of Honor, 1832

Étienne d'Hastrel de Rivedoux (4 February 1766 – 19 September 1846) was a general of the First French Empire who fought in the French Revolutionary Wars and the Napoleonic Wars. He was born 4 February 1766 at Pointe-aux-Trembles in Quebec, which was then the British colony, Province of Québec, the son of an officer in the French military. His father had served in India during the Seven Years' War, and later in Quebec.

The son of rural nobility, he attended the Royal Military School in Paris as a gentleman-cadet. After his graduation, Hastrel occupied several junior positions. During the French Revolution in 1789, and its subsequent political and social upheavals, he affirmed his loyalty to France. Described by his colleagues as naturally talented, quickly moved into the ranks of the general staff, filling increasingly important positions in several French field armies, including the Army of the Rhine, the Army of the Danube, the Army of Helvetia, and the Grande Armée. He also managed an autonomous division of engineers and sappers during the Peninsular War.

After the Bourbon Restoration, he retained his titles and honors. He was recalled from retirement in 1830, during the July Revolution. He died 19 September 1846 at Versailles.

== Family ==
Étienne d'Hastrel descended from a family of rural notables. He was the son of Christophe Claude d'Hastrel of Rivedoux, a second son of the Lord of Rivedoux, Pierre Bruno d'Hastrel. (Note: His paternal great grandparents, Jean-Baptiste Hastrel St-Léger-en-Bray from Picardy and Maria Bruno or Bruneau were married in La Flotte-en-Ré, 24 July 1684. Pierre Bruno d'Hastrel; Siegneur de Rivedoux Christophe Claude d'Hastrel; Captain, Grenadiers; 1724–1782 Marie Arnaud-Bruneau de Granay ^{(1)} Married July 1684 La Flotte-en-Ré Etienne d'Hastrel de Rivedoux Marie Anne Lienard de Boisjoly Unless otherwise noted, see Fournier, Marcel. ^(1) Commission des arts et monuments. Recueil, [s.l] (periodic literature), vol 1-2, pp. 436–438.) His mother, Marie Anne Lienard de Boisjoly married his father, Christophe Claude d'Hastrel, a gentleman from the Île de Ré, a small island off the coast of France near La Rochelle, on 12 February 1760 in Neuville. The senior d'Hastrel was a captain in the Languedoc Regiment, in a company of grenadiers. He participated in the siege of Pondicherry in the Seven Years' War. (Note: Christophe d'Hastrel returned to France around 1766. He died in Pondicherry (India) on 1 July 1782. (in French) Marcel Fournier.) Etienne d'Hastrel's elder brother, Jacques Bruno D'Hastrel, ecuyer (equerry), Chevalier, and Lord of Rivedoux, was a Knight of the Order of Saint Louis. Upon their father's death in 1782, he inherited the family estates and titles.

Etienne Hastrel was married twice, first in 1796 to his cousin Marie-Josephe d'Hastrel Rivedoux (b. 1767), who died 18 January 1801. He married later to an Alsatian, Louise Zäpffel or Zöpffel, the sister of Henri Jacques Guillaume Clarke. He and his second wife had a son, Adolphe Hastrel de Rivedoux (1805–1875), artillery captain and traveler, but best known as a painter and print maker.

== Military career ==
Étienne d'Hastrel was admitted to the Royal Military School in Paris as a gentleman-cadet, with the rank of sous-lieutenant on 11 September 1781. When he graduated on 8 May 1784, he joined the Artois Regiment—later the 48th Infantry Regiment—as a lieutenant. He was present at Rennes during the turmoil immediately following the Revolution, particularly divisive in the military. Some of soldiers, and indeed of some of the officers, suspected the loyalty of fellow officers remained with the old regime. Hastrel worried that the officers could no longer command the obedience of the troops, and recounted in his journal:

"The reception of the tri-color occasioned a scene of insubordination, which deprived us of several officers and served as a pretext to the revolutionaries to inspire defiance among the soldiers. At the moment when the flag was blessed and given to the battalion, the commander gave the orders to leave the church, but the soldiers would not budge. Stirred up by the youths who had assisted with the ceremony, they declared that they would not leave the old flag to be hung from the church vaults.... We could not enforce our commands....Seeing his authority ignored, the commander left the church and was followed by six or seven other officers. Then Capitaine Sermizelles, who had stayed, took the flag and gave it to the priest to be hung in the church.... [T]he battalion...returned to the barracks in order."

He was promoted to captain with the campaign of the Vosges on 13 April 1792. He participated in the engagements at Frankfurt am Main and Hochheim and siege of Mainz (1793), and a small engagement at Bingen. Subsequently he was named adjutant staff major of the Army of the Rhine on 11 July 1793.

Promotions
- Adjutant and Chef of Brigade 5 February 1799
- General of Brigade 26 January 1807
- General of Division 25 March 1811

Honors

- Knight of the Légion d'honneur 14 June 1804
- Baron of the Empire 27 July 1808
- Knight of the Order of Saint Hubert
- Knight of Saint Ferdinand of Spain
- Commander of the Legion of Honor, 1810
- Grand Cross of Fidelity of Baden, ~1811
- Order of Saint Louis, 1814

In 1799, he was appointed to Jean-Baptiste Jourdan's general staff of the Army of the Danube, garrisoned initially in Strasbourg. After crossing the Rhine in early March, the Army engaged Archduke Charles' Austrian troops at the battles of Ostrach and Stockach. Following defeat at Ostrach, the army was reorganized with the Army of Helvetia, under command of André Masséna. Hastrel received a staff appointment in Milan.

François Antoine Louis Bourcier served with Hastrel in the Army of the Danube. In 1800, he described Hastrel to François Nicolas Fririon:

"The talents he has received from nature have been expanded by a careful education. His activities and services as the deputy of the general staff should make him eligible for promotion to a superior rank."

In 1804, Etienne Hastrel became a member of the Legion of Honor. For the campaigns of 1805 against Austria, of 1806 against Prussia, and of 1807 against Poland, he served on the staffs of Antoine-François Andréossy. While in Warsaw in 1807, he was promoted to general of brigade. Upon his return to Germany, Hastrel was appointed to the staff of the Prince of Ponte-Corvo, Jean-Baptiste Bernadotte, on 20 August 1809 and, later, to the staff of Nicolas Oudinot in Holland. Etienne Hastrel also served as the military governor of Neumarkt, in Küstrin, Pomerania, 15 February 1807 to May 1807, and in the military government of Hamburg. In 1809, Napoleon sent Etienne Hastrel to Spain, to command the engineer park attached to French army. This included three companies of miners, nine companies of sappers, a battalion of mariners, another of sailors, four companies of pontonniers (bridge builders), four companies of pioneers (engineers), two companies of artillery, and park's own medical detachment, close to 5,000 men. In June 1810, he was rewarded as Commander of the Legion of Honor.

As chief of general staff of the Provisional Army of Germany, and later major general (after 1811) he was appointed 13 March 1812 as director-general of military conscription, a position which he held until the peace of 1814.

== Bourbon restoration ==
Louis XVIII named him a Knight of Order of Saint Louis upon the restoration and placed him command of the military of the Vosges in October. During the Hundred Days, Napoleon appointed him as director of the Ministry of War.

In 1816, the King appointed him to various inspector generalships from 1816 to 1823, and he retired in 1825. During the July Revolution of 1830, he was recalled to the general staff, but he retired permanently in 1832. He became a grand officer of the Legion of Honor on 8 May 1835. During his retirement, he wrote his memoires, which were published in 1833.

He died 19 September 1846 at his home in Versailles and is buried at Cemetery of Notre Dame, at Versailles. Sixty-one of his letters, written between 1806 and 1841, are preserved at the Public Library of France, under the title Belgique, Les fètes de Bruges.

== Sources ==
=== Bibliography ===
- Broughton, Tony. "Generals Who Served in the French Army during the Period 1789–1815." Research Subjects: French Generals. Napoleon Series. Robert Burnham, Editor in chief. September 2006. Accessed 18 May 2010.
- Cahoon, Ben. "French Military Governors of Pomerania." Provinces of Prussia. 2001. Accessed 18 May 2010.
- (in French) Commission des arts et monuments historiques. Recueil des travaux chimiques des Pays-bas. Paris, 1900, no page.
- Crowdy, Terry. French revolutionary infantryman 1791–1802. Oxford: Osprey, 2003, ISBN 1-84176-552-X.
- Elting, John. Swords around the throne. New York: Da Capo Press, 1997, ISBN 0-306-80757-2.
- (in French) Fournier, Marcel. Fischier Origine. D'Hastrel/Bruno/Rivedou, Christophe No. 290033. Fédération québécoise des sociétés de généalogie. 199-2010. Accessed 18 May 2010.
- (in French) La Roque, Louis de. Catalogue des gentilshommes en 1789 ... Paris, E. Dentu [etc.] 1866.
- (in French) Lievyns, A. et Jean Maurice Verdot, Pierre Bégat, Fastes de la Légion d'honneur: biographie de tous les décorés accompagnée de l'histoire législative et réglementaire de l'ordre. vol. 5, Bureau de l'administration, 1847, 2e éd.
- Ministère de l'éducation nationale. Catalogue général des manuscrits des bibliothèques publiques de France, vol. 8. Paris: Librairie Plon, 1886-, vol. 8.
- (in French) de Sauvigny, Guilliuame et Alfred Fierro. Bibliographie critique des memoires sur la Restoration. Geneve: 1988,
- (in French) Seynaeve, Jacques. De Militaires de Toutes Époques: H. Hastrel. Accessed 18 May 2010.
