= Mantilla =

Traditional Spanish lace or silk veil worn over the head and shoulders

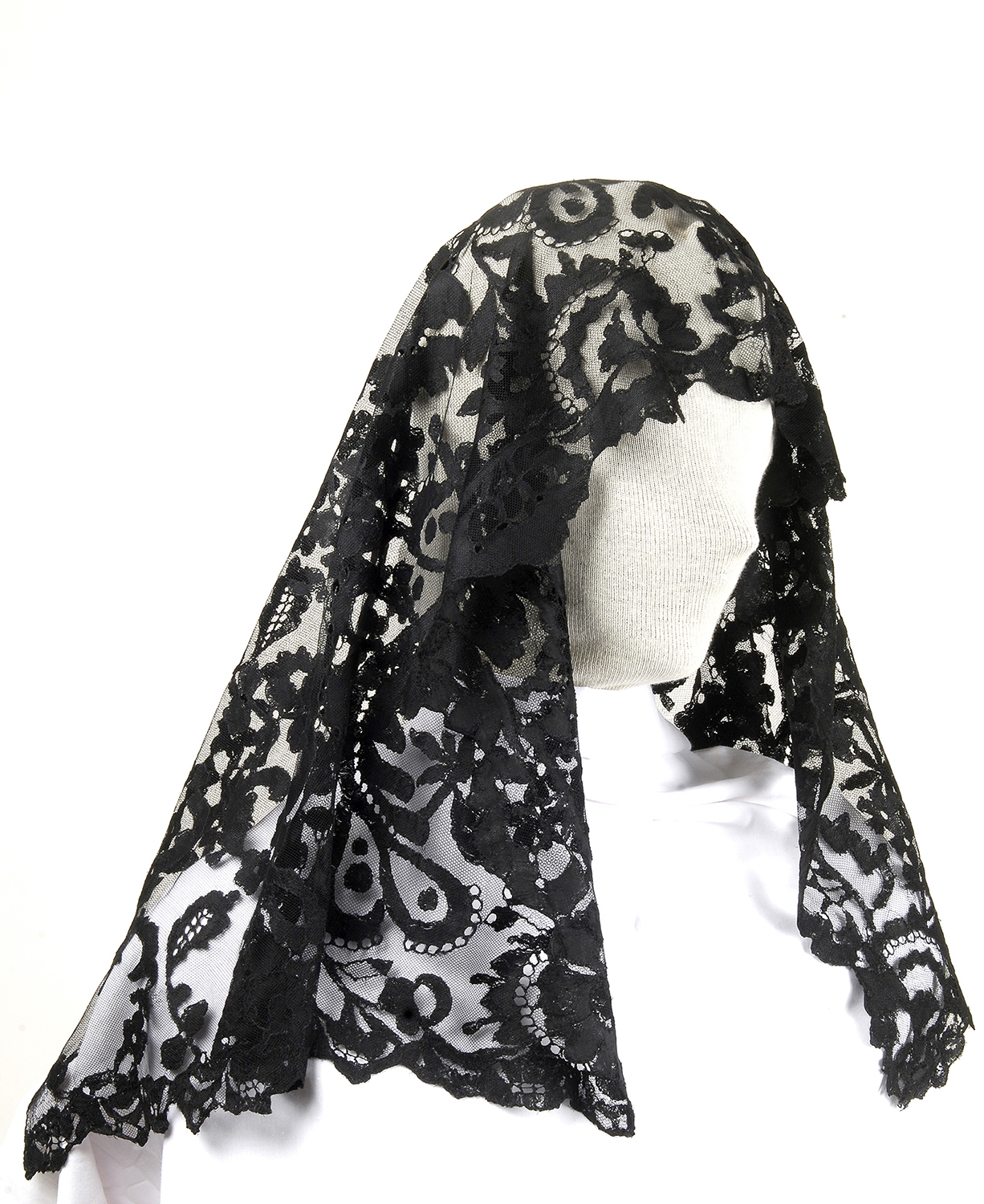
- Blond mantillina. Valencian Museum of Ethnology.
- Type: Headgear
- Material: Silk lace or tulle
- Place of origin: Spain
- Introduced: 16th century

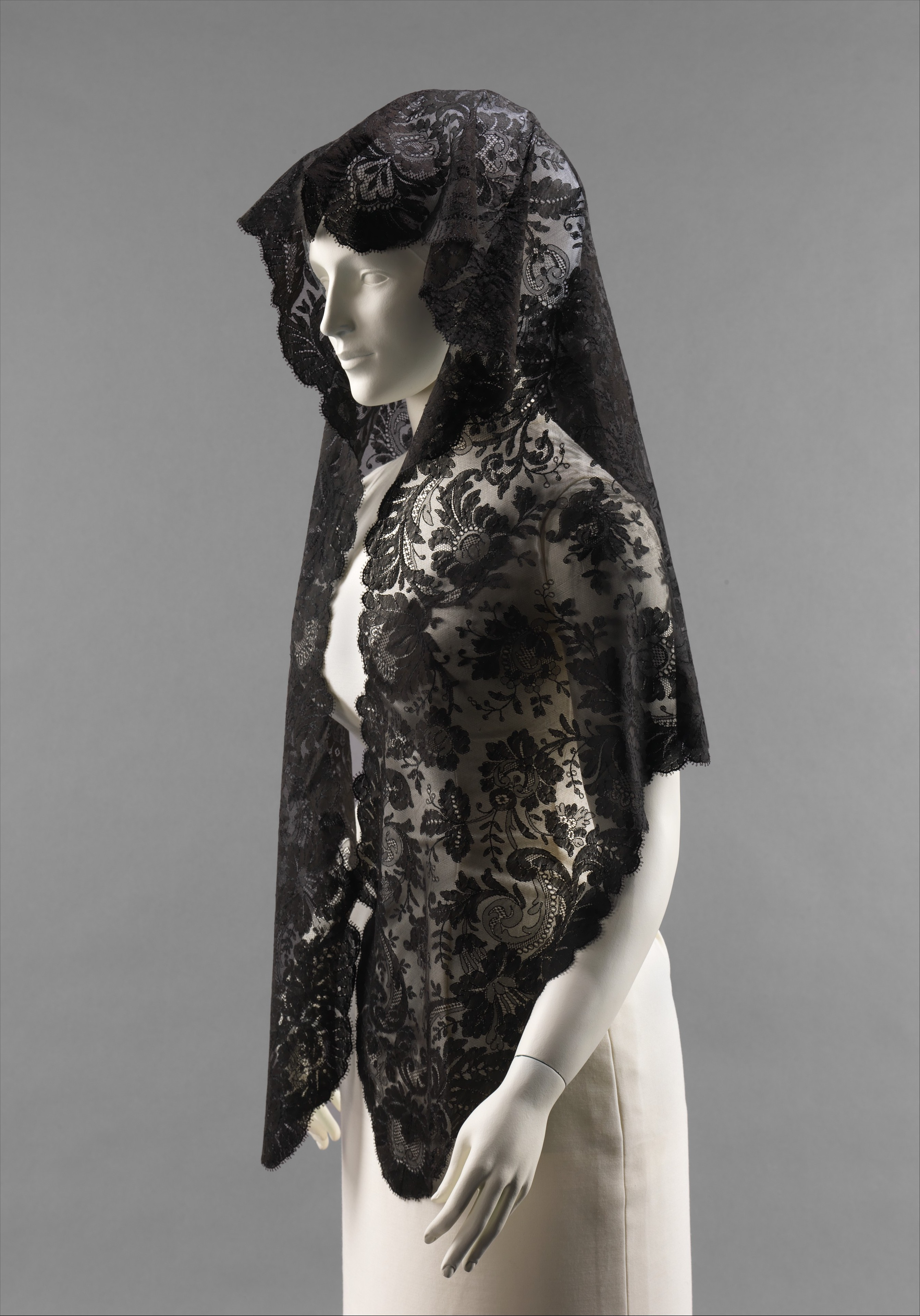
Side angle shot of a blond mantilla

A mantilla is a traditional female liturgical lace or silk veil or shawl worn over the head and shoulders, often over a high hair ornament called a peineta, particularly popular with women in Spain and Latin America. Within Christendom, it is worn by Catholic and Plymouth Brethren women around the world, Mennonite women in Argentina, and without the peineta by Eastern Orthodox women in Russia. When worn by Eastern Orthodox women the mantilla is often white, and is worn with the ends crossed over the neck and draped over the opposite shoulder. The mantilla is worn as a Christian headcovering by women during church services, as well as during special occasions. A smaller version of the mantilla is called a toquilla.

== History ==
The lightweight ornamental mantilla came into use in the warmer regions of Spain towards the end of the 16th century, and ones made of lace became popular with women in the 17th and 18th centuries, being depicted in portraits by Diego Velázquez and Goya. With Spain being largely a Christian country, the mantilla is a Spanish adaption of the Christian practice of women wearing headcoverings during prayer and worship (cf. 1 Corinthians 11:2–10).

As Christian missionaries from Spain entered the Americas, the wearing of the mantilla as a Christian headcovering was brought to the New World. Fray Nicolás García Jerez, who in the 19th century served as the Bishop of Nicaragua and Costa Rica, as well as the Governor of Nicaragua, mandated that mantillas be opaque and not made of transparent lace; women who continued to wear thin mantillas were excommunicated from the Church. (Note: The early Christian Church's Apostolic Tradition specified that Christian headcovering is to be observed with an "opaque cloth, not with a veil of thin linen".)

In the 19th century, Queen Isabella II actively encouraged use of the mantilla, but the practice diminished after her abdication in 1870. By 1900 the use of the mantilla became largely limited to church services, as well as formal occasions such as bullfights, Holy Week and weddings.

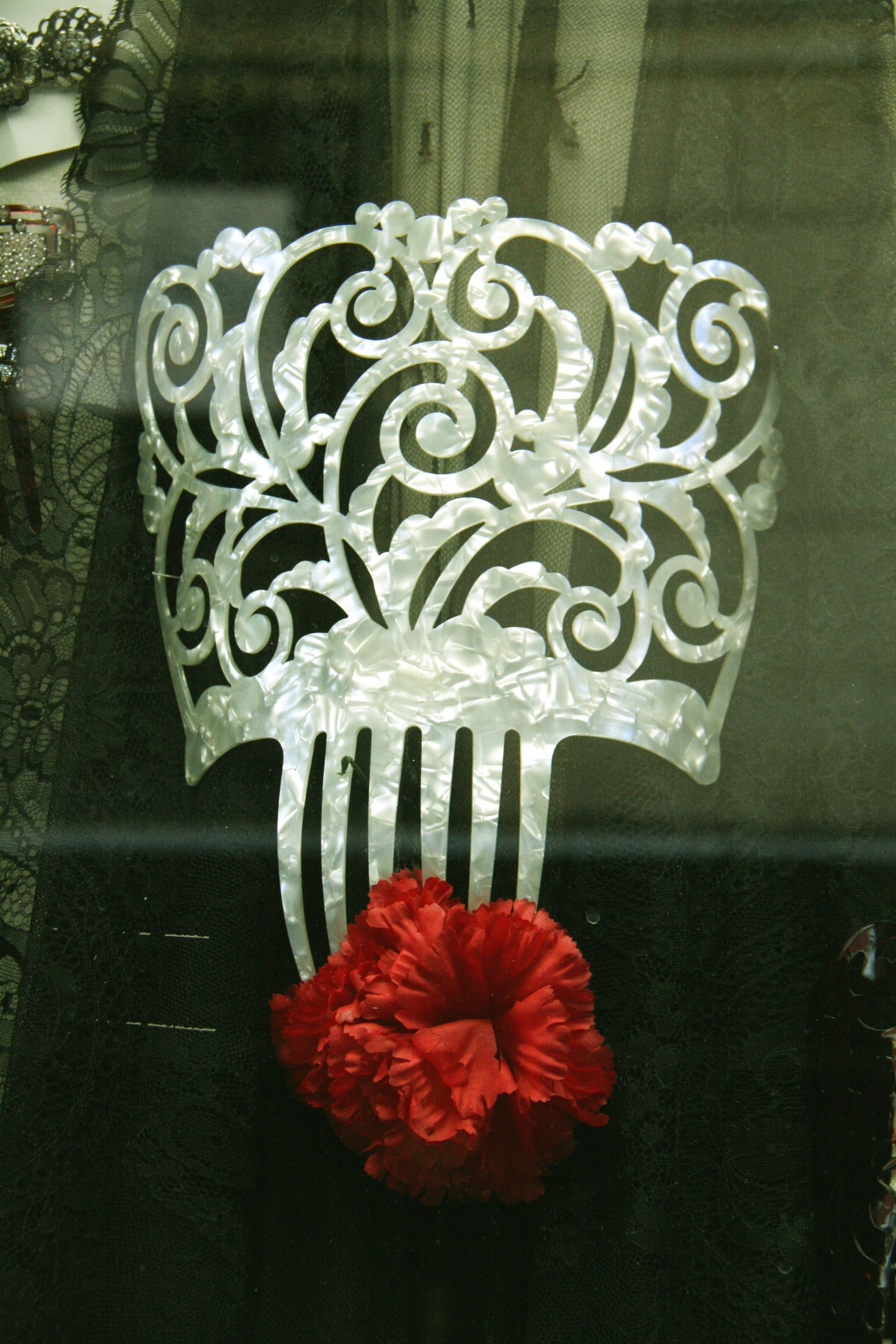
Peineta crafted of mother of pearl

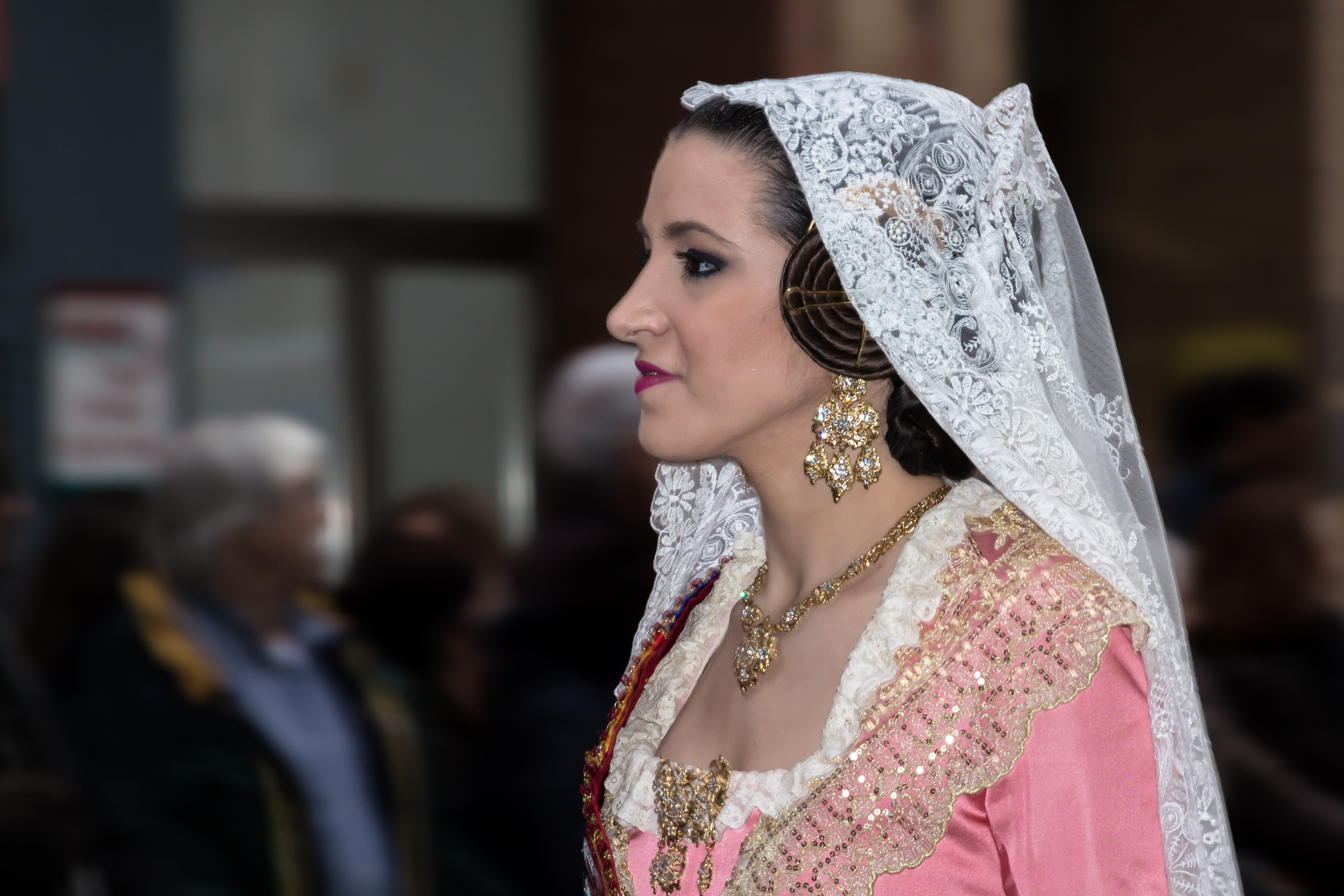
A fallera, woman with mantilla in the fallas of València

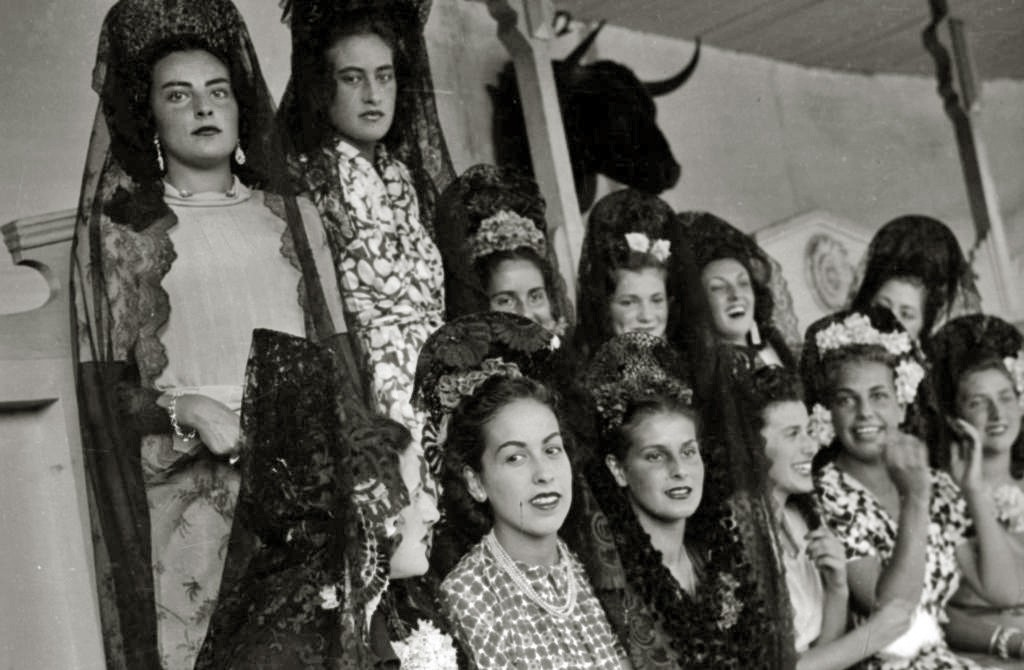
Women wearing mantilla in a corrida in Spain in 1939

In Spain, women still wear mantillas during Holy Week (the week preceding Easter), bullfights and weddings. A black mantilla is also traditionally worn by a woman who is meeting with the Pope and a white mantilla is appropriate for a church wedding, but can be worn at other ceremony occasions as well. The exception to this is known as the privilège du blanc: only the Queen of Spain and a handful of other Catholic wives of Catholic sovereigns may wear a white mantilla during an audience with the Pope.

In Argentina, many women who are Mennonite Christians wear the mantilla as a form Christian headcovering. Traditional Catholic women and Plymouth Brethren women worldwide also use the mantilla for the same purpose.

== Peineta ==
A peineta, similar in appearance to a large comb, is used to hold up a mantilla. This ornamental comb, usually in tortoiseshell color, originated in the 19th century. It consists of a convex body and a set of prongs and is often used in conjunction with the mantilla. It adds the illusion of extra height to the wearer and also holds the hair in place when worn during weddings, processions and dances. It is a consistent element of some regional costumes of Valencia and Andalusia and it is also often found in costumes used in the Moorish and Romani people influenced music and dance called flamenco.

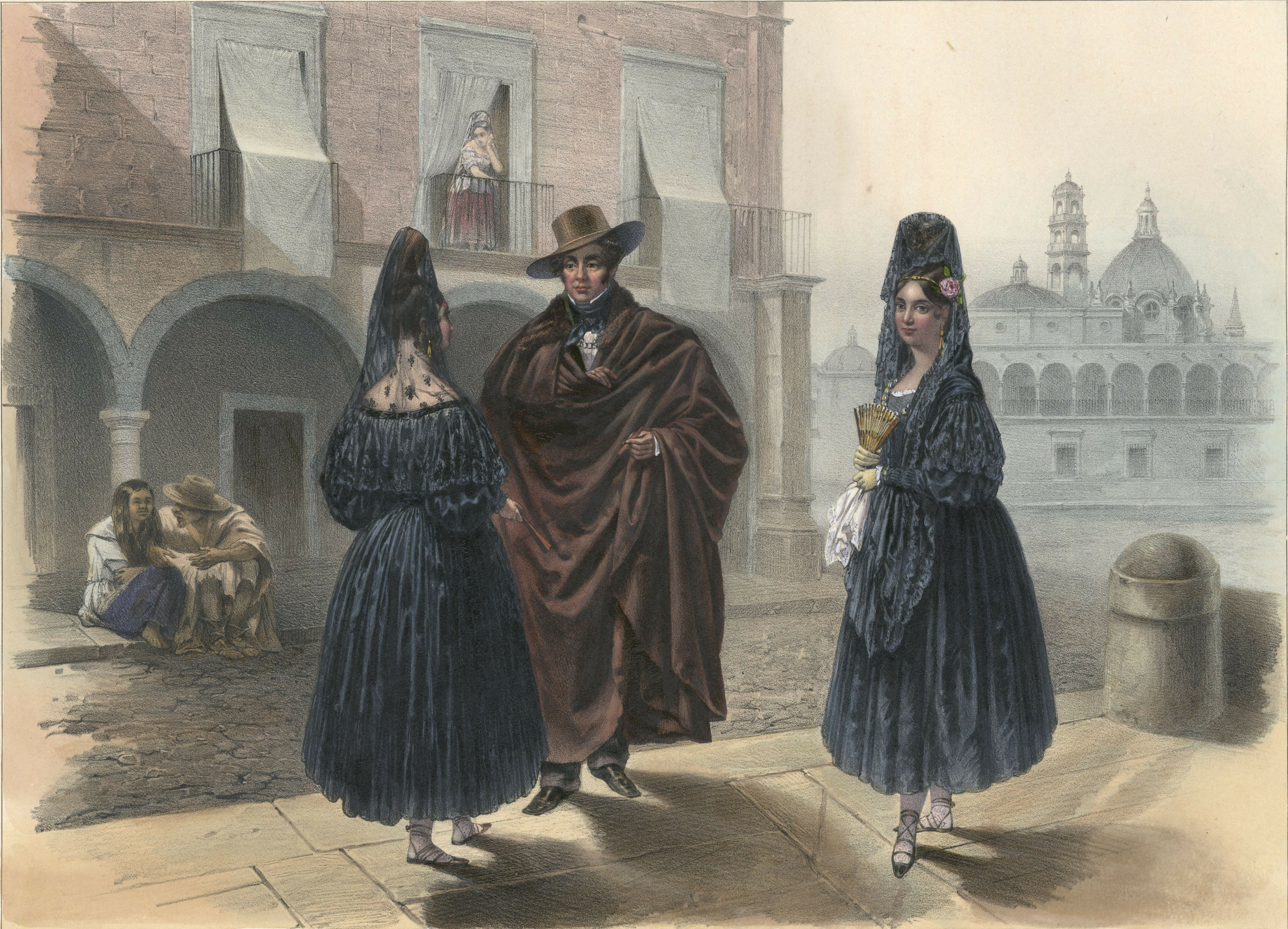
Mexican women wearing the mantilla, painting by Carl Nebel, 1836

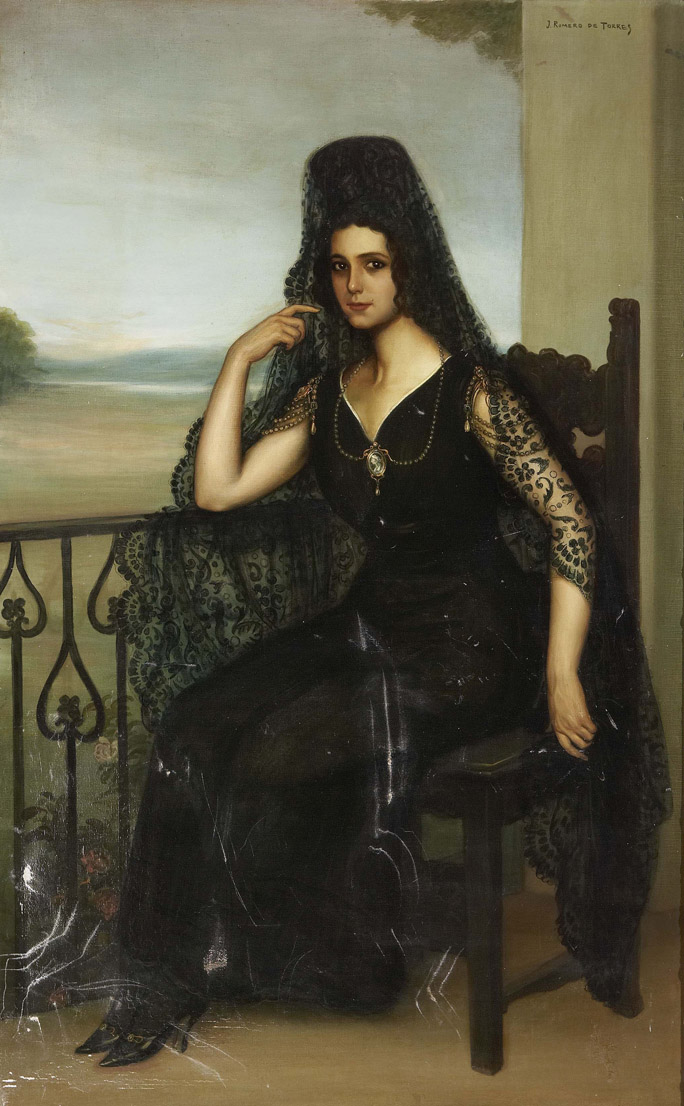
Raquel Meller, Spanish singer and actress, 1910

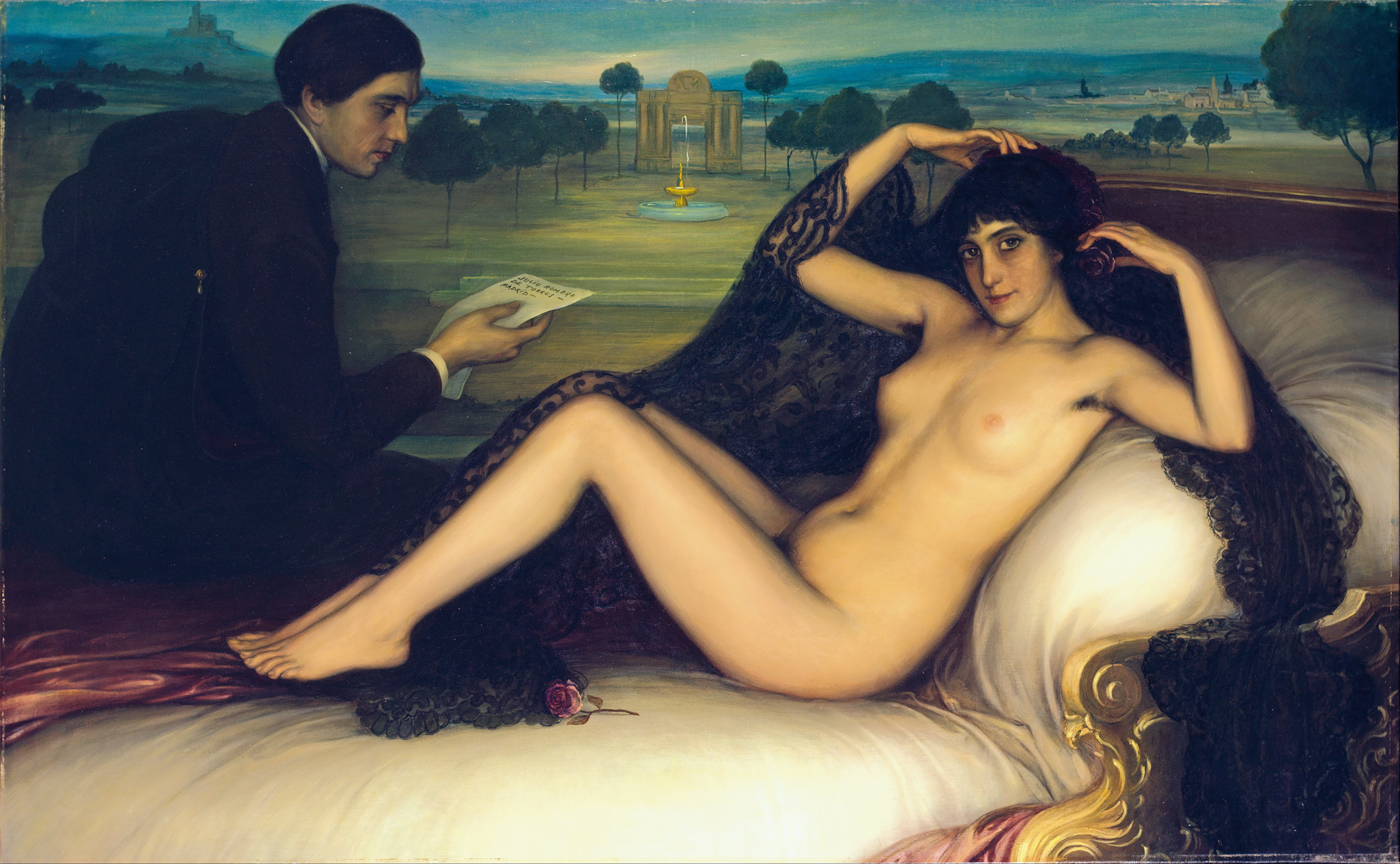
Raquel Meller with her husband, Enrique Gómez Carrillo, in the painting Venus of Poetry, 1913

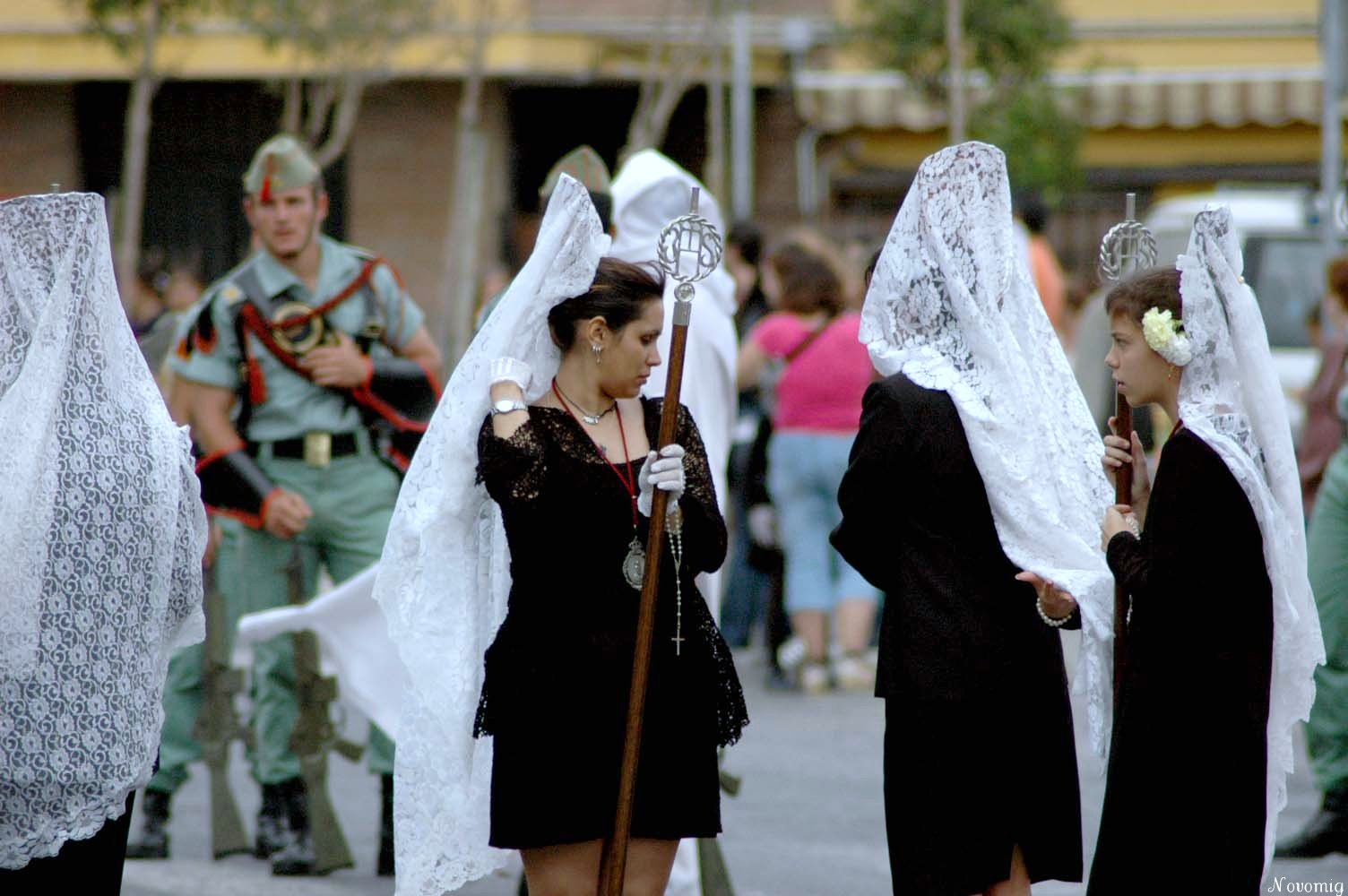
Mantilla made of white lace, during a Holy Week procession in Spain, 2006

== See also ==
- Christian headcovering
- Easter bonnet
- Mob cap
