= Peineta (comb) =

Hair ornament traditionally worn by women in the Hispanic world

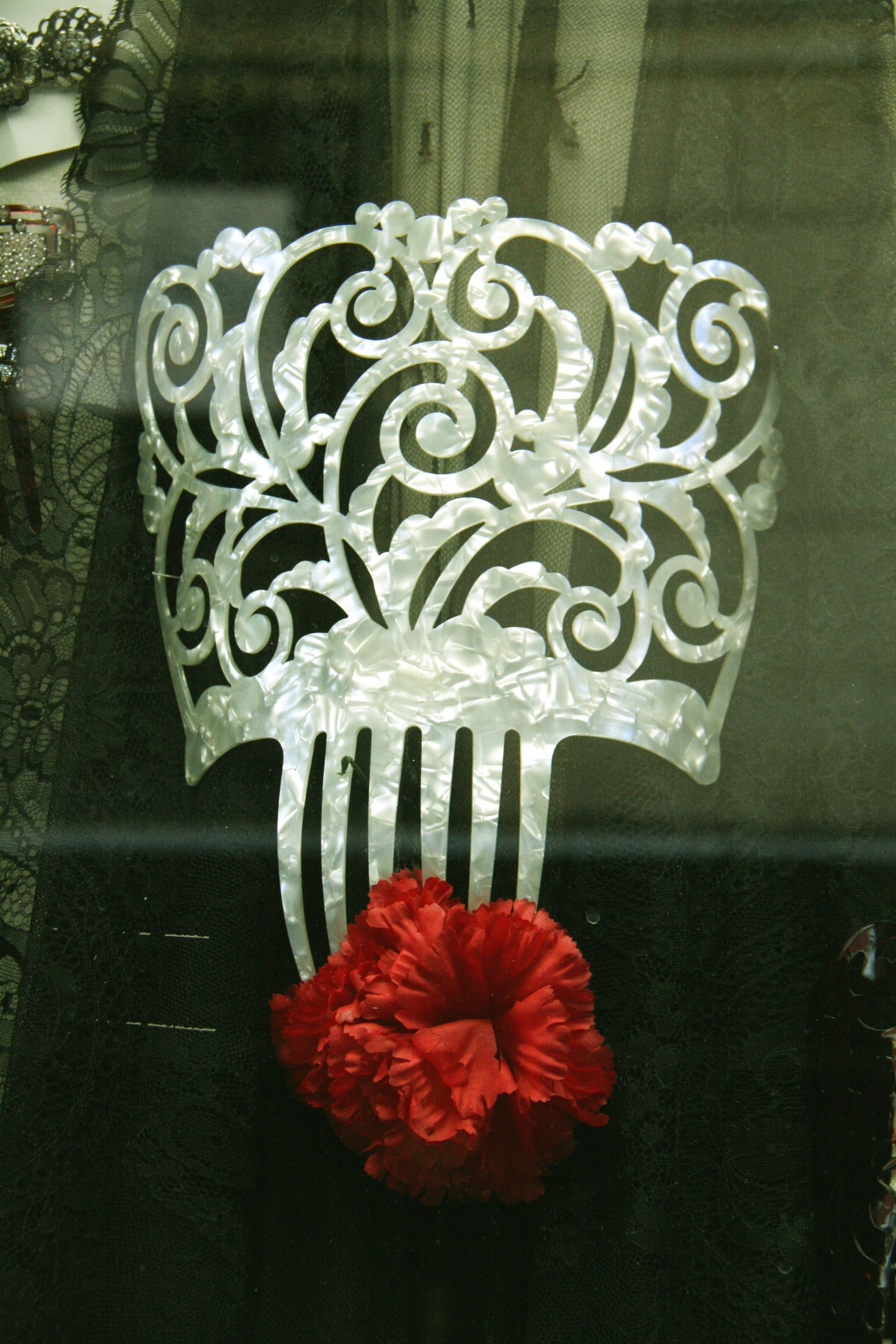
- Peineta crafted of Mother of Pearl
- Type: Hair ornament
- Material: Tortoiseshell, nacre, plastic
- Place of origin: Spain
- Introduced: 19th century

A peineta is a large female head ornament held to the hair by a row of teeth and usually worn under a mantilla, or lace covering the head. It is traditional in Spain and the rest of the Hispanic world.

The hair ornament, worn by women, consists of a convex body and a set of teeth that affix it to hair worn in a bun. The peineta was once made of tortoise shell, but is now usually made of synthetic materials such as acrylic or plastic.

The origin of the peineta goes back to the 19th century in Spain, but there is evidence of its use on the Iberian Peninsula as early as the 5th century BCE and in other areas from the 17th century. It is used today primarily during special occasions such as weddings, bullfights, Holy Week processions, and traditional performances of flamenco music.

Between the mid-1820s and the mid-1830s, the fashion for a new type of headpiece known as peinetón—derived from the Spanish peineta—became widespread among elite women in the Río de la Plata cities of Buenos Aires and Montevideo, and had a great impact on the society of the time. Peinetones were characterized by their overly large size, measuring up to 120 centimetres (3 feet 11 inches) in height and width at the height of their popularity.

The peineta is usually worn with a mantilla, a veil worn over the head and shoulders. The mantilla is also a common element of some Valencian and Andalusian costumes.

In some countries, such as Chile, it is known as peinetas a los peines, while in the Philippines it is referred to as payneta, often much smaller than its Iberian ancestor and may be bejewelled or made of gold.

== Etymology ==
The word comes from the Spanish peinar (via Latin pectinare) meaning "to comb".
