= Adolphe Hastrel de Rivedoux =

French painter

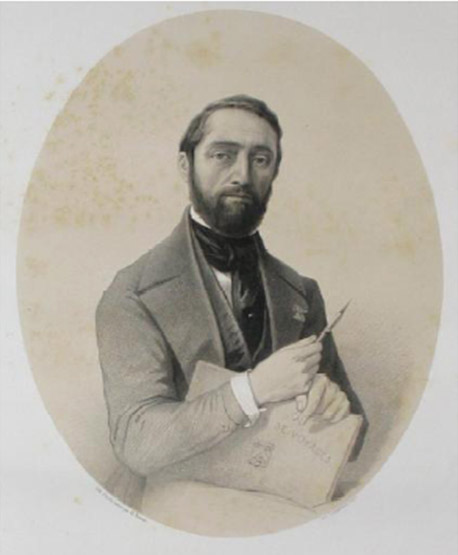
- Adolphe Hastrel de Rivedoux by Charles Henri Hancke (1808–1869)
- Born: 4 October 1804; Neuwiller-lès-Saverne, Bas-Rhin
- Died: 1 July 1875 (aged 70); Nantes, Loire-Atlantique
- Known for: Painting

Adolphe Hastrel de Rivedoux (1804–1875), better known as Adolphe d'Hastrel, was a 19th-century engraver and painter, watercolourist, lithographer and former artillery captain in the navy. Well known for his travels and his writing, he is best known as an artist who drew many watercolors, with a predilection for landscapes and the city of St. Paul, on Ile Bourbon from September 1836 to October 1837. In 1847, ten years after his passage for Réunion, he published an album of 36 views under the title Album de l’île Bourbon with Charles Lemercier.

== Biography ==
He was born on 4 October 1805 in Neuwiller-lès-Saverne, Bas-Rhin, as the younger son of Lieutenant-General Baron Etienne Hastrel de Rivedoux was a general of division in the French Revolutionary Wars and the Napoleonic Wars. His grandfather, Christophe Claude d'Hastrel de Rivedoux, capitain-major of infantry and chevalier de Saint-Louis, survived the Siege of Pondicherry in 1760, during the Seven Years' War.

He traveled the world for twenty years and took advantage of its military missions to draw and paint landscapes, scenes of daily life, human types and costumes. His views of various cities in France, including Les Sables d'Olonne and La Rochelle, the colony of Senegal, Rio de Janeiro and other cities in South America are reproduced or referenced in many works of history, art history or dictionaries, French or foreign. Adolphe Hastrel was also interested in music and the beginnings of photography including daguerreotypes. Upon his return, he himself published a series of albums lithographiques. He died on 1 July 1875 in Nantes, Loire-Atlantique.

== Selected works ==
- Arbre du Conseil près de Dacar
- Tisserand à Gorée
- Hameau de Hann dans l'anse de Gorée
- Une habitation à Gorée (Maison d'Anna Colas)
- Rio de Janeiro dessiné du sommet du Corcovado (1841)
- Montevideo, lithographie, vers 1845
- Pont et aqueduc de Mr Marchand, Ravine à Marquet (1847)
- Igreja de Nossa Senhoras da Glória e Santa Luzia lithography (1847)
- La Rochelle - Place de l’Hôtel de Ville, ud.
- Tour et église de Saint-Sauveur (La Rochelle) (1854)
- Le domaine impérial de la Motte-Beuvron, en Sologne (1858)

== Gallery ==
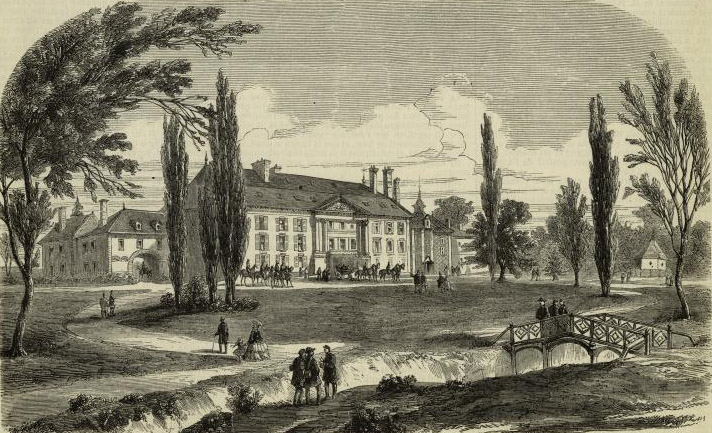
La Motte-Beuvron

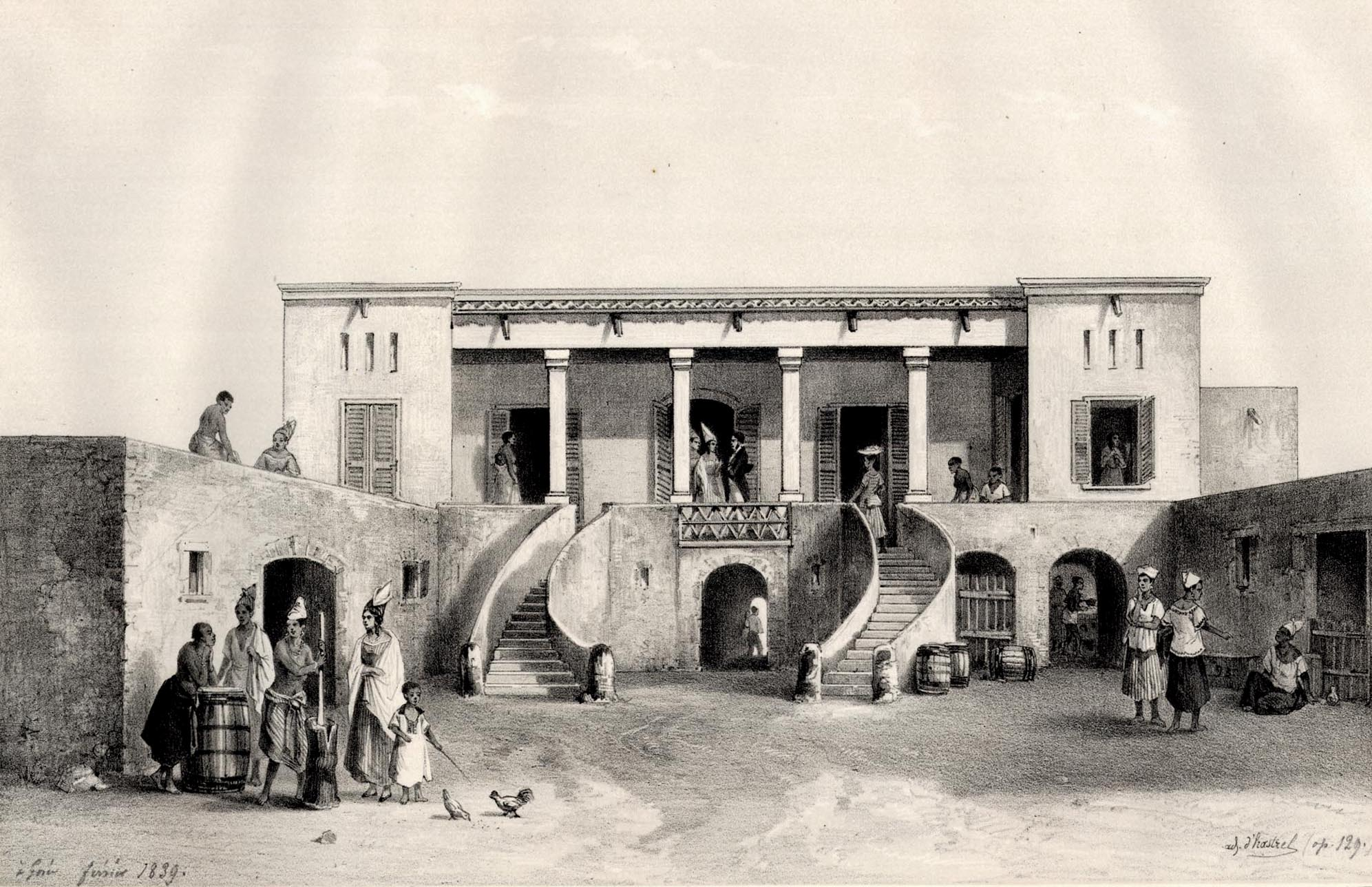
Gorée-Maison Anna Colas

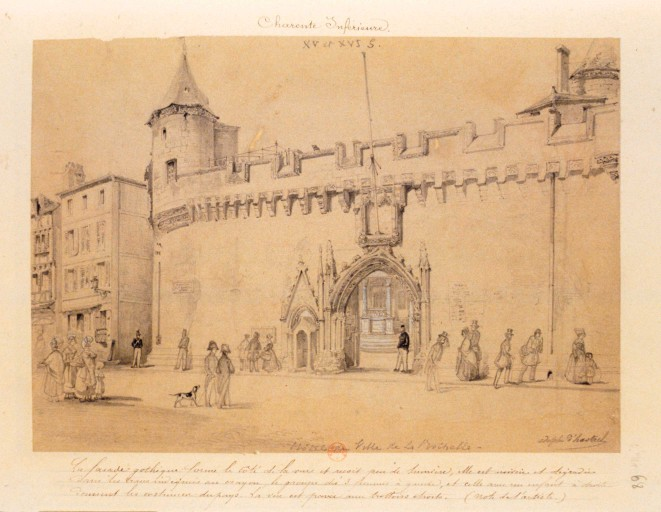
Hôtel de ville de La Rochelle (dessin)

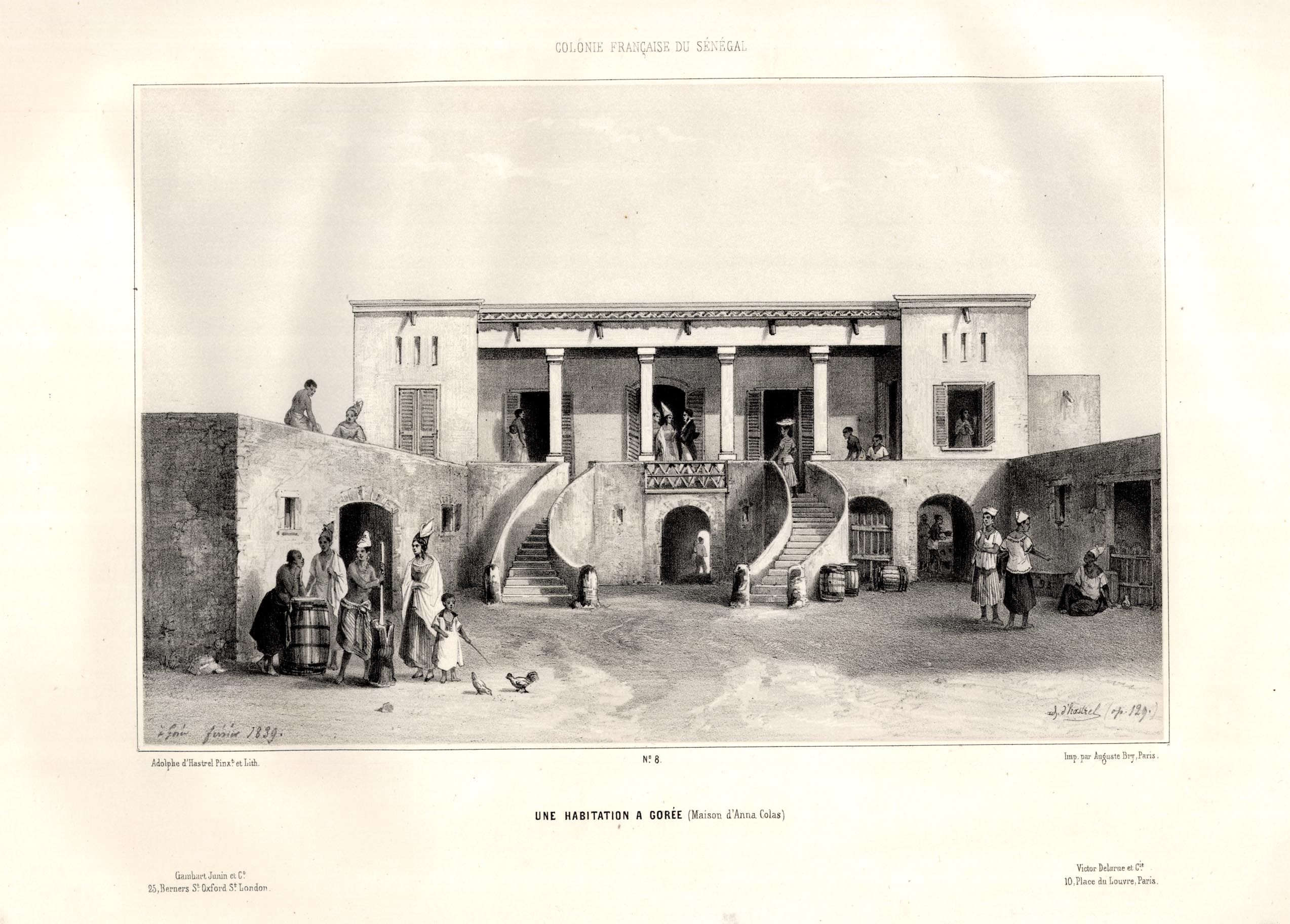
Maison Anna Colas
