= Charles Pellegrini =

French Argentine engineer and artist

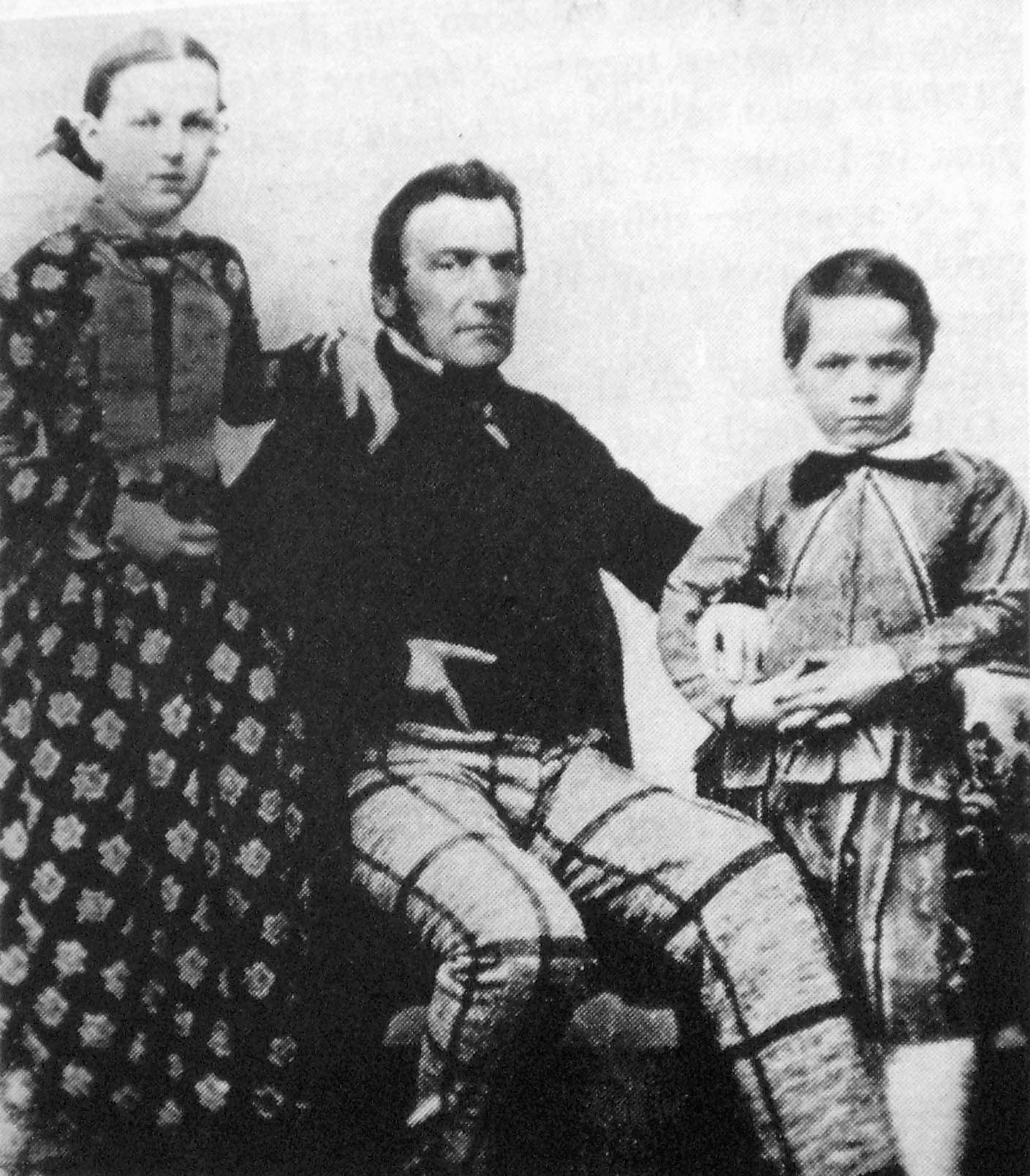
- Charles Pellegrini with his eldest children, Julia and Carlos
- Born: 28 July 1800; Chambéry, Savoy, present-day France
- Died: 12 October 1875 (aged 75); Buenos Aires

Signature
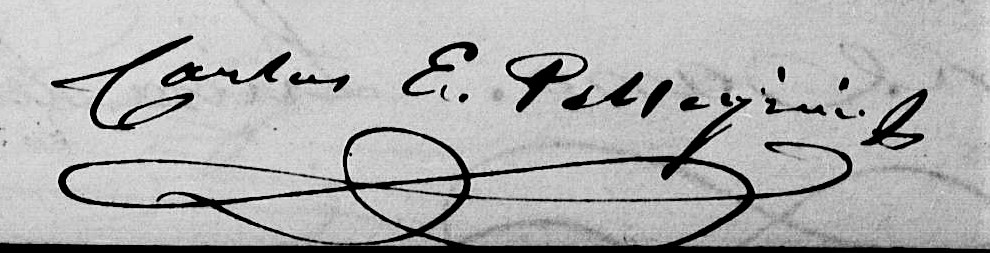

Charles Henri Pellegrini (28 July 1800 – 12 October 1875) was an Italian Argentine engineer, lithographer, painter, and architect. He was father of Argentine president Carlos Pellegrini.

== Life and work ==
Charles Henri Pellegrini was born in Chambéry, Savoy in 1800 when the region was occupied by French revolutionary forces. His mother, Marguerite Berthet, was French, and his father, Bernardo Pellegrini, was a Swiss-Italian from Croglio, Canton Ticino, in the Italian-speaking part of Switzerland. Pellegrini was a talented sketch artist at an early age, and his drawings earned a prize while he was still in primary school. He enrolled at the University of Turin and later at the École Polytechnique, near Paris, where he earned an engineering degree.

Pellegrini was contracted as an engineer by Juan Larrea, a prominent Spanish Argentine merchant with interest in Bordeaux, by request of President Bernardino Rivadavia, and he arrived in Buenos Aires in November 1828. He took a post in the Hydraulic Engineering Department. The bureau, however, was decommissioned in 1829 by order of the Governor of Buenos Aires, General Juan José Viamonte.

He then returned to his early talent, drawing, and sold a number of watercolour paintings, notably cityscape impressions. He was hired by his fellow countryman, journalist and lithographer César Hipólito Bacle, in October 1830 as a portrait painter, and by the end of his commission in September 1831, he had earned around 17,000 pesos (around US$700). He continued to live as a successful lithographer and painter until 1837, when he purchased an estancia, La Figura, in Cañuelas.

He married María Bevans Bright in 1841, and the couple had four children. His wife was the daughter of Anglo Argentine engineer James "Santiago" Bevans, who had been Pellegrini's supervisor at the Hydraulic Engineering Department years earlier. That year, he and Luis Aldana founded the "Lithograph of the Arts," an atelier and printing house. He subsequently installed his own press at his downtown Buenos Aires home, and remained mostly at La Figura.

Following the overthrow of Governor Juan Manuel de Rosas in 1852, Pellegrini returned to Buenos Aires, founded the Revista del Plata (1853), and received numerous contracts as an engineer and architect. The most notable of his works in this latter field was the Colón Theatre. The 2,500 seat opera house, inaugurated in 1857, would be the largest in Argentina until the inaugural of the modern Colón Theatre in 1908.

Pellegrini published a volume of poetry in his later years. He died in Buenos Aires in 1875, at age 75. His eldest son, Carlos Pellegrini, was elected Vice President of Argentina in 1886, and became President in 1890. Many of Pellegrini's watercolours are housed in the National Museum of Fine Arts.

== Works ==
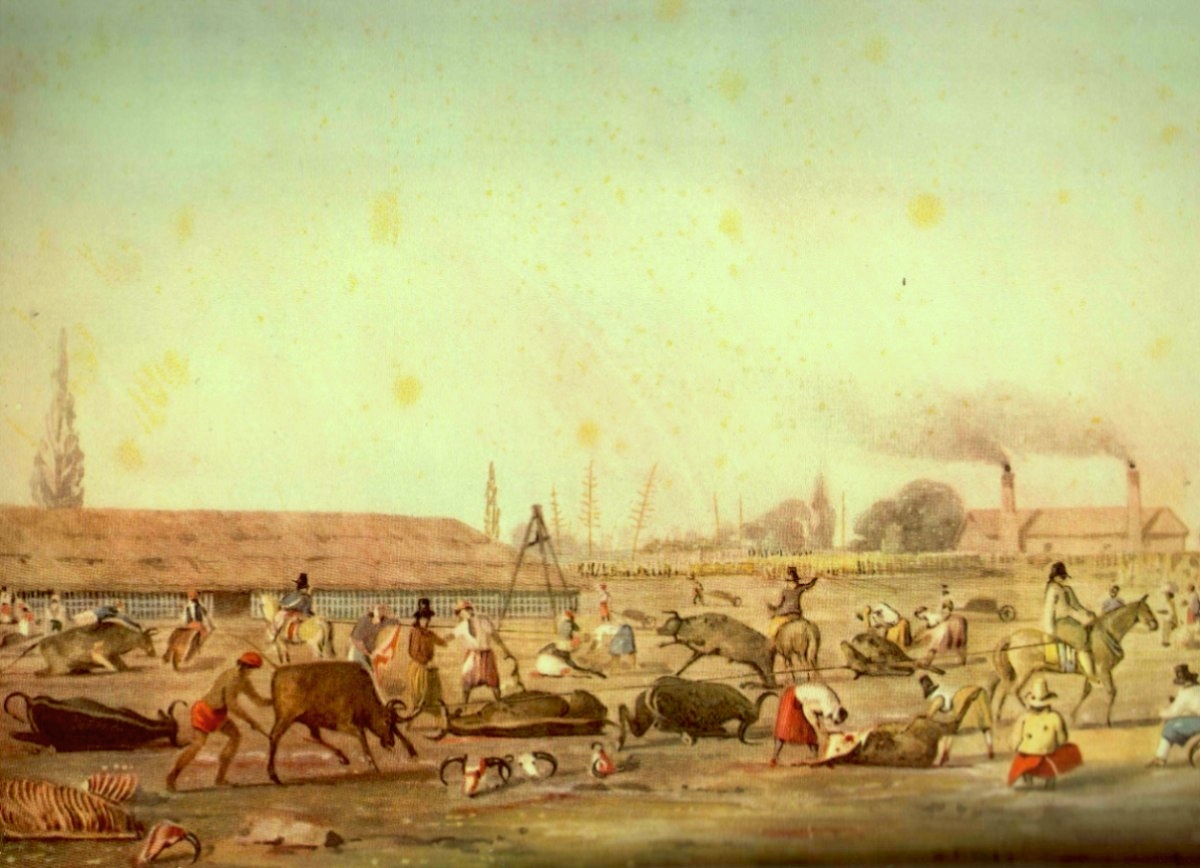
Slaughter yard, watercolour, 1829.

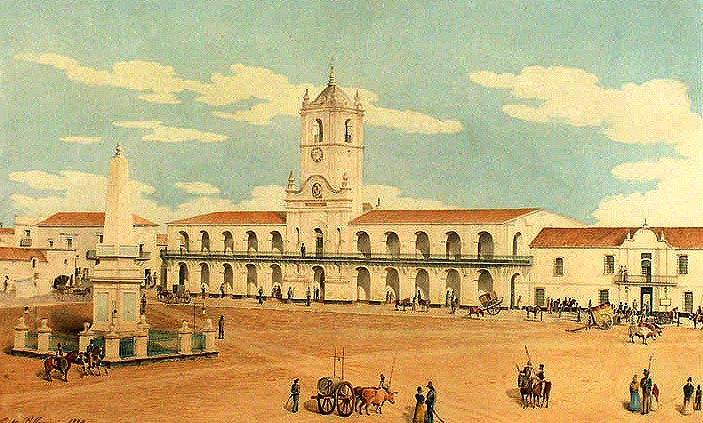
Plaza de la Victoria, watercolour, 1829.

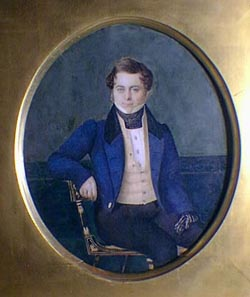
Don Manuel Bernardino, watercolour.

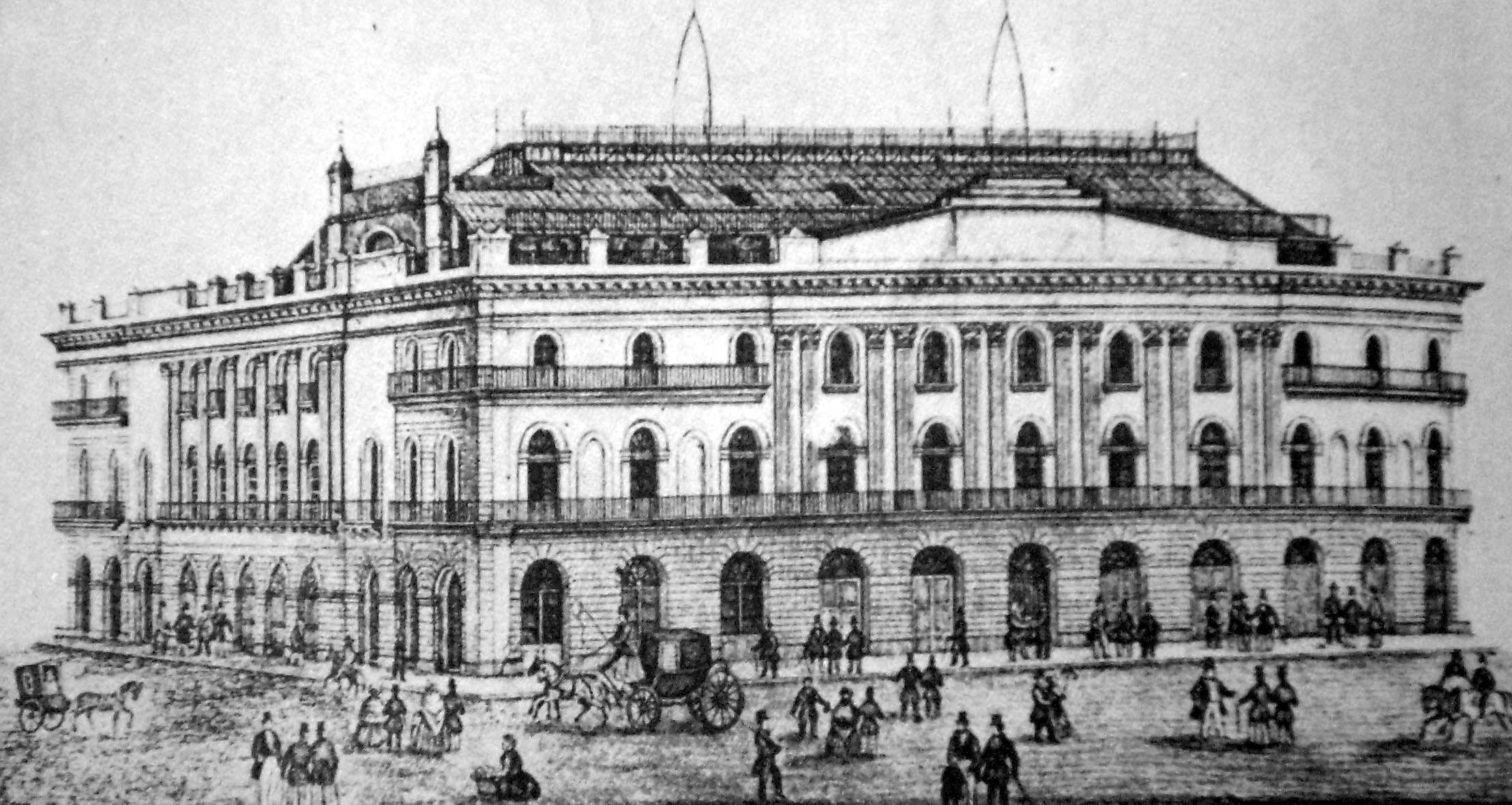
Teatro Colón, sketch.

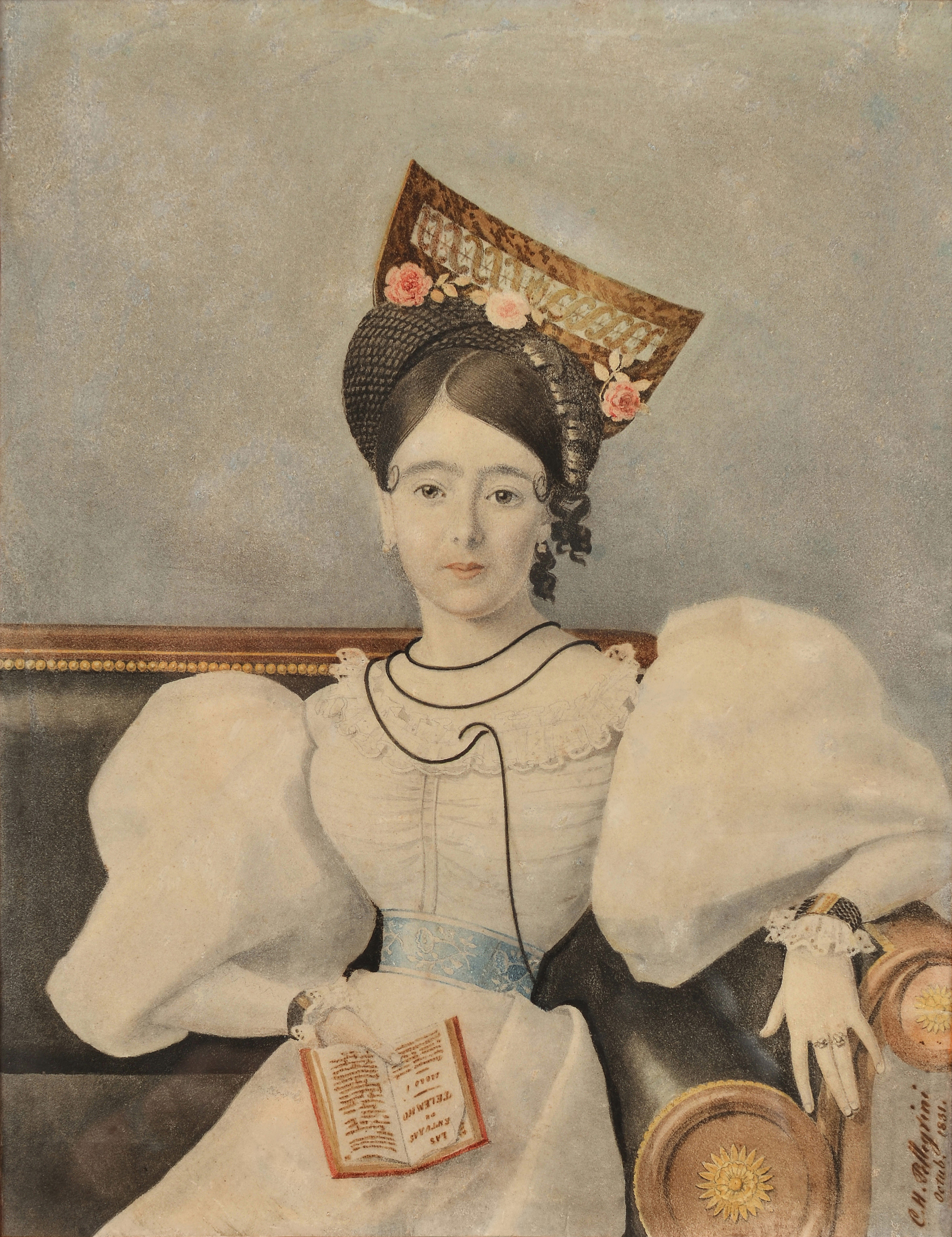
Doña Lucía Carranza de Rodríguez Orey, watercolour.

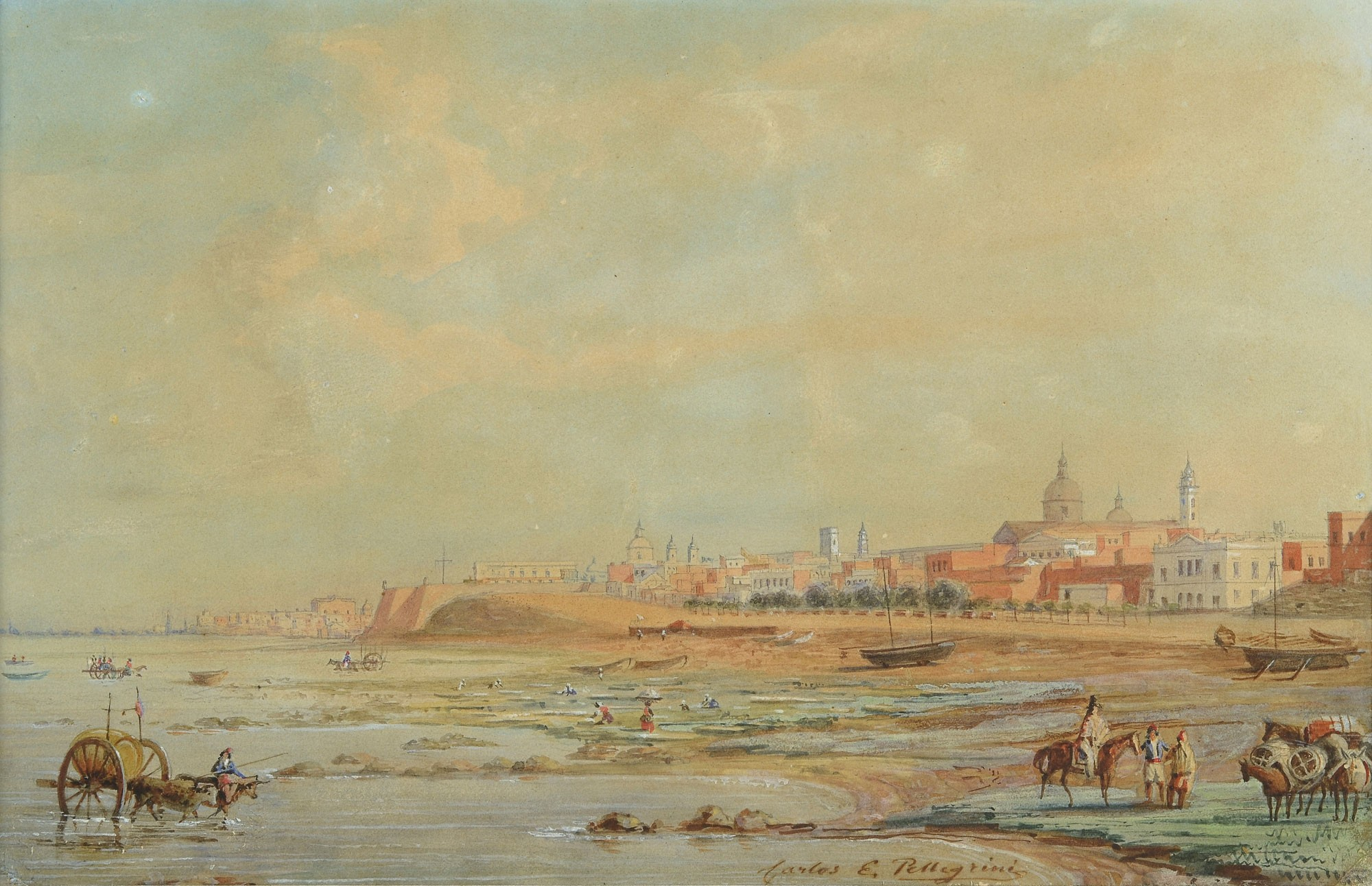
Buenos Aires view, watercolour.
