= Vile =

Vile may refer to:

== Characters ==
- Vile (Mega Man X), a character from the Mega Man X game series
- Doctor Vile (Dr. Weil), a character from the Mega Man Zero game series
- V.I.L.E., a fictional villain group in the Carmen Sandiego franchise

== Mythology ==
- An alternate spelling of Vili, the brother of Oden in Norse mythology
- Vile, the plural of Vila (fairy) in south Slavic mythology

== Music ==
- Vile (album), a 1996 album by the death metal band Cannibal Corpse
- Vile (band), an American death metal band
- "Vile", a song by Dave Grohl

== Places ==
- Vile, Raigad, Raigad district, Maharashtra, India; on the Pune–Kolad road
- Vile Parle, a suburb of Mumbai in India

== Other ==
- Vile: Exhumed, a 2025 video game
- Vile (film), a 2011 horror movie
- Vile (surname)
- Vile (text editor)

== See also ==
- Vial, a small container
- VIL (disambiguation)
- Vill, historical English administrative unit for small land holdings
- Viol, a musical instrument
- Weil (disambiguation), with a similar pronunciation
