= Vile (surname) =

Vile is a British surname which may refer to:

- Kris Vile, born 1989, Professional skateboarder.
- Curt Vile, pen name of Alan Moore (born 1953), English writer of comic books
- Job Vile (1845–1905), independent conservative Member of New Zealand Parliament
- Kurt Vile (born 1980), American guitarist and singer
- Tommy Vile (1882–1958), Welsh international rugby union player, served with distinction during the Great War and became High Sheriff of Monmouthshire for 1945.
- William Vile (1700–1767), English cabinetmaker of distinction rivaling contemporaries such as Chippingdale.
- Albion Vile (1843–1909), Marine engineer and inventor of improvements to the compound steam engine, part of the British development of steam engines that would power our great ships of the era, including the Dreadnought battleships and Titanic

The origin of the name is most likely from Danish a village or coastal area of Denmark that still exists today and named after the Norse pagan god Vile (Vili) the brother of Oden who created the earth with their brother Vi.

Other than Latin or French corruptions of the name Vile there is no real evidence of the surname in Britain prior to the 17th century. At the end of the 17th century there is a lot of evidence of an influx of people named Vile in areas of Somerset, South Wales, London and indeed to the US and other British colonies including India.

France in 1685 decided to throw out their Protestant "Huguenots", some 500,000 people were affected.

It is well known that the "Norse" population of southern Europe favored the Protestant teaching of Luther and Calvin this would have branded them for expulsion.

In Somerset the influx of Huguenot immigrants named Vile coincides with the dreadful events of 1685 and the Monmouth uprising. The subsequent murder and enslavement of hundreds if not thousands of Somerset men under the order of James the 2nd, John Churchill and Judge Jeffreys. Samuel Vile was hung drawn and quartered as a result of these dreadful actions in Frome Somerset during September 1685.

The Monmouth uprising caused Somerset to be deprived of a generation of breadwinners they desperately needed to replace them and the Huguenots were welcomed with open arms.

== See also ==
- Fiel (disambiguation)
- Fill (disambiguation)#Surname
- Pfeil (disambiguation)
- Armand Le Véel (1821–1905), French sculptor
- Veil (disambiguation)#Family name
- Viel (name)
- Weil (surname)
