= Vil =

Vil may refer to

== People ==
- Vil Lipatov (1927–1979), Soviet writer
- Vil Mirzayanov (born 1935), Soviet-born American chemical weapons expert
- Guy Saint-Vil (born 1942), Haitian football forward
- Melissa St. Vil (born 1983), Haitian-American boxer

== Media ==
- Cruella de Vil, a character from the 1956 novel The Hundred and One Dalmatians
- Jeg vil, a 2008 song by Danish singer Basim
- Vil Ambu, 2016 Indian Tamil-language action film

== Other ==
- VIL (disambiguation)
- Villa Vil, a village and municipality in Argentina
- garrote vil, a strangling weapon
- Glossary of pre-Christian Lithuanian names#vil, a common stem in Lithuanian names
