= SMS Pfeil =

SMS Pfeil is the name of the following ships of the German Navy:

- SMS Pfeil (1860), a Jäger-class gunboat decommissioned in 1871
- SMS Pfeil (1882), a Blitz-class aviso scrapped in 1922

== See also ==
- Pfeil (disambiguation)
