= Weill =

Weill is an educational institution affiliated with Cornell University, named after Sanford I. Weill and may refer to:

- Weill Institute for Cell and Molecular Biology, research institute located on Cornell University's Ithaca, NY campus
- Weill Medical College of Cornell University, medical school located in New York City
- Weill Cornell Graduate School of Medical Sciences, graduate college for biomedical sciences located in New York City
- Weill Medical College in Qatar, medical school located in Qatar

== See also ==
- Weil (disambiguation)
- Weil (surname), also listing people with the surname "Weill"
