= Doctor Weil =

Doctor Weil may refer to:

- Andrew Weil, American author and physician, proponent of alternative medicine
- André Weil (1906–1988), French mathematician
- Doctor Weil (Mega Man Zero), a character in the Mega Man Zero video game series

== See also ==
- Weil (disambiguation)
