= Weil (company) =

Defunct French clothing company based in Besançon

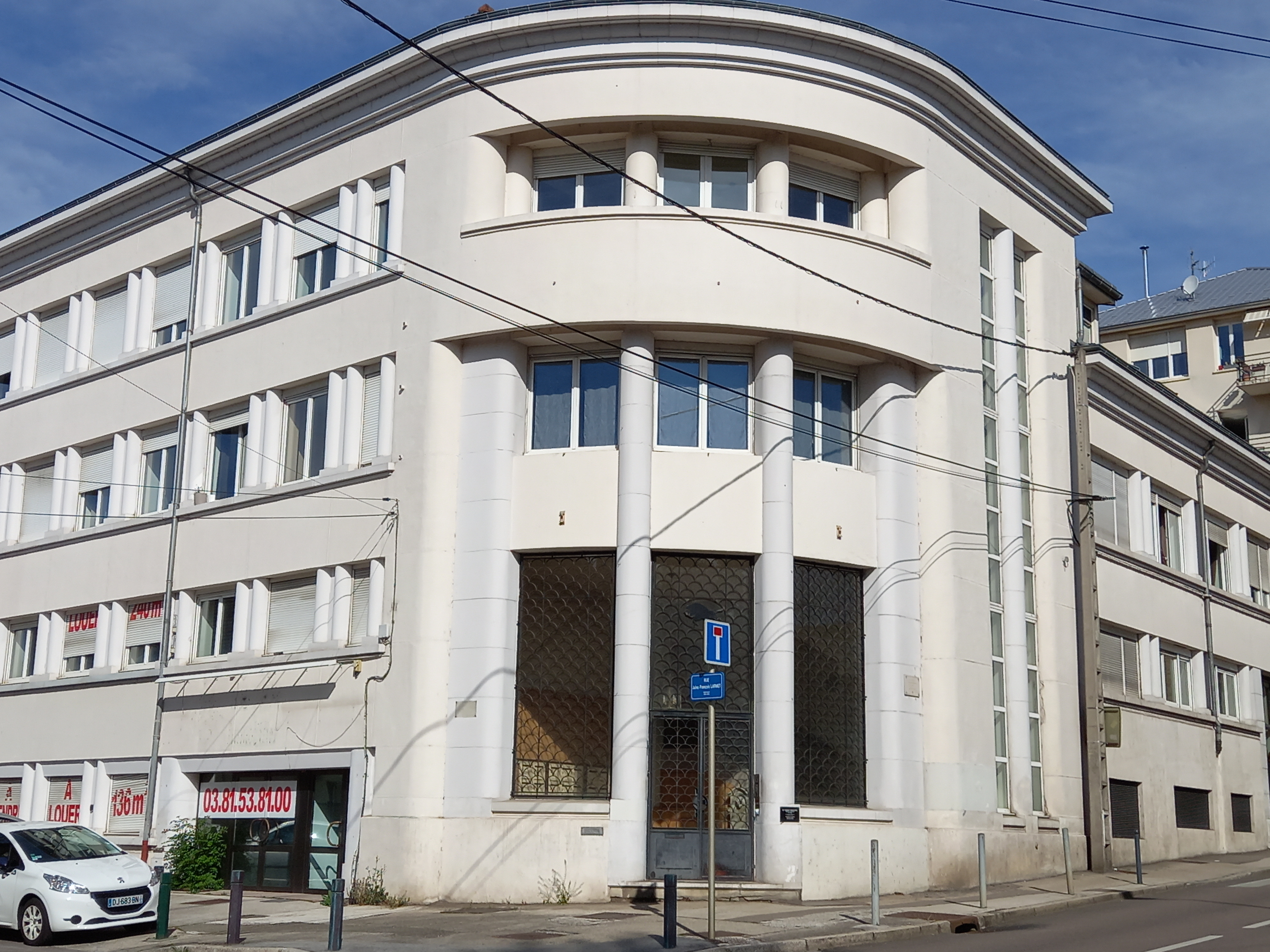
- Formerly: Weil-Jaudel (around 1930) Les fils de Joseph Weil (around 1970)
- Industry: Textile
- Founded: 1860, 1868 or 1870 depending on sources
- Founder: Joseph Weil
- Defunct: 2007: acquisition by Laporte
- Headquarters: Besançon, France
- Key people: Joseph, Benard, Henri, Michel, Denis, Philippe, Jean-Pierre and Didier Weil
- Products: Capes then men's clothing

Weil was a clothing factory, originally from Besançon. Founded by Joseph Weil at the end of the 19th century, it became, during the 1960s, the most important French company in the textile industry, before disappearing at the beginning of the 2000s.

It is known notably for its franchises Luc Saint Alban and Carnet de Vol.

== Company history ==
=== 1860s to 1892 ===
Founded in Besançon by Joseph Weil, born in Dijon on November 15, 1838., the founding date of the Weil company differs according to sources.

While the press regularly mentions its creation in 1868, in Histoire de Besançon the historian Claude Fohlen mentions the date of 1860. This latter date is unlikely, given that, according to civil records, Joseph Weil married in Saint-Marcel, in Saône-et-Loire on December 15, 1864, and practiced the trade of merchant trader in Fraisans, in the Jura department.

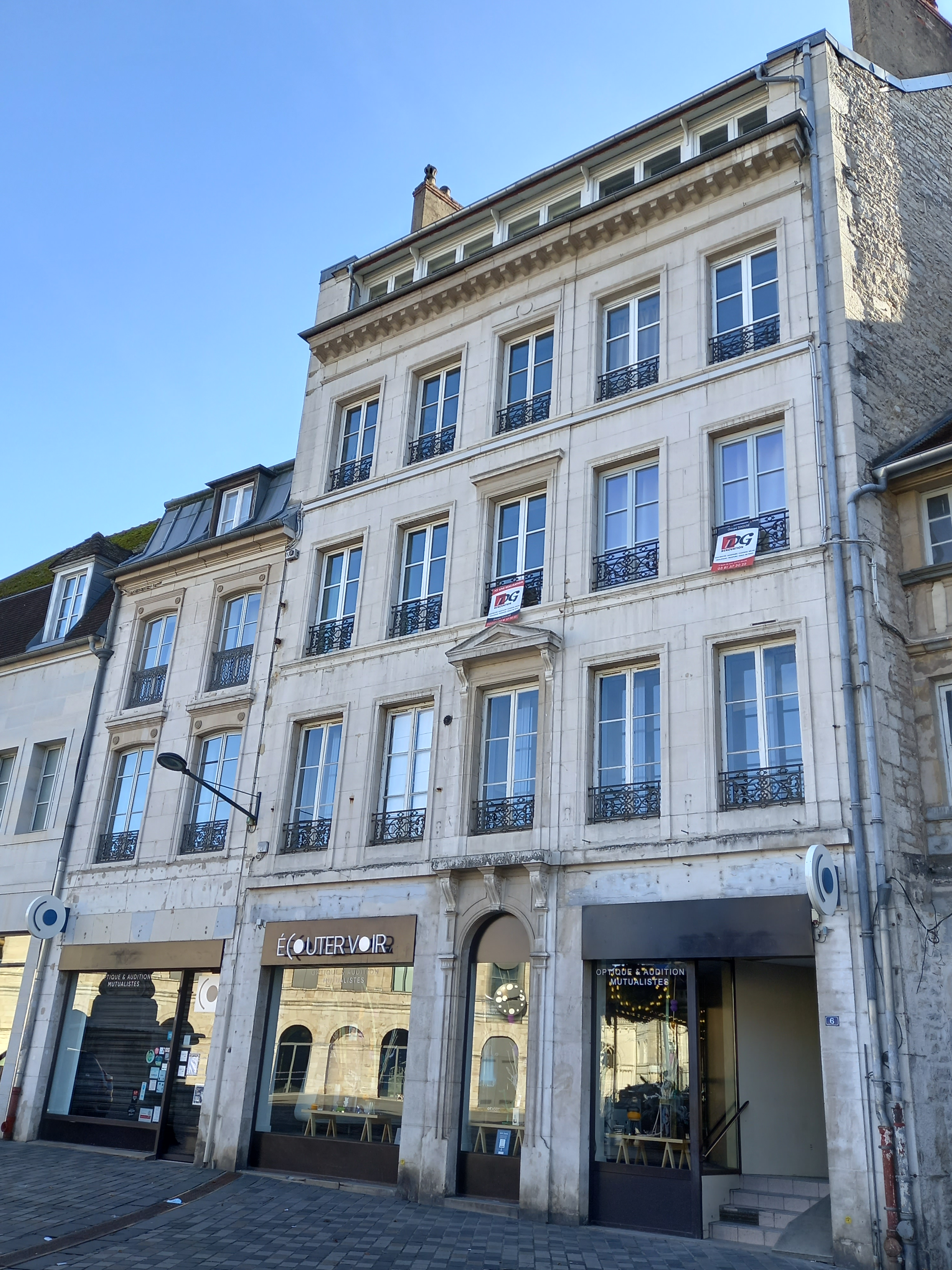
6 and 8 Place de la Révolution, in February 2022.

According to Raphaël Favereaux, a regional author, Weil only appeared in Besançon around 1870. Still according to Favereaux, it was, at first, located Place Labourey, current Place de la Révolution, Besançon.

Initially the company manufactured pelerines, in an artisanal way, before converting to men's clothing.

According to Claude Fohlen, in 1878, Weil was one of the largest clothing factories in the city.

Joseph Weil died in Besançon on September 20, 1892.

=== 1898 to 1930 ===
However, according to the directory, the name "Weil" seems to appear only from 1898.

The company is still located Place Labourey at number 8, under the name Veuve Weil, then at 26 Grande Rue, under the name Weil. This latter site disappeared in 1900.

The Veuve Weil establishment is also located at 74 Grande Rue in 1899 and 1900.

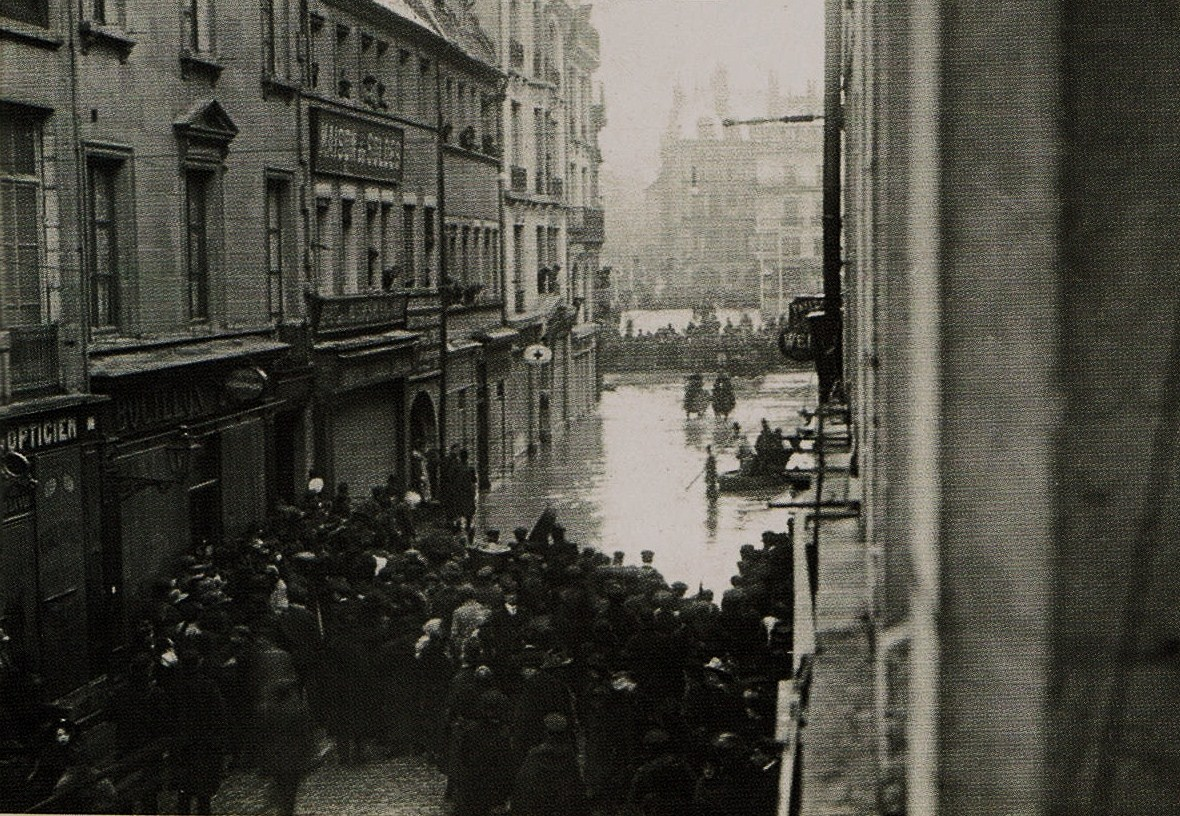
Lower part of the Grande Rue in Besançon flooded, during the 1910 Doubs flood. Unknown photographer.

The company moved to 10 Grande Rue, in 1905 according to Fohlen, in 1909 according to the directory. It is also, and briefly, located at 1 Place Saint-Amour from 1909, until 1911.

According to the testimony of former employees, collected by Violaine Schwartz, Weil was affected by several floods of the Doubs.

=== 1930 to 1959 ===
According to the prefecture, in 1930, the company is listed under the name Weil-Jaudel and employs 68 employees. According to Pierre Daclin, at that time, Weil employed more than 600 people, including about 532 at home.

In 1933, the Jaudel company was closed. Weil took over its workshop, the first taylorized company of the firm. The company was little affected by the Great Depression. It was, at that time, directed by Albert Weil.

At the beginning of World War II the premises served as a hospital, before being taken over by the Houdard house from Dijon. Several members of the FFI stole uniforms there. Abbé Gallois, chaplain of the maquis, celebrated several masses there in the open air.

=== 1959 to 1976 ===
In 1959, Weil manufactured nearly two million pieces of clothing. That same year, the company located at 10 Grande Rue was replaced by a store of the Uniprix brand.

In 1960 Weil moved to Fontaine-Écu, Rue Chaillot. In 1961, it opened a new production site in Dole, thus hiring 100 additional people.

In 1962, it was part, alongside the Compagnie des compteurs, Supérior-Maveg and Unimel, of the four Bisontine companies employing between 500 and 1000 employees.

Weil continued to grow until becoming the most important French men's textile company in 1965, employing 1,500 people. That same year, it moved to Rue de Vesoul, in the former premises of the Brochet biscuit factory. Albert Weil died on September 22 of the same year.

During the 1970s, it was named Les fils de Joseph Weil. From 1973, it subcontracted part of the production in a factory in Székesfehérvár, in Hungary. It employed 1,500 people in 1975 and 1976.

=== Early 1980s ===
The early 1980s strongly affected the textile market, which fell by 9% in volume in the space of two years.

While, according to Jean-Pierre Tenoux, journalist for Le Monde, Weil had 1550 employees in 1979, for Claude Fohlen, from 1976 to 1982, in the context of the first then the second oil shock, Weil's workforce went from 1500 to 1300 employees. In 1981, Bernard Weil, former resistant and CEO of the company, hired about ten Thai refugees.

In 1985, the company's annual turnover, which bet on technological modernity, was 700 million francs, progressing by 6% compared to the previous year. In the spring of 1986, it maintained 3rd place in this sector, employed 1250 people and invested up to 10 million francs per year. Its annual production was approximately 871,000 garments and 1,600,000 pants. It was then located on Rue de Vesoul, but also Boulevard Léon Blum and at Tilleroyes.

In 1986 it created the Luc Saint Alban franchise.

=== 1987 to 1989 ===
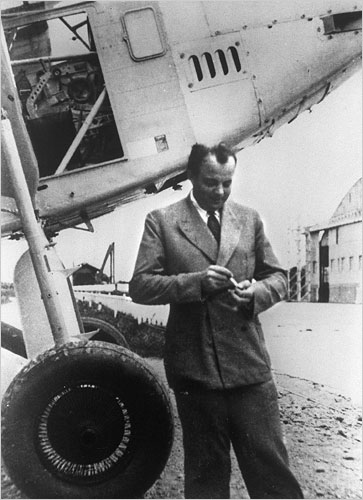
Antoine Saint-Exupéry, in 1933.

In 1987, when it employed 1200 people, including a majority of women, Weil announced a "modernization plan". In reaction, the CGT-Weil proposed a reduction in imports as well as the return of certain large orders.

In 1989, its turnover was 1.2 billion francs. Between October and June 1991, it eliminated 108 of the 980 jobs in the Besançon companies. The management explained that this decision was due to the growth of imports. It was this same year that Weil developed the Carnet de Vol brand.

=== 1989 to 2002 ===
In August 1991, Weil invested in a new factory on the outskirts of Székesfehérvár. In the fall of the same year, Henri, Philippe, Jean-Pierre and Didier Weil sold their shares. For its part, the management decided to close the Dole site. During this period, the Rue de Vesoul factory also closed its doors.

In 1993, Weil employed 280 people in its Hungarian companies and then owned 91% of their capital. Weil then produced only 10% of its production in France. In 1995, 75% of production was carried out in the Tunisian, Hungarian and Romanian factories.

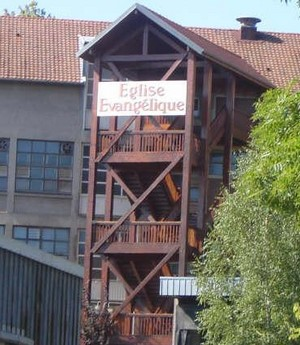
Church on Rue Larmet, in 2008.

On July 13, 1995, justifying production costs that were too high, it presented a job elimination plan. In August 1995, when it was national No. 2 and employed 662 employees, Weil laid off 182 at its Besançon site and kept 6. Several others were reassigned to other sites.

In September 1995, the Rue Larmet site closed and Creusot-vêtement was placed in receivership.

On October 30, 1998, the CEO, Denis Weil, announced a loss of 185 million francs over the last 4 years. In November of the same year, Weil had 410 employees including 330 in Besançon. On November 2, it was placed in receivership, and the following month announced the elimination of 215 positions. CGT-Weil demanded the relocation of the 400 jobs located in the Maghreb, Eastern Europe and Asia. Denis Weil refused, estimating the annual cost of 150 million francs too high.

In January 1999, having relocated a large part of its production to Tunisia and Hungary, it eliminated 215 positions.

=== 2002 to 2007 ===
In 2002, Weil employed only 130 employees. That same year, the company contracted a debt of 2.5 million euros, related to a dispute with the tax authorities regarding the company's status. The latter being considered by the taxes as a commercial company while it was an industrial company. Following a request from the deputy of Doubs, Claude Girard to Francis Mer, Minister of Industry, the debt was canceled.

In 2007, Weil was acquired by Laporte, which notably obtained the Luc-Saint-Alban license. However, it ceased its activity in 2014.

== Products ==
=== Carnet de Vol ===
The Carnet de Vol franchise was created in 1989 by Michel Weil, it is named in reference to Antoine de Saint-Exupéry. In 2005, it was acquired by the Italian group Gruppo Industrie Moda. It filed for bankruptcy in 2019.

=== Other franchises and products ===
The company also produced the Luc Saint Alban suit brand, which was born in 1986, or the John-Stevens and Weil-1868 brands. Weil also produced for other brands such as Ted Lapidusand Guy Laroche.

== Management and shareholders ==
Founded by Joseph Weil, the company remained in the hands of its descendants. However, in the fall of 1991, part of the family, descendants of Albert Weil (Henri, Philippe, Jean-Pierre and Didier Weil) disengaged from the company in favor of Denis, Bertrand and Michel, heirs of Paul Weil. Denis Weil was the last manager of the company.

Albert Weil was president of the Jewish community of Besançon. Around 2009, it was managed by Bertrand Weil.

== Famous clients ==
Weil counted among its clients Gustave Courbet, for whom it made capes, but also Jean Marais, Jean-Paul Belmondo, for whom it designed a suit for the film À bout de souffle by Jean-Luc Godard, or Johnny Hallyday. The latter even visited the factory.

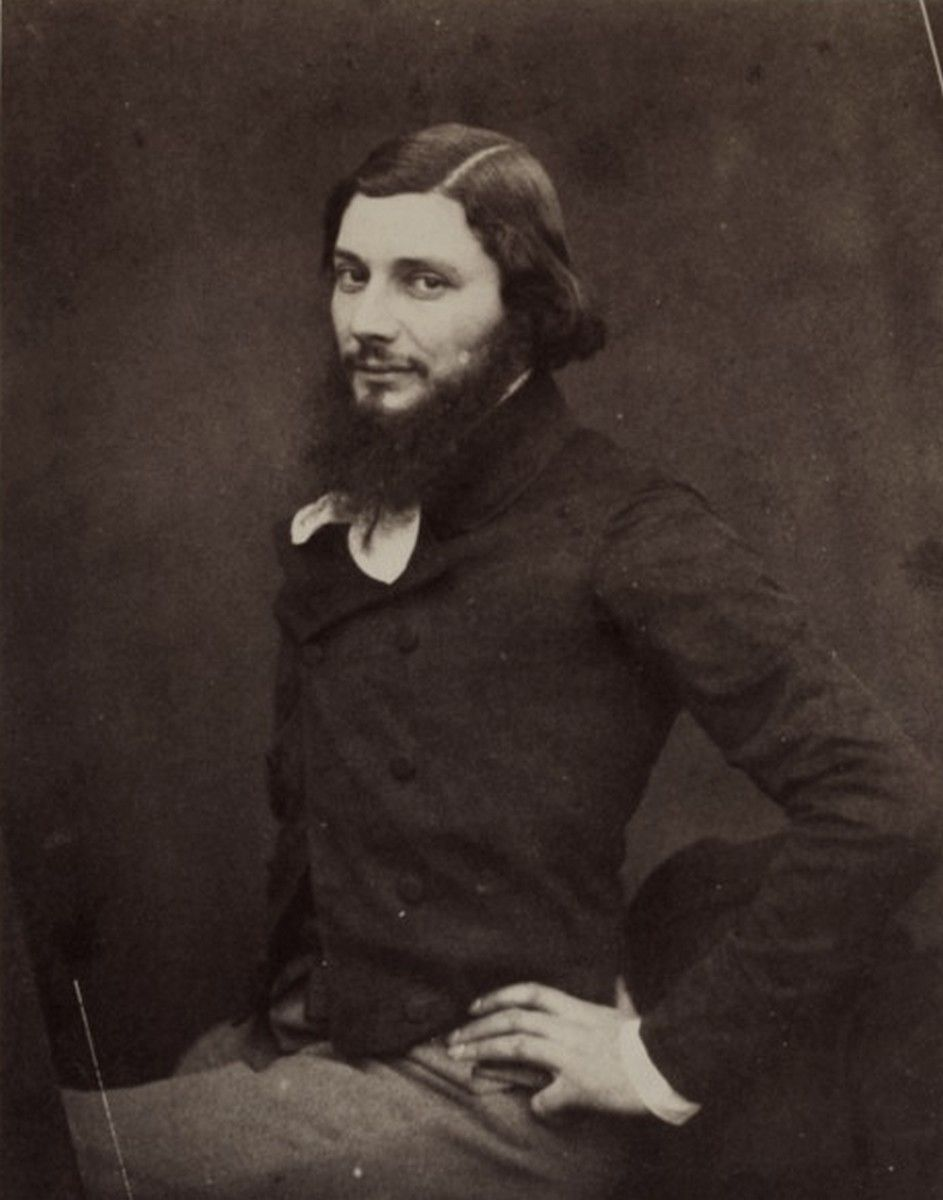
Gustave Courbet, photographed by Félix Nadar.

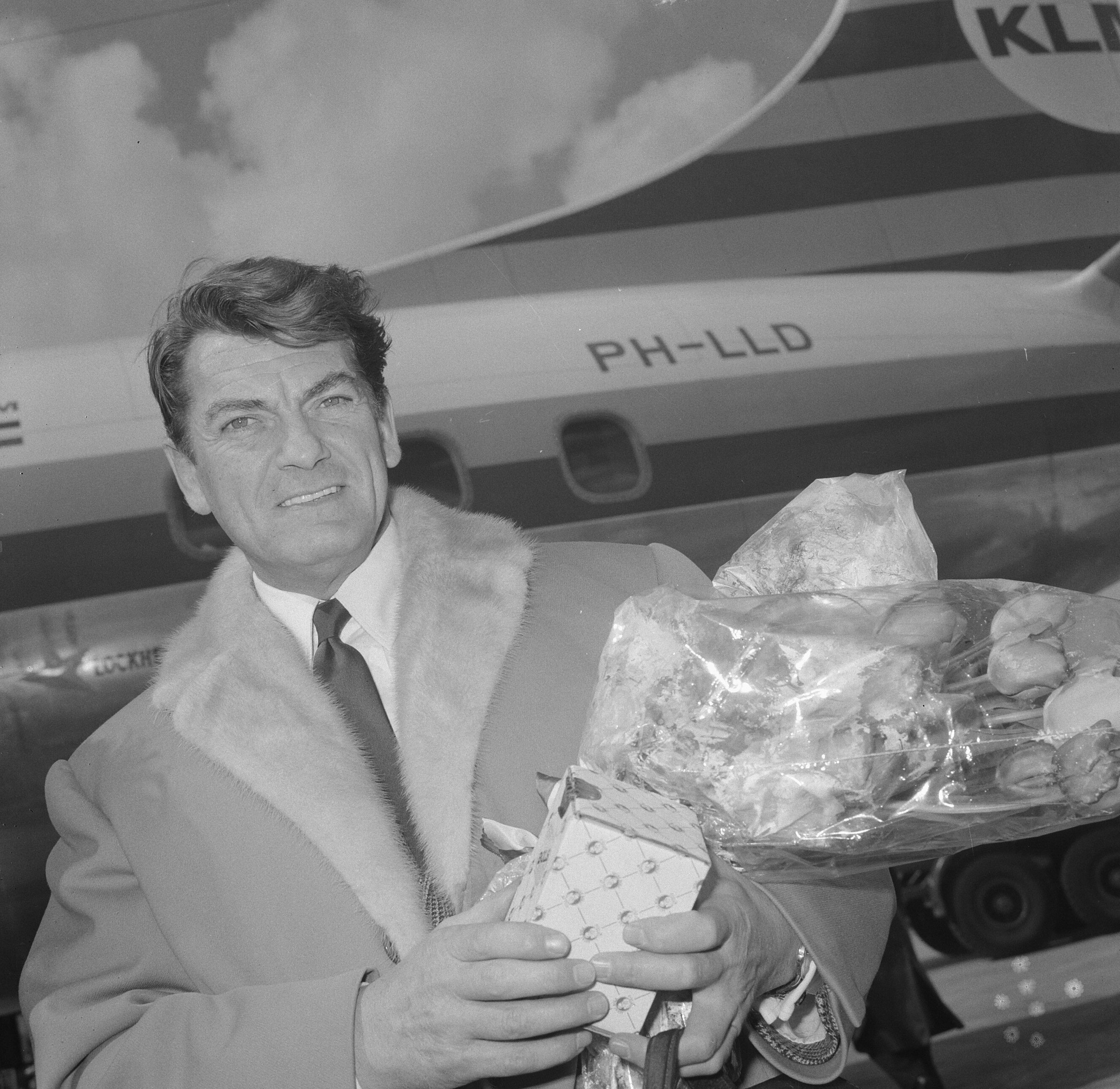
Jean Marais photographed by Jack Jersey, in 1961.

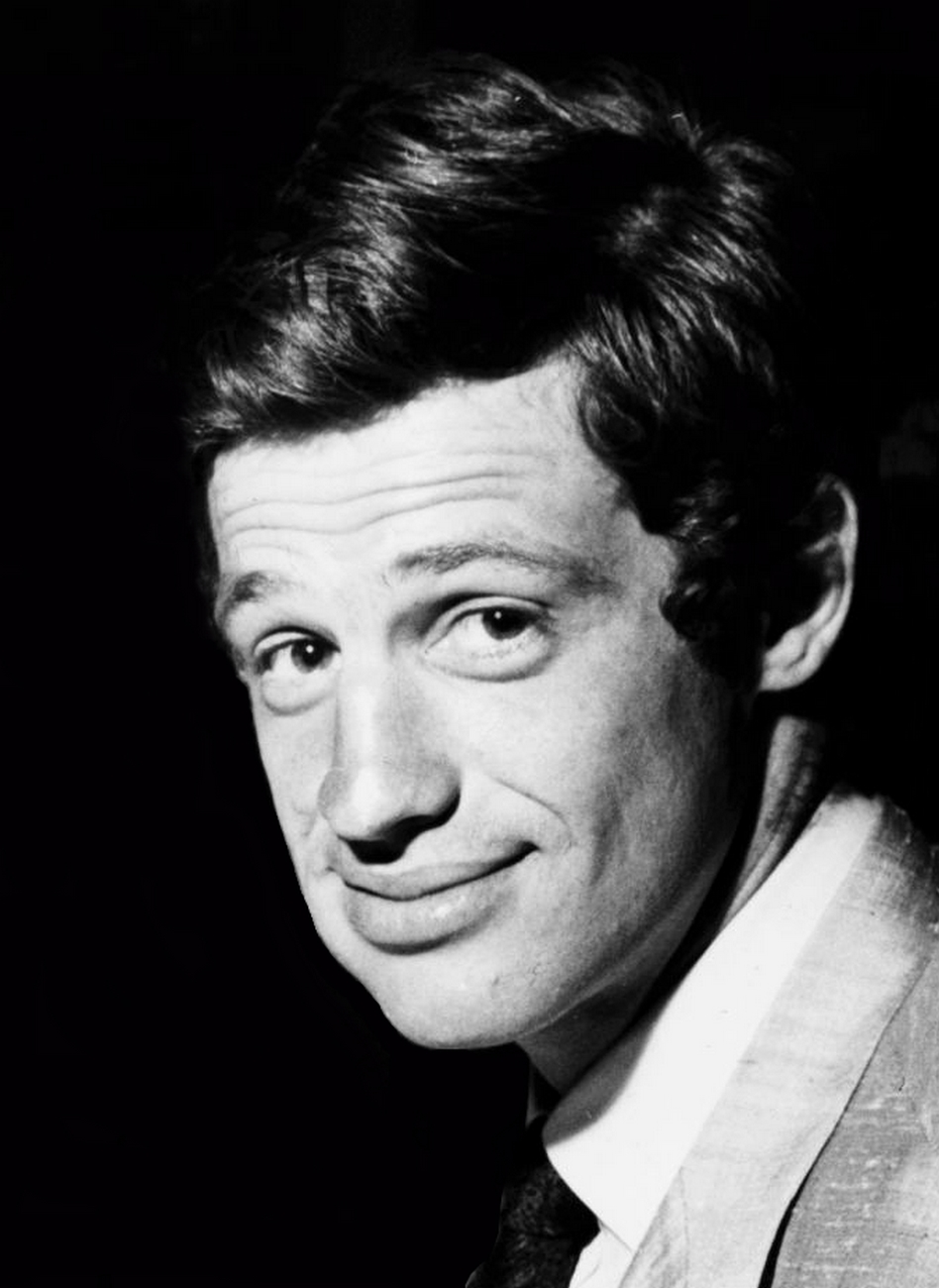
Belmondo in 1960. Keystone Paris.

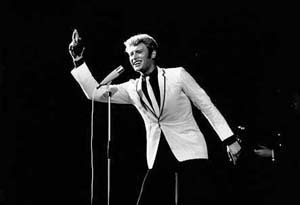
Johnny Hallyday photographed by Erling Mandelmann, in 1965.

== Social movements ==
Although little affected by the Great Depression, on June 17, 1936, Weil saw its three production sites blocked by nearly 400 strikers.

From May 68, and for several years, the company was marked by numerous walkouts. Notably to protest against piecework wages. The movement organized and established a weekly picket line on Wednesdays. According to the testimony of an employee, collected in 1975 by Front Rouge, organ of the Parti communiste révolutionnaire (marxist-leninist), the boss allegedly punched several strikers, threatened others with a blowtorch, or equipped the supervisors with batons.

In November 1987, in the context of a "restructuring plan", several walkouts took place.

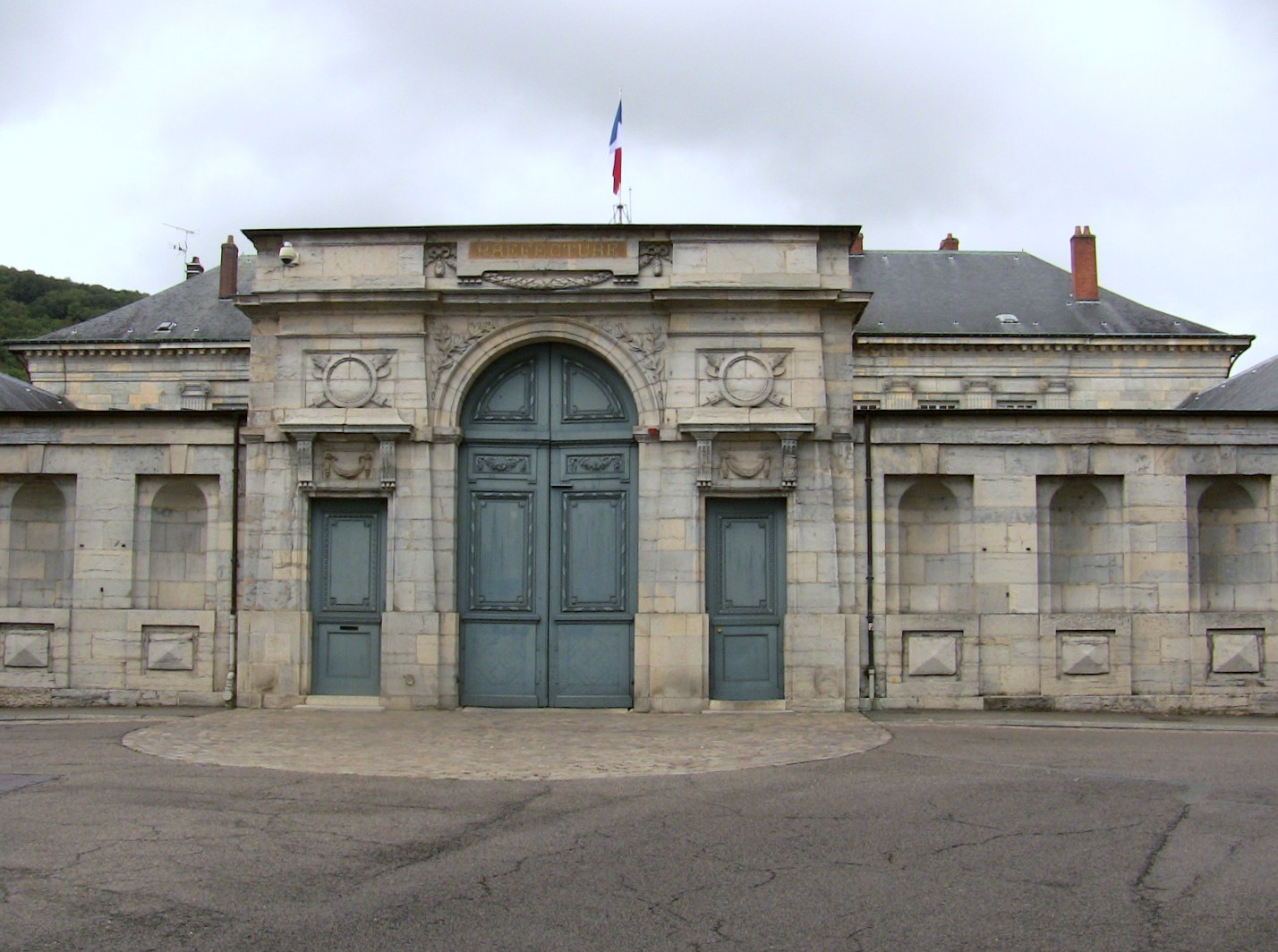

In July 1995, some employees went to the prefecture where a delegation was received. On August 16, employees built a barricade on Rue de Vesoul, then about twenty people decided to block the logistics center. Several acts of sabotage occurred.

While the great Lip march of September 29, 1973, had mobilized more than 100,000 demonstrators, on November 9, 1998, only about a hundred people went to the prefecture carrying a coffin. The unionist Jacques Bauquier explained this low mobilization due to the long decline of the company and the fatalism of the population.

From January 28, 1999, following a blockade of the store by its employees, the latter organized, for a week, a huge clearance sale to finance their layoffs.

== Commemoration and culture ==
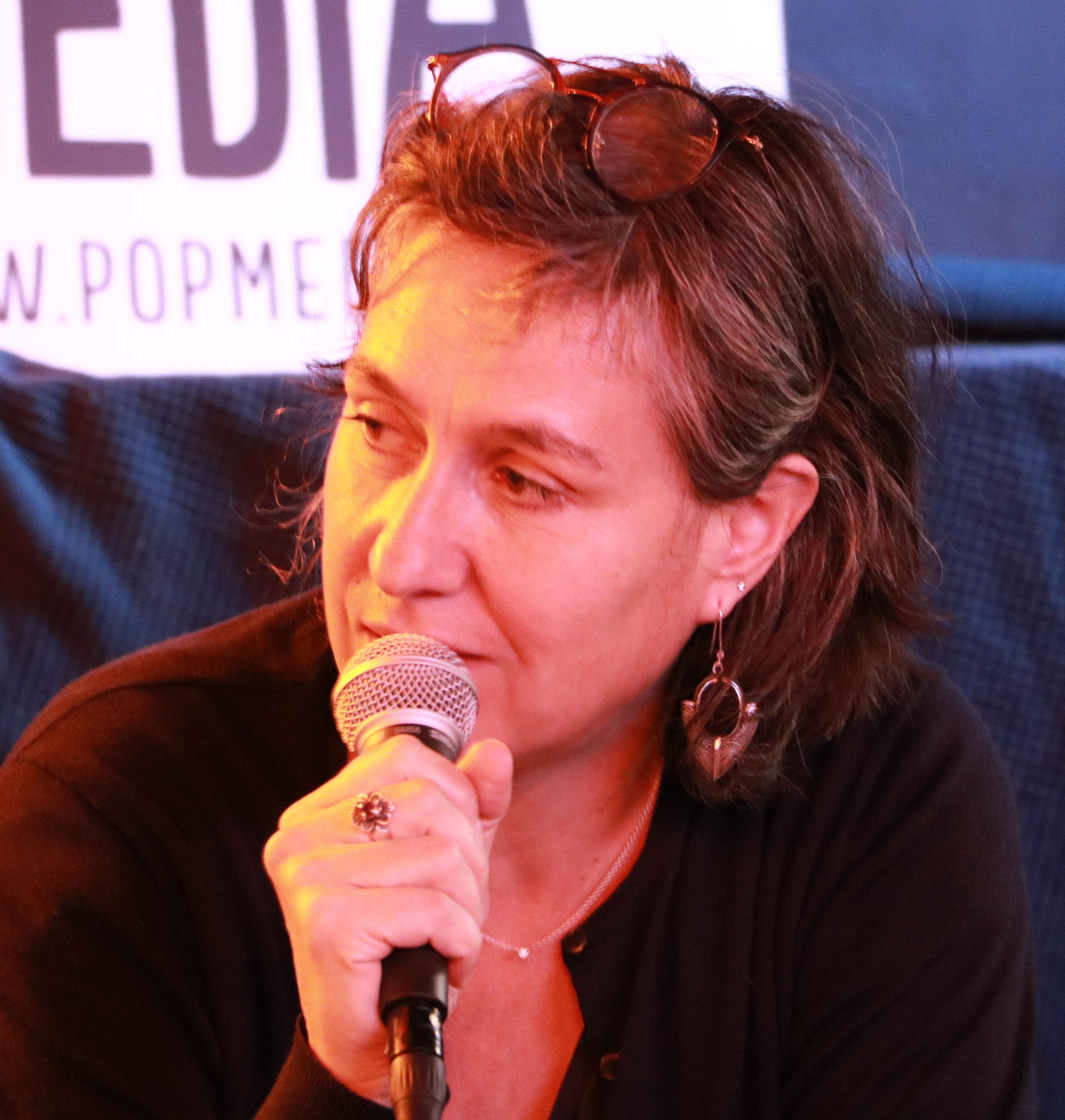
Violaine Schwartz at the MidiMinuit Festival in Nantes, in 2021

In May 2010, during memorial exhibitions in Besançon, the painter Martin Gunther exhibited his paintings at the Chapel of the Théâtre Bacchus, and the photographer Stephan Girard his photos at the Jean Greset gallery. A picnic gathering former employees was also organized at the Gare d'Eau park.

In 2015, the play Tableaux de Weil was performed, written by Violaine Schwartz and directed by Irène Bonnaud. Written based on the testimonies of several former female workers, it was staged and performed by the students of the DEUST Theater of the University of Franche-Comté. On the occasion of one of the performances, Bertrand Weil came on stage to express his discontent.

In May 2016, a fictional radio series in five episodes, entitled Le temps des Weil, by Violaine Schwartz, was broadcast on France Culture.

== Besançon after Weil ==
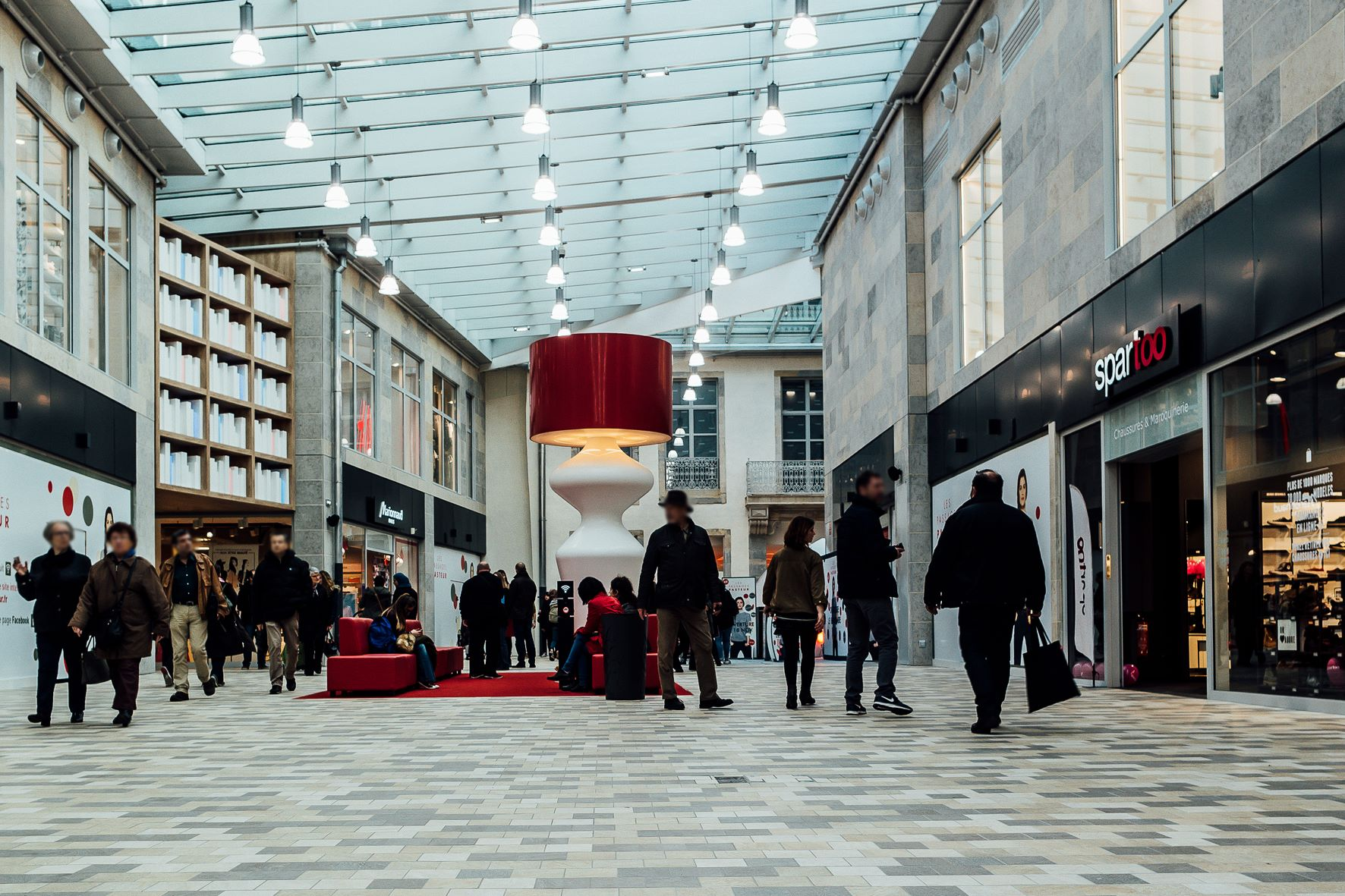
Central courtyard of the Passages Pasteur, in 2015.

In 2006, hydrocarbon pollution, due to a punctured fuel tank, was noted on the Pasteur block. According to archaeologist Claudine Munier, it probably belonged to the Weil factory. Around 2007, the city of Besançon acquired the premises

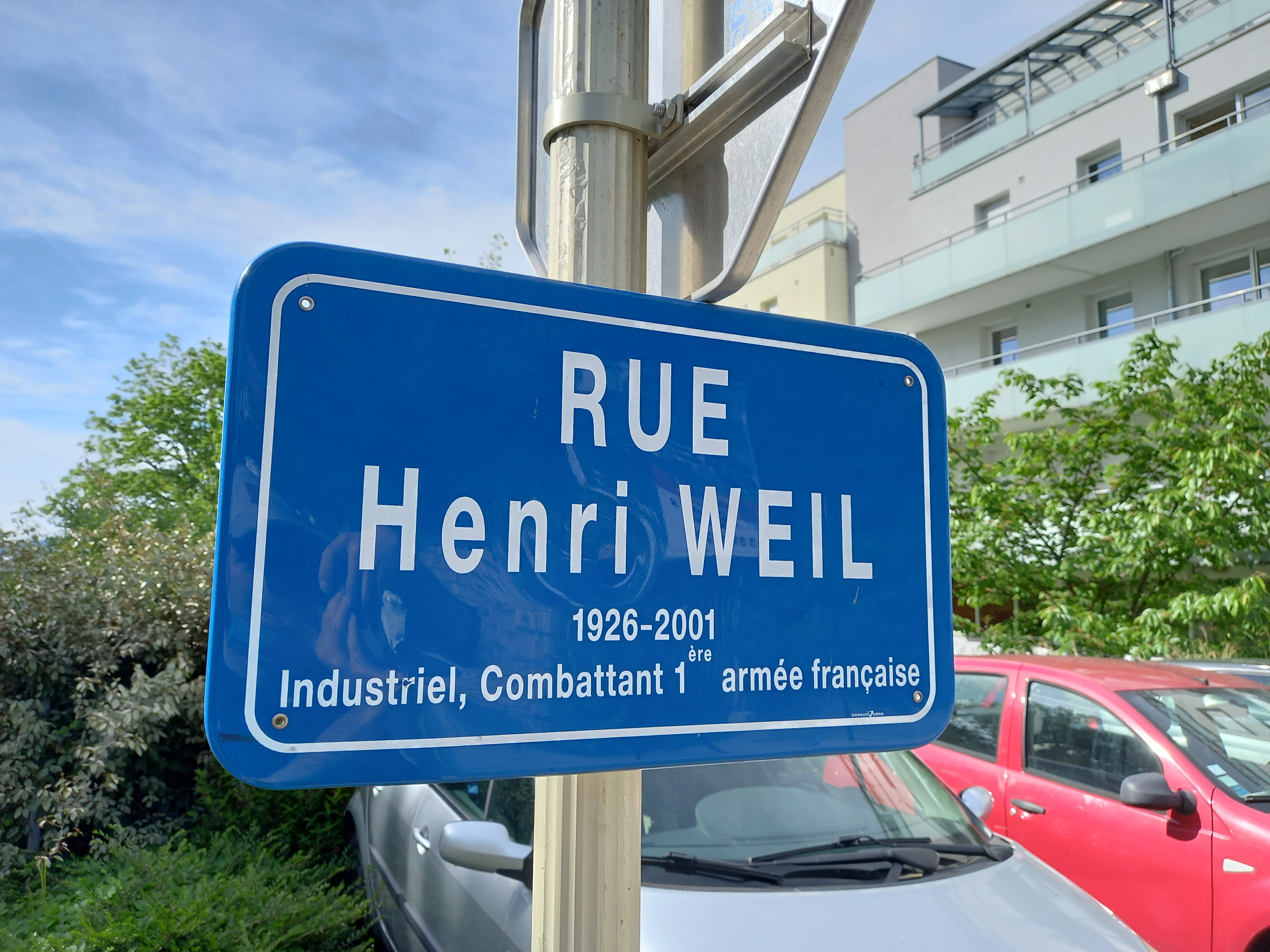

In 2009, the production site on Rue de Chaillot was razed. In March 2011 and in 2015, the HLM organization Néolia built housing there

Until July 2019, the shopping gallery of the Passages Pasteur housed a boutique of the Carnet de Vol brand., former Weil franchise

Today, 4 Rue Larmet in Besançon, former production site of the Weil factories, is occupied by an evangelical church.

A street in Besançon bears the name of Henri Weil, who died in 2001.

== Bibliography ==
- Daclin, Pierre (1968). La crise des années 30 à Besançon [The crisis of the 1930s in Besançon] (in French). Paris: Les belles lettres. p. 136.
- Barthelet, Françoise; Vernus, Michel; Roche, Max (1996). "Weill (Famille)" [Weill (Family)]. In Roche, Max (ed.). Dictionnaire biographique de département du Doubs (in French). Arts et littérature S.A.R.L..
- Schwartz, Violaine (2015). Comment on freine ? : suivi de Tableaux de Weil [How do we slow down?: follow-up to Weil's Tables] (in French). Éditions P.O.L. ISBN 978-2-8180-3751-5.
