= Fichu =

Women's clothing of triangle-folded kerchief

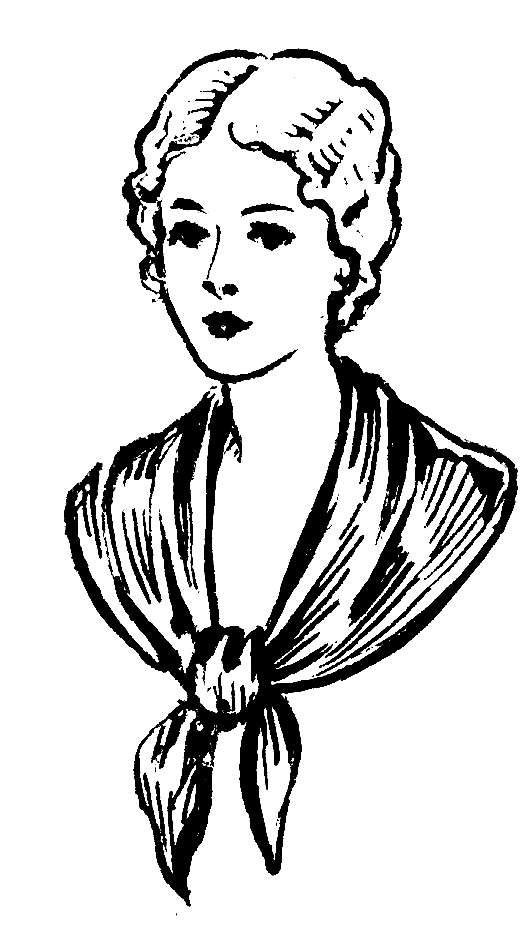
Descriptive drawing.

A fichu (/ˈfiːʃuː/, from the French "thrown over") is a large, square kerchief worn by women to fill in the low neckline of a bodice. Similar to a pelerine.

== Description ==
It originated in the United Kingdom in the 18th century and remained popular there and in France through the 19th with many variations, as well as in the United States. The fichu was generally of linen fabric and was folded diagonally into a triangle and tied, pinned, or tucked into the bodice in front.

A fichu is sometimes used with a brooch to conceal the closure of a décolleté neckline. The fichu can thus be fastened in the front, or crossed over the chest. The cross-over fichu sometimes extended all the way to the back. Some models include a large over-the-shoulders back piece.

The fichu found in several traditional cultures resembles a poncho that covers only the shoulders and chest.

== Gallery ==
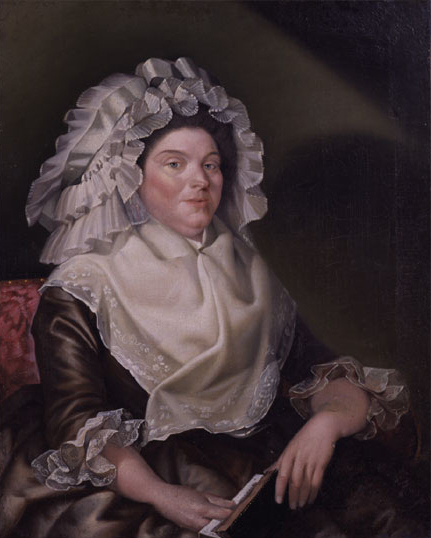
Elizabeth Sewall Salisbury wears an embroidered fichu pinned at the neck, 1789.

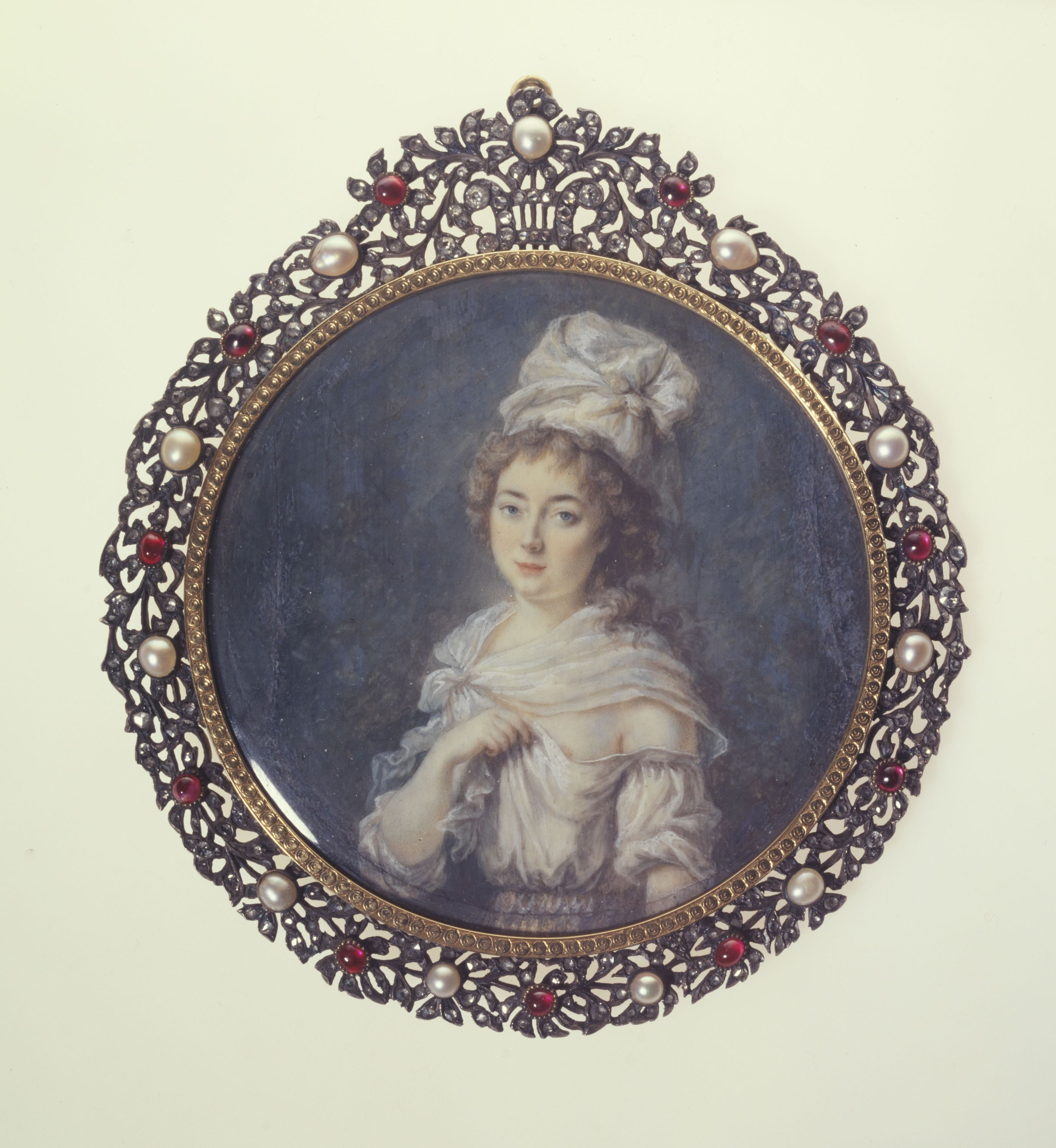
Jeune femme au fichu blanc, between 1790 and 1800

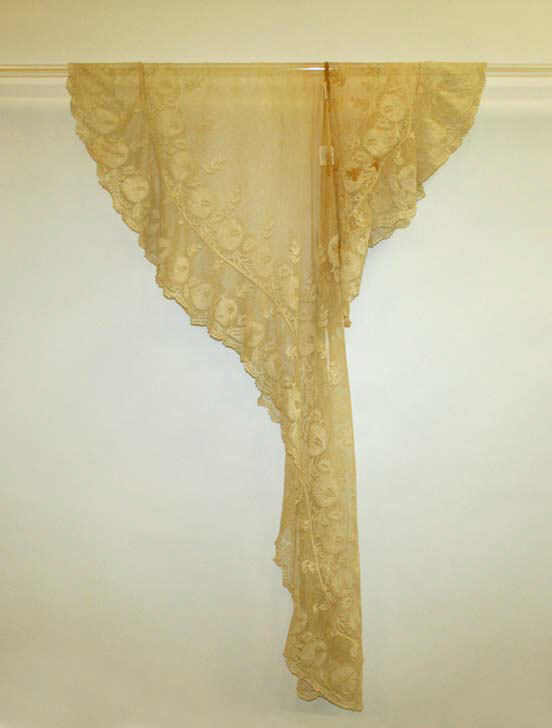
American or European, cotton, mid-19th century.

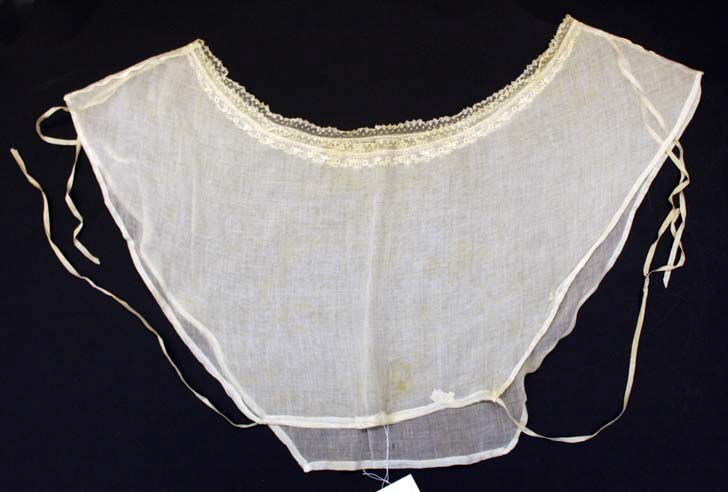
Probably American, cotton, mid-19th century.

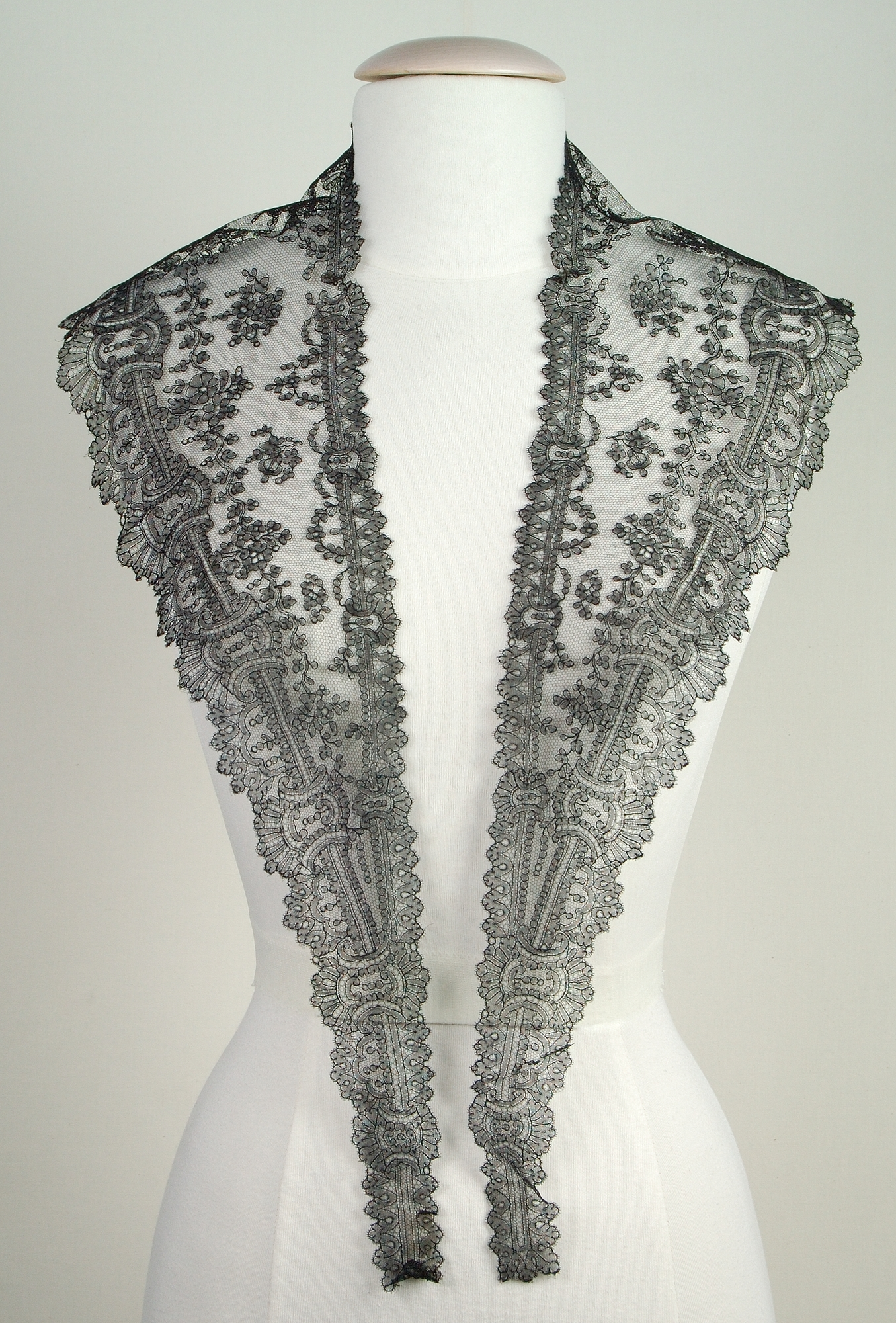
French, silk, mid-19th century.

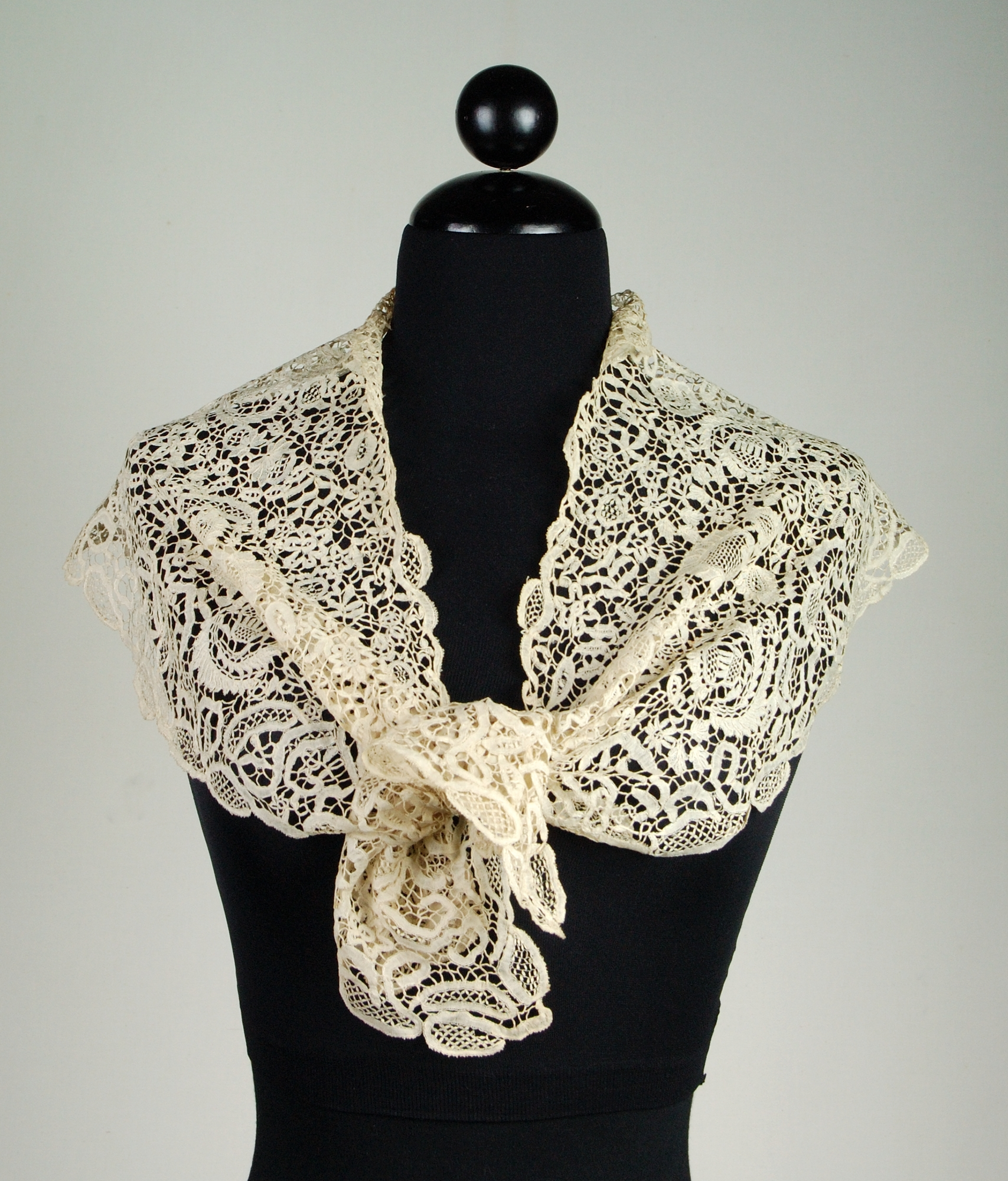
British, linen, knotted, mid-19th century.

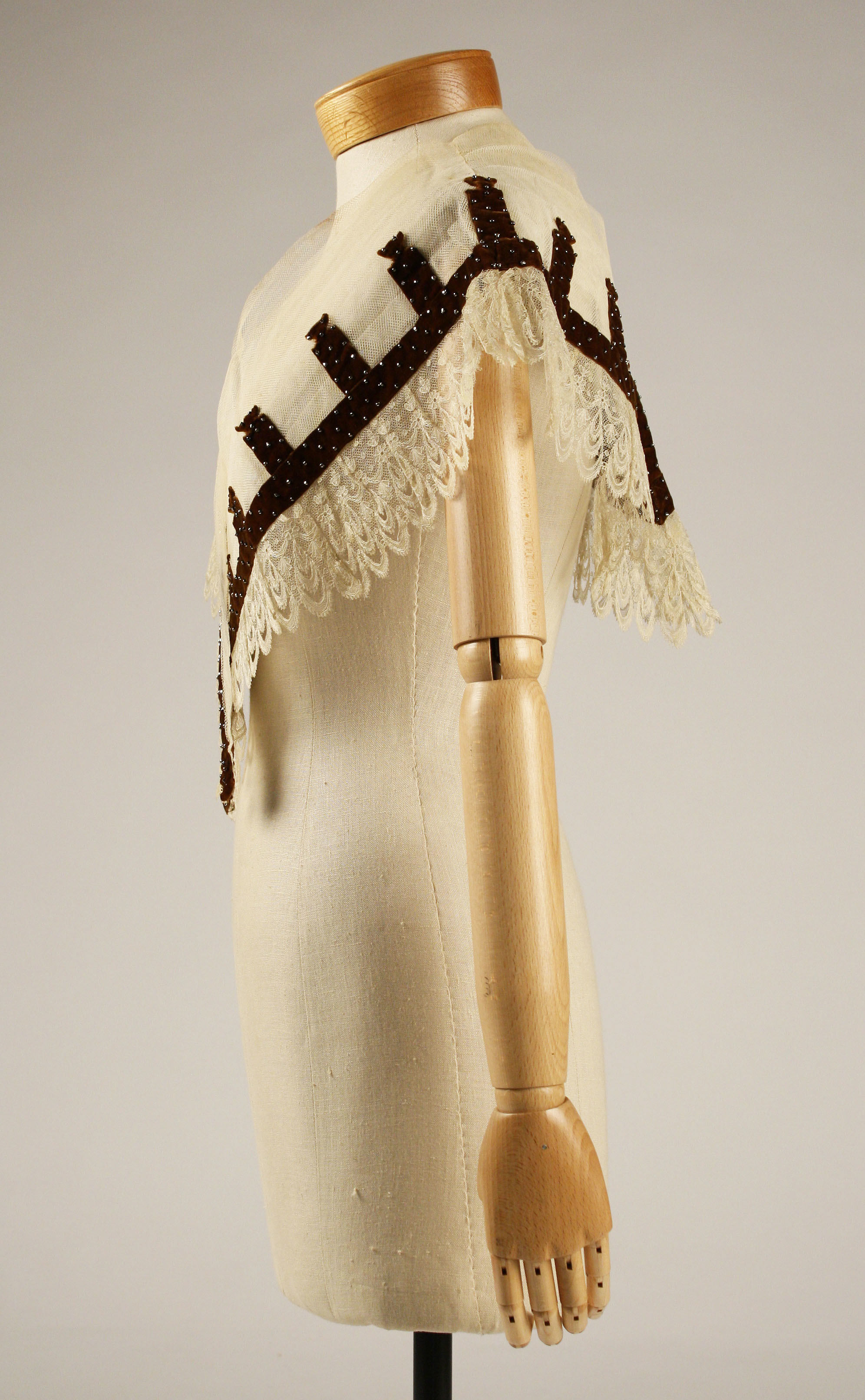
American or European, silk, mid-19th century.

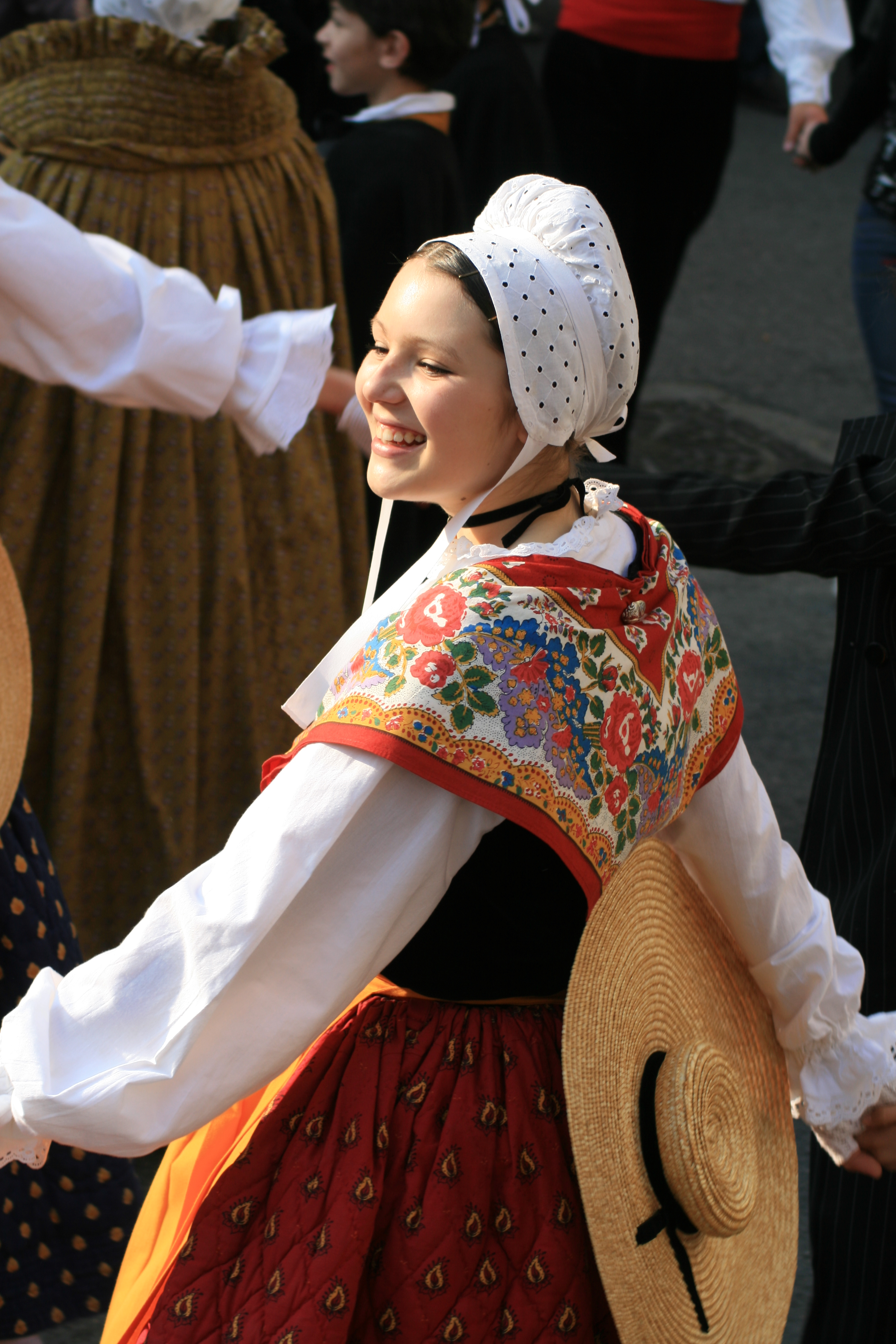
Fichu en indienne, traditionally worn in the Comtat Venaissin.

== See also ==
- 1700–1750 in fashion
- 1750–1795 in fashion
- Cravat
- Kerchief
- Neckerchief
- Pañuelo

== General and cited references ==
- Baumgarten, Linda: What Clothes Reveal: The Language of Clothing in Colonial and Federal America, Yale University Press, 2002. ISBN 0-300-09580-5.
- Cunnington, C. Willett, and Phillis Emily Cunnington: Handbook of English Costume in the Eighteenth Century. London: Faber, 1972.
- Payne, Blanche: History of Costume from the Ancient Egyptians to the Twentieth Century, Harper & Row, 1965. ISBN 9780060450700. LCCN 65-10419. OCLC 223437.
- Ribeiro, Aileen: Dress in Eighteenth Century Europe 1715–1789, Yale University Prison, 2002, ISBN 0-300-09151-6.
