= Fiel =

Fiel may refer to:

- Cristian Fiél (born 1980), German-Spanish football midfielder who plays for Dynamo Dresden
- Fiel van der Veen (born 1945), Dutch illustrator
- Eric E. Fiel, a general in the United States Air Force
