= VIL =

VIL and similar can refer to:

- Vertically integrated liquid, an estimate of the mass of precipitation within a cloud
- Flanders Institute for Logistics (VIL), a non-profit organization by the Flemish government
- The IATA code for Dakhla Airport

== See also ==
- Vill
- Villus
- Vile (disambiguation)
