= Pelerine =

Short cape covering the shoulders

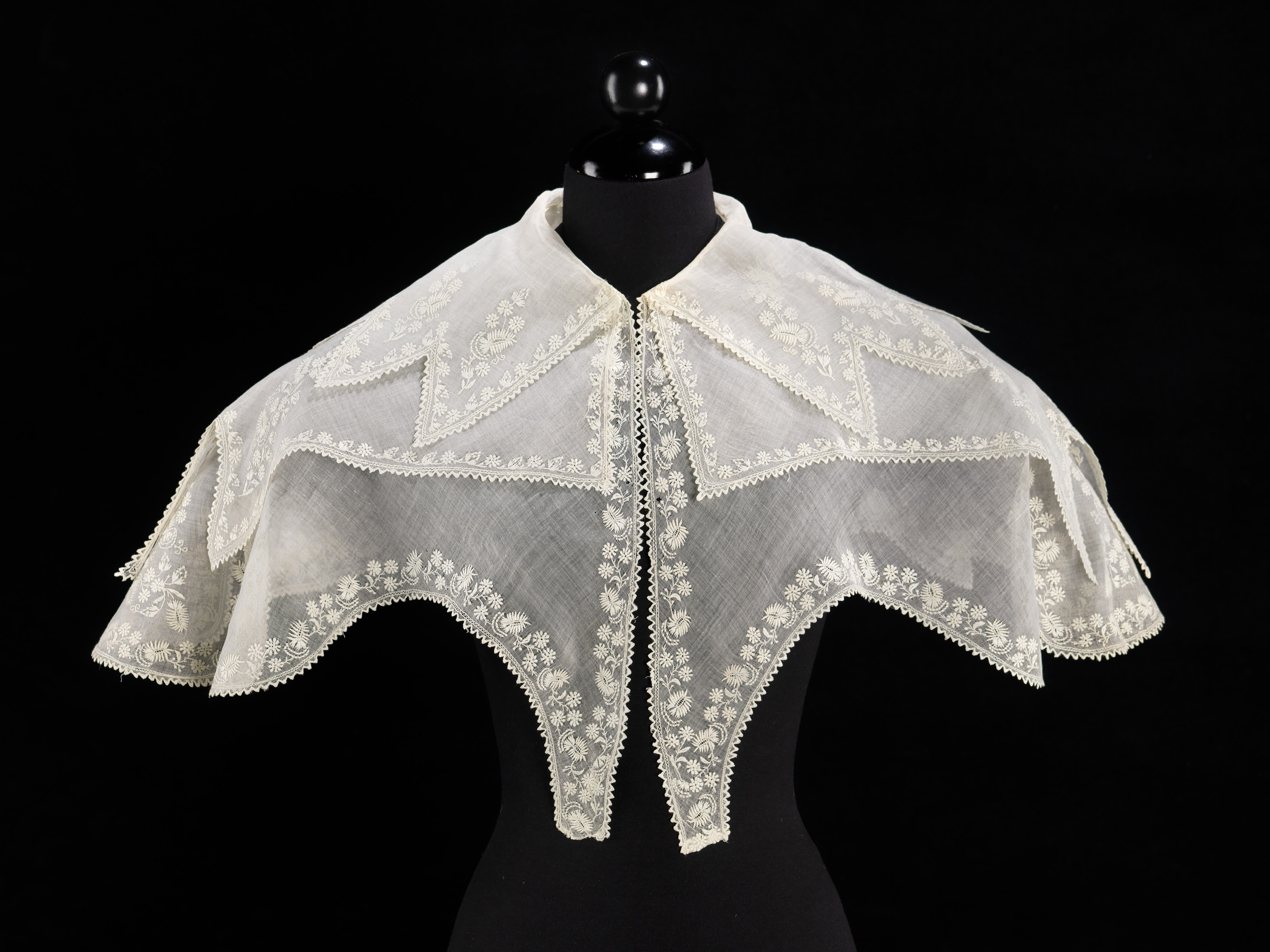
Pelerine, muslin with whitework embroidery, c.1835. The Metropolitan Museum of Art Costume Institute: 2009.300.3886.

A pelerine is a small cape-like garment that covers the shoulders, similar to a fichu. Historically, the pelerine possibly originated in a type of 15th century armor padding that protected the neck and shoulders by itself, if the padded fabric was reinforced internally with metal, and/or acted as padding between armor and the skin in the neck-to-shoulder region. The pelerine often had fasteners so that pauldrons could be attached.

In women's fashion, the pelerine was most popular during the mid- to late-nineteenth century in Europe and the Americas.

== Etymology ==
The word comes from the French "pèlerine" (female pilgrim) and is perhaps a reference to the small capes worn by many of the women in Jean-Antoine Watteau's 1717 painting Pilgrimage to Cythera.

== 19th century fashion ==
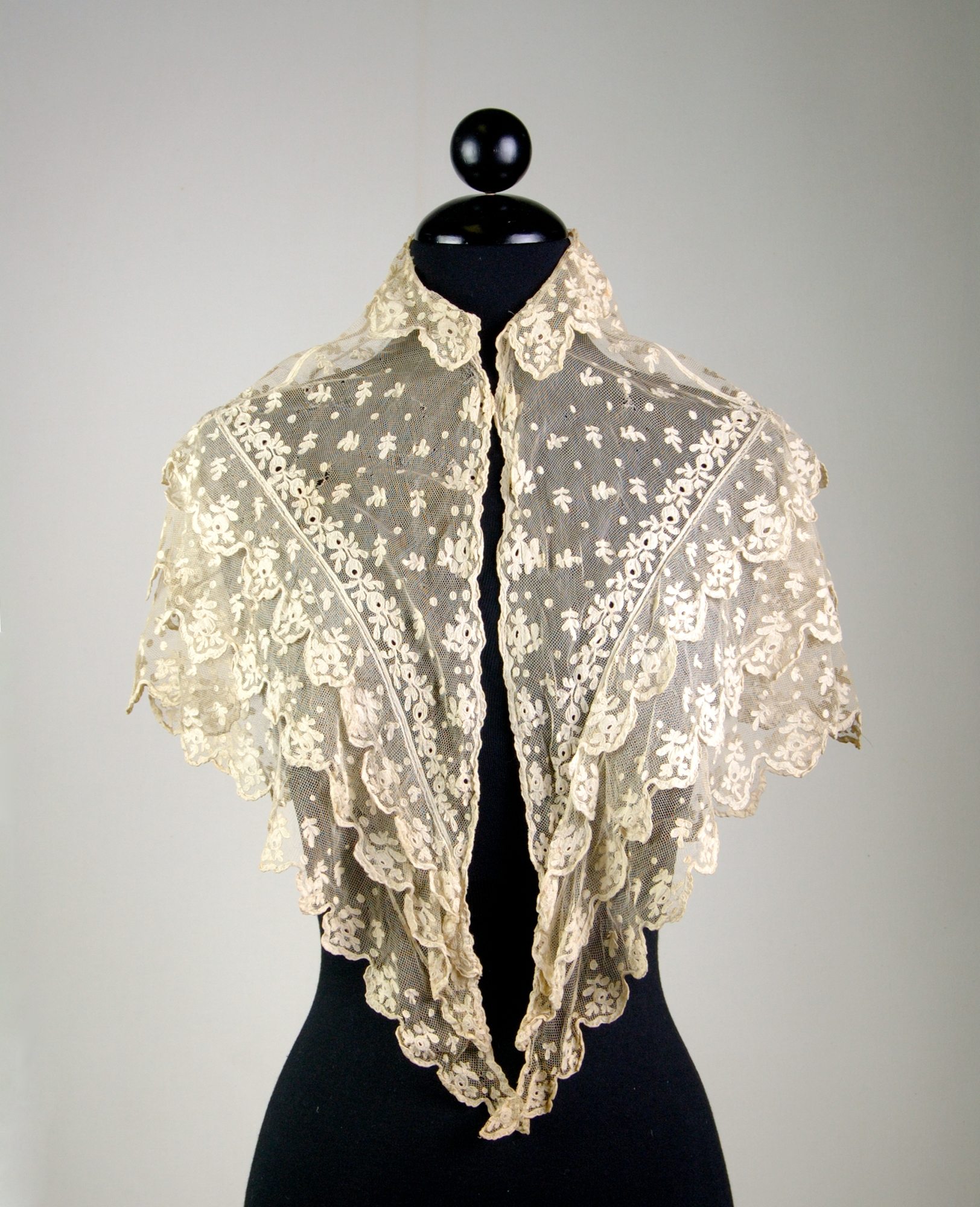
Pelerine, cotton Irish lace, c.1830-1840. The Metropolitan Museum of Art Costume Institute: 2009.300.4061.

The emergence of the pelerine in fashionable women's dress can be traced to the 18th century. At this time, the pelerine was styled as a short cape-like garment, which crossed the chest and fastened to the back of the waist.

Pelerines became particularly popular as a decorative accessory in the early 19th century, when layered muslin pelerines were deemed fashionable in the 1830s, worn draped over the top of the large gigot (or leg-of-mutton) sleeves of the period. Along with tippets, pelerines helped emphasise the fashionable width of the sleeves and the shoulderline of the 1830s. Earlier examples from the beginning of the century to about 1825 were more akin to large lace collars, whereas pelerines from the 1830s were similarly styled as those of the previous century, though serving more as a decorative piece than any practical purpose.

Pelerines could be made of various materials, including muslin, silk, lace, or cottons such as cambric. They could be adorned with embroidery, beadwork, ruffles, or even featherwork, and often featured shaped border edges. Crocheted pelerines were also common.

Though the wearing of pelerines continued into the early 20th century, by the late nineteenth century pelerines tended to be seen as less formal garments and were often worn at home. The term was however also used to refer to decorative high-necked lace collars, as well as short capes and mantles for practical wear outdoors.

== Gallery ==
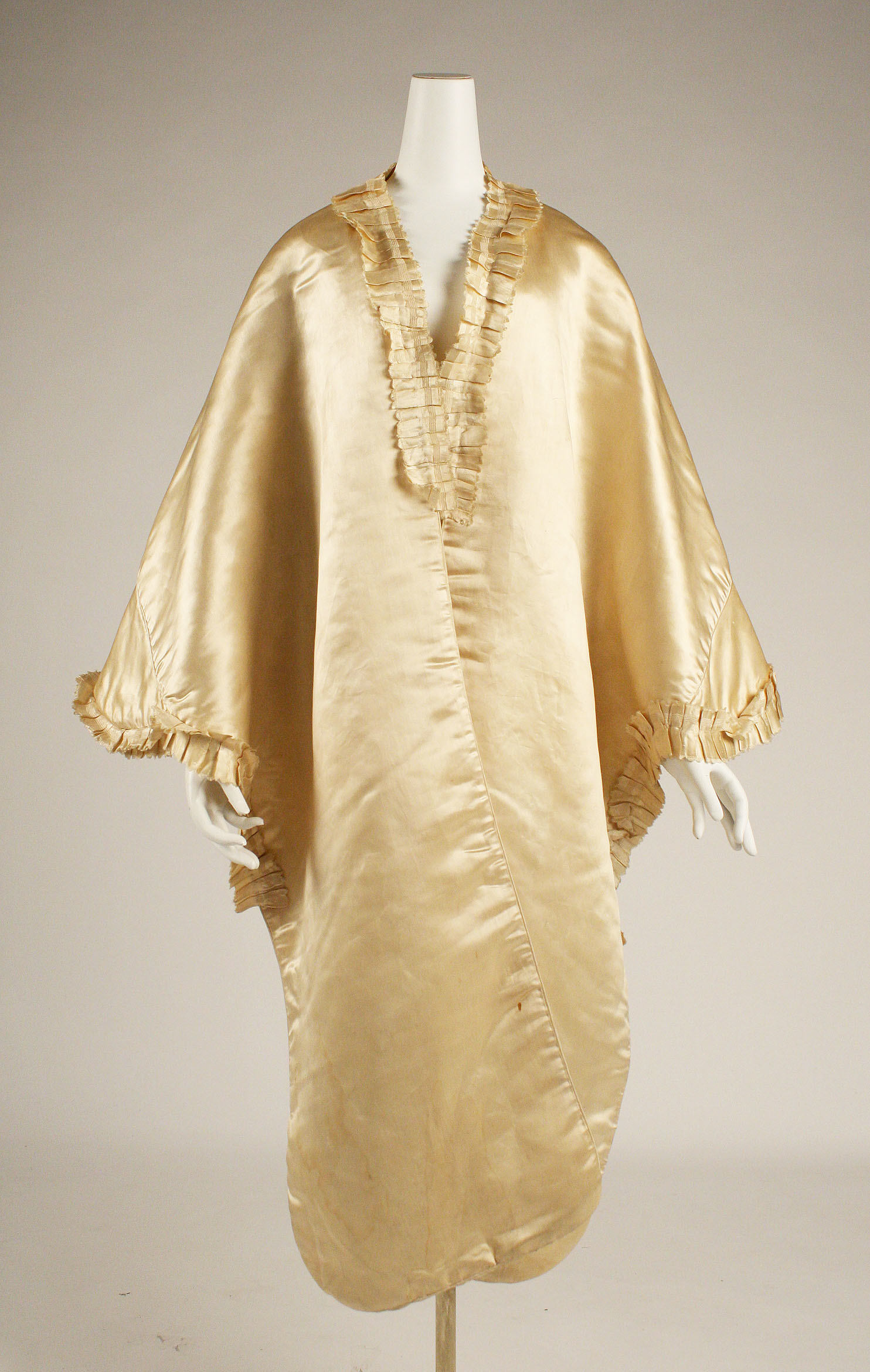
1815. Cream silk pelerine

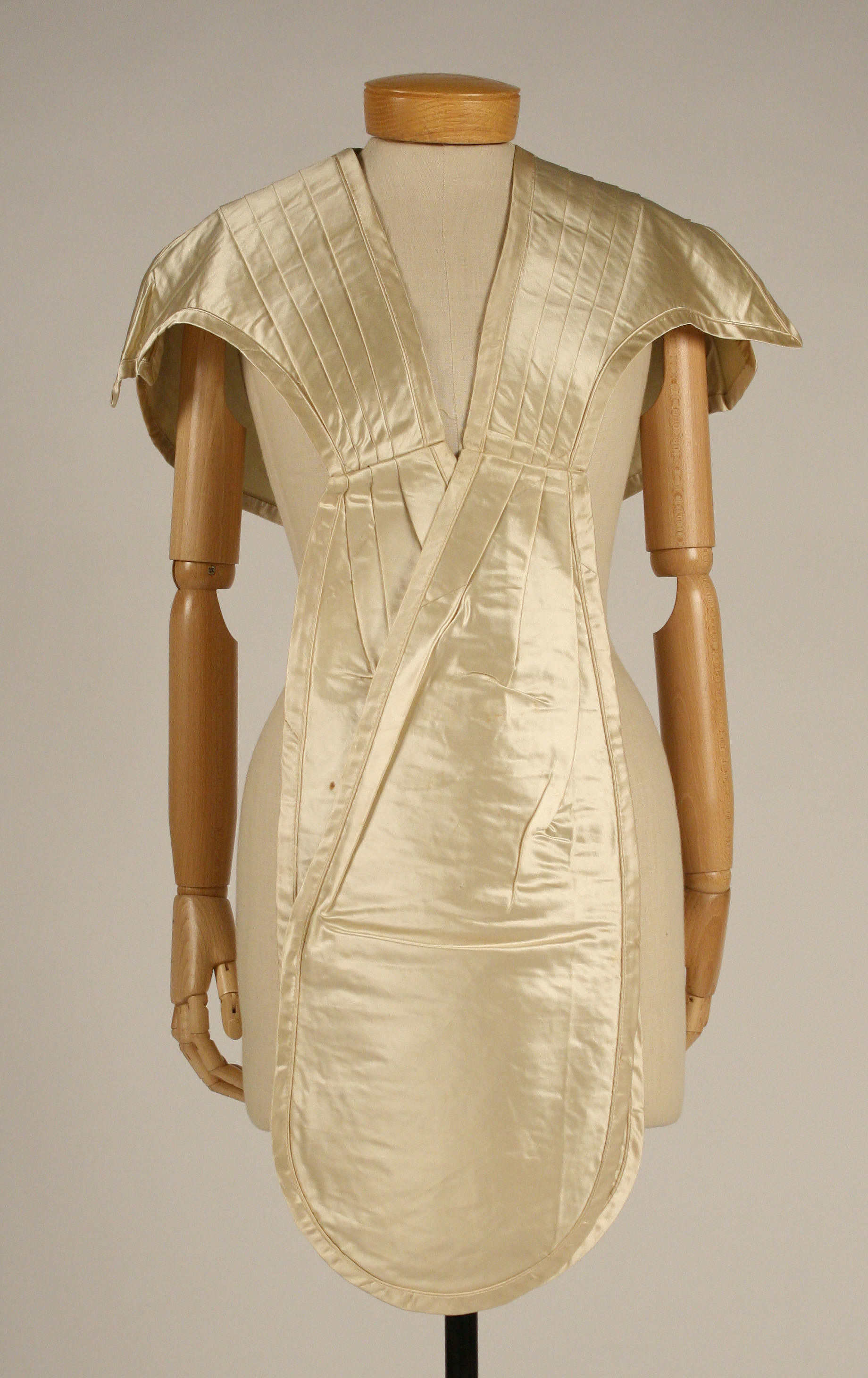
1825-30. Cream silk pelerine

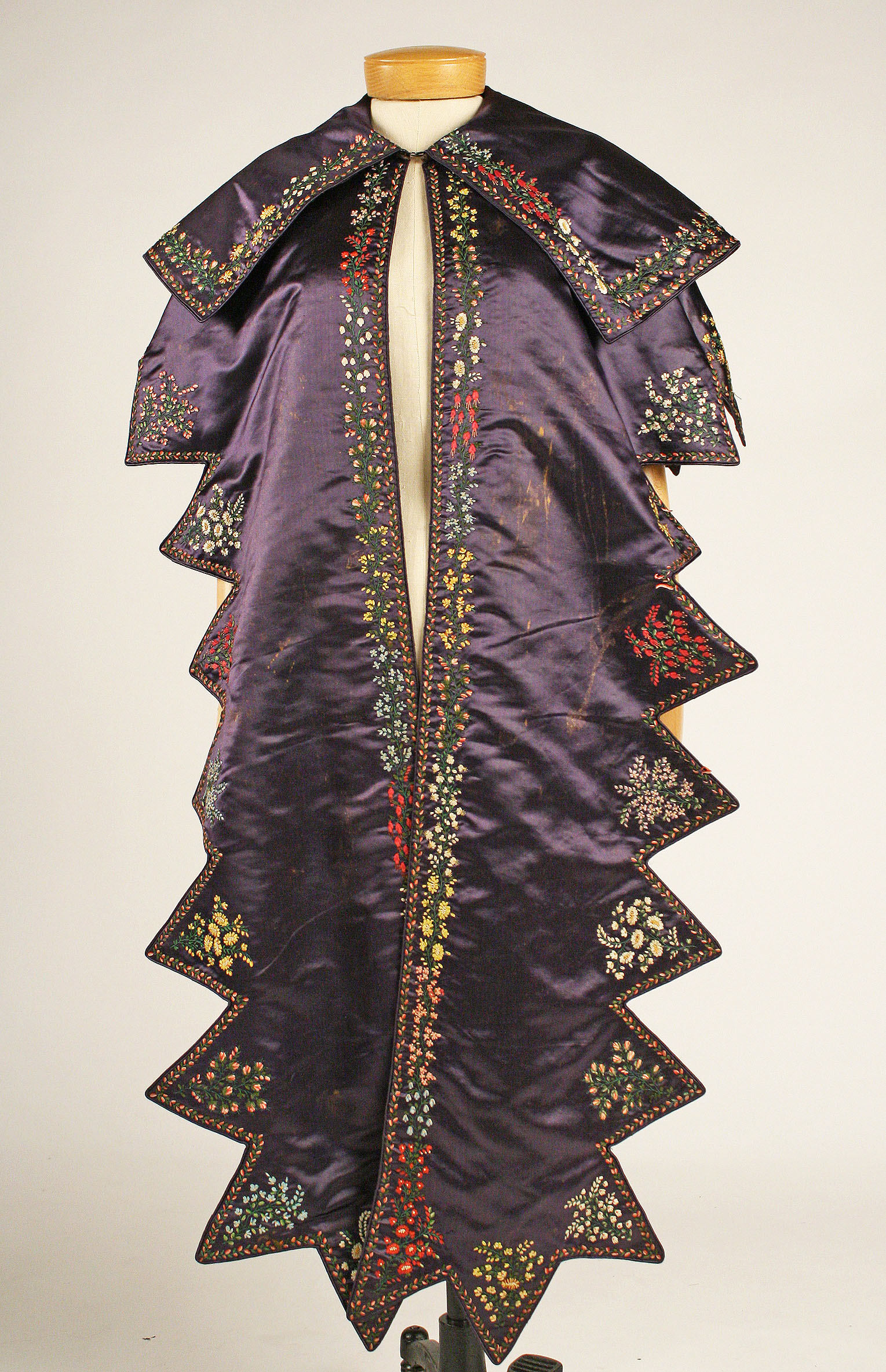
c.1830. Embroidered purple silk pelerine

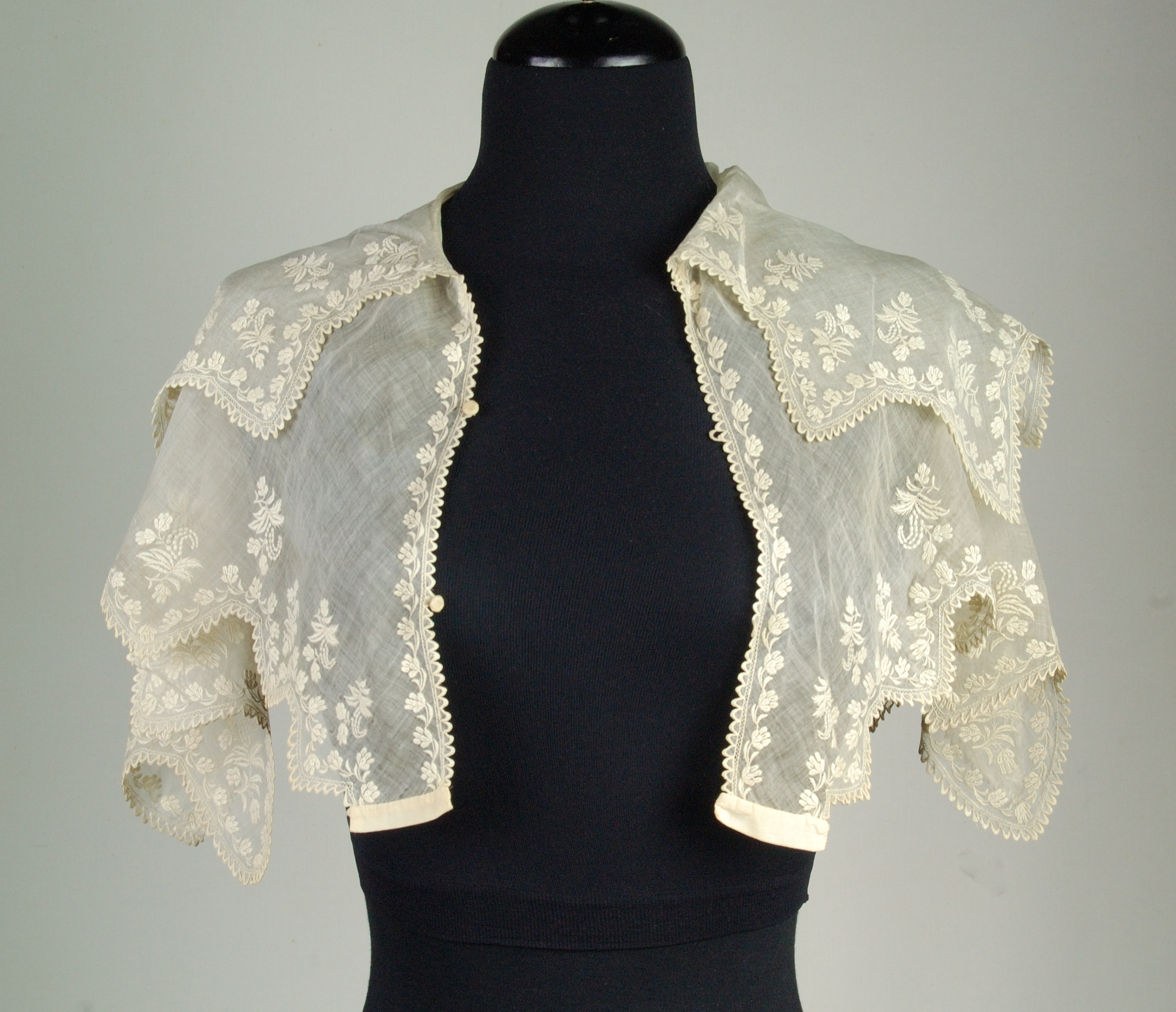
1830. Embroidered muslin pelerine, shown unfastened and unsupported

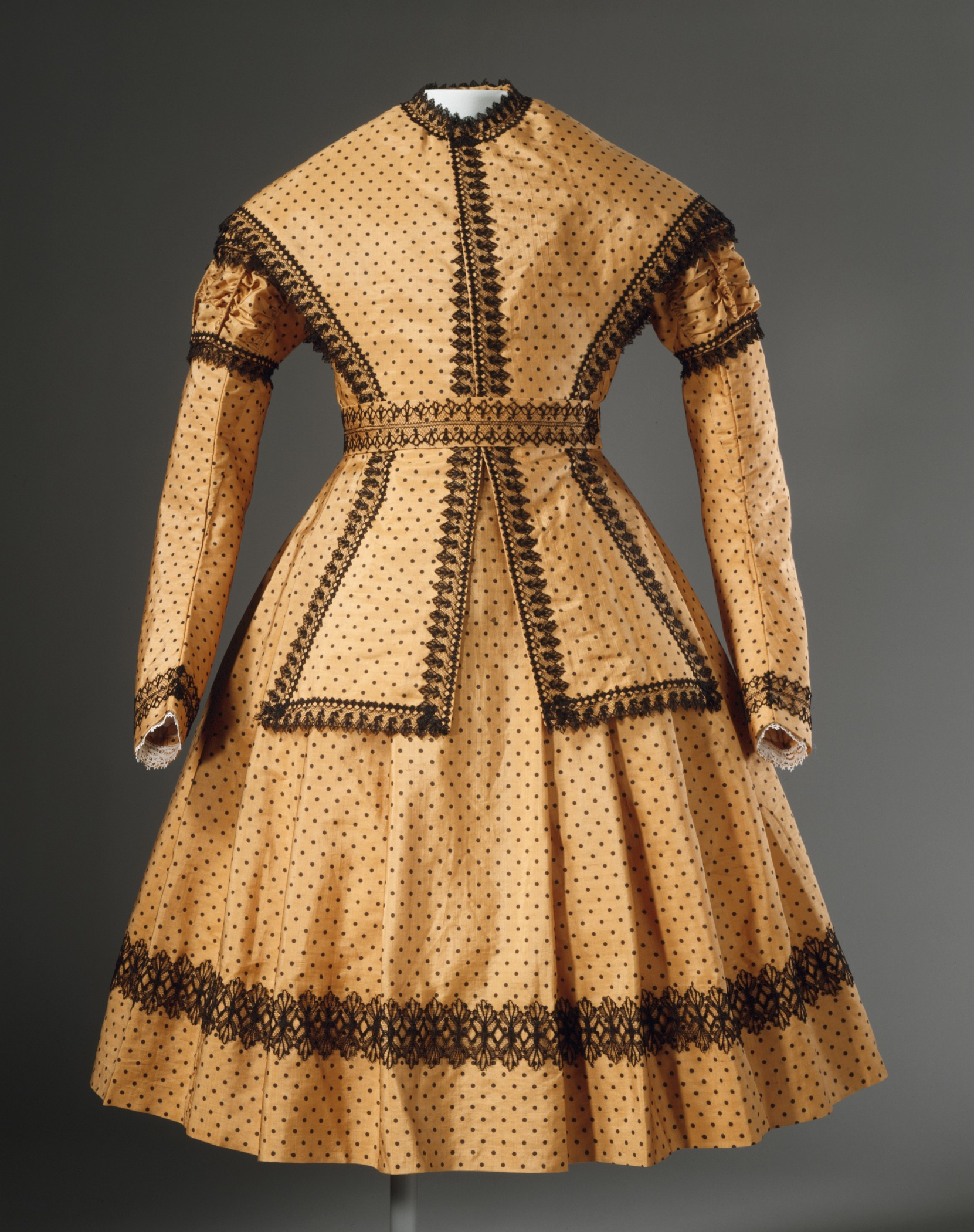
1869. Young girl's silk dress with matching pelerine and removable sleeves

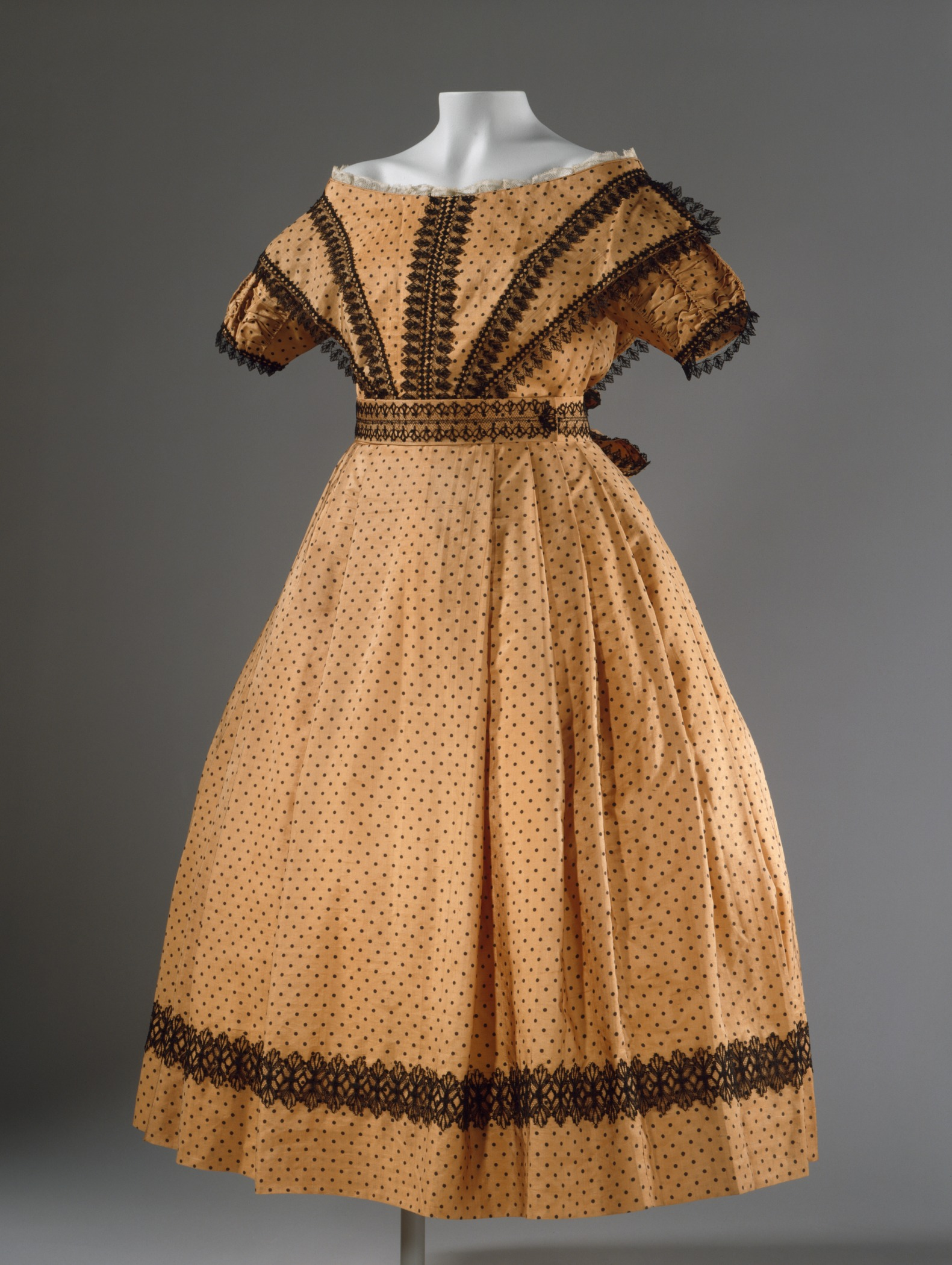
1869 The same dress without pelerine and sleeves

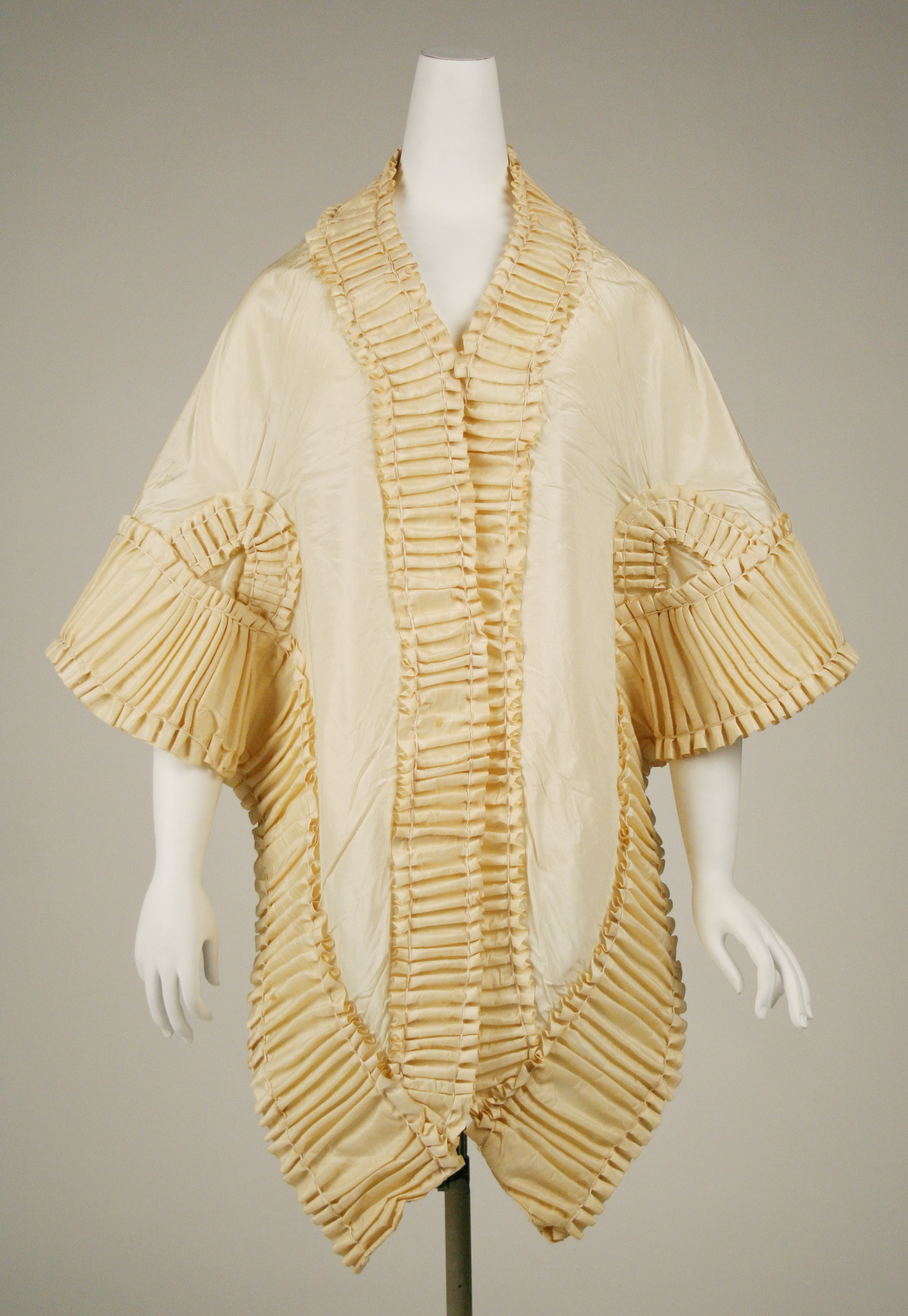
1872 Cream silk pelerine

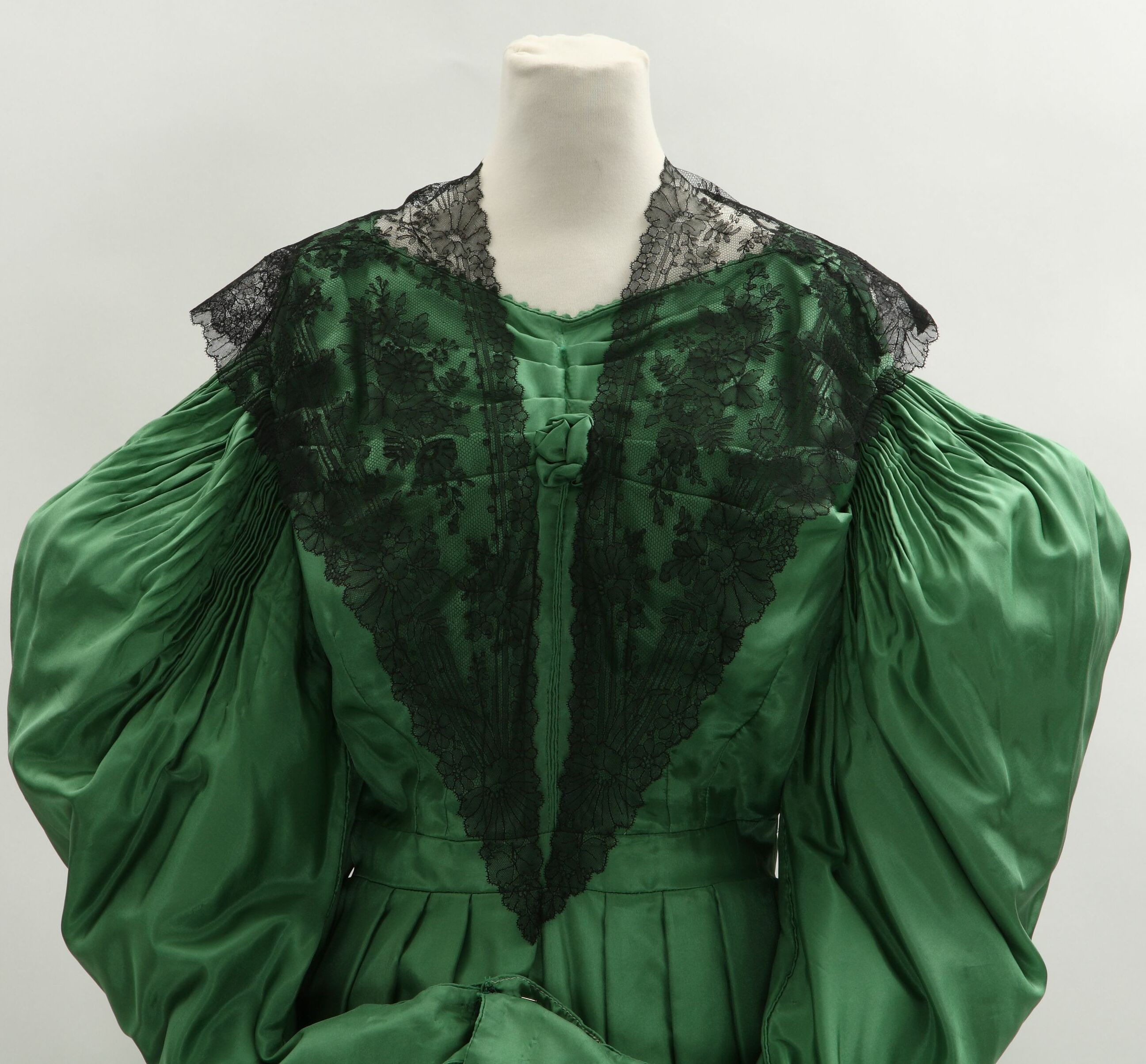
Black lace pelerine, green silk dress

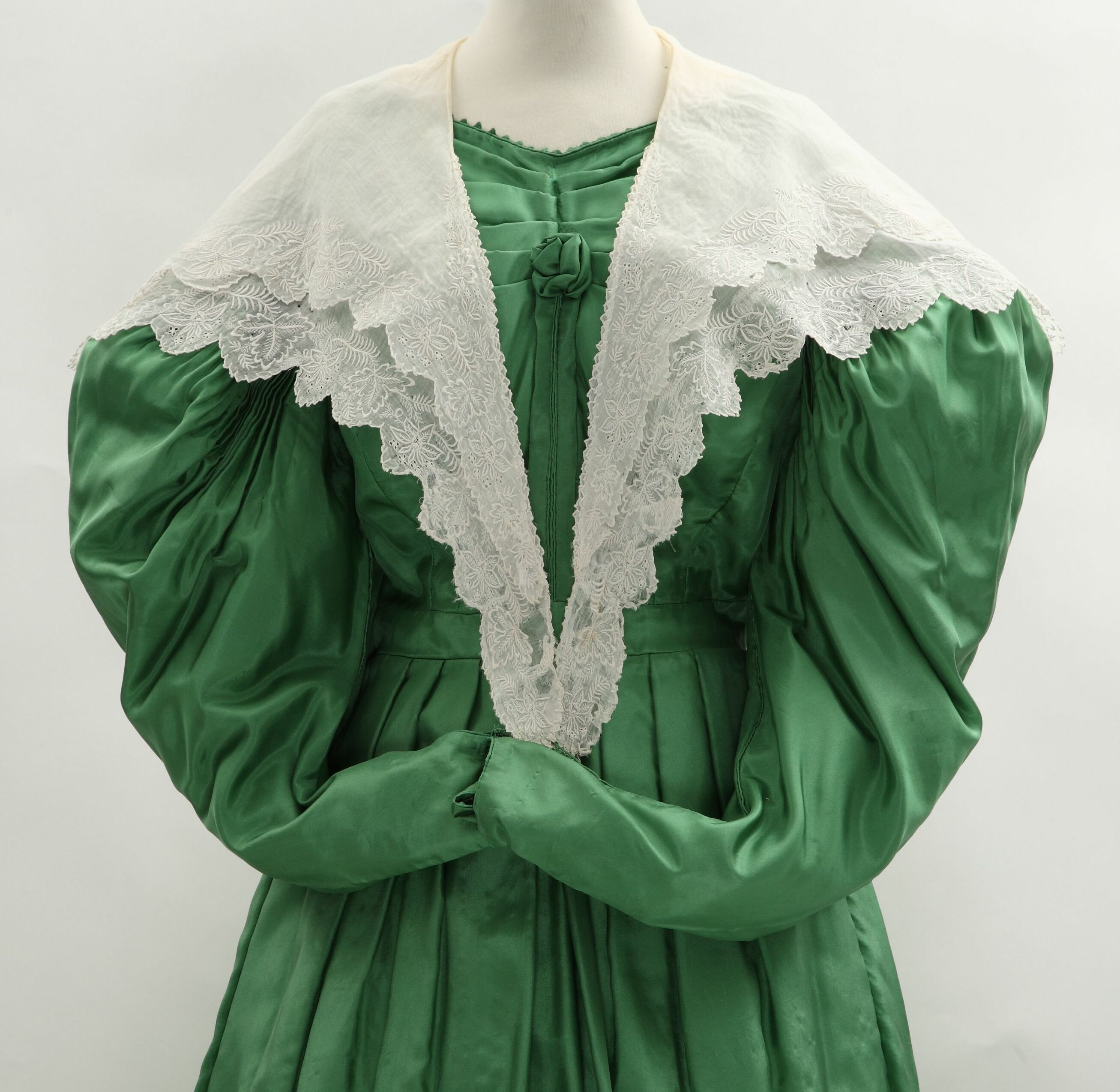
White cotton double pelerine, green silk dress

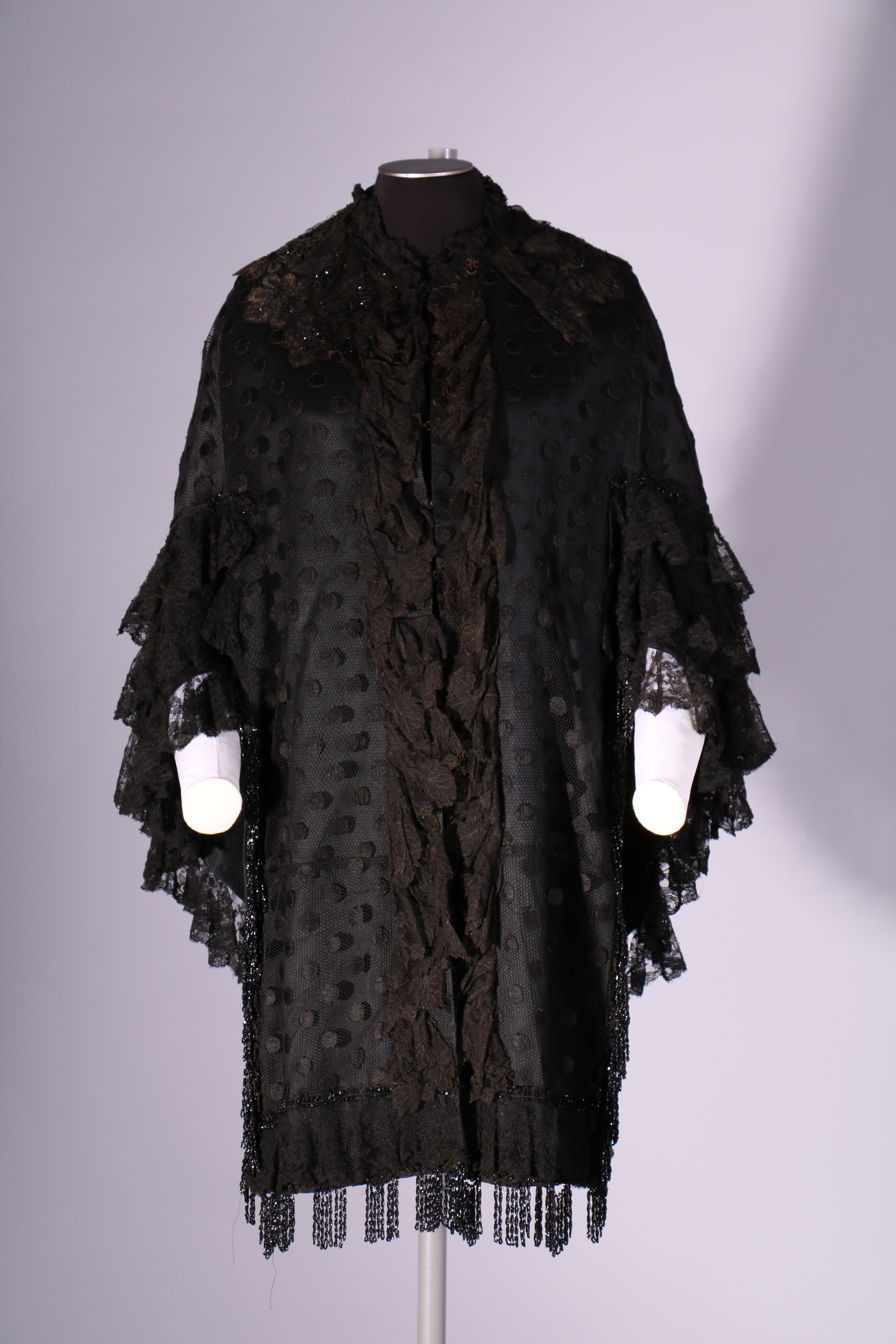
Pelerine in zwarte zijde met kantversiering, 1860-1910, MMH.2009.0314, Modemuseum Hasselt

== Related ==
- Cape
- Pellegrina
- Shawl
- Tippet
- Mantle
- Collar
