= Pfeil =

Pfeil may refer to:

== People ==
- Friedrich Wilhelm Leopold Pfeil (1783–1859), forestry scientist and founder of the Royal Prussian Higher Forestry College in Eberswalde, Germany
- Bobby Pfeil (born 1943), American right-handed Major League Baseball third baseman
- David Pfeil (born 1967), American soccer midfielder
- Fred Pfeil (1949–2005), American literary critic and novelist
- Joachim von Pfeil (1857–1924), German explorer and colonist in Africa and New Guinea
- Juliane Pfeil (born 1987), German politician
- Mark Pfeil (born 1951), American professional golfer
- Enzio von Pfeil (born 1953), German economist
- Count Jefferson von Pfeil und Klein-Ellguth (born 1967), German noble
- Valentin Pfeil (born 1988), Austrian long-distance runner

== Other ==
- Dornier Pfeil, a German aircraft from World War II, a heavy fighter
- Pfeil (schooner), from List of shipwrecks in 1929
