= Weil =

Weil may refer to:

== Places in Germany ==
- Weil, Bavaria
- Weil am Rhein, Baden-Württemberg
- Weil der Stadt, Baden-Württemberg
- Weil im Schönbuch, Baden-Württemberg

== Other uses ==
- Weil (company), a clothing factory, originally from Besançon
- Weil (river), Hesse, Germany
- Weil (surname), including people with the surname Weill, Weyl
- Doctor Weil (Mega Man Zero), a fictional character from the video game series
- Weil, Gotshal & Manges, international law firm

== See also ==
- Weill (disambiguation)
