= Mantua (disambiguation) =

Mantua is the English form of the name of the city (and, historically, also an eponymous margraviate and thereafter duchy) in Italy whose Italian name is Mantova.

Mantua may also refer to:

== Places ==
=== United States ===
- Mantua, Alabama, a hamlet in Greene County, Alabama
- Mantua, a location in Monroe County, Iowa
- Mantua, a village in Baltimore County, Maryland
- Mantua Township, New Jersey, in Gloucester County
  - Mantua Creek, a stream in the above township
- Mantua Township, Ohio, a township in Ohio adjacent to Mantua, Ohio
- Mantua, Ohio, a village in Portage County adjacent to Mantua Township, Portage County, Ohio
- Mantua, Philadelphia, Pennsylvania, a neighborhood in the West Philadelphia section
- Mantua, Utah, a town in eastern Box Elder County
- Mantua, Virginia, a census-designated place in Fairfax County

=== Elsewhere ===
- Mantua, Cuba, a municipality and city in the Pinar del Río Province
- Mantua, Nova Scotia, an unincorporated community in West Hants, Nova Scotia, Canada

== Other uses ==
- Mantua (clothing), a style of women's dress of the seventeenth and eighteenth centuries
  - Mantua (Kimberley Hall), a 17th-century complete European women's costume
- Mantua (moth), a genus of moths in the family Tortricidae
- Siege of Mantua (1796–1797), a French blockade of a large Austrian garrison during the War of the First Coalition
