= Galant style =

18th-century movement in music, arts and literature

The Galant style was an 18th-century movement in music, visual arts and literature. In Germany, a closely related style was called the empfindsamer Stil (sensitive style). Another similar style originating from France in the same century is rococo. The galant style was drawn in opposition to the strictures of the Baroque style, emphasizing light elegance in place of the Baroque's dignified seriousness and high grandeur.

== Music ==
In music, the galant emphasis was on simplicity, immediacy of appeal, and elegance.

== Fashion ==
In fashion, galant featured perfumed handkerchiefs and powdered wigs for both sexes. The striking asymmetry of bizarre silk patterns were symptomatic of galant tastes.
