= Androgyny in fashion =

Androgyny in fashion is a combination of feminine and masculine characteristics. Social standards typically restrict people's dress according to gender. Trousers were traditionally a male form of dress, frowned upon for women. However, during the 1800s, female spies were introduced, and Vivandières wore a certain uniform with a dress over trousers. Women activists during that time would also decide to wear trousers; for example, Luisa Capetillo, a women's rights activist and the first woman in Puerto Rico to wear trousers in public.

== 1760s–1790s ==
Macaroni was a term used to refer to a group of young, urban English men in the 1760s–1770s who adopted ostentatious, effeminate dress. The style Macaronis adopted was more similar to the fashions of France and Italy, "retaining pastel color, pattern and ornament, at a time when their use was being displaced by more sober dressing in England." Their gender and sexuality were often called into question and were subject to much fascination and scrutiny.

== The Victorian era (1840s–1890s) ==
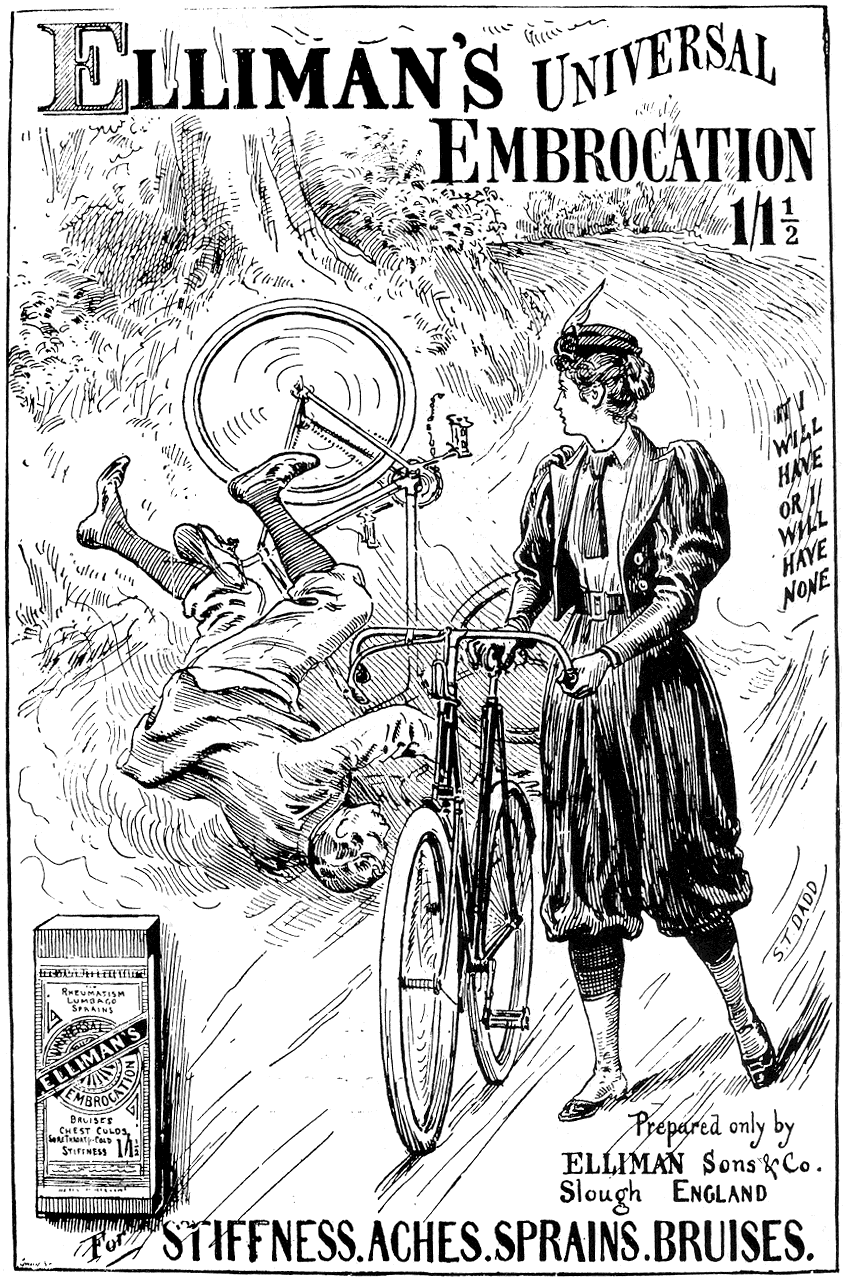
Women's cycling suit advertisement, 1897

In the Victorian era, many upper-class women adopted more masculine-styled fashion for sports. This was a source of great anxiety, as some believed this supposed "masculinization" of women would lead to "the "degeneration" of the genders". Cycling suits, for example, kept the feminine silhouette but incorporated masculine elements, like waistcoats, neckties and bifurcated skirts.

== The early 1900s ==
Androgynous dress in young children was the norm for much of the Victorian and Edwardian periods, sex differentiation in clothing was postponed until children entered school at about six or seven years old. Major fashion designers, like Paul Poiret and Coco Chanel, introduced a feminine variation of trousers to women's fashion, in line with the Flapper style for women of this era, which was considered "boyish" and gave women an androgynous look, reflecting the La Garçonne style. During the 1930s, the masculine lean of female fashion continued, with women's fashion allowing for the wearing of suits. This trend can be exemplified by celebrity Marlene Dietrich. Dietrich dressed in La Garçonne, which was a way for women to utilize modern clothing technological advancements to create a new fashion that defined femininity more on the woman's underlying shape through traditionally "masculine" clothing. Dietrich is remembered as one of the first actresses to wear trousers in a premiere.

La Garçonne became a popular androgynous fashion in the 1920s for women to adopt. Such popular women at the time like Frida Kahlo, Audrey Hepburn, and Coco Chanel were proud examples of La Garçonne fashion, exemplifying how clothes do not make someone more or less feminine, but rather the body and physiological anatomical differences beneath them.

Outside the world of high fashion, working women of this era sometimes wore masculine-style bib overalls for factory or manual labor. However, many of them kept their feminine presentation and were not impeded by their clothing, largely those working white-collar level jobs. Sportswear of the 1920s and 30s became more masculine after significant issues through the previous two decades, reflecting general trends, and following in the footsteps of previous generations.

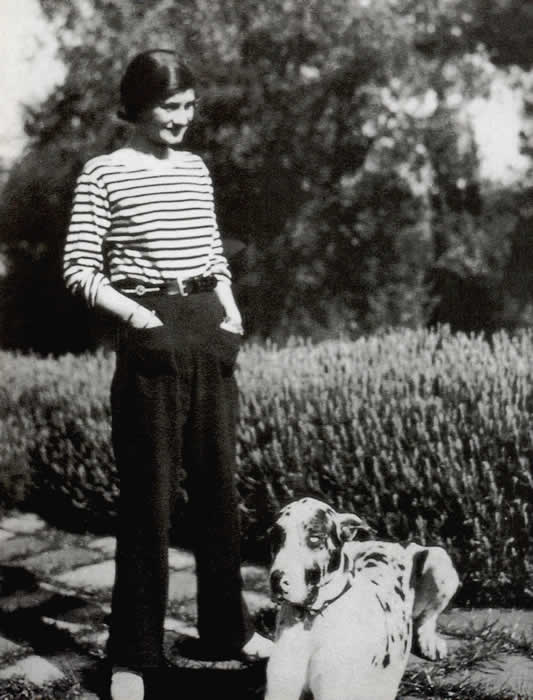
Coco Chanel wearing a sailor's jersey and trousers. 1928

Queer people of this era were often consciously gender non-conforming, for example, sailor suits were adopted by both queer men and women due to the "military exoticism and gender-blurring possibilities" becoming "a recognizable signifier of an emerging gay and bisexual identity"

== The 1950s through 1970 ==
Throughout the 1960s and 1970s, the women's liberation movement is likely to have contributed to ideas and influenced fashion designers, such as Yves Saint Laurent. Yves Saint Laurent designed the Le Smoking suit, first introduced in 1966, and Helmut Newton's eroticized androgynous photographs of it made Le Smoking iconic.

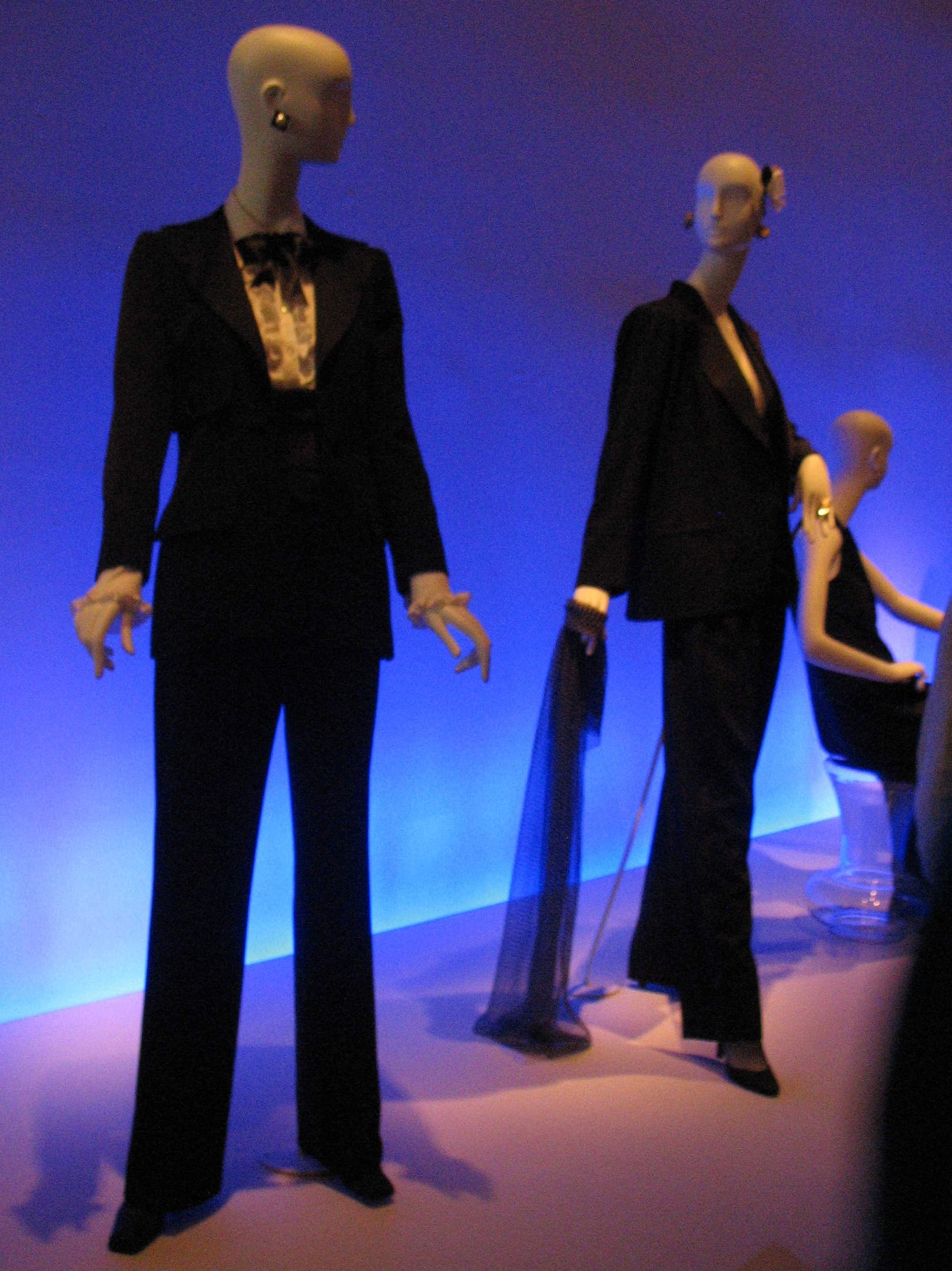
Yves Saint Laurent, the tuxedo suit "Le Smoking", created in 1966

The upsurge of androgynous dressing for men began during the 1960s and 1970s. When the Rolling Stones played London's Hyde Park in 1969, Mick Jagger wore a white 'man's dress' by British designer Mr Fish. Mr Fish, also known as Michael Fish, was the most fashionable shirt-maker in London, the inventor of 'the Kipper tie,' and a principal taste-maker of the peacock revolution in men's fashion. His creation for Mick Jagger was considered to be the epitome of the Swinging Sixties. During this period, the androgynous style was also adopted by celebrities like Jimi Hendrix, who often wore high heels and blouses.

During the 1970s, David Bowie presented his alter ego Ziggy Stardust, a character that was a symbol of sexual ambiguity, when he launched the album 'The Rise and Fall of Ziggy Stardust and Spiders from Mars'. This was when androgyny entered the mainstream in the 1970s and had a big influence on pop culture. Another significant influence during this time included John Travolta, one of the androgynous male heroes of the post-counter-culture disco era, who starred in Grease and Saturday Night Fever.

== The 1980s ==
Continuing into the 1980s, the rise of avant-garde fashion designers like Yohji Yamamoto challenged the social constructs around gender. They reinvigorated androgyny in fashion, addressing gender issues. This was also reflected in pop culture icons during the 1980s, such as David Bowie and Annie Lennox.

Power dressing for women became even more prominent within the 1980s which was previously only something done by men in order to look structured and powerful. However, during the 1980s this began to take a turn as women were entering jobs with equal roles to men. In the article "The Menswear Phenomenon" by Kathleen Beckett written for Vogue in 1984 the concept of power dressing is explored as women entered these jobs they had no choice but to tailor their wardrobes accordingly, eventually leading the ascension of power dressing as a popular style for women. Ostensibly this demonstrated women's desire to be seen and valued for their mental abilities rather than their physical appearance. The complexity of 1980s power dressing, however, is reflected in film with movies like "Working Girl" where power-dressing is central to the plot, but even so, the heroine is portrayed as having softer and gentler style than her villainous boss.

Androgynous fashion made its most powerful debut of the 1980s through the work of Yohji Yamamoto and Rei Kawakubo, who brought in a distinct Japanese style that adopted a distinctively gender ambiguous theme. These two designers consider themselves to be very much a part of the avant-garde, reinvigorating Japanism. They followed a more anti-fashion approach, deconstructing garments in order to move away from the more mundane aspects of Western fashion of the time. This led to more gender-friendly garment construction in Western fashion in the 1980s. Designers like Yamamoto believe that the idea of androgyny should be celebrated, as it is an unbiased way for an individual to identify with one's self, and that fashion is purely a catalyst for this.

Also during the 1980s, Grace Jones, a famous singer and fashion model, startled the public with her gender-thwarted appearance. Her androgynous style derivative of power dressing and her eccentric personality inspired many. She has become an androgynous style icon for modern celebrities. This was controversial, but led to a rise of unisex designers in the 1990s, and the androgynous style was widely adopted by many.

== After 2000 ==
In 2016, Louis Vuitton revealed that Jaden Smith would star in their womenswear campaign. Because of events like this, gender fluidity in fashion has been discussed in the media regarding Lady Gaga, Ruby Rose, and in Tom Hooper's film The Danish Girl. Jaden Smith has inspired the movement with his appeal for clothes to be non-gender specific, meaning that men can wear skirts and women can wear boxer shorts if they so wish.

Gen Z has been a large force in the androgyny movement specifically in the alternative crowd. For instance, Billie Eilish's over-sized and blocky clothing has been seen as inspirational example of androgynous clothing among nonbinary teens. However, the movement isn't only limited to blocky outfits of pop stars that create an absence of gender; it can also be used in a boastful manner. Colombian-American photographer Ruven Afandor has also been credited with pushing the border of androgyny by presenting a photo album of young flat-chested men in usually feminine outfits.

Androgynous fashion has also been seen in Asia, with the danso, women-to-men crossdressing, and jendaresu (genderless dressing) movements in Japan. The Memoirs of the Future collection being shown in Manila by Filipino fashion designer Ellis Co presents a cohesive set of 44 different dark and blocky gender-ambiguous outfits. The outfits usually feature dark oversized jackets and feature each of the models with black painted nails.

During the mid-2010s androgynous and genderqueer underwear also began a new transformation. Gender-queer underwear brands, like Urbody, began making gender-neutral and gender-equal underwear for queer people by going against the trends of the common hyper-gendered clothing lines.

In 2021, a smaller multi-brand retailer Slowco adopted gender-neutral categories and designs. They swapped their womenswear and menswear labels for 'femme', 'masc', and 'all'. This swap allows individuals to shop according to their expression without having to identify a gender identity.

Androgynous clothing, characterized by its unisex or gender-neutral design, allows individuals to create a unique personal style. This fashion choice does not define one's femininity, masculinity, or desirability but rather serves as a powerful expression of individuality and confidence. Embracing androgynous fashion is about feeling comfortable and authentic in one's own skin, and recognizing that femininity and masculinity come in many forms.

== See also ==
- Unisex clothing
