= Sharpe Suiting =

American clothing company

- Type: Private
- Industry: Manufacturing, Fashion
- Genre: Genderqueer fashion
- Founded: 2013; 13 years ago in Los Angeles, California
- Founder: Leon Elias Wu
- Fate: Active
- Headquarters: Los Angeles, CA, United States
- Number of locations: 5 (2020)
- Area served: Worldwide
- Key people: Leon Wu (Founder and CEO); Antonio Soto (Creative Director); Marcia Alvarado (Director of Marketing)
- Products: Tailored suits, Formal wear
- Number of employees: 10-50 (2020)
- Website: sharpesuiting.com

Sharpe Suiting is an American designer, producer and manufacturer of garments based in Los Angeles, California. The company was founded in 2013, in Los Angeles, by Leon Elias Wu, who is the current CEO of the company. Sharpe suiting is a public-benefit corporation recognized for gender neutral clothing and genderqueer fashion.

== History ==
=== 2009–2014 ===
In 2009, while traveling abroad to China during business school, Leon Wu, a transgender man from Los Angeles, conceptualized a company that focused on formal wear designs for butch lesbians and trans men. He founded Sharpe Suiting in 2013. Initially, Sharpe Suiting was incorporated as a custom tailor for bespoke and made-to-measure suits which were designed for feminine bodies. In his 2015 interview with HuffPost, Wu said that he felt that "[bridging] the gap between male and female clothing is going to have a large social impact in that it defines the acceptance of queer identities, as well as advancing gender equality in the larger straight community".

Wu launched a Kickstarter campaign for a ready-to-wear line of genderqueer clothing in October 2014. The clothing line was based on a trademarked system called Andropometrics. The Andropometrics is a term coined by Wu. The concept of Andropometrics is based on the body measurements and metrics taken from over 250 of his clients, both male and female. The resulting measurements were used to create suits which fit people of all sizes and genders. The Kickstarter campaign raised over $69,387 in funding by the start of 2015.

=== 2015–2019 ===
In 2015, Sharpe Suiting designed a custom suit for Claudetteia Love, then-seventeen, after she successfully contested her school's policy against allowing women to wear suits to prom. Sharpe Suiting partnered with fashion designer Nik Kacy to launch "Love Fellowship", which offered free bespoke prom attire and footwear to help students express their gender identities at prom.

From 2015 to 2017, Sharpe Suiting experienced significant growth in its revenue. Between 2018 and 2019, the company increased their revenue by 240%. By the end of 2019, the Sharpe Suiting experienced 175% of growth in company's revenue.

The company's customer base includes members of the LGBT community as well as allies. As of June 2020, Sharpe Suiting had locations in Los Angeles, Chicago, Tampa, Florida, Charlotte, North Carolina, and Houston. The company has been modeled at queer fashion shows such as Queer Fashion Week in Oakland, California and Dapper Q's 1st, 3rd and 6th Annual runway at the Brooklyn Museum during the 2014, 2016 and 2019 New York Fashion Weeks. Sharpe Suiting has been a part of Los Angeles Fashion Week catwalks since 2014.

== Operations ==
Leon Wu is the current CEO of Sharpe Suiting and Maria Alvarado is the company's Director of Marketing. Antonio Soto is the Lead Designer and Creative Director at the company. Sharpe Suiting is a public-benefit corporation with specific focus on the benefits to support LGBTQ community, women and people of color through charitable channels. The corporate culture at the company has been featured in media worldwide including Huffington Post, LA Times, Wall Street Journal, The New York Times, etc. The designs by Sharpe Suiting have made appearances at public events including The Oscars, Emmys and Cannes Film Festivals. In late 2016, the company moved from Los Angeles Fashion District to their current location in Hollywood on Sunset Boulevard.

== See also ==
- LGBT-owned business
