= Queer fashion =

Style convention

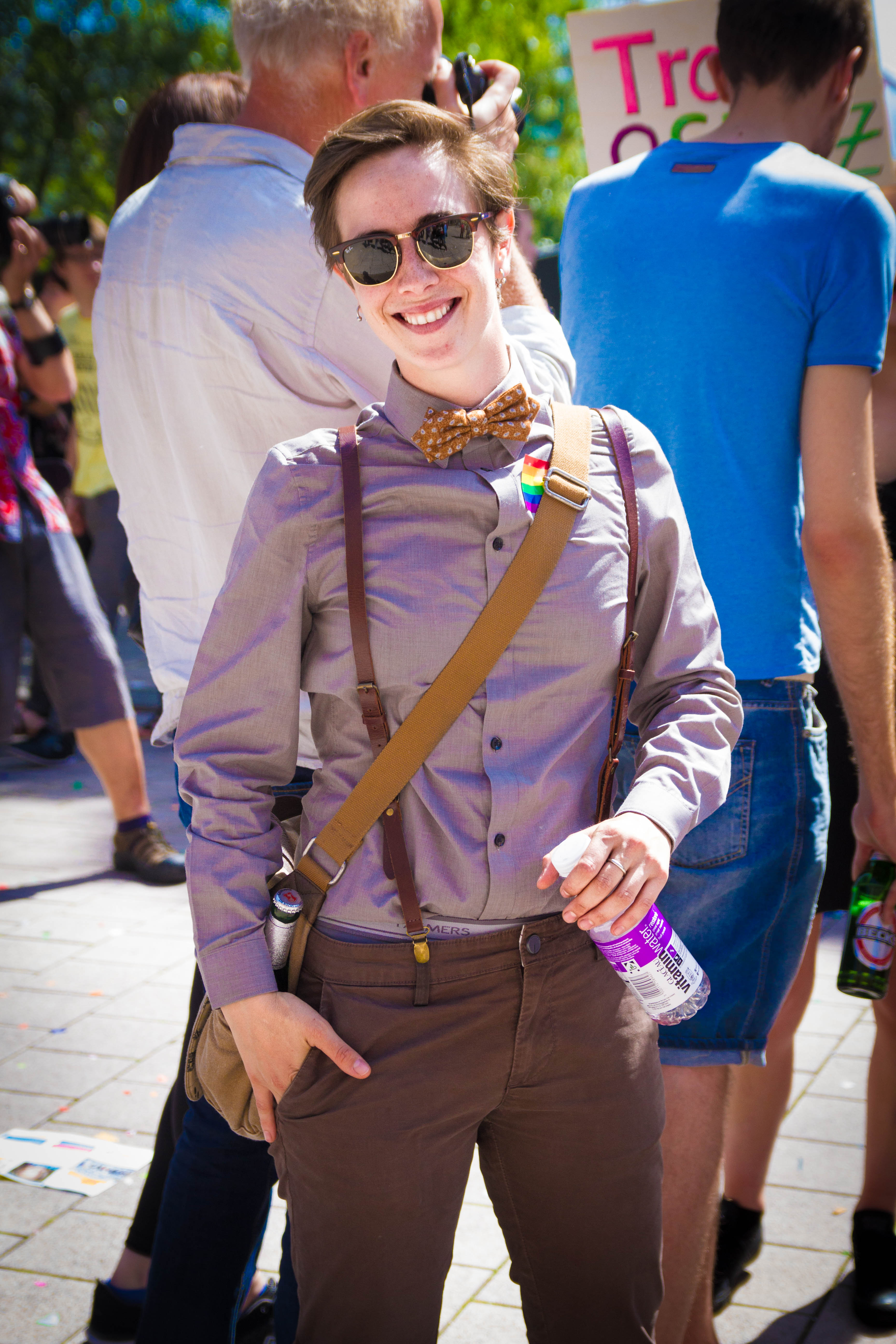
Queer fashion style

Queer fashion is fashion among queer and nonbinary people that goes beyond common style conventions that usually associate certain shapes and colors with one of the two binary genders.

Queer fashion aims to be perceived by consumers as a fashion style that focuses on experimenting garments based on people's different body shapes instead of following the restrictions given by gendered clothing categorization.

== Queer style ==
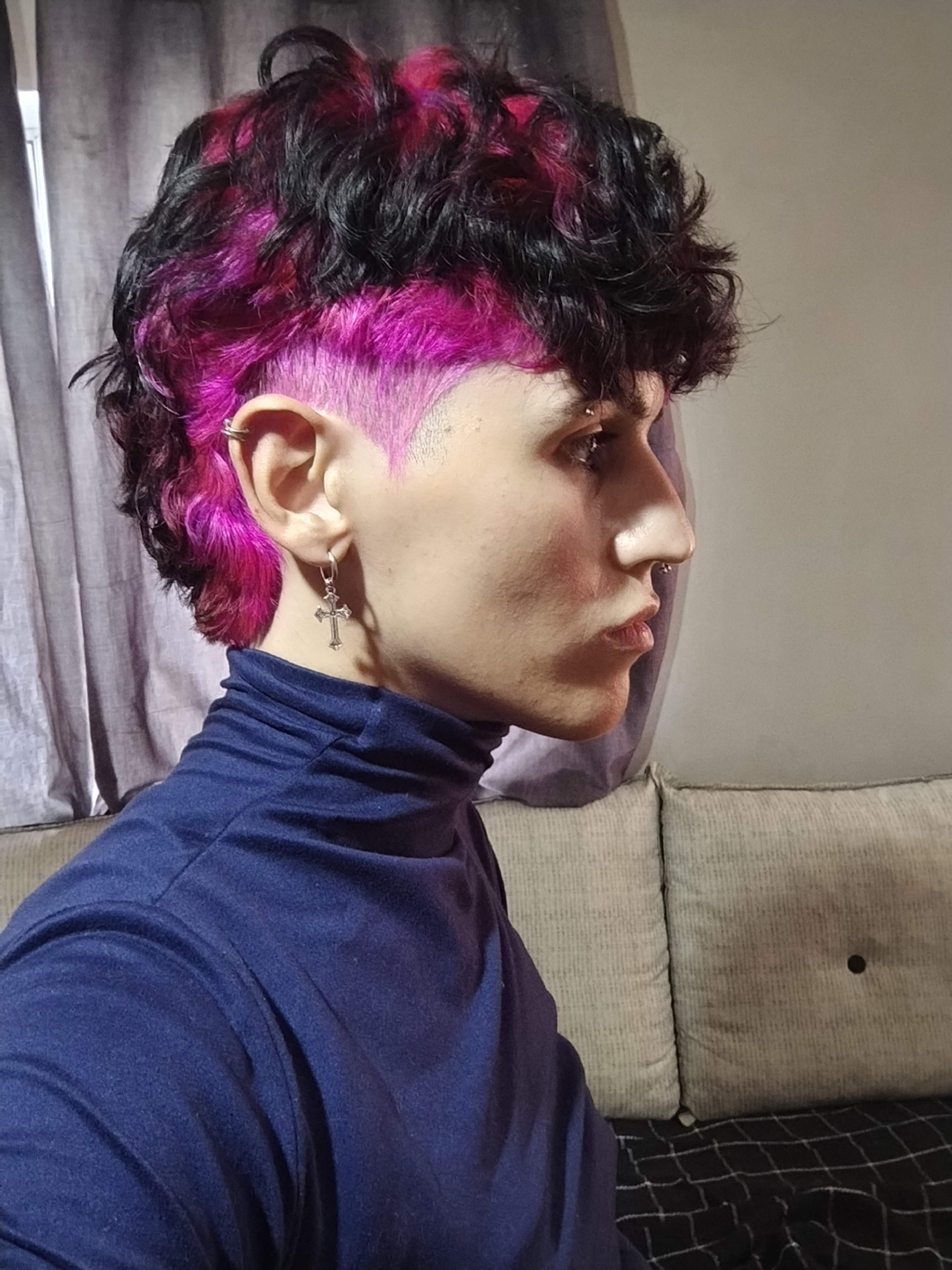
A non-binary person with pink ghost roots and a modern mullet.

Queer style is the expression of an identity that does not conform to typical cultural and societal norms of gender through the expression of fashion, typically through the combination of (though not always) clothing and accessories originally designed for men and/or women. Though the impetus behind expressing a queer or nonbinary identity through fashion is typically only the desire for self-expression, it may be seen as a political act in the society and culture in which the queer person exists.

The differentiation between gender norms through clothing came into more prominence and importance during the 19th century, mainly through the use of different fabrics, trims and constructions for different genders. These distinctions were meant to mirror gender roles in society as masculine clothing aimed to be practical while female fashion was perceived as purely aesthetic. Despite the entrenchment of links between fashion and gender identity, gender expression today is recognized by the LGBTQ community as a very personal and subjective behaviour; Queer style is therefore intrinsically tied to identity, and as such, includes a vast range of aesthetics. This expression of gender through fashion is seen as a fundamental aspect of both self-realisation and presentation, with changes in clothing often playing a key role in this realisation.

However, the presentation of a nonbinary or queer identity through fashion often presents problems in societies wherein clothing is produced in a heavily gendered way, which often in turn reflect that society's interpretation of gender identity, meaning that the expression of a Queer identity is often politicised and restricted. In an article featuring gender non-conforming writer and performance artist Alok Vaid-Menon, Vaid-Menon posited that fashion represented the inherent politics of a person, with queer and transgender people, whose existence is often politicised, being especially aware of this, particularly for people assigned male at birth, for whom the act of presenting femininely, through wearing dresses and makeup, is likely to attract unwanted attention.

There's a material consequence to me presenting feminine, and there's not a material consequence to me presenting masculine, the minute I wear lipstick, or the minute I put on earrings, or the minute I'm wearing a skirt, my entire reality shifts.

The heightened aspect of risk for nonbinary people assigned male at birth presenting their identity through fashion was emphasized in 2017 study from Davidson Skylar, showing that non-binary people assigned male at birth encountered more negative employment outcomes than non-binary people who were assigned female at birth, a phenomenon considered to be an aspect of transmisogyny.

== Emerging designers ==
Most mainstream stores separate man and women clothing in different sections, making it difficult for Queer people to find clothes that fit. Queer designers are trying to build a bridge between menswear and womenswear by meeting the clothing needs of all identities. For example, the clothing brand NO SESSO specializes in using different prints, fabric and reconstructed materials to dress various body types and gender identities.

Sharpe Suiting is a fashion line that through a Kickstarter campaign was able to manufacture custom-constructed dresswear and a ready-to-wear line for a niche of masculine and androgynous people. Its innovative feature consists in developing a system of measuring and tailoring techniques that minimize female curves of people who don't identify as women. This method is called andropometrics and is an androgynous alternative to the standard anthropometrics method used by most manufacturers.

Maternity lines often include stereotypically feminine elements both in shapes and patterns, as motherhood and femininity are commonly considered to be matching. An alternative was offered by the startup company butchbaby & co, the first wear line for pregnant Queer individuals.

== Global retail brands ==
Non-conforming fashion styles are gaining acceptance by a larger audience; for this reason, brands such as Zara and H&M are trying to offer unisex clothing lines to consumers by launching gender neutral collections.

These collections are represented by female or male models only. Also, these unisex products display an aesthetic typically considered masculine, both in shapes and colours (grey, beige and brown).

Other brands, such as Transform Transwear, break the fashion binary by offering styles and cuts of clothing for differing body shapes, rather than following the industry norm of 'male' and 'female' shapes and designs.

== Designers ==
Queer fashion is being increasingly recognized by designers who are now showcasing it on their runaways. For example, during Moschino's Fall 2018 menswear and women's Pre-Fall show, Jeremy Scott presented a gender non-conforming look modelled by nonbinary model Oslo Grace and queer drag queen Violet Chachki. In Violet Chachki's words: "It's very important to have visual representation, to show that Queers are important, Queers are powerful, Queers are beautiful, Queers are valid, and you can't erase us".

Moreover, modeling agencies are starting to scout non-binary models. This is the case of My Friend Ned; a South African agency that officially divides its models in male, female and non-binary sections.

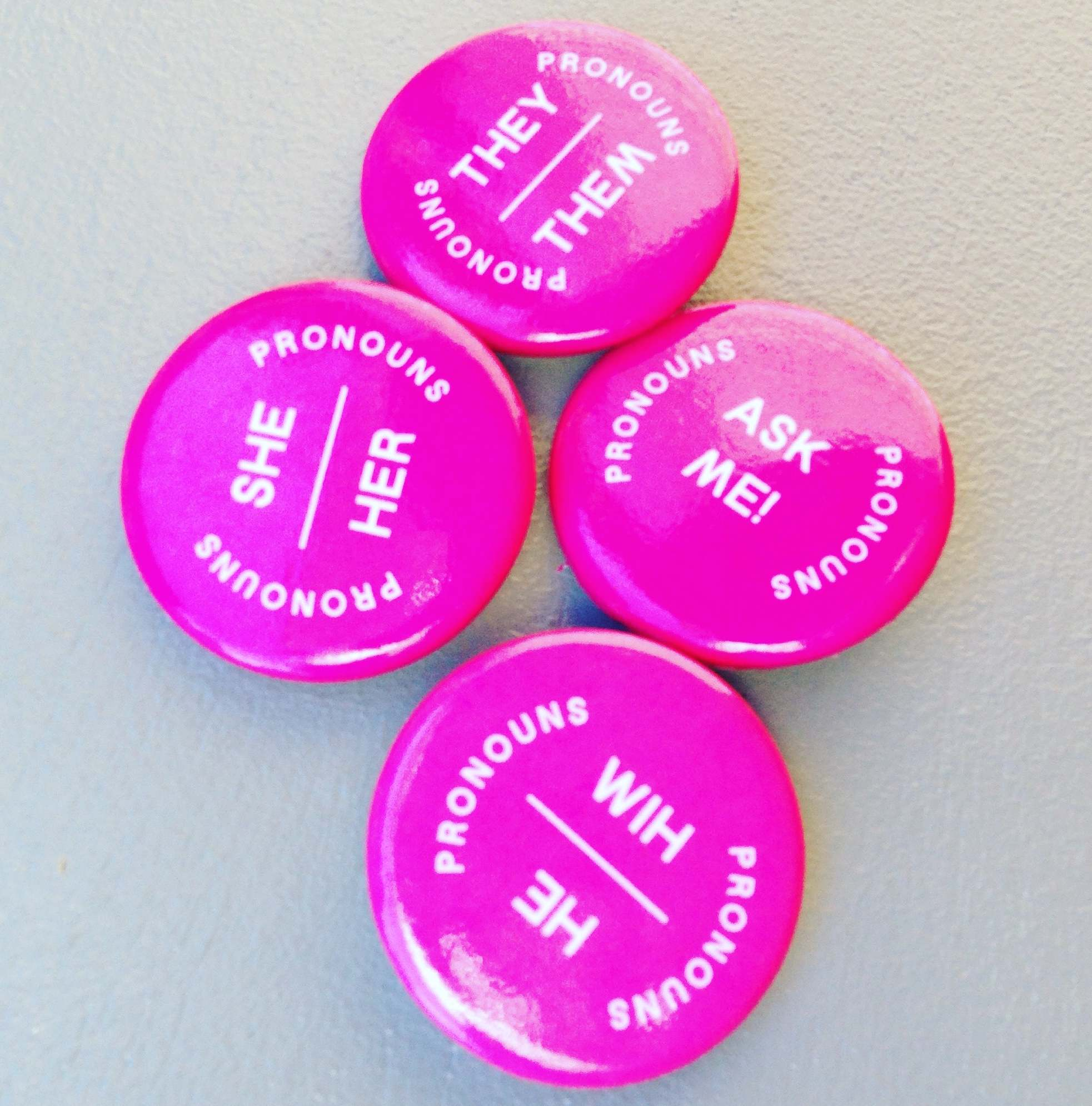
A selection of pronoun pins provided at the 2016 XOXO art and technology festival in Portland.

Overall, queer representation in the high fashion world appears to be growing and to be increasingly acknowledged by the media. Examples of queer/non-binary models are Casey Legler, labelled as the world's first "female male model", Elliott Sailors, Rain Dove, Stas Fedyanin and Erika Linder.

== Pronoun pins ==
Pronoun pins and pins with queer flags on them are a common staple of late 2010s and early 2020s queer fashion. After a lawsuit with the ACLU, Alaska Airlines became the first US airline to include pronoun pins in their workplace uniforms in April 2022.

== See also ==
- Androgyny in fashion
- Bisexual chic
- Butch and femme
- Camp (style)
- Drag king
- Drag queen
- Fetish fashion
- Genderless fashion in Japan
- Handkerchief code
- Leather subculture
- Queer art
