= Michael Fish (fashion designer) =

British fashion designer (1940–2016)

- Fish in 1967
- Born: 1940; Wood Green, London, England
- Died: 2016 (aged 75–76); United Kingdom
- Occupation: Fashion designer

Michael Fish (1940 – 2016) was a British fashion designer famous for designing many of the notable British looks of the 1960s and 1970s, such as the kipper tie.

== Career ==
=== As a fashion designer ===
Michael Fish was born in Wood Green, London in 1940. His mother Joan, worked in a chemist shop in Winchmore Hill, and his father, Sydney, was an on-course bookmaker. He had one sister, Lesley and a brother named Philip.

Fish was apprenticed in shirtmaking, and by the early 1960s was designing shirts at traditional men's outfitters Turnbull & Asser of Jermyn Street. His designs reflected, and helped to inspire the peacock revolution in men's fashion design, which was a reaction against the conservatism of men's dress at the time. His shirts were floral in pattern and often included ruffles and other adornments.

In 1966, he opened the menswear shop, Mr. Fish, with his business partner Barry Sainsbury (1929–1999). The shop was located at 17, Clifford Street, Mayfair and specialized in flamboyant menswear, particularly bespoke shirts and ties.

Fish's boutique gained a reputation for offering flamboyant, attention-getting clothing. Notable celebrities of the 1960s and 1970s such as Peter Sellers, Lord Snowdon and David Bowie wore Fish's designs.

By the middle 1970s, Mr. Fish closed, and Fish took a job with Sulka in New York, a label famous for its silk foulard dressing gowns. In 1978, he returned to London to work for Jeremy Norman as greeter at the Embassy Club in Bond Street, which had a reputation at the time as the London equivalent of Studio 54.

Mr. Fish designs set fashion trends, the kipper tie being one unique example. He was also known for the polo neck sweater look, which debuted in New York and London in the winter of 1967. Perhaps the most controversial of Fish's designs was the "dress" designed to be worn by men, which was occasionally worn by such rock stars as David Bowie (including on the cover of the album The Man Who Sold the World) and Mick Jagger in the Hyde Park charity concert (including in the film Performance).

After he suffered a stroke in 2004, Fish's brand was purchased by David Mason.

=== Film work ===
Fish's designs could be seen in films between the middle 1960s and the early 1970s. In the film Performance, Mick Jagger wears one of Fish's dresses for men. Fish was credited as a costume designer for the Peter Sellers film There's a Girl in My Soup. Fish also designed the velvet jackets and ruffled shirts worn by Jon Pertwee for the duration of his five-year tenure as the Third Doctor on Doctor Who.

=== Personal life ===
In 2004, Fish suffered a ruptured aorta which led to a severe stroke. He then lived in a nursing home until his death in 2016. Fish was never married and had no children.

== Gallery ==
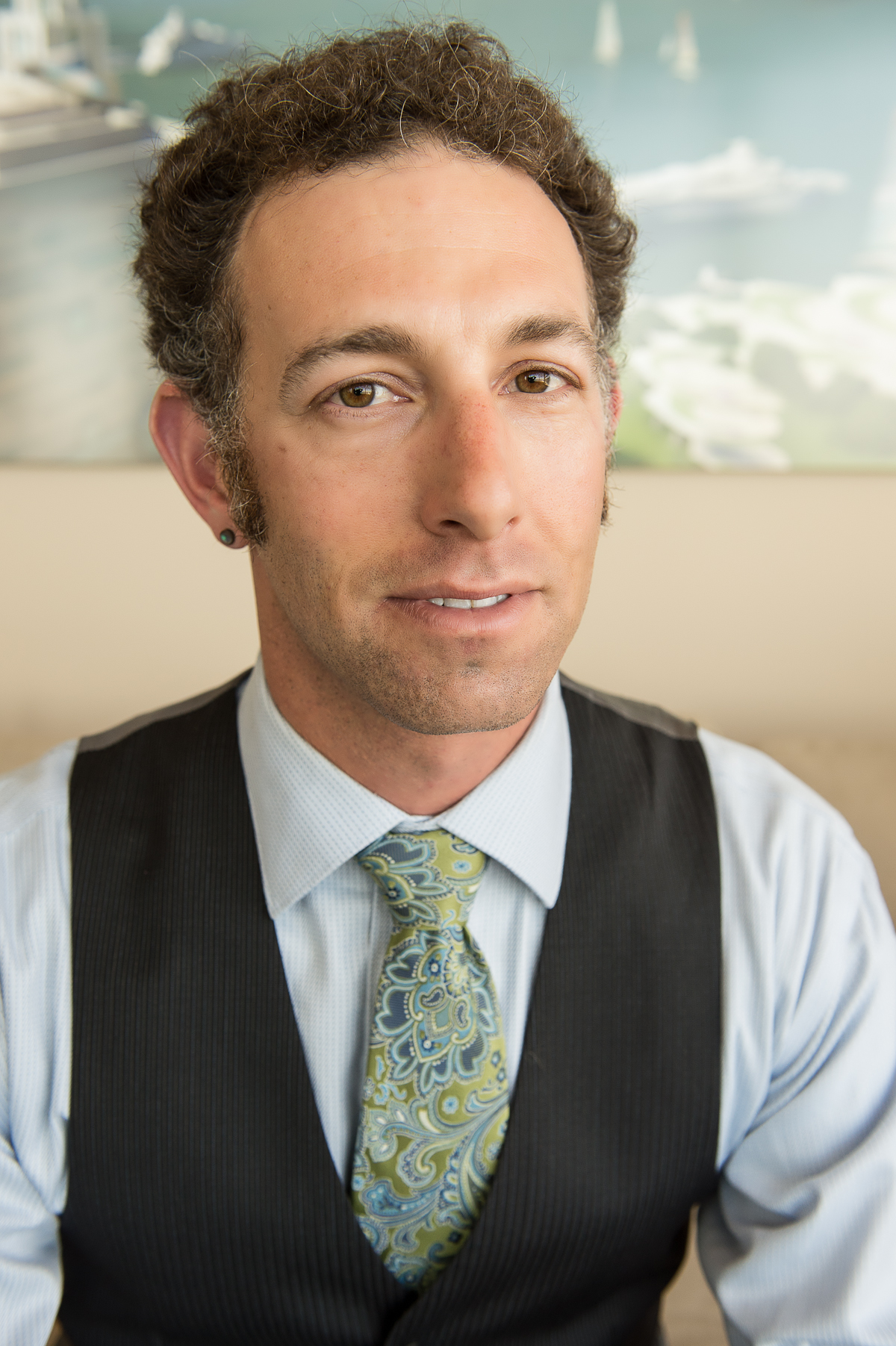
Executive Director of The Seasteading Institute wearing a kipper tie in 2012 similar to those designed early in Michael Fish's career.

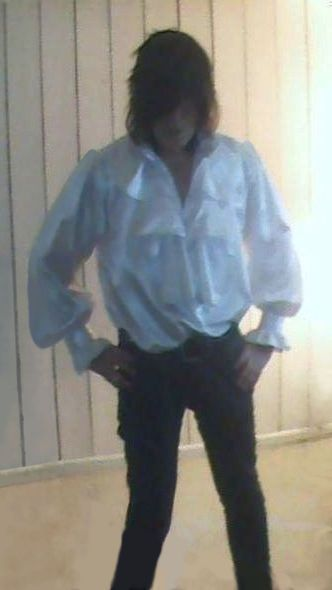
Fish regularly created blouses and dresses with "poet" style ruffles, most notoriously for Mick Jagger playing Hyde Park in 1969 in a men's shirtdress.

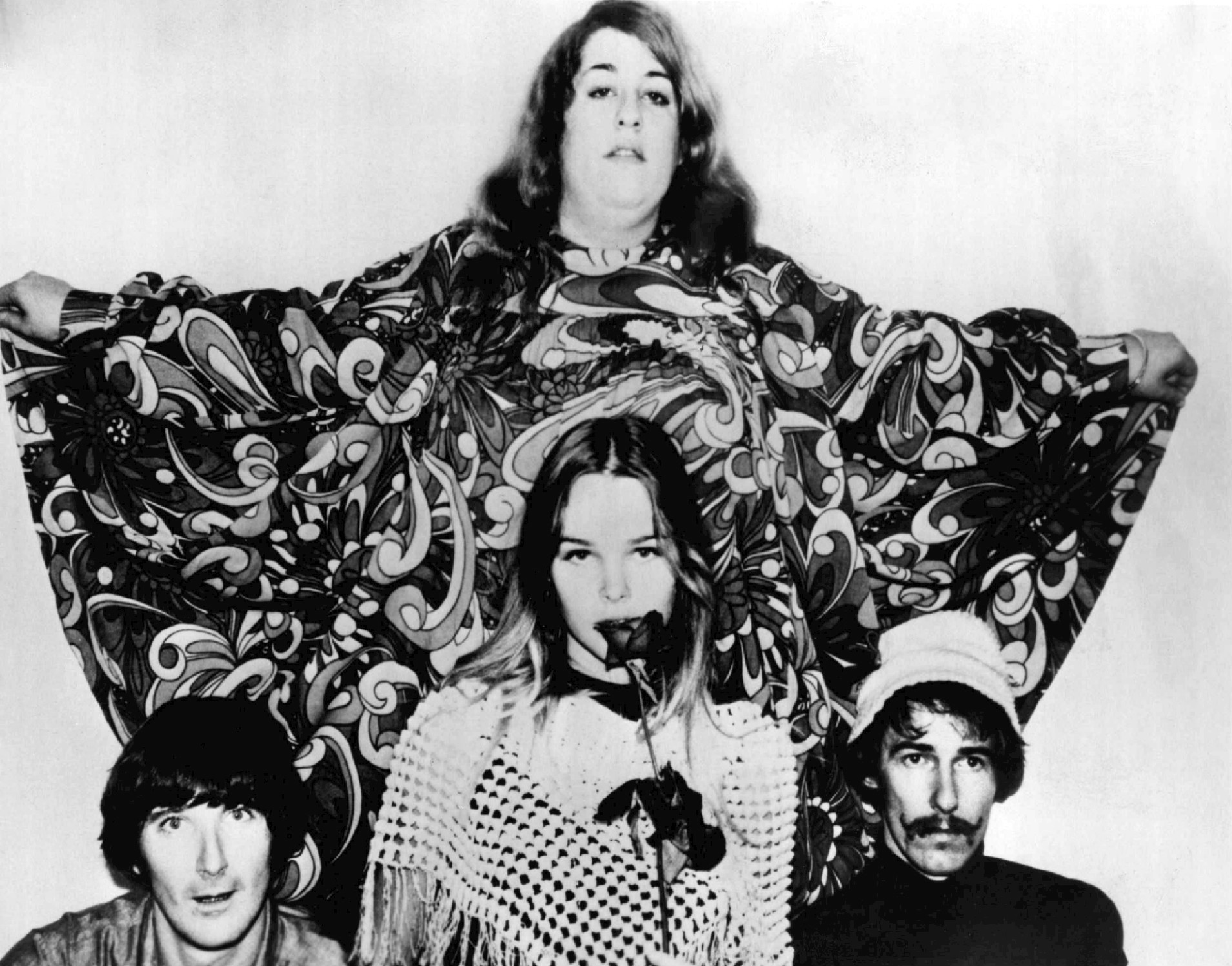
Cass Elliot wearing a kaftan in 1967 that was most likely designed by Michael Fish.

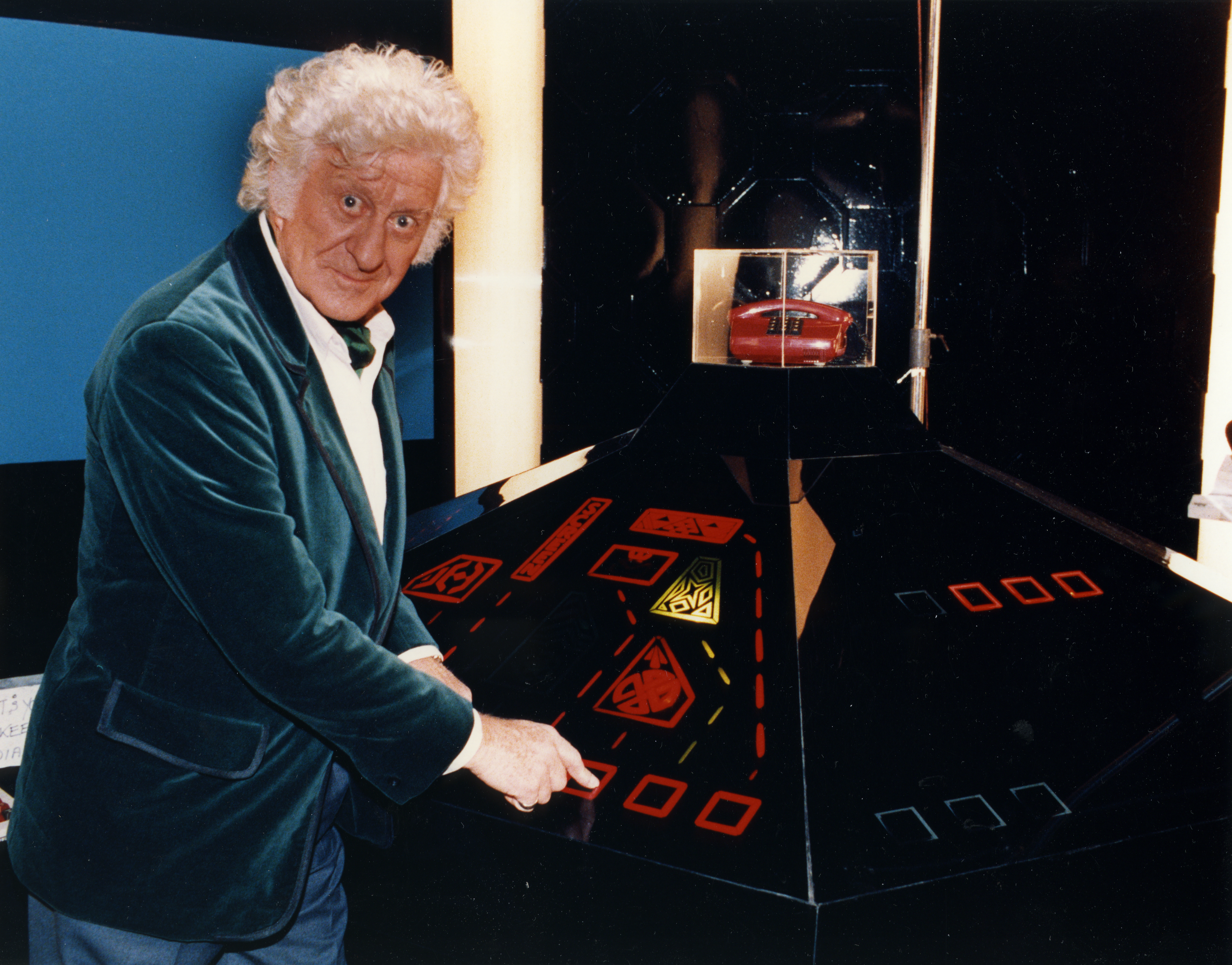
Fish designed Jon Pertwee's velvet jackets for his role as the Third Doctor on Doctor Who.
