= Domenico Spano =

Italian-born American clothier

Domenico "Mimmo" Spano (August 17, 1944 – October 23, 2023) was an Italian-born American clothier known for his work in men's fashion.

== Early life and education ==
Born in Scigliano, Italy, Spano was the middle child of Salvatore Spano and Elisabetta Oliva. He attended the Istituto Tecnico per Geometri, where he graduated as a land surveyor in 1963. Later, he studied at Suola Ufficiali Carabinieri military school in Florence in 1970. He moved to the United States after marrying Rina Gangemi, an American studying in Florence, in 1972.

== Career ==
Spano began his career in the fashion industry as a bookkeeper in his father-in-law's custom clothing business in Midtown Manhattan before advancing to roles at other retailers such as Dunhill and Alan Flusser, and later at luxury department stores Bergdorf Goodman and Saks Fifth Avenue. Eventually, he established his own atelier on West 57th Street in New York City. In 2009, he was given the Saks Fifth Avenue's Men's Wear Icon Award.

Known for his adherence to classic American style, Spano drew inspiration from the elegant aesthetics of early Hollywood public figures such as Fred Astaire and Cary Grant. Despite prevailing trends towards more casual attire, he maintained a traditional approach in his designs.
