= Mantua (Kimberley Hall) =

Complete 17th-century garment

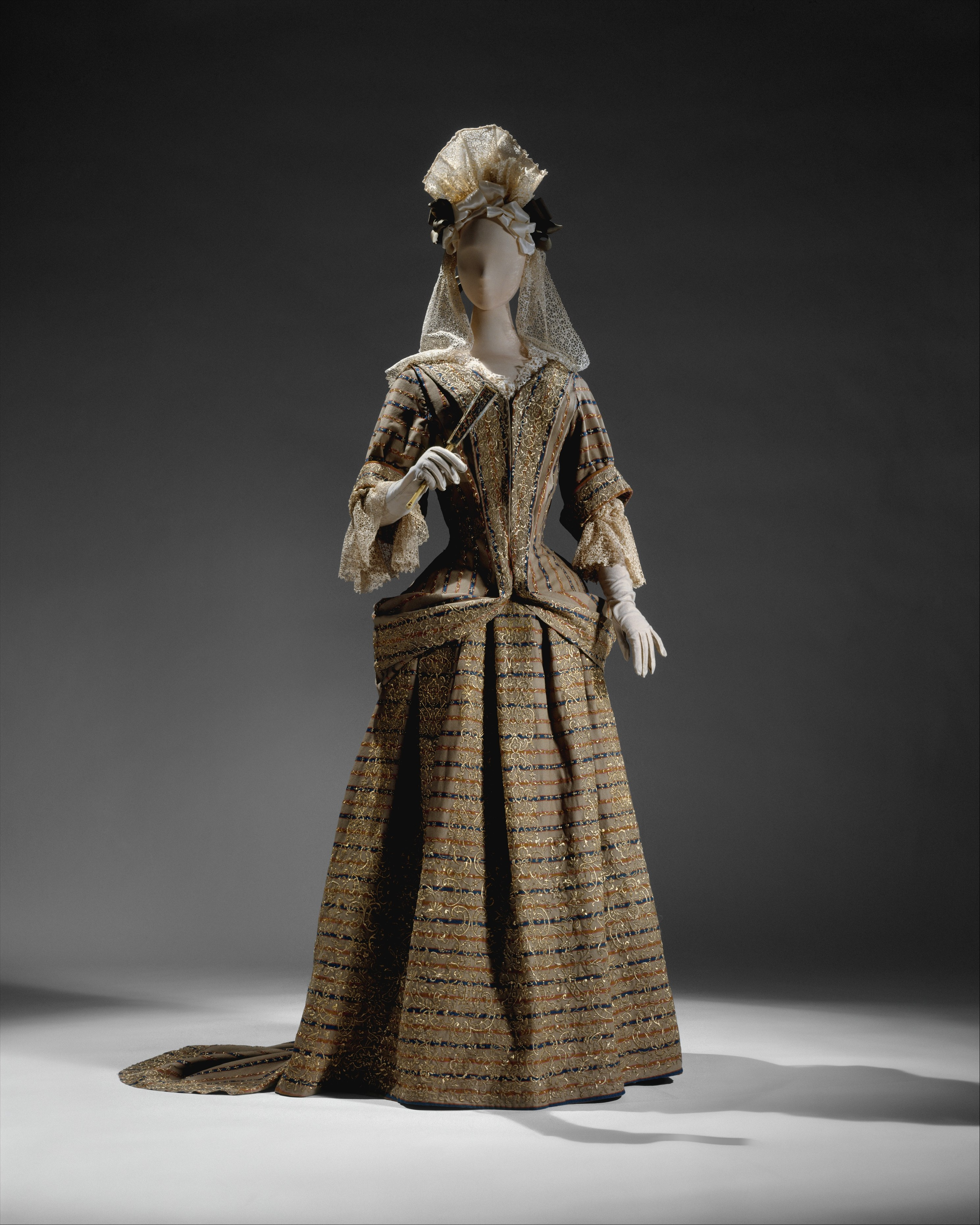
Mantua, The Met, item 33.54a, b

A mantua from the collection at Kimberley Hall in Norfolk is the earliest complete European women's costume in the Costume Institute of the Metropolitan Museum of Art in New York. Also known as the Kimberley Gown, this formal dress is a mantua, a two-piece costume consisting of a draped open robe and a matching underskirt or petticoat, and has been dated to ca. 1690–1700.

== Cut and structure ==
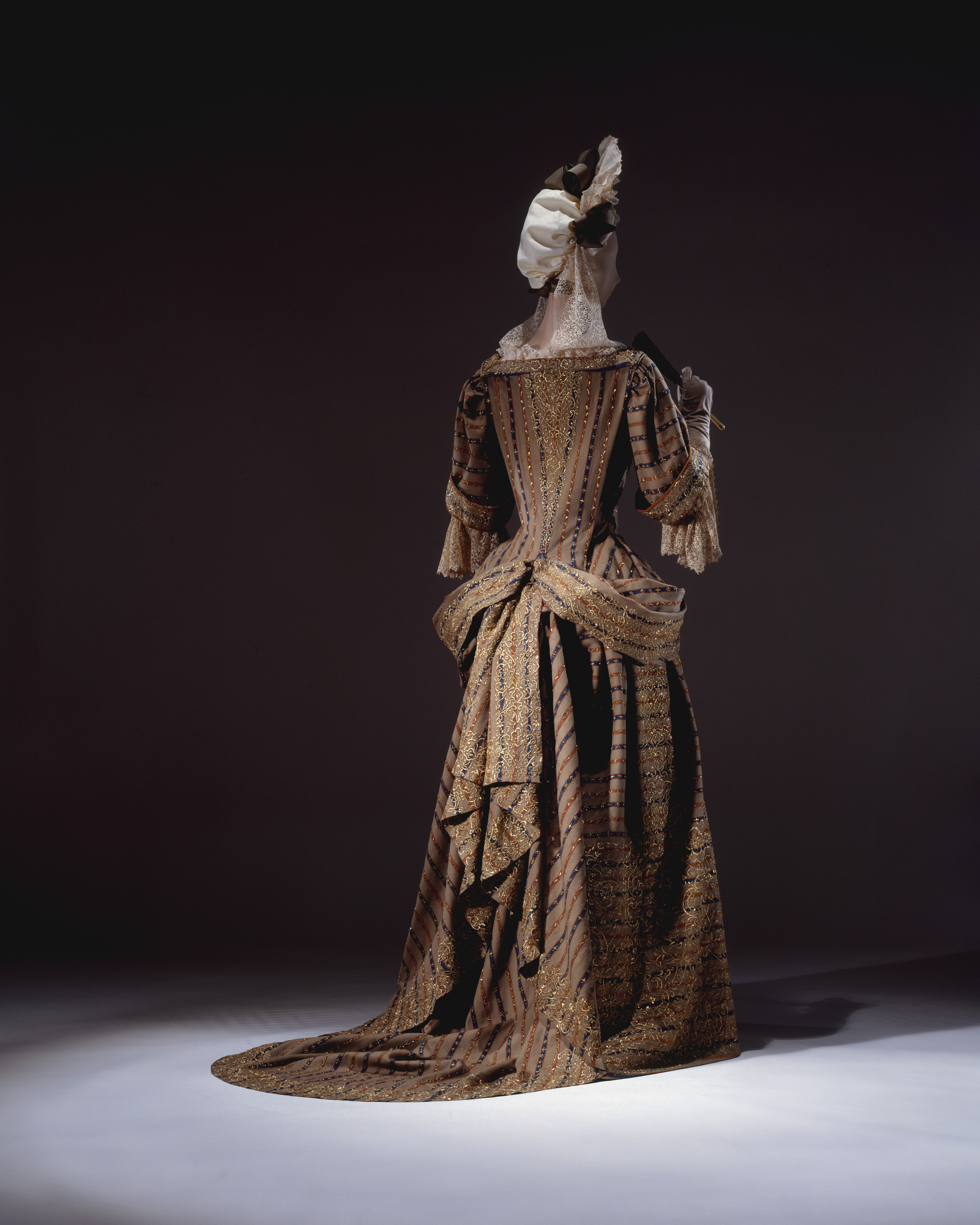
Mantua, back view

The mantua or manteau was a new fashion that arose in the 1670s. The dresses of the previous period featured a separate bodice and skirt. In contrast, the mantua hung from the shoulders to the floor. The earliest mantua was a loose gown worn for 'undress' wear. Gradually it developed into a draped and pleated dress and then into a dress worn looped up over a contrasting petticoat and a stomacher. The mantua-and-stomacher resulted in a high, square neckline in contrast to the broad, off-the-shoulder neckline previously in fashion. The Kimberley mantua reflects a development of the style in the 1690s, when the back was pleated to fit and the front edges of the overskirt were pulled up to the waistline at the center back.

The skirt panels are cut in a curve to allow some sort of padding to be worn beneath. It is clear that the dress has been altered: "the gown's sleeves were shortened or otherwise reshaped by cutting. Either then or in more recent times the cuffs were restitched to make them narrower. It was in recent times that the main sleeve seams were taken in from 1 to 2 inches and that the side seams of the bodice, running from under the arms to the waist, were also taken in about two inches. The two pleats at the front of the bodice, and the pleats at the back, have been altered. It seems likely that the back showed only two pleats originally rather than four."

Costume historians Blanche Payne and Norah Waugh took cutting diagrams or patterns from the mantua, which appear as Draft 13a and B in Payne's History of Costume (1965) and as Diagram IX in Waugh's The Cut of Women's Clothes 1600-1930 (1968).

Of the dress, Payne wrote "One must see it to appreciate it, and the more closely it is examined, the greater the admiration and respect it arouses."

== Materials ==
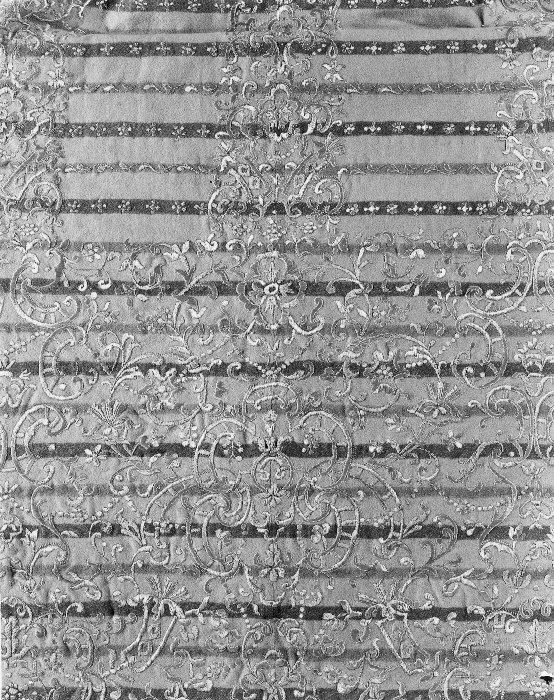
Detail of the striped wool and silver-gilt embroidery.

Unlike the majority of surviving mantuas, which are made of the rich brocaded silks popular at the turn of the 18th century, the Kimberley mantua is a more practical winter costume, made of striped woolen fabric embroidered with silver-gilt yarns. The fabric, sometimes described as broadcloth, is actually a "soft, fine, tabby-woven (over one, under one) woolen fabric that has been given a napped surface though not the dense, felted finish characteristic of broadcloth." The background color is something between "brownish" and "warm grey". The stripes, woven parallel to the weft (across the width of the fabric), are "ultramarine" blue "bordered by vibrant terracotta" and "dark mustard yellow" "bordered by a pair of magenta stripes".

The stripes are embroidered with a pattern of alternating four- and five-petaled blossoms on the blue stripes and leafy vines on the mustard stripes.

In addition to the striped fabric and its small embroidered motifs, the lower part of the petticoat, to about knee-height, is decorated with an elaborate scrolling design in silver-gilt thread that suggests gold lace. The pattern is similar to lace panels of the period, and is strictly symmetrical, in keeping with the taste of the late Baroque.

What appear to be original seams are sewn with two sewing silks, "one pale beige, not plied, the other dark brown and plied." The mantua was subsequently altered, possibly to accommodate a taller wearer; many of these alterations are made with a "plied, ocher-colored sewing silk."

== Provenance ==
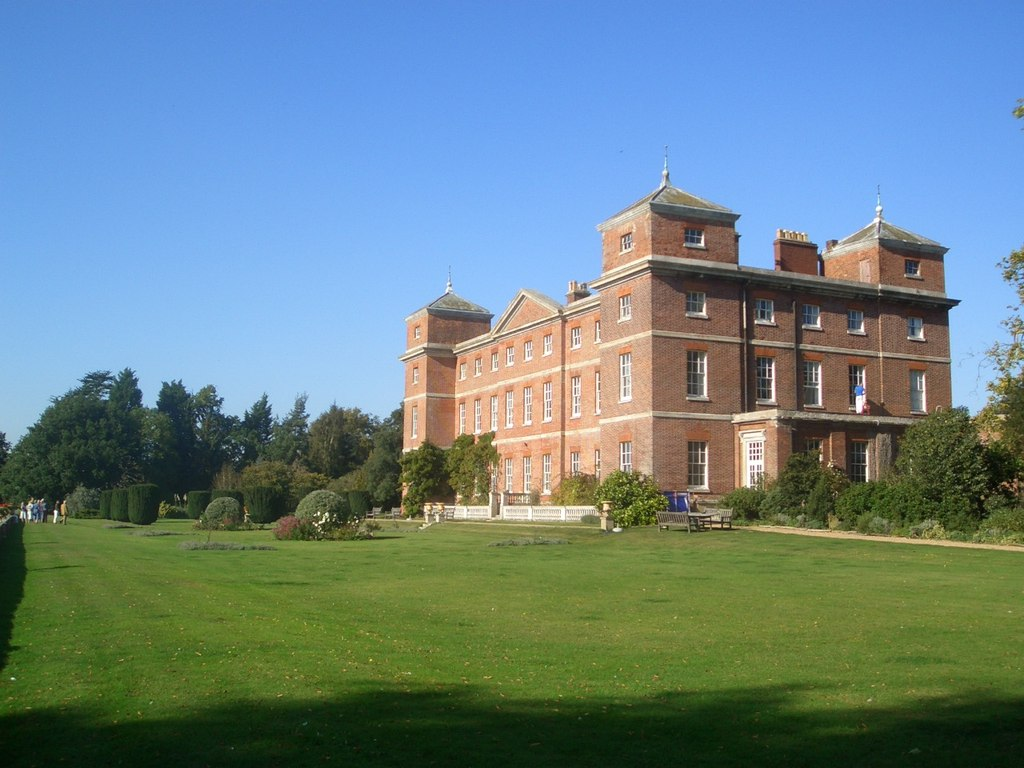
Kimberley Hall

The mantua came to public notice in 1932, when it was exhibited in London at the Art Treasures Exhibition held at Christie, Manson and Woods from October 12 to November 5. The exhibitors, Acton, Surgey, Ltd., did not indicate a source for the gown in the catalogue, but they exhibited it with other items from Kimberley Hall, near Norwich, home of the Wodehouse family, and named Kimberley Hall as its source in later correspondence. The Met negotiated with Acton, Surgey that winter, and bought the gown, with income from the Rogers Fund, in April 1933.

== See also ==
- List of individual dresses
