= Mantua (clothing) =

Draped and pleated woman's dress

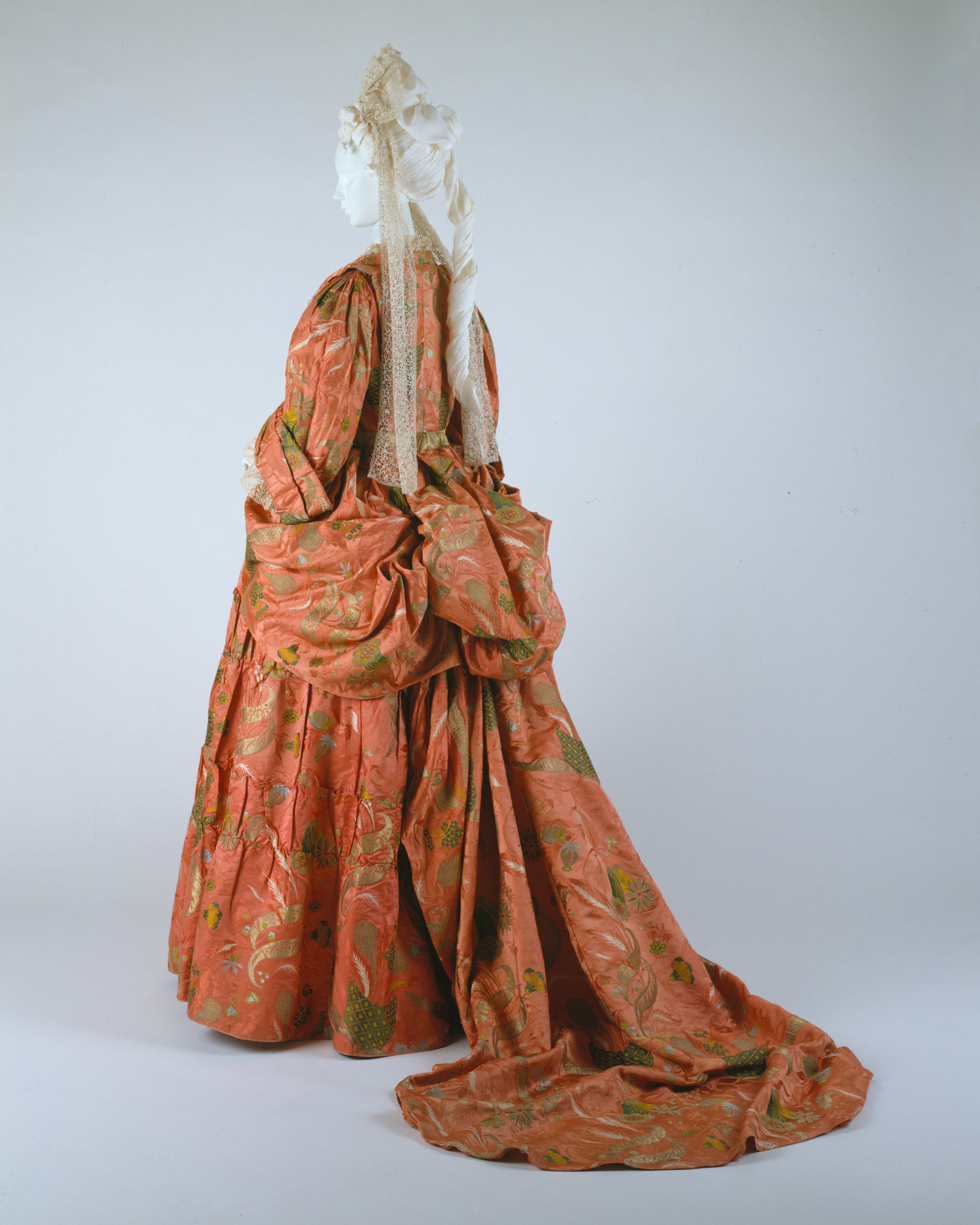
Mantua and petticoat of bizarre silk brocade, British, c. 1708 (MET)

A mantua (from the French manteuil or 'mantle') was an article of women's clothing worn in the late 17th century and 18th century. Initially a loose gown, the later mantua was an overgown or robe typically worn over stays, stomacher and either a co-ordinating or contrasting petticoat.

The mantua or manteau was a new fashion that arose in the 1670s. Instead of a bodice and skirt cut separately, the mantua hung from the shoulders to the floor (like dresses of earlier periods). It started as the female version of the men's banyan, worn for "undress" wear. Gradually the mantua developed into a draped and pleated dress and eventually evolved into a dress worn looped and draped up over a contrasting petticoat and a stomacher. The mantua-and-stomacher resulted in a high, square neckline in contrast to the broad, off-the-shoulder neckline previously in fashion. The new look was more modest and covered-up than previous fashions and decidedly fussy, with bows, frills, ribbons, and other trim, but the short string of pearls and pearl earrings or "eardrops" worn since the 1630s remained popular.

The mantua, made from a single length of fabric pleated to fit with a long train, was ideal for showing the designs of the new elaborately patterned silks that replaced the solid-coloured satins popular in the mid-century.

As well as contributing a new style of gown to women's dress, which would remain popular through the 18th century, the mantua formalised women dressmakers' and seamstresses’ position as makers of outerwear.

== Etymology ==
The origins of the term mantua, to mean "a robe", are unclear. The garment may have been named after Mantua, in Italy, a centre of production for some of the expensive silks that would have been used to make up such garments. The term may also derive from 'manteau', the French term for a coat.

From this garment arose the term mantua-maker, an early term for a women's dressmaker.

== Evolution of the mantua ==
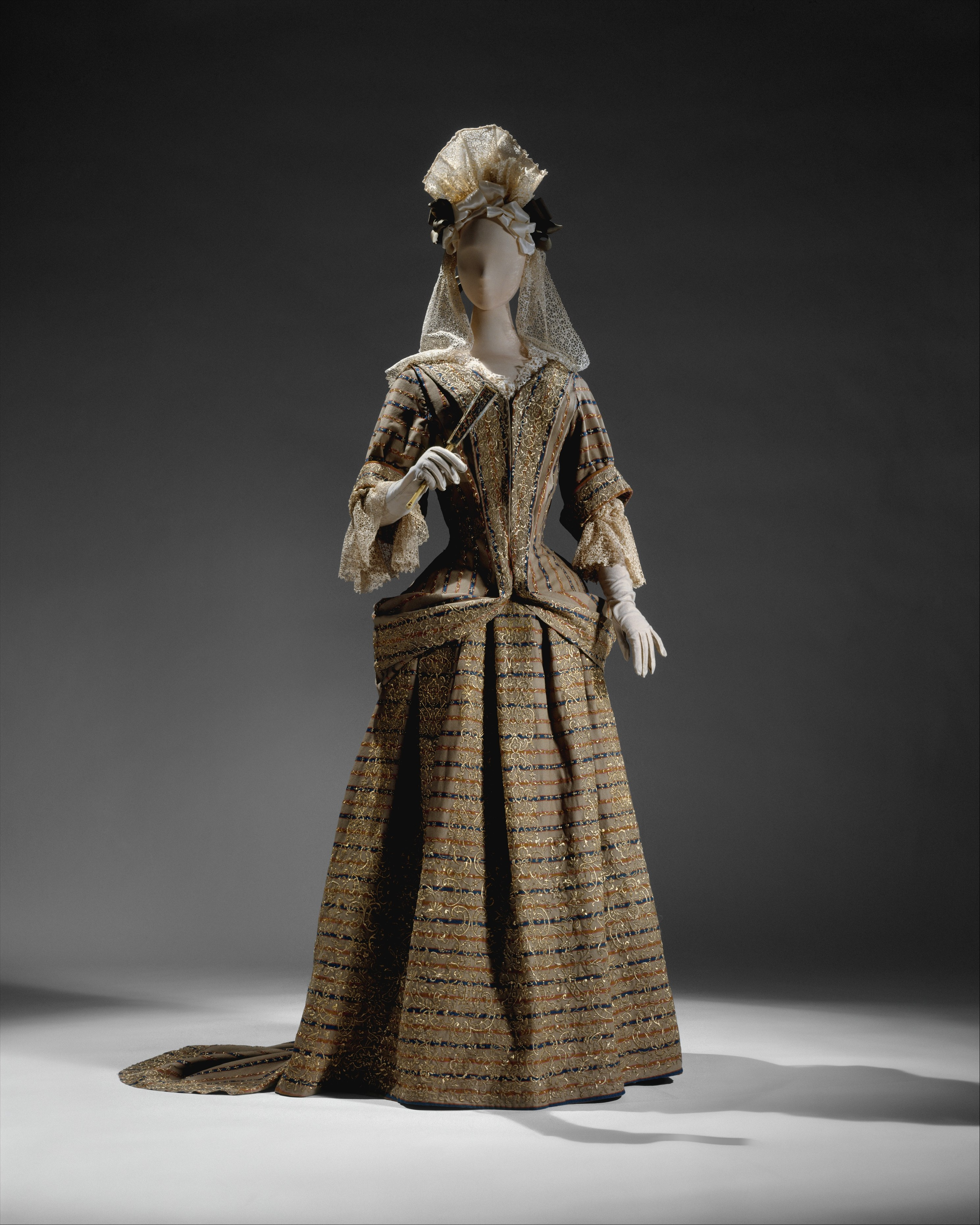
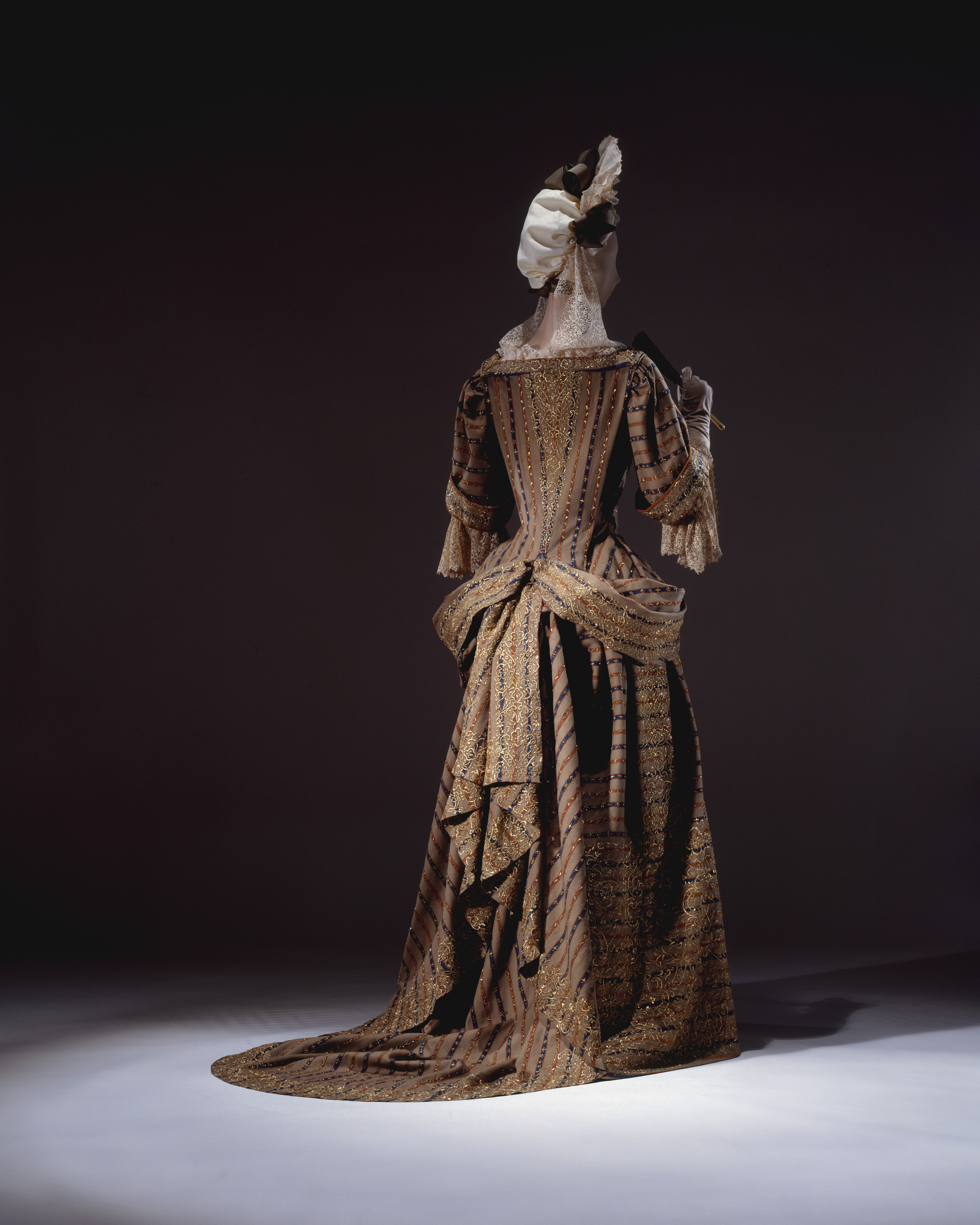
Early mantua and petticoat of striped wool, with metal thread embroidery, British, late 17th century (MET)

Previously, predominantly undertaken by tailors, a trade heavily made up by men, the making of outer-garments only involved women in a less formalised manner. As the mantua began life as a form of "undress" garment, the making of mantua was taken up by seamstresses in their professional capacity as makers of linen apparel, usually worn as undergarments. However, even as the mantua evolved into an accepted form of outer clothing, French dressmakers gained the right, and continually fought to keep making, the mantua, as well as the majority other forms of women's outerwear, during the eighteenth century.

Throughout its time in fashion, the mantua underwent several changes in silhouette.

The earliest mantua emerged in the late 17th century as a comfortable alternative to the boned bodices and separate skirts then widely worn.

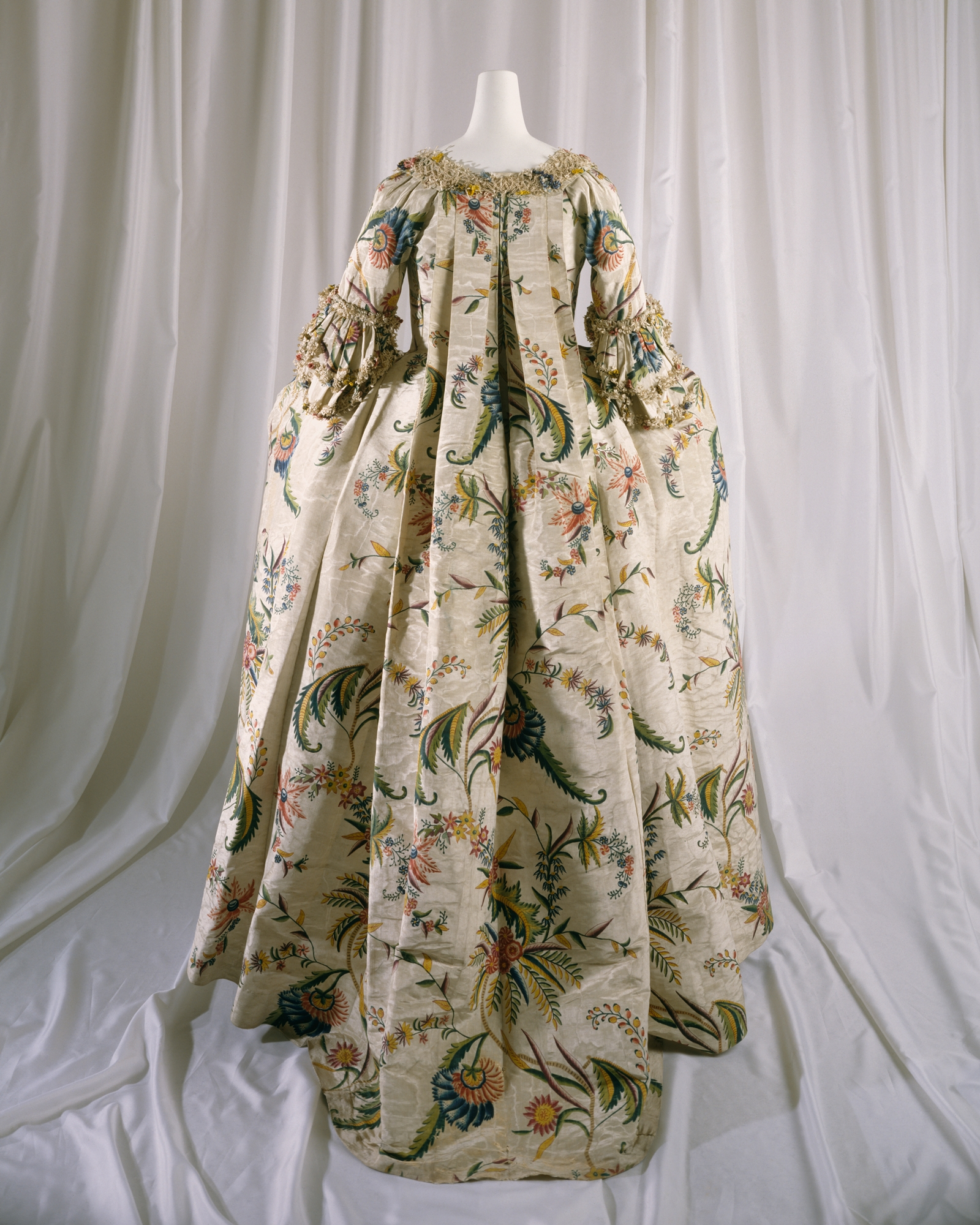
Robe à la française, silk, pigment, linen. British, c. 1740s. Costume Institute: Metropolitan Museum of Art 1995.235a, b.

The mantua featured elbow-length, cuffed sleeves, and the overskirt was typically drawn back over the hips to expose the petticoat beneath. In the earliest mantuas, the long trained skirt was allowed to trail. From about 1710, it became customary to pin up the train. The construction of the mantua was altered so that once the train was pinned up, the exposed reverse of the train showed the proper face of the fabric or embroidery. One of the earliest extant examples of this, dated to 1710–1720, is in the Victoria and Albert Museum's collections.

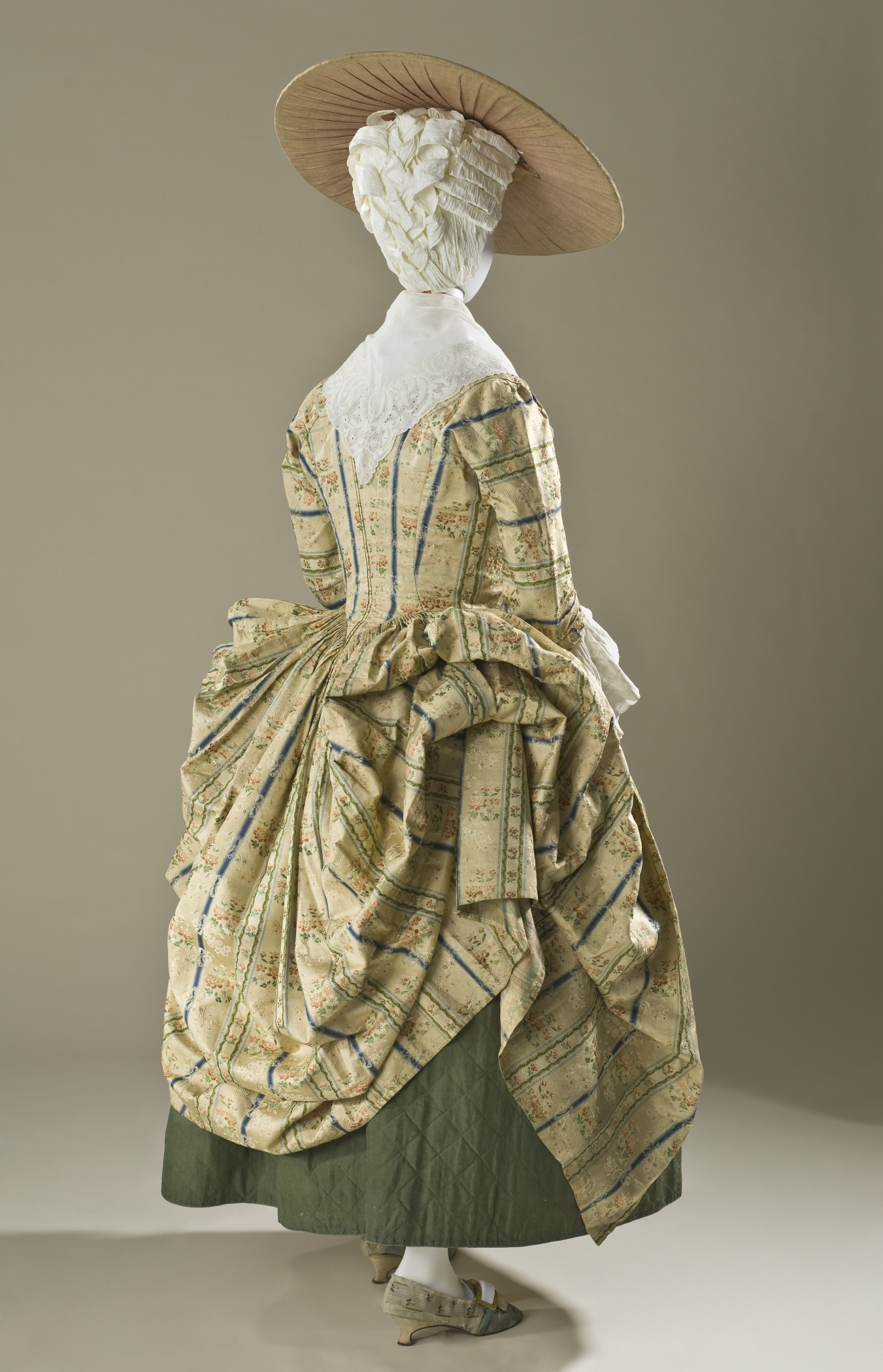
Robe à la polonaise, silk plain weave with supplementary warp- and weft-float patterning. France, c. 1775. Los Angeles County Museum of Art, M.70.85.

By the mid-18th century, the mantua had evolved into a more formal style. The draping of the overskirt became increasingly stylized, with the back panel of the train almost entirely concealed. Known as the sack, sack-back, robe à la française, or French gown, this garment was supported by panniers which expanded in width in the 1740s and 1750s, and fronted by a decorative stomacher. Underskirts were displayed at the front, with two substantial box pleats to the back allowing fabric to trail loosely from the neck to the floor. This style of mantua was most typically worn as formal attire between the 1750s and 1770s.

The three gathered back sections of the skirt and fitted bodice of the 1770s incarnation of the mantua, known as the polonaise gown or robe à la polonaise, were distinct to this style, with the puffed skirt achieved through cording or ribbons. A variant of the polonaise gown was known as the robe à la circassienne.

The robe à l'anglaise or English gown was also a popular style in Europe. The English-style gown featured a fitted back and open front skirt to display decorated underskirts, as in the robe à la française.

The final version of the mantua, which emerged around 1780, bore little resemblance to the original mantua of nearly a century earlier. Instead of the elaborate draperies and folds of the late 17th and early 18th century, the train had evolved into a length of fabric attached to the back of the bodice, as illustrated in an example in the Victoria and Albert Museum.

== Surviving examples ==
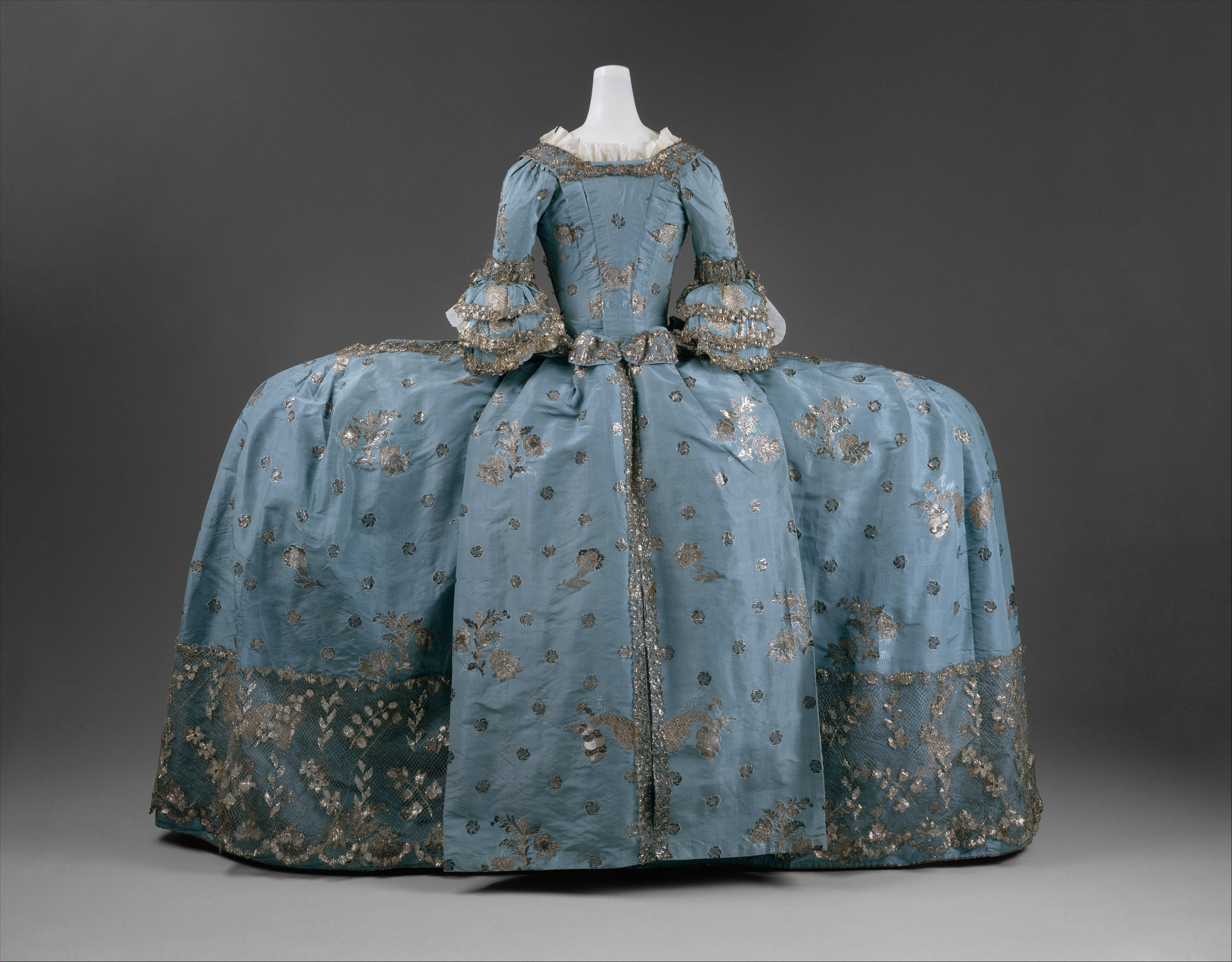
A 1750s court mantua showing the stylized back drapery (MET)

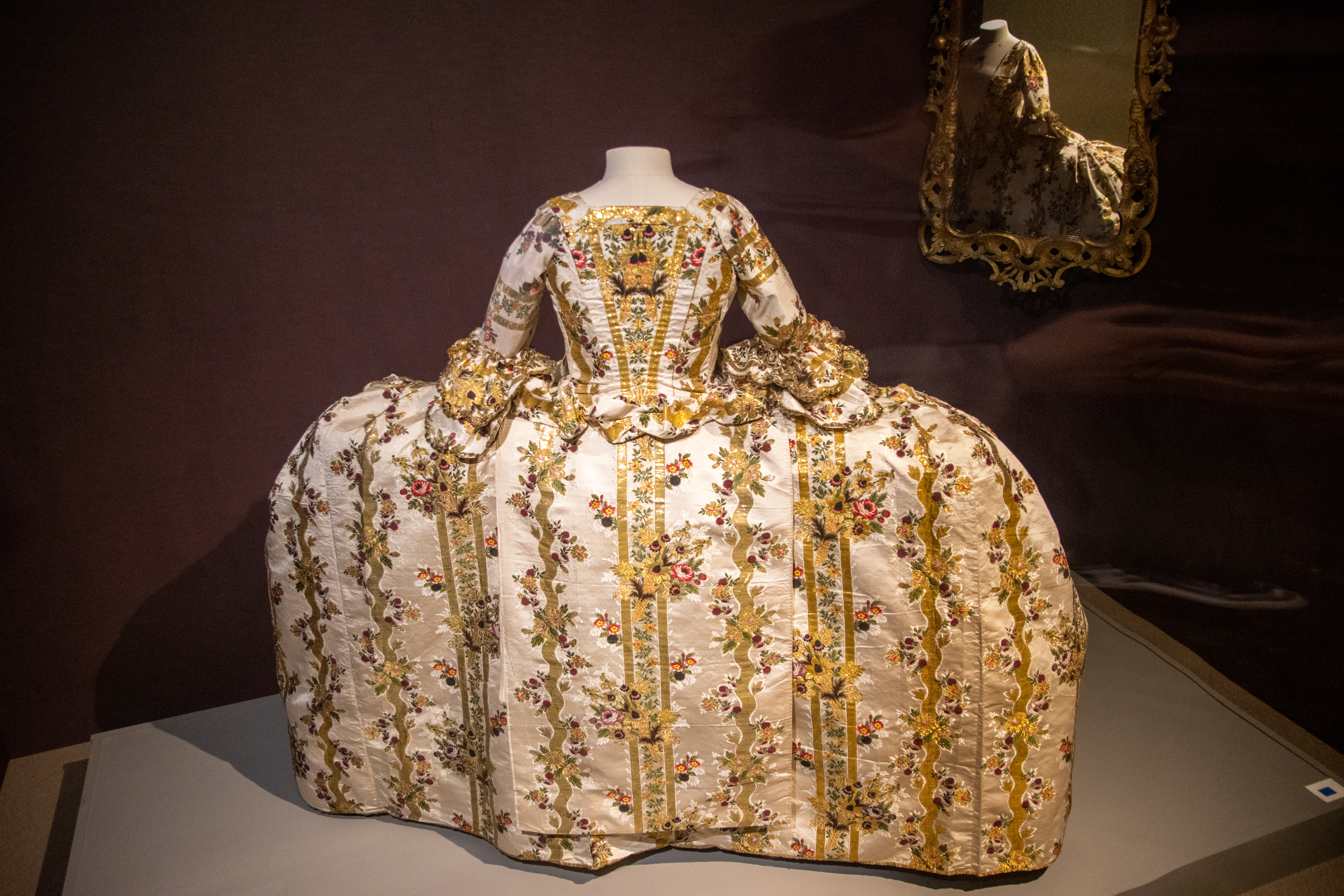
The mantua at Berrington Hall, from c. 1760

Extant examples of the 17th-century mantua are extremely scarce. Perhaps the only known extant adult-size example is an embroidered wool mantua and petticoat in the Metropolitan Museum of Art's Costume Institute. Norah Waugh has published a pattern taken from this mantua. The Victoria and Albert Museum owns an extremely rare late 17th-century fashion doll dressed in a pink silk mantua and petticoat.

Also in the Costume Institute is a mantua and petticoat in salmon pink bizarre silk dated to 1708. Another early mantua, the silk dated to roughly 1708–09 belongs to the Clive House Museum, Shrewsbury; a pattern for this mantua has been taken by Janet Arnold.

Most mantuas preserved in museum collections are formal versions from the mid-18th century, intended for court dress. The Berrington Hall mantua of the 1760s in Berrington Hall, most likely worn by Ann Harley (née Bangham) as Lady Mayoress of London, and a blue silk mantua with matching stomacher and petticoat dated ca. 1750–65 in the collection of the Metropolitan Museum of Art's Costume Institute, are examples of this type of mantua.

== See also ==
- 1650–1700 in fashion
- 1700–1750 in fashion
