= Kipper tie =

Necktie

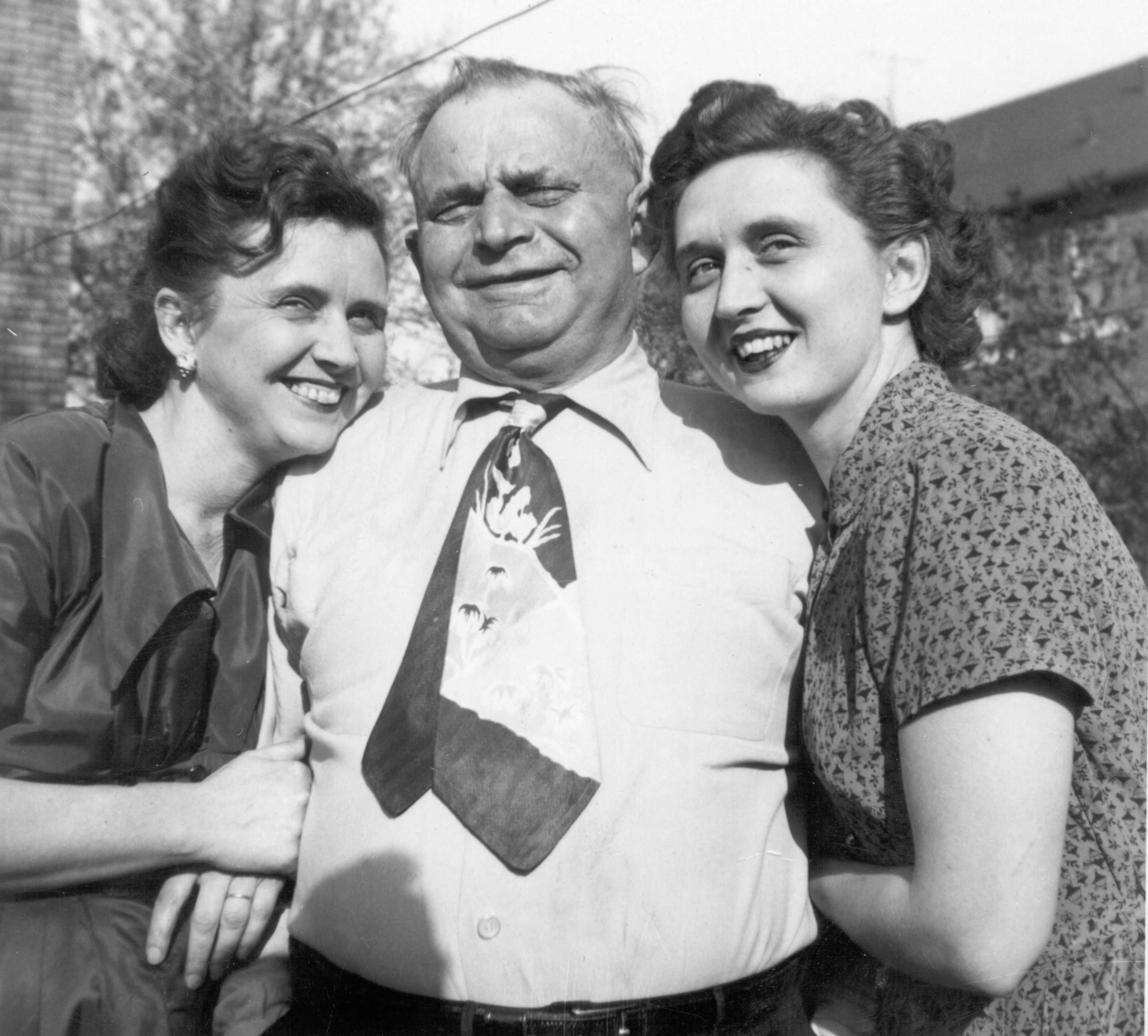
A "Bold Look" tie in 1953.

A kipper tie is a type of necktie primarily fashionable in Britain in the mid-1960s to late 1970s. The primary characteristics of the kipper tie are its extreme breadth (normally 4.5–5 inches (11–13 cm)) and often garish colours and patterns.

== Design origin ==
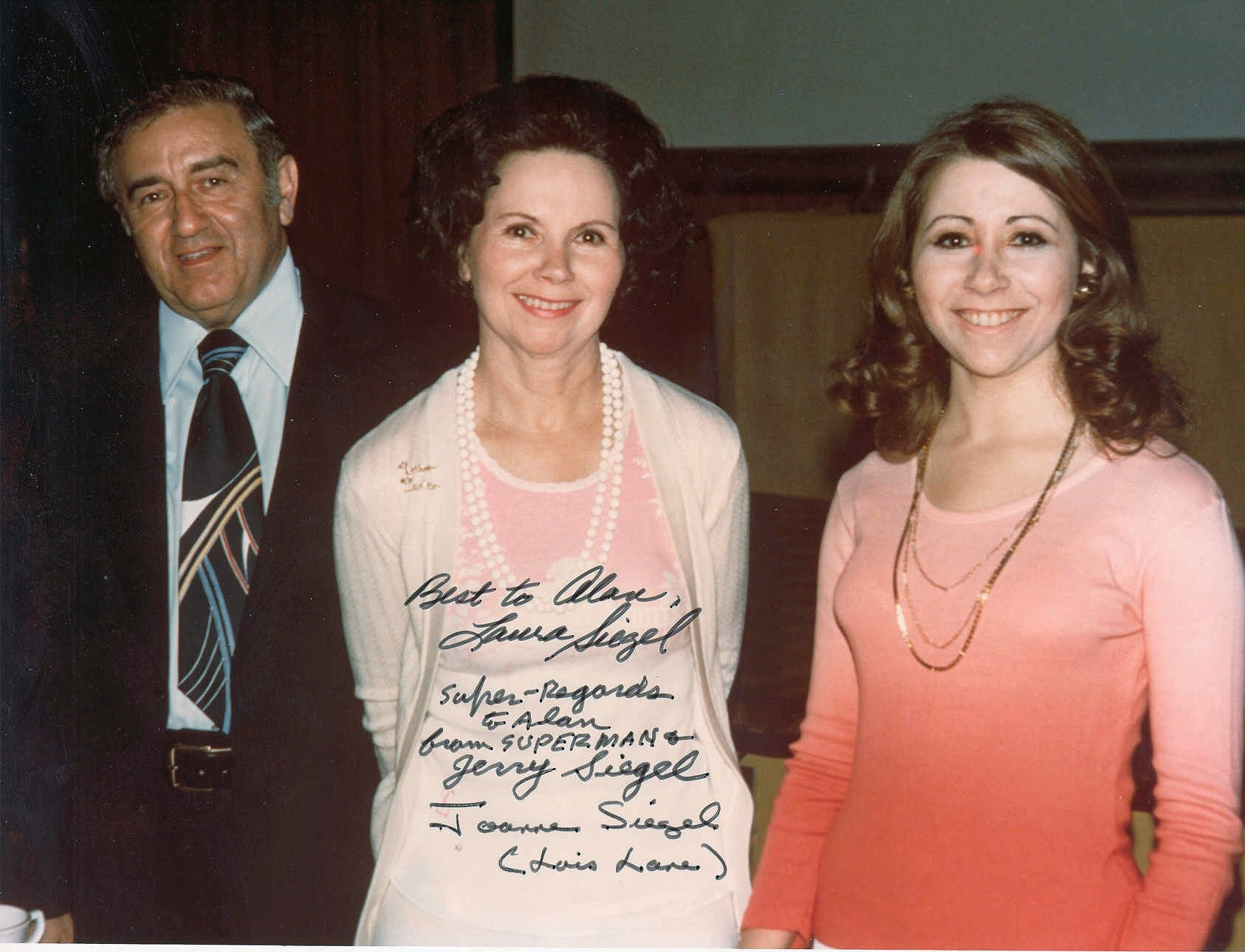
Jerry Siegel wearing a kipper tie, 1970s.

Wide neckties were fashionable in the 1940s: first among Zoot suiters rebelling against wartime austerity, and later as part of the "Bold Look" worn by World War II veterans returning to civilian life. Ties of this period often featured bright colors and bold prints, including birds, animals, and floral designs like paisley. British comedian Max Miller was well known for wearing suits and wide ties made from the same fabric as aloha shirts.

Kipper ties made a comeback among the younger generation during the late 1960s and early 70s as the thin ties and slim fitting Mod suits began to be replaced by the precursors to disco fashion. British fashion designer Michael Fish designed the kipper tie in 1966 in his establishment in Piccadilly.

== Revival ==
Despite the backlash against disco during the early 1980s, thinner kipper ties continued to be worn, often with double-breasted "power suits". The end of the 80s saw ultra-thin ties become fashionable, together with 1950s-inspired bolo ties. In the mid-1990s, kipper ties made a comeback due to a resurgence of interest in 1970s fashion. These were typically darker and less kitsch than those from its heyday. By the 2000s, however, wide ties had become associated with older men, and fell out of favour as skinny ties influenced by indie pop and Mod subculture became fashionable.

== Name of the tie ==
It has alternatively been proposed that the name "kipper tie" is a reference to the extreme breadth of the tie resembling a kipper, or a sly reference to the designer, whose last name, Fish, was evocative of a kipper.

== Subject of humour ==
The terminology itself "kipper tie" forms a part of a joke: "Who says Kipper Tie?" to which the punch line is "A Brummie when you ask him whether he'd like a tea or a coffee!". It makes a joke of the Brummie dialect.
