= Bizarre silk =

Style of figured silk fabric

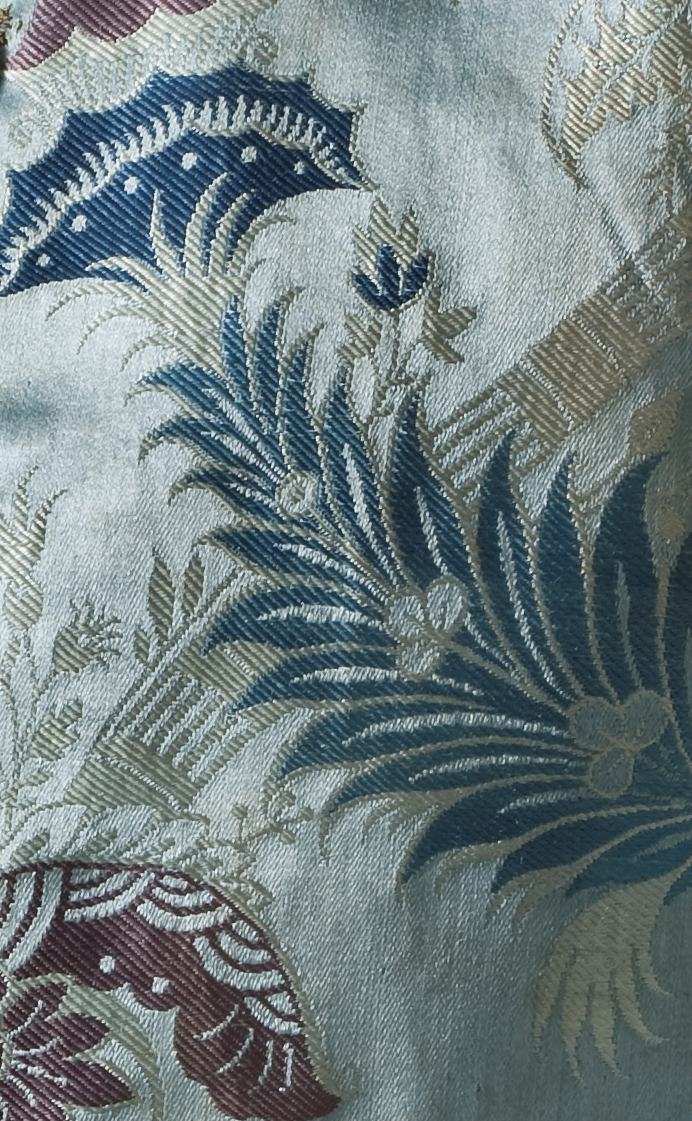
Bizarre silk of circa 1715 features a geometric, diagonal design overlaid with stylized flowers and leaves. Silk satin with supplementary weft patterning bound in twill (lampas). Detail of a sleeved waistcoat, Los Angeles County Museum of Art, M.2007.211.40.

Bizarre silks are a style of figured silk fabrics popular in Europe in the late 17th and early 18th centuries. Bizarre silks are characterized by large-scale, asymmetrical patterns featuring geometrical shapes and stylized leaves and flowers, influenced by a wave of Asian textiles and decorative objects reaching the European market in these decades. Bizarre silks were used for both clothing and furnishings. As a description, the term was first used by Dr. Vilhelm Sloman in the title of a book, Bizarre Designs in Silks published in 1953 in Copenhagen.

== Development ==
The modern name "bizarre silk" reflects the bold colors and lavish use of textured gold and silver threads as well as the distinctive elongated asymmetrical patterns of silk fabrics woven in France, Italy and Britain from about 1695 to 1720. Woven silk designs of the 1670s had featured patterns of decorated stripes, but in the 1680s and 1690s these were replaced by the earliest "proto-bizarre" patterns, which featured exotic elements based on artifacts imported from the East Indies, China and India "indiscriminately combined with the current European taste for bulbous Baroque scrolls." At their most extreme, from 1700 to 1705, bizarre silks feature "some of the most extraordinary shapes to be introduced into silk design" before the development of Art Nouveau in the early 20th century. Characteristics of these designs include diagonal emphasis with stretched and distorted botanical motifs.

The development of bizarre designs among the English silk weavers of Spitalfields can be dated quite closely based on surviving textiles and documents. Around 1707 and 1708, bizarre designs combined distorted florals with architectural elements such as arches, canopies, pergolas, and diagonal fences. From 1709 to 1710, the scale of the patterns was reduced and elements of chinoiserie and japonaiserie appeared. After 1710, the bizarre shapes are deemphasized in favor of "increasingly profuse semi-naturalistic flowers". The bizarre period ended with the new fashion for lace-patterned textiles and naturalistic florals in the 1720s.

== Technique and applications ==
Bizarre silks were woven on the drawloom, and the colorful patterns were brocaded or created with floating pattern wefts (lampas). At the height of the fashion, the average repeat of a bizarre silk pattern was 27 inches (69 cm) high and ten inches (25 cm) wide, repeating twice across the width of the fabric. These large-scale designs were perfectly suited to the popular mantua, a woman's gown with long, flowing lines and few seams, and were also popular for men's waistcoats and furnishings.

== Gallery ==
The strong reds, yellows and oranges in textile design drawings of this period are codes for various types of metallic threads.

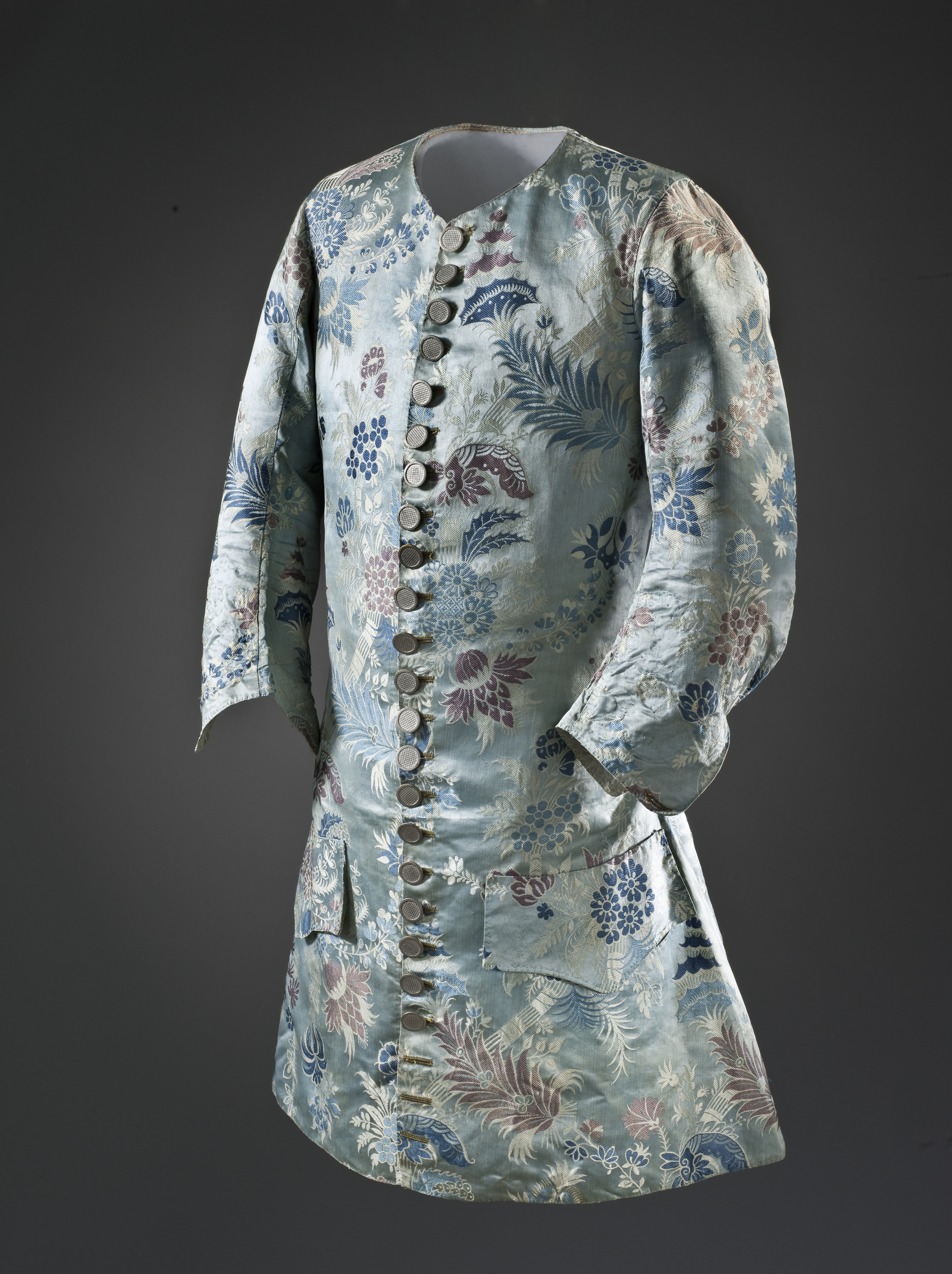
Bizarre silk waistcoat with sleeves, France, c. 1715. LACMA M.2007.211.40

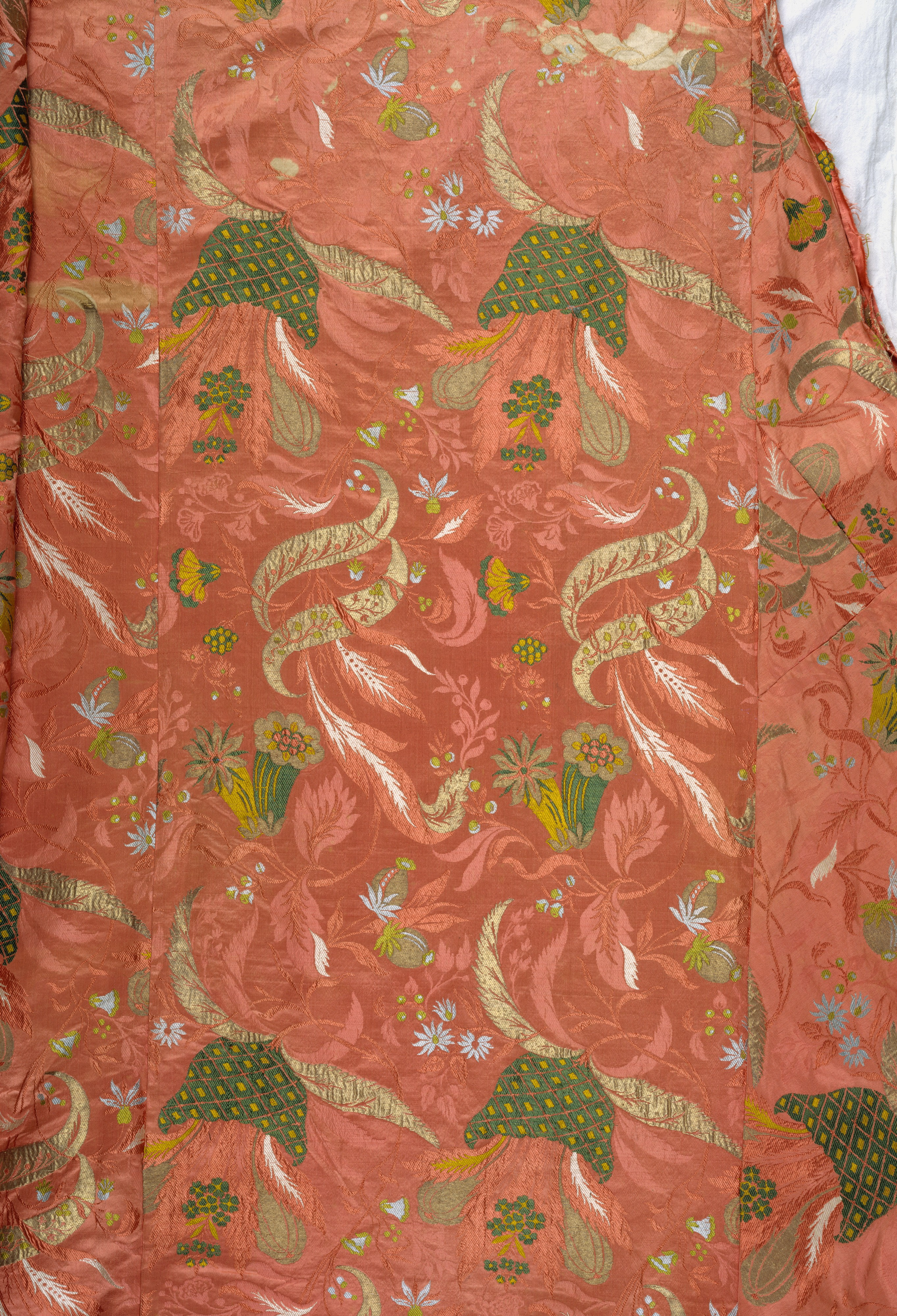
Detail of a salmon pink bizarre silk brocade mantua, c. 1708. Metropolitan Museum of Art

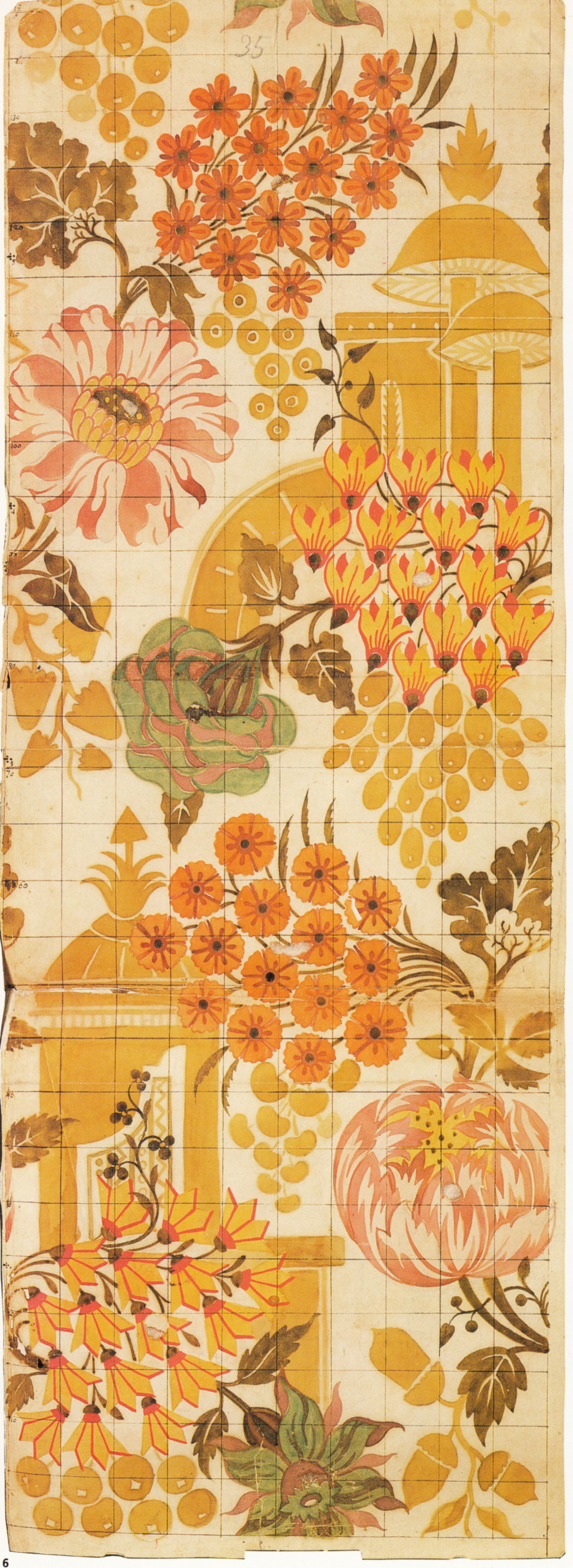
Christopher Baudouin, design for woven silk textile, 1707. Victoria and Albert Museum.

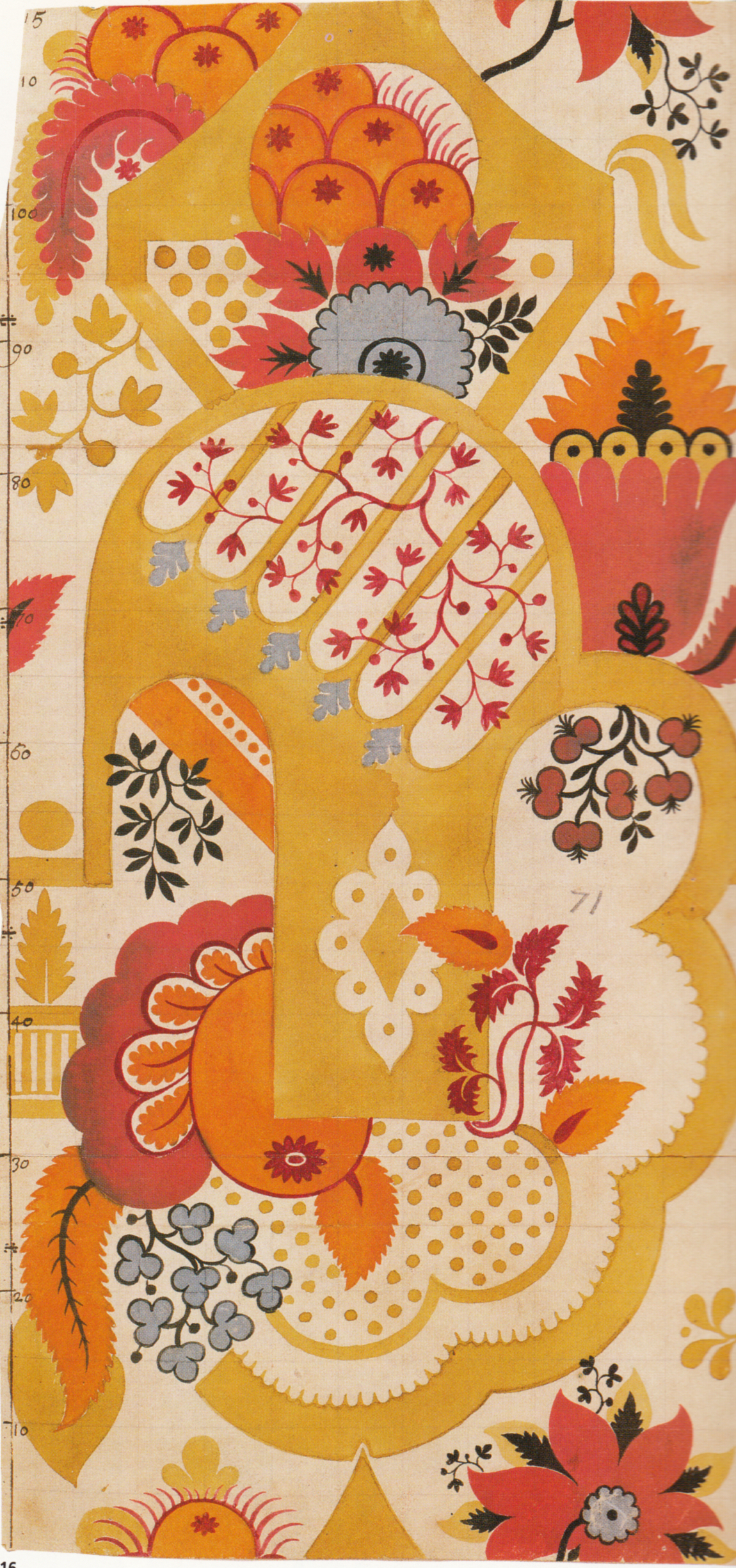
James Leman, design for woven silk textile, 1710. Victoria and Albert Museum.

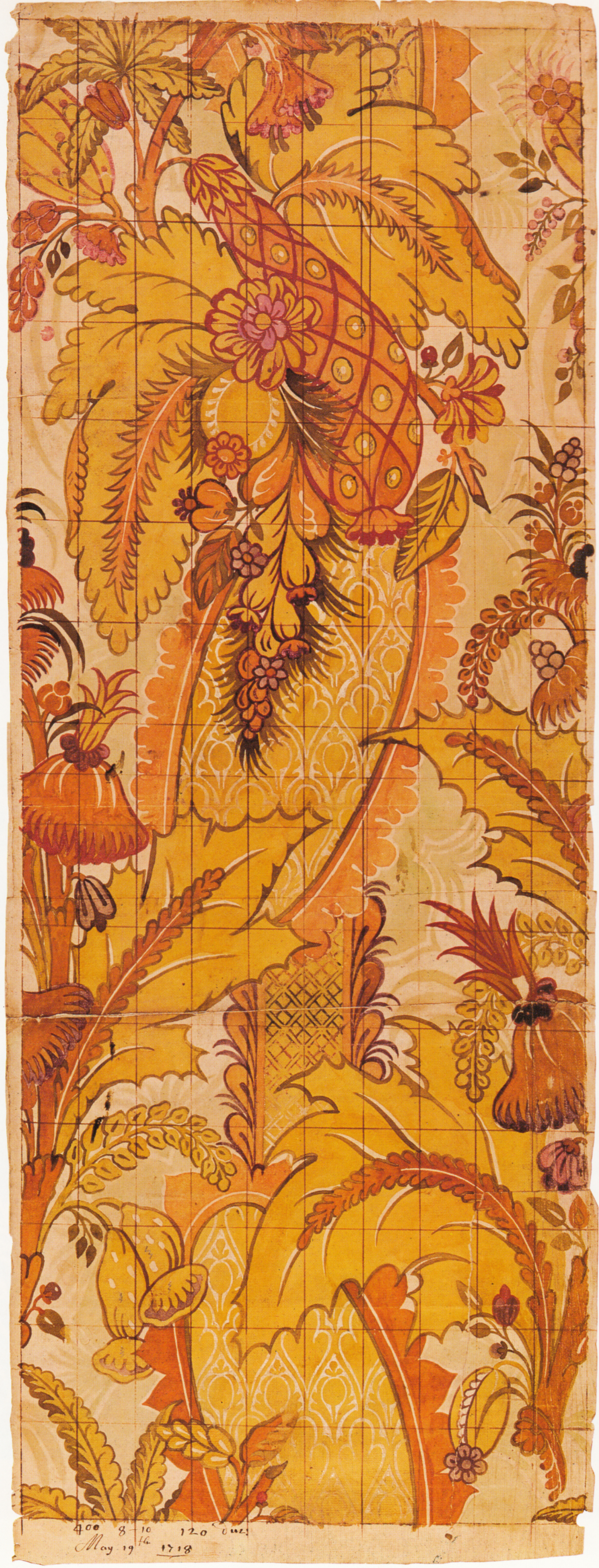
Joseph Dandridge, design for woven silk textile, 1718. Victoria and Albert Museum.
