= Granny dress =

Type of loose-fitting dress

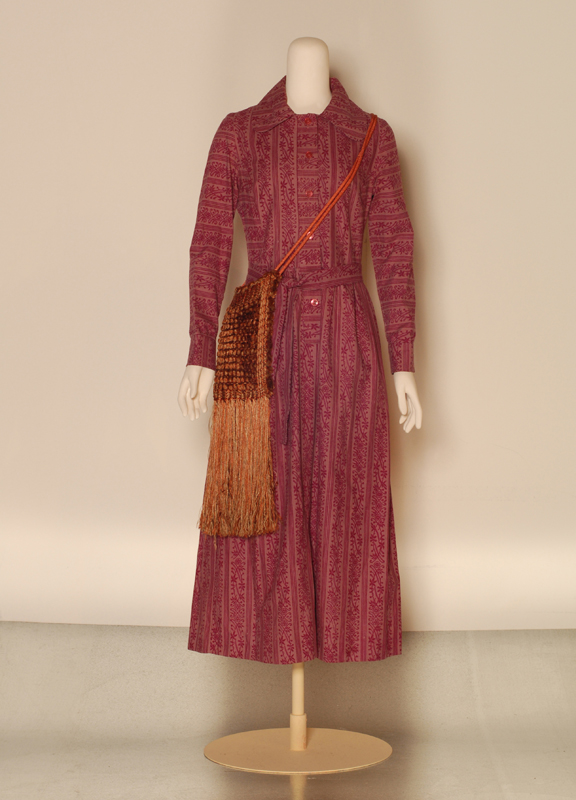
Late 1960s pink and purple cotton print dress by Laura Ashley with fringed shoulder bag

A granny dress is a long one-piece gown or dress that was popular with young women in the United States and Britain from the mid-1960s to the 1970s. Granny dresses were loose-fitting and often printed with light or pastel colours, giving them a vaguely Victorian-era feel.

== History ==
Granny dresses had a high neckline and the hems were ankle length. They could also be decorated with buttons, lace, or ruffles, and may display leg-of-mutton sleeves. As the trend continued, the hemline of the dress could also end just above the knees. The dress became more sophisticated by the late 1960s. It was typically seen as a modest dress that covered a larger portion of the body, as opposed to more exposing attire seen at the time. The dresses were also considered inexpensive.

The look was part of a greater neo-Victorian trend. A Life magazine spread featured Ringo Starr with a model wearing a crocheted granny dress and also featured women in Victorian-like settings. The style reminded people of a simpler, less complicated time, therefore making the dress more popular.

The trend was predominantly associated with the youth movement, rather than the older generation suggested by the dress name. It tended to be associated with both mod and hippie groups. The granny dress offered an alternative to mini dresses and was a symbol of rebellion. Girls talked about it taking "nerve" to wear such an old-fashioned style.

Granny dresses are most often associated with the designer Laura Ashley, who started selling these dresses to women in the Welsh countryside in the late 1950s. The trend made it to the United States where it was embraced in California and then moved eastward. Granny dress parties and dances were held.

One account credits the creation of the dress to designer George Wilner, who worked at Mr. Aref of California. Wilner based his design on a calico dress that a retailer from Glendale showed him. Wilner adapted the calico dress design to be more of an empire-style, similar to dresses worn by Empress Josephine. An article describing the "new craze" credited the origin to Los Angeles.

An apocryphal story about the origin of the dress was that it came into fashion after a dancer was told by a television disc jockey that her dress was too short. In response, the dancer found a floor-length dress to wear and started a fashion craze. Another apocryphal origin story had an old woman wearing such a dress on a tour of "night spots" in Los Angeles. The woman's youthful vigour "attracted attention" and a designer, believing her style of dress helped her stay active, copied her dress design.

Granny dresses have also been popular in various regions in Egypt in the 1980s.

In the 1990s, there was a brief resurgence of the dress concurrent with the popularity of grunge. This time, granny dresses were considered to be any kind of loose-fitting frock and could be paired with nearly any accessory.

== Controversy ==
In the past, there were instances where students wearing granny dresses to school were suspended or sent home. For example, in Oakland in 1965, girls were sent home for wearing granny dresses that were deemed too long. In Kansas City, Missouri, a mother even wore her own granny dress to school in an attempt to convince the principal to allow her daughter to wear one after the dress was banned.

In Trumansburg, New York, in 1966, three sisters were suspended from school for wearing the dress. In response to this suspension, the school's attorney claimed that both safety and possible class disruption were the reasons the dress was banned. The school attorney felt that granny dresses were "extreme" and may encourage students to adopt other extreme forms of dressing. The principal of the school also felt that there was a danger of tripping on stairs because the length of the dresses was too long.

Laura M. Lorraine, the dean of Analy Union High School, also believed that the length of the dresses would make it difficult to walk up stairs. In some cases, school authorities just stated that it wasn't "suitable school attire."

In 1966, a Dear Abby column featured a letter from a girl who was sent to the principal's office for wearing a granny dress.
