= Lingerie dress =

Early 20th century garment

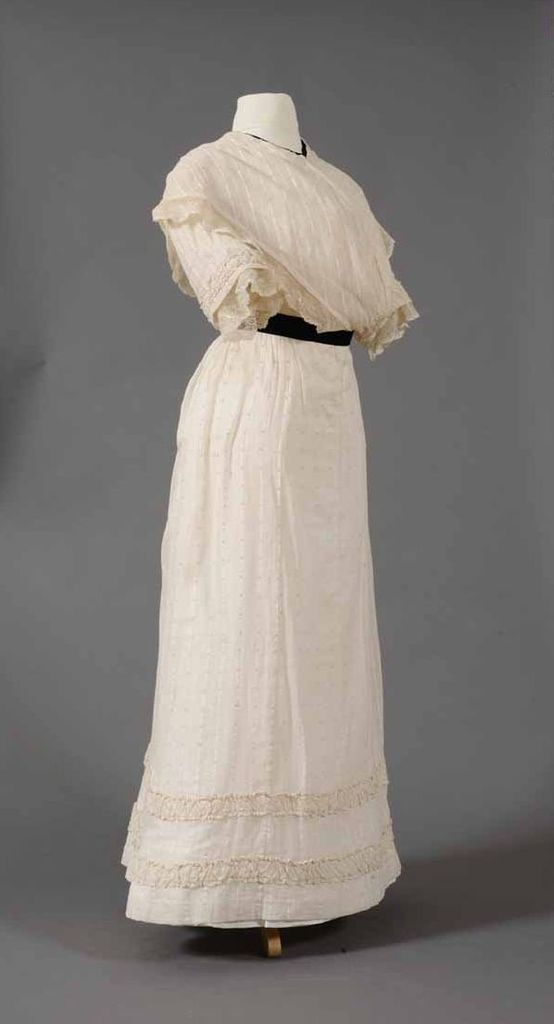
c. 1904.

A lingerie dress was a popular type of dress in the North America and Europe throughout the decades of the 1900s until 1920. The dress was lightweight, often white and decorated. It was especially popular as an outdoor dress and for summer.

== Overview ==
Lingerie dresses were heavily decorated and designed to look like a Regency era chemise gown. The dresses featured full skirts, blouses and sleeves of varying lengths. They were most often white, but not always. The dresses could also be worn over different colored gowns or slips, expanding a woman's wardrobe. The dresses were named "lingerie" in order to emphasize the lightness and thinness of the dresses, not to suggest lingerie as an undergarment. The more sheer the lingerie dress, the better. The dresses were made of various fabrics, including linen, cotton or silk and parts of the dress were see-through to reveal the slip or gown worn underneath.

Lingerie dresses were worn by various classes of women in North America and Europe in the decades of the 1900s up to the 1920. They were often worn at outdoor activities and were touted as being appropriate for warm weather. They were also easier to wash than other kinds of dresses. In addition, they were praised for their simplicity which also implied that they were less costly than other types of dresses.

The dresses could be bought ready-made or created at home by pattern. They could be accessorized with collars, laces and bows on the neck. Other accessories included lingerie hats and parasols. Dresses were embellished with lace and embroidery, including eyelet embroidery.
