= Dress =

Garment consisting of a bodice and skirt made in one or more pieces

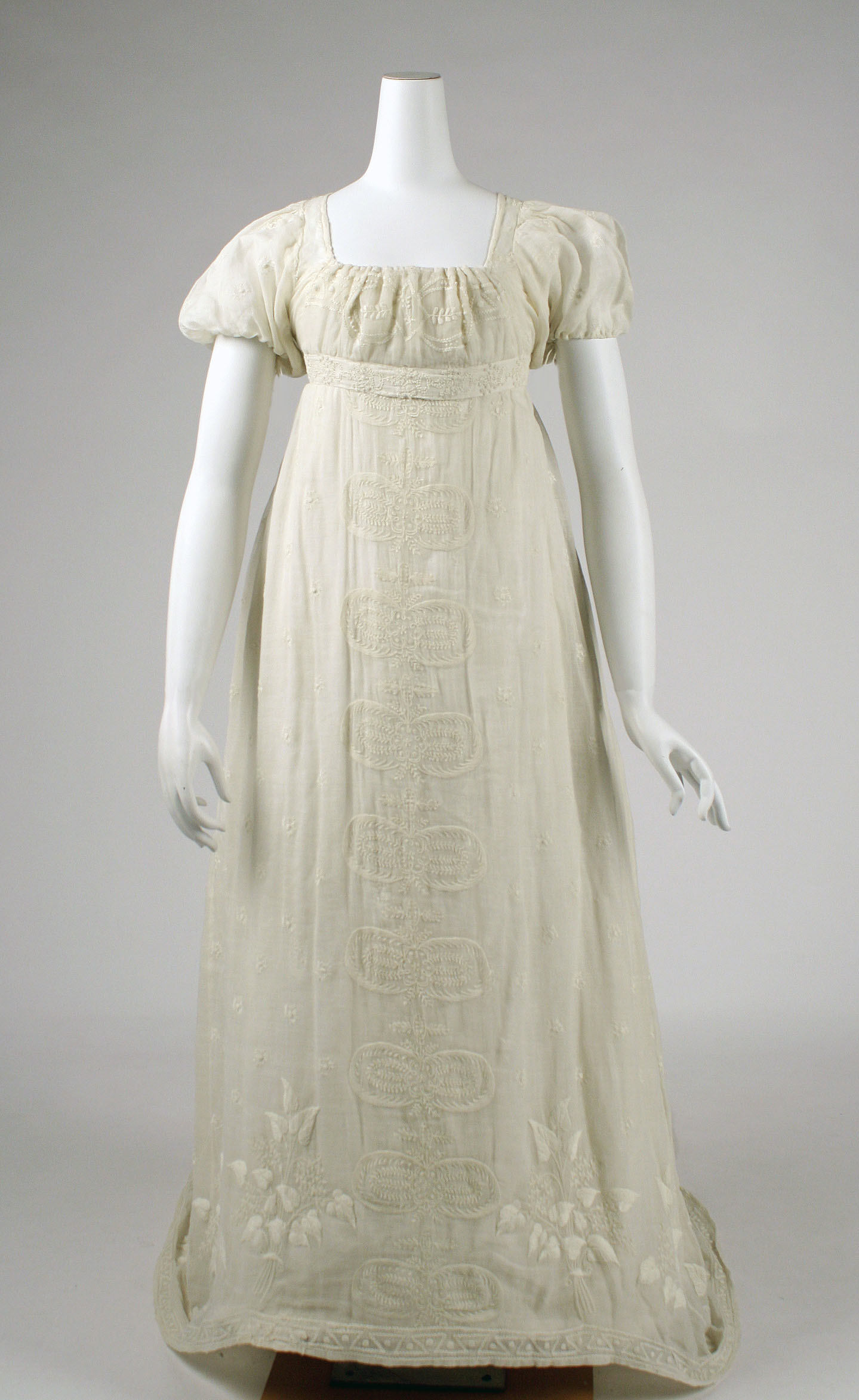
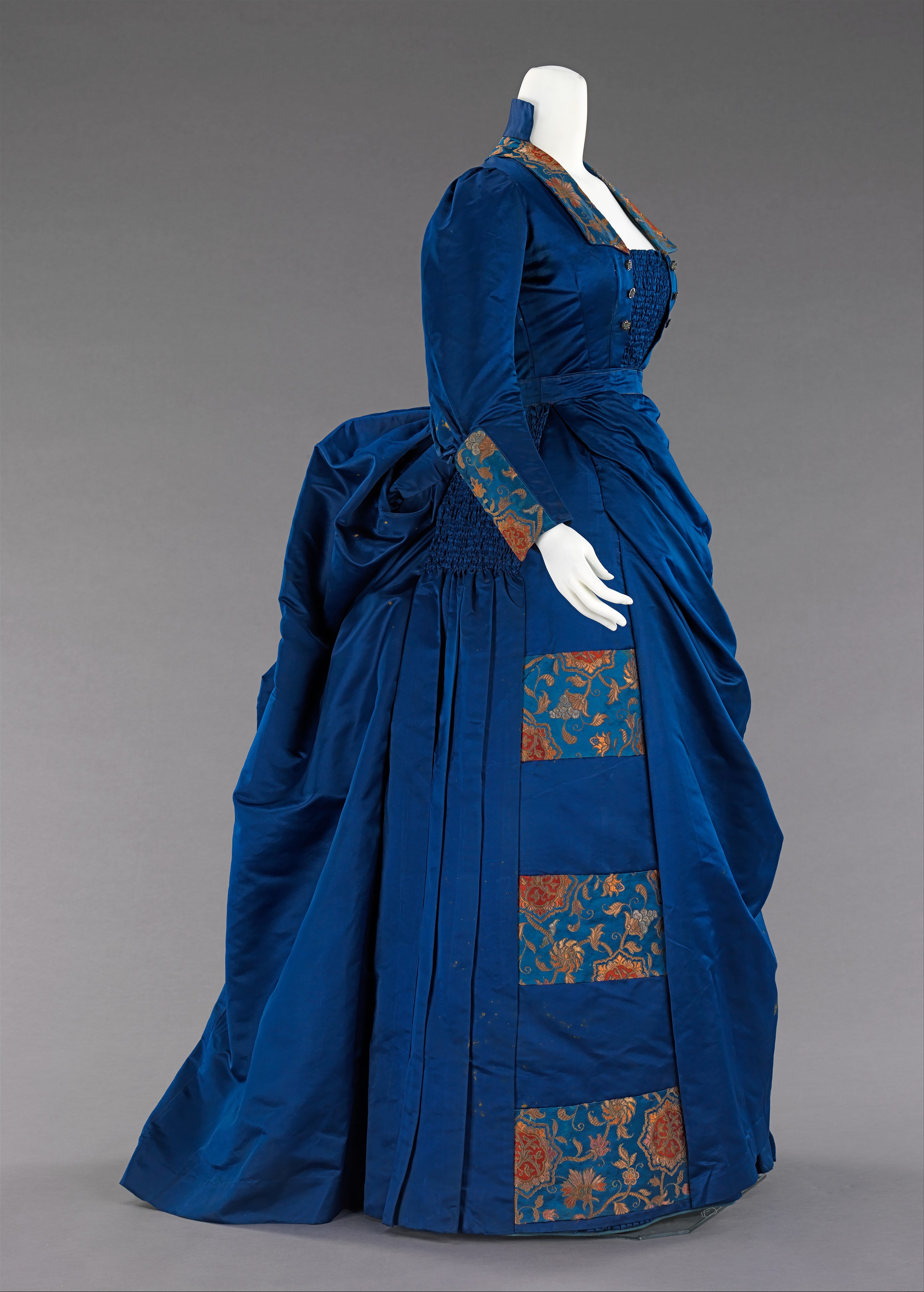
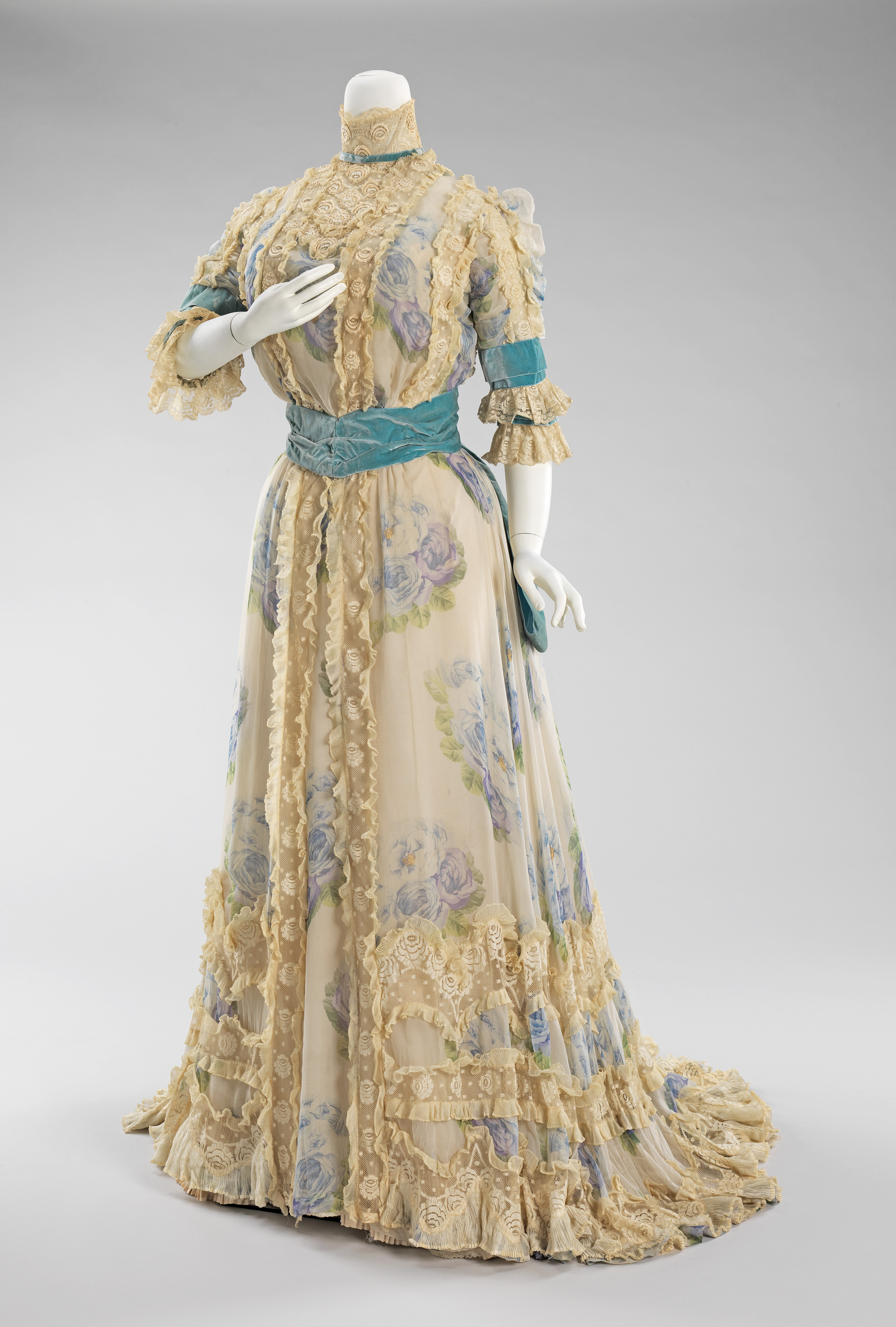
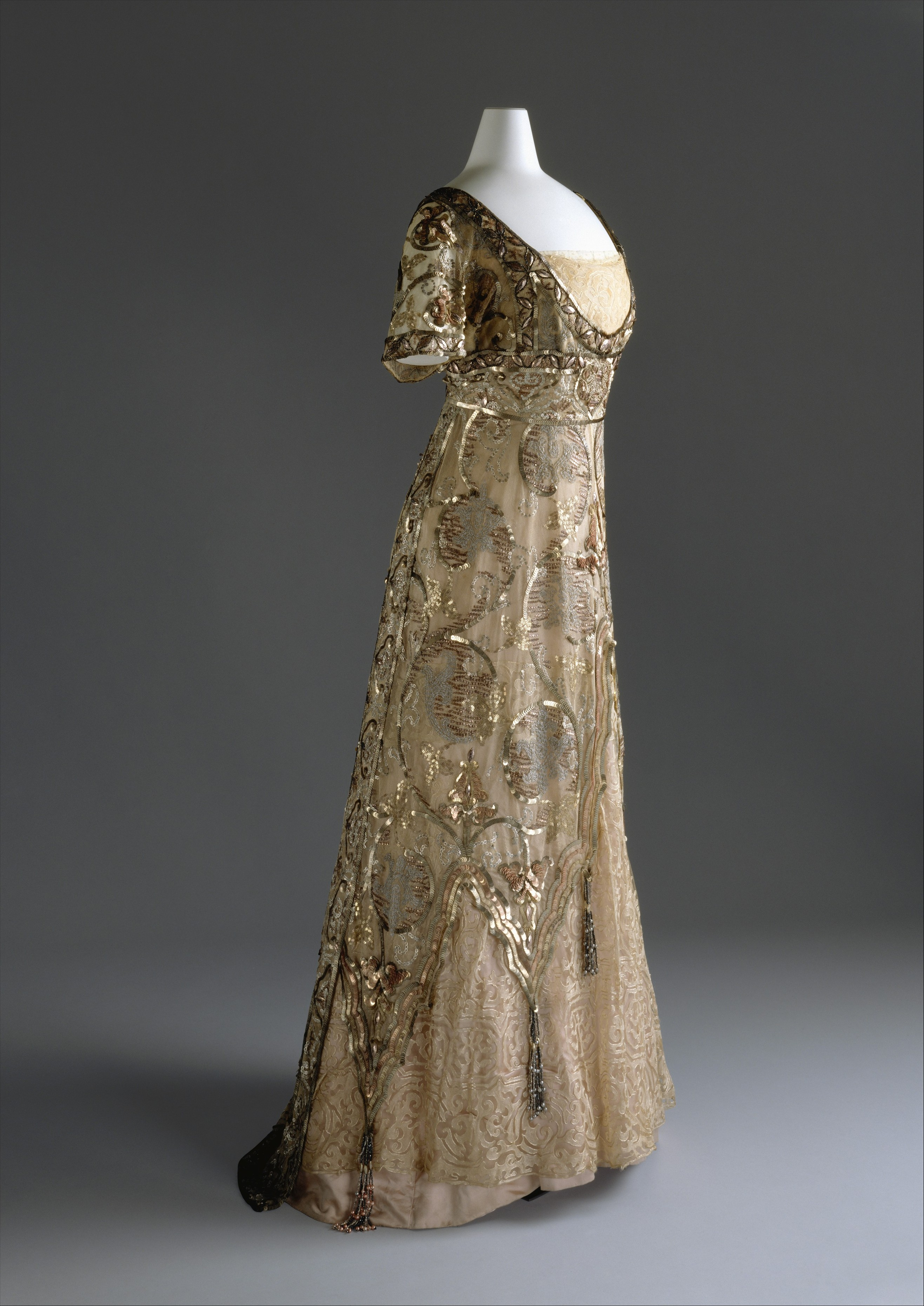
Examples of dresses

A dress (also known as a frock or a gown) is a one-piece outer garment that is worn on the torso, hanging down over the legs. Dresses often consist of a bodice attached to a skirt.

Dress shapes, silhouettes, textiles, and colors vary. In particular, dresses can vary by sleeve length, neckline, skirt length, or hemline. These variances may be based on considerations such as fashion trends, modesty, weather, and personal taste. Dresses are generally suitable for both formal wear and casual wear.

Historically, foundation garments and other structural garments—including items such as corsets, partlets, petticoats, panniers, and bustles—were used to achieve the desired silhouette.

== History ==
=== Middle Ages ===
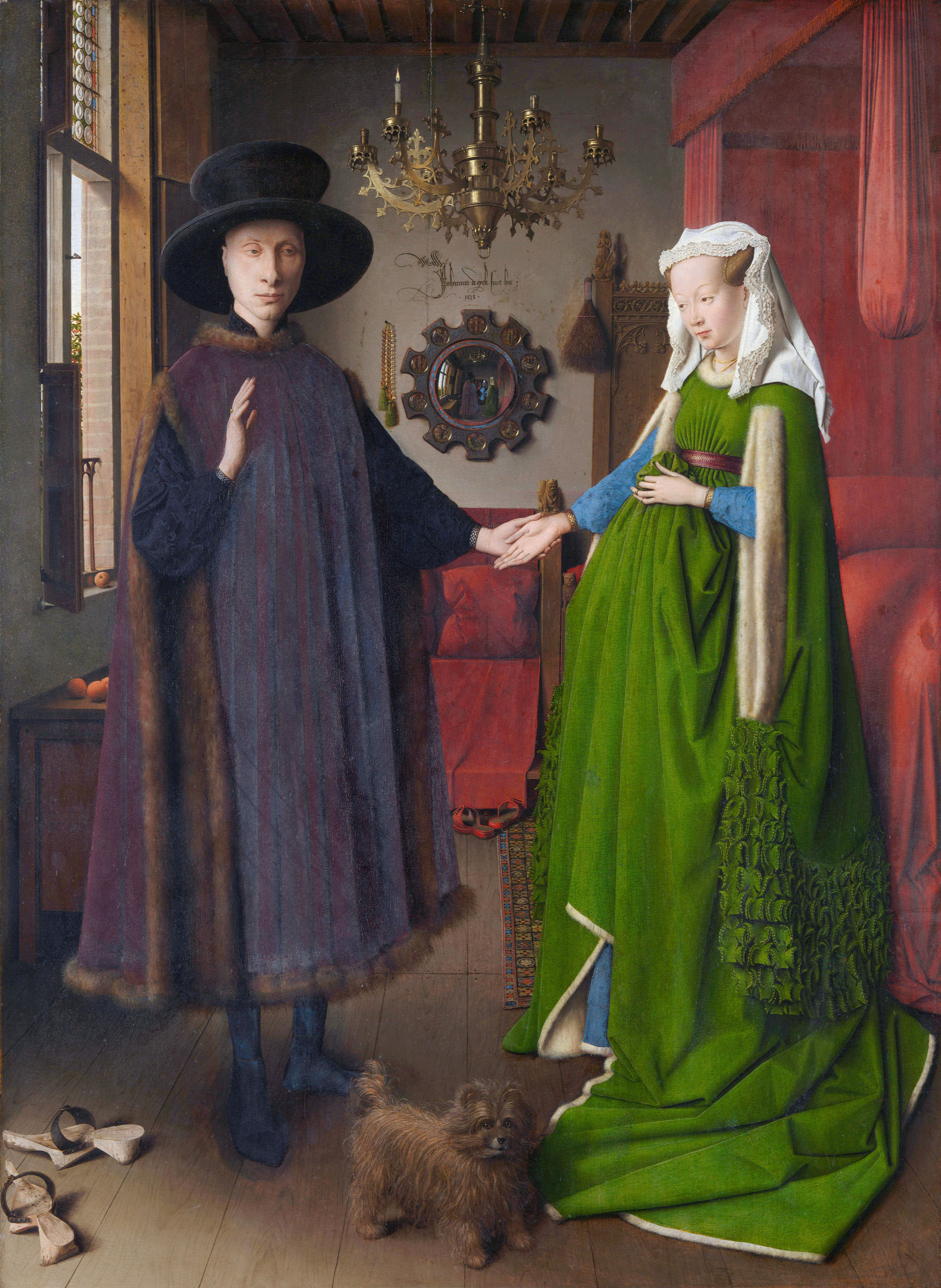
Houppeland (right)

In the 11th century, women in Europe wore loose garments that were similar in shape to the tunics worn by men. Sleeves varied in fit and length, and hemlines fell below the knees, most often reaching the ankle or ground. These dresses were worn over ankle-length chemise garments. As the century progressed, these dresses featured a tighter fit on the arms and upper body. The tighter fit was achieved by making slits to the waist and in the sleeves that were laced closed to fit the figure. Laces were gradually replaced by buttons. By the end of the 11th century, sleeves widened with cuffs sometimes reaching several feet in circumference. This style remained popular into the 13th century, although the sleeves once again became more fitted.

In the 13th and 14th centuries, a similar dress known as a cote-hardie came into fashion. This garment was closed down the front of the bodice with buttons that extended to the hip; this resulted in a dress that was more fitted through the hip rather than just to the waist. These dresses also often featured decorative elements such as long strips of cloth around the elbow known as tippets.

In the 15th century, houppelandes and gowns became popular. Houppelandes were full-cut, floor-length dresses with high collars and full sleeves. Gowns were also long dresses, but they had open necklines, a closer-fitted bodice, and sleeves that became more fitted as the century progressed. Both houppelandes and gowns were often belted just below the bust.

=== 16th century ===
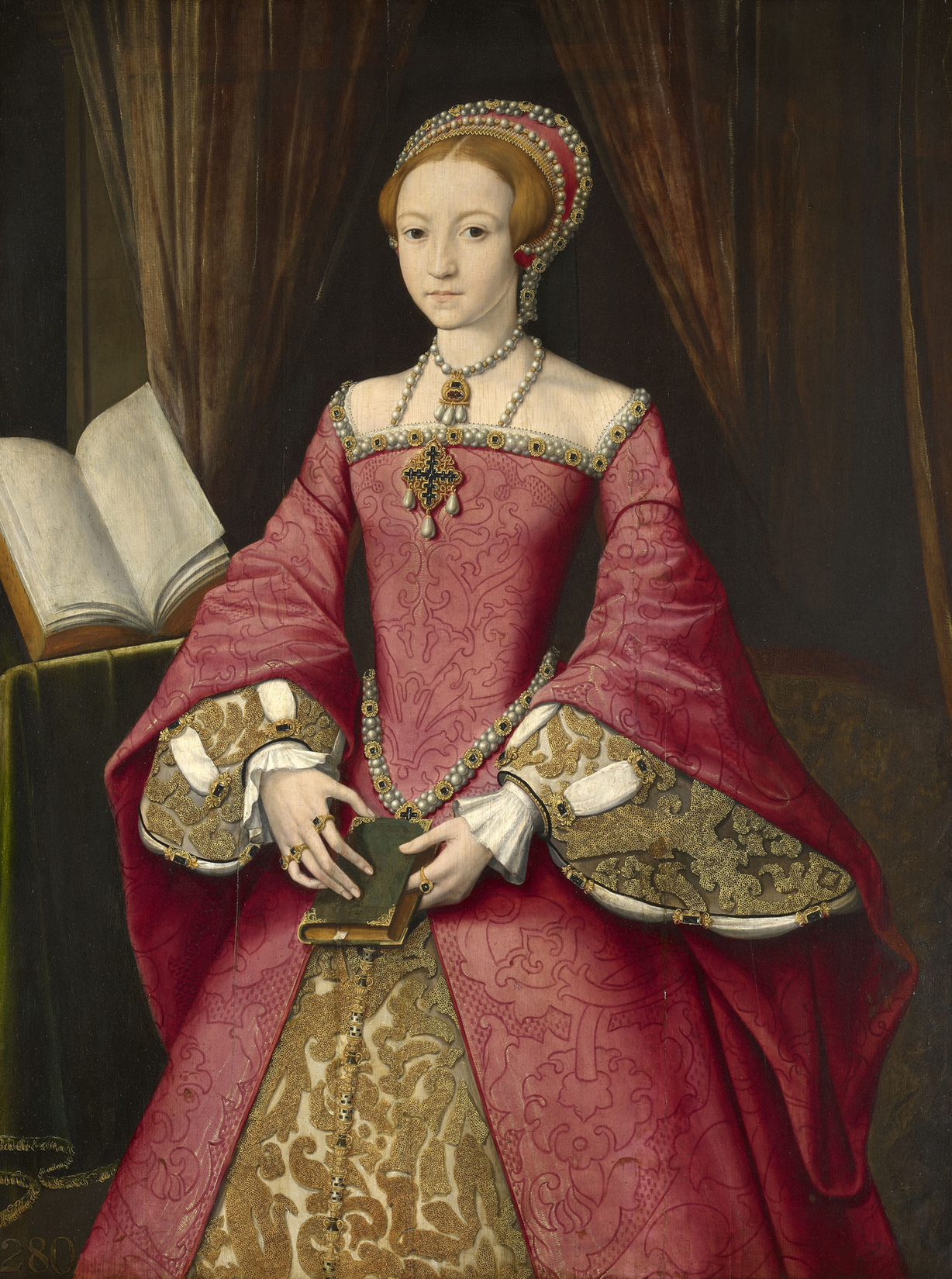
Spanish farthingale silhouette

European dresses in at the start of the 16th century resembled those of the previous century: full-cut, belted gowns with large sleeve openings worn over a kirtle or petticoat and chemise. Decorative treatments such as pinking, slashing, and blackwork embroidery became increasingly common. Necklines were initially low and broad, but wearers began to fill in the open space with high collared chemises or partlets. Although the overall style of dress was fairly consistent across the continent, there were regional differences often involving sleeve shape and decorative elements. European courts, such as Tudor court and the wives of Henry VIII, were influential in European fashion. From the 1540s, the bodices of dresses were stiffened, flattening the wearer's chest, and skirts were shaped with a Spanish farthingale. The resulting silhouette resembled two triangles.

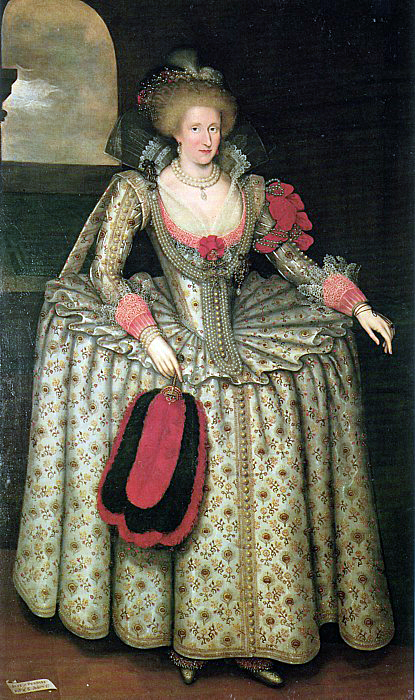
Wheel farthingale silhouette

From the 1550s, middle- and upper-class European women could choose between the still popular rigid farthingale style or a looser-style gown known as a ropa. The ropa style of dress was known by different names throughout Europe, including sumarra (Italy), marlotte (France), and vlieger (Holland). Fashionable sleeves were often more fitted with puffs at the shoulder. From the 1570s, dress became even more highly decorated, exaggerated, and rigid. The previously popular conical skirt shape achieved with a Spanish farthingale was replaced by the wider, more conical wheel farthingale. Under Queen Elizabeth, sumptuary laws dictated what people of different social rank were allowed to wear.

Women's dresses in Russia during the 16th and 17th centuries identified the wearer's place in society or their family.

=== 17th century ===
Holland, as a center of textile production, was a particularly noted area of innovation in dress fashion during the 17th Century. In Spain and Portugal, women wore stomachers while in England and France, dresses became more "naturally" shaped. Lace and slashing were popular decorations. Skirts were full, with regular folds and the overskirt allowed the display of an underskirt of contrasting fabric. Necklines became lower as well. Embroidery that reflected scientific discoveries, such as newly discovered animals and plants were popular. In the British Colonies, multi-piece dresses were also popular, though less luxurious. Wealthy women living in the Spanish or Dutch colonies in the Americas copied the fashions that were popular from their homelands.

The three-piece dress, which had a bodice, petticoat and gown, was popular until the last 25 years of the century, in which the mantua, or a one-piece gown, became more popular. Corsets became more important in dresses by the 1680s.

Working women, and women in slavery in the Americas, used simple patterns to create shifts, wool or linen petticoats and gowns and cotton dresses. The bottoms of the skirts could be tucked into the waistband when a woman was near a cooking or heating fire.

=== 18th century ===
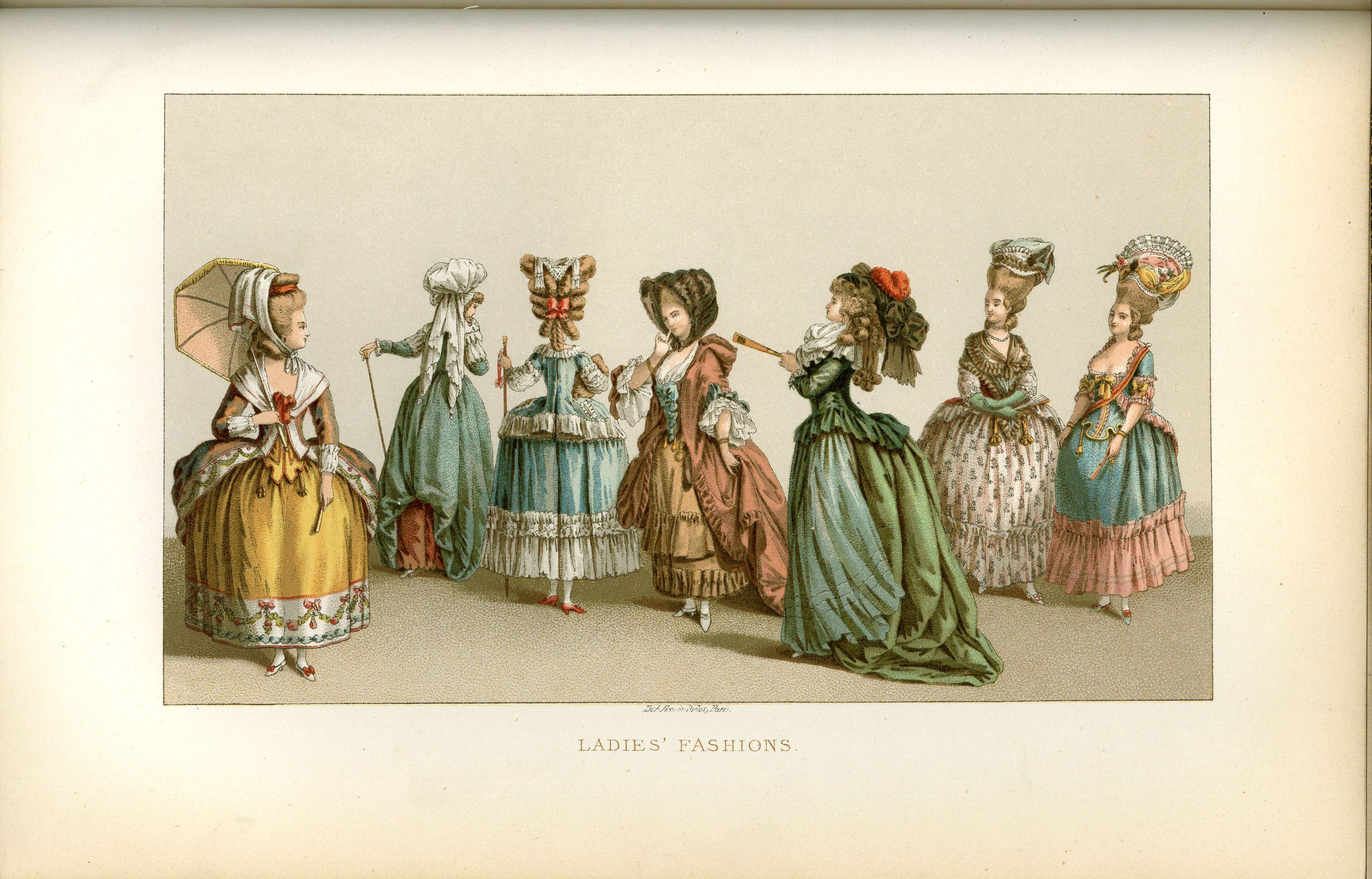
Illustration of 18th century French women

Large, triangular silhouettes were favored during the 18th century, skirts were wide and supported by hoop underskirts. One-piece gowns remained popular until the middle of the century. During the 1760s in France, hoop petticoats were reduced in size. Lighter colors and lighter fabrics were also favored. In Colonial America, women most often wore a gown and petticoat, in which the skirt of the gown opened to reveal the petticoat underneath. Women also had riding habits which consisted of the petticoat, jacket and a waistcoat.

French fashion regarding dresses became very fast-changing during the later part of the 18th century. Throughout this period, the length of fashionable dresses varied only slightly, between ankle-length and floor-sweeping. Between 1740 and 1770, the robe à la française was very popular with upper-class women. In France, the Empire style became popular after the French Revolution. This simpler style was also favored by Josephine Bonaparte, wife of Napoleon. Other popular styles during the revolution included tunic dresses and the negligée à la patriot, which featured the red, white and blue colors of the flag.

=== 19th century ===
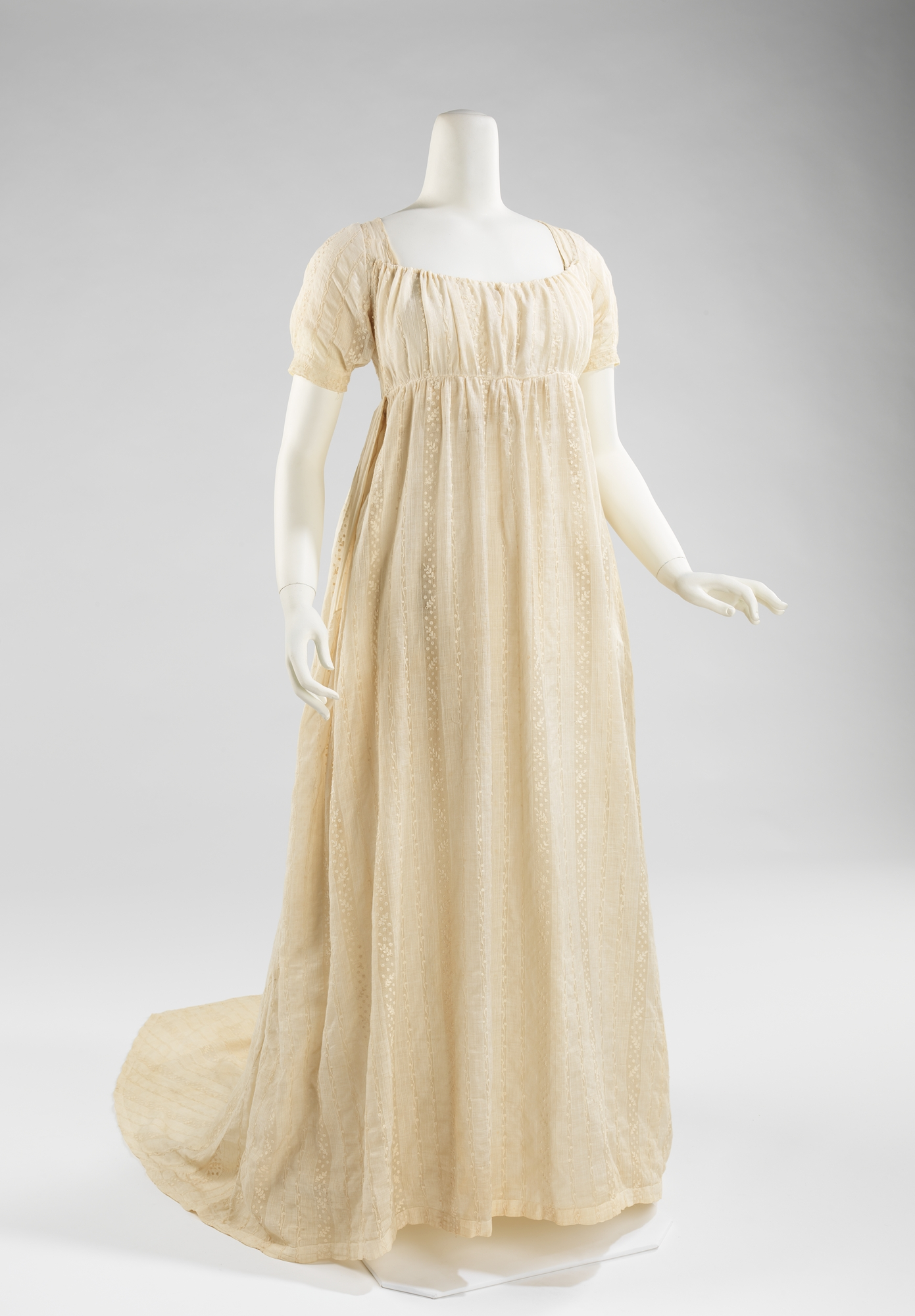
Empire dress, 1800–1805, cotton and linen, Metropolitan Museum of Art (New York City)

Women's dresses in the 19th century began to be classified by the time of day or purpose of the dress. High-waisted dresses were popular until around 1830.

Early nineteenth century dresses in Russia were influenced by Classicism and were made of thin fabrics, with some semi-transparent. Elizabeth Vigée Le Brun wore these types of dresses with a short skirt (reaching to her ankles) when she lived in Russia between 1785 and 1801 and many Russian women copied her style. By the 1840s, Russian women were turning to what was in fashion in Europe.

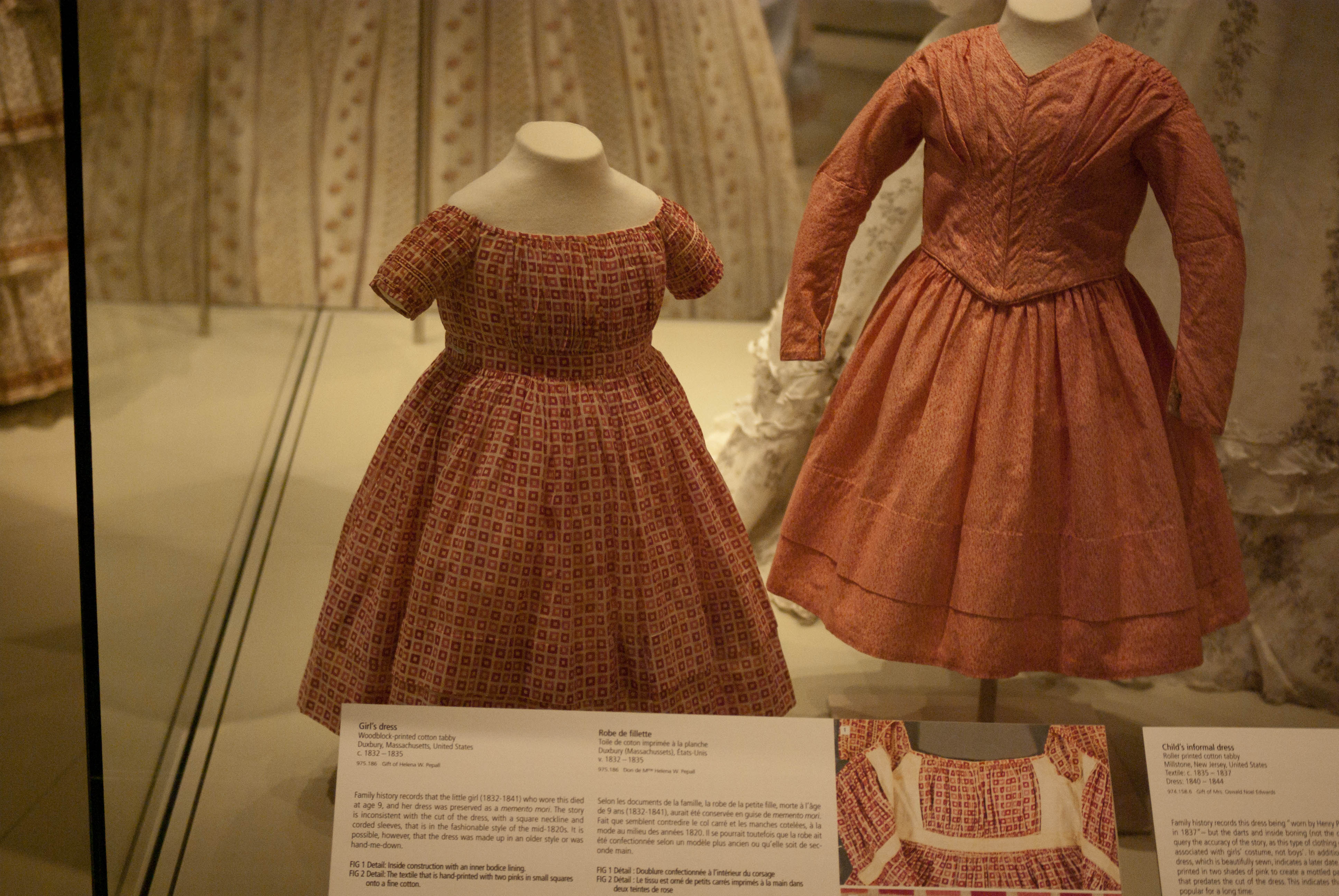
19th century dresses.

Europeans styles in dresses increased dramatically to the hoopskirt and crinoline-supported styles of the 1860s, then fullness was draped and drawn to the back. Dresses had a "day" bodice with a high neckline and long sleeves, and an "evening" bodice with a low neckline (decollete) and very short sleeves. In Russia, metal hoopskirts were known as "malakhovs." Skirts of the 1860s were heavily decorated.

To sleep, women in the American West wore floor-length dresses of white cotton with high collars displaying decoration. Various Native American people, such as the Navajo and the Mescalero Apache began to adapt the designs of their dresses to look more like the European Americans they came in contact with. Navajo women further adapted the European designs, incorporating their own sense of beauty, "creating hózhó."

Paper sewing patterns for women to sew their own dresses started to be readily available in the 1860s, when the Butterick Publishing Company began to promote them. These patterns were graded by size, which was a new innovation.

The Victorian era's dresses were tight-fitting and decorated with pleats, rouching and frills. Women in the United States who were involved in dress reform in the 1850s found themselves the center of attention, both positive and negative. By 1881, the Rational Dress Society had formed in reaction to the restrictive dress of the era.

=== 20th century ===
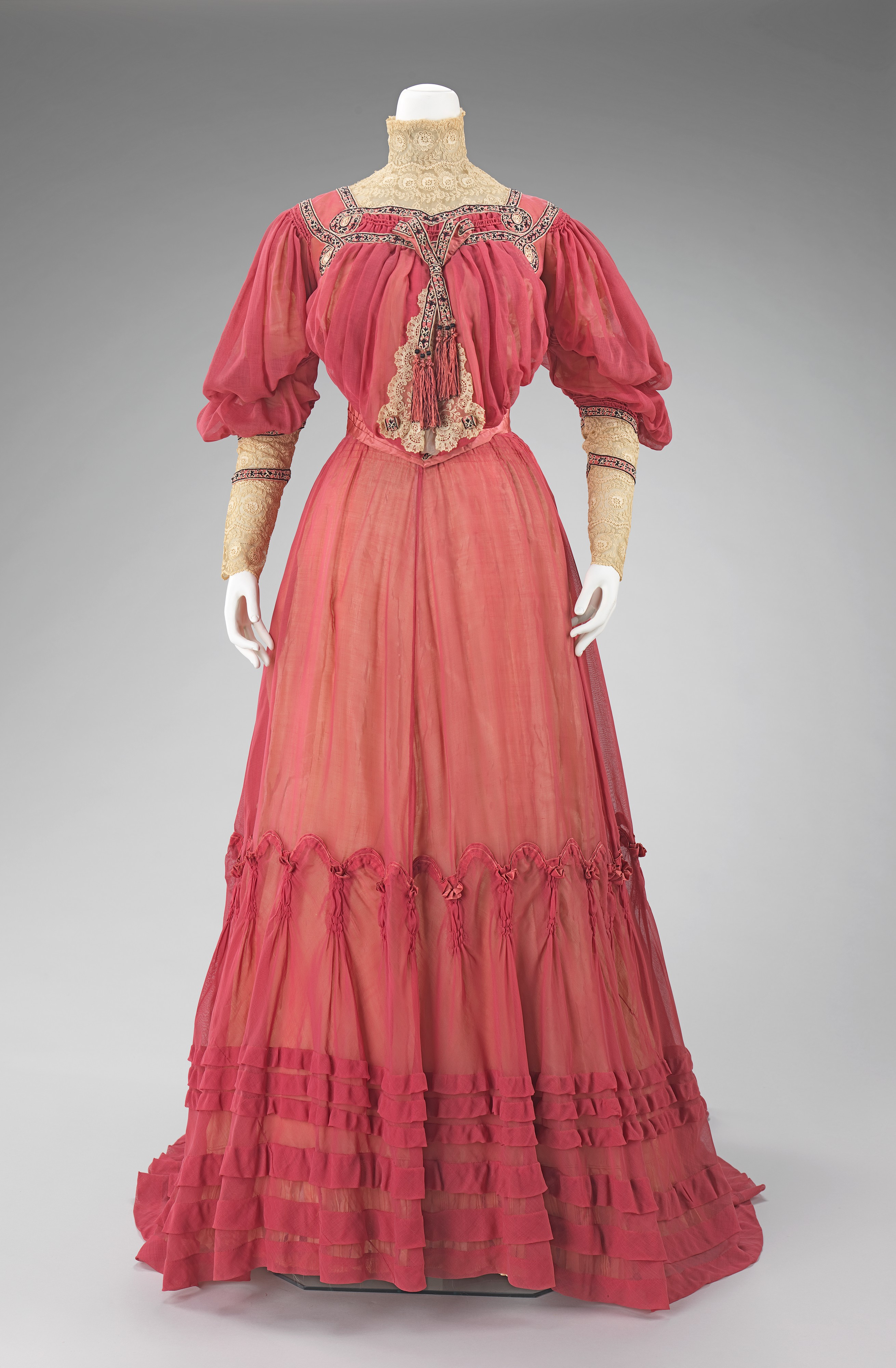
French afternoon dress, circa 1903, cotton and silk, Metropolitan Museum of Art (New York City)

In the early twentieth century, the look popularized by the Gibson Girl was fashionable. The upper part of women's dresses in the Edwardian era included a "pigeon breast" look that gave way to a corseted waist and an s-shaped silhouette. Women called their dresses "waists" if one-piece, or "shirtwaists," if it consisted of a skirt and a blouse. The bodice of the dresses had a boned lining. Informally, wealthy women wore tea gowns at home. These garments were looser, though not as loose as a "wrapper," and made of expensive fabric and laces.

By 1910, the Edwardian look was replaced with a straighter silhouette. French designer, Paul Poiret, had a large impact on the look of the time. Designs developed by Poiret were available in both boutiques and also in department stores. Popular dresses of the time were one-piece and included lingerie dresses which could be layered. At around the same time, in the United States, the American Ladies Tailors' Association developed a dress called the suffragette suit, which was practical for women to work and move around in. Another innovation of the 1910s was the ready availability of factory-made clothing.

Waistlines started out high and by 1915 were below the natural waist. By 1920, waistlines were at hip-level. Between 1910 and 1920 necklines were lower and dresses could be short-sleeved or sleeveless. Women who worked during World War I preferred shorter dresses, which eventually became the dominant style overall. In addition to the shorter dresses, waistlines were looser and the dominant colors were black, white and gray.

By 1920, the "new woman" was a trend that saw lighter fabrics and dresses that were easier to put on. Younger women were also setting the trends that older women started to follow. The dresses of the 1920s could be pulled over the head and were short and straight. It was acceptable to wear sleeveless dresses during the day. Flapper dresses were popular until end of the decade.

During World War II, dresses were slimmer and inspired by military uniforms. After WWII, the New Look, promoted by Christian Dior was very influential on fashion and the look of women's dresses for about a decade.

Since the 1970s, no one dress type or length has dominated fashion for long, with short and ankle-length styles often appearing side by side in fashion magazines and catalogs.

== Use ==
In most varieties of formal dress codes in Western cultures, a dress of an appropriate style is mandatory for women. They are also very popular for special occasions such as proms or weddings. For such occasions they, together with blouse and skirt, remain the de facto standard attire for many girls and women.

=== Formal dress ===
In western countries, a "formal" or white tie dress code typically means tailcoats for men and full-length evening dresses with opera-length gloves for women. A most formal dress for women are full-length ball or evening gowns with evening gloves. Some white tie functions also request that the women wear long gloves past the elbow.

=== Basic dress ===
A basic dress is a usually dark-colored dress of simple design which can be worn with various accessories to suit different occasions. Different kinds of jewelry, belts, scarves, and jackets can be worn with the basic dress to dress up or down.

=== Bodycon dress ===
A bodycon dress is a tight figure-hugging dress, often made from stretchy material. The name derives from "body confidence" or, originally, "body-conscious", transformed into Japanese in the 1980s as "bodikon".

=== Party dress ===
A party dress is a dress worn especially for a party. One classic style of party dress for women in modern society is the little black dress.

== Types of dresses ==
=== Time period ===
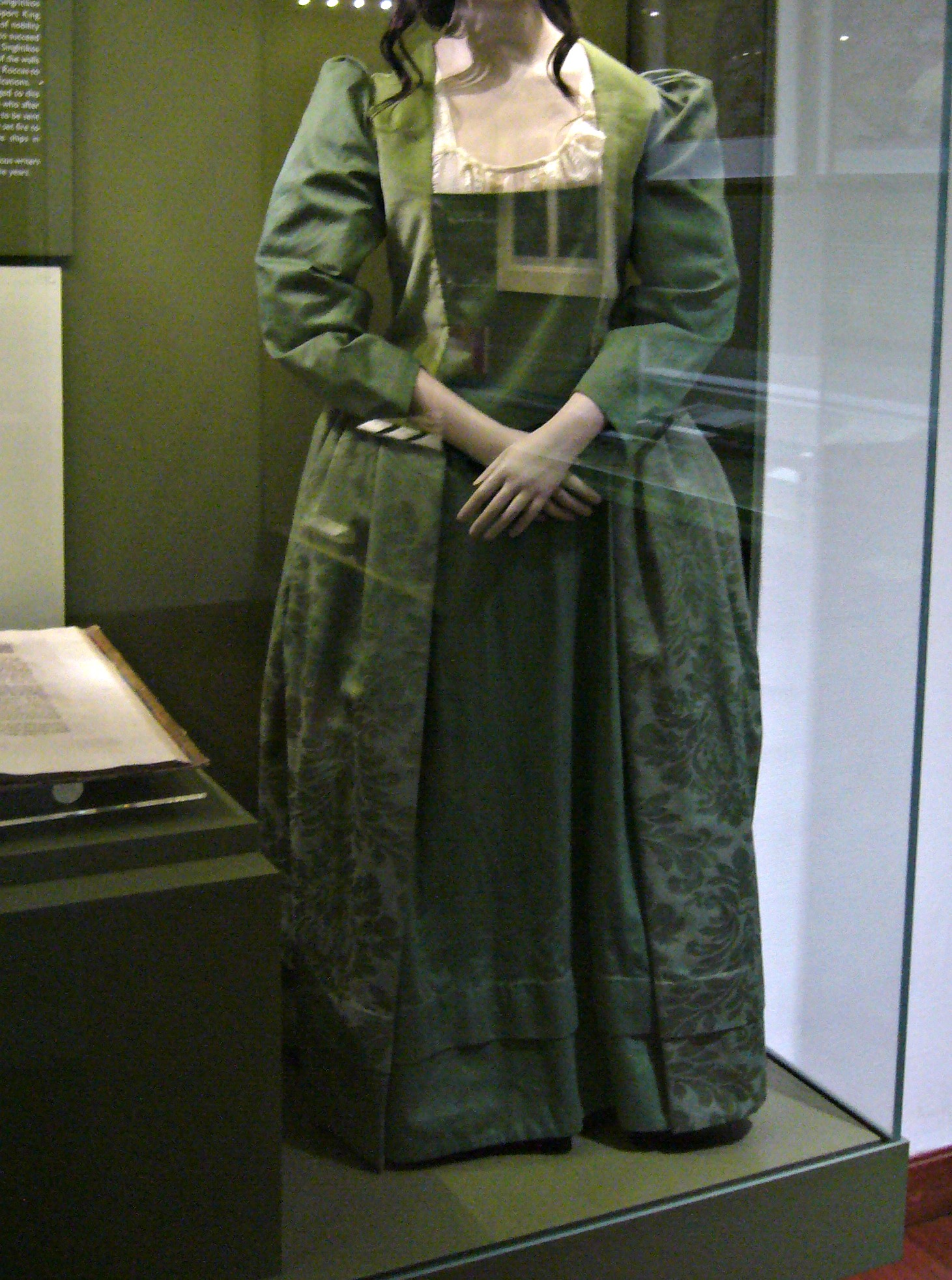
16th century dress

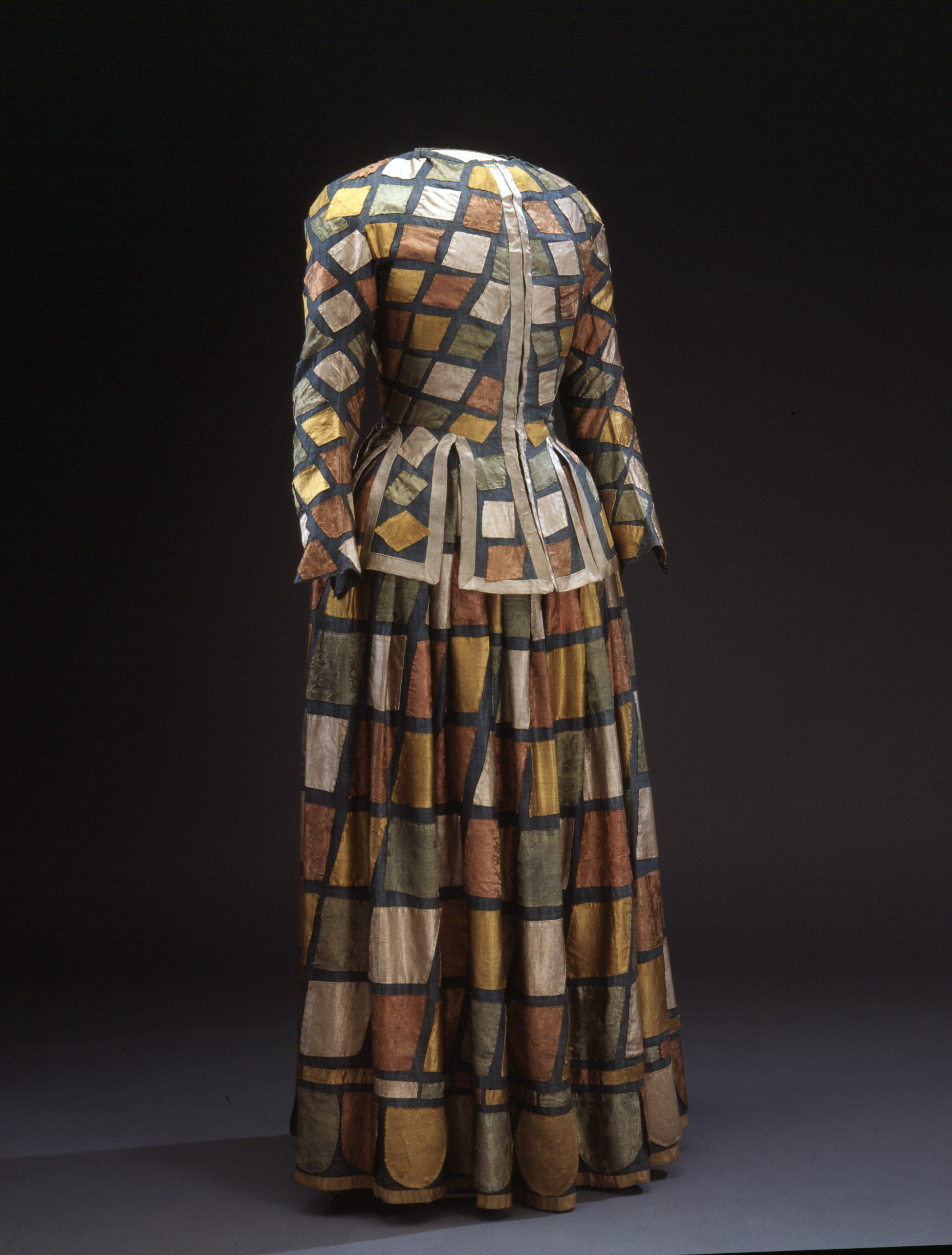
Calico dress, c. 1656–1693

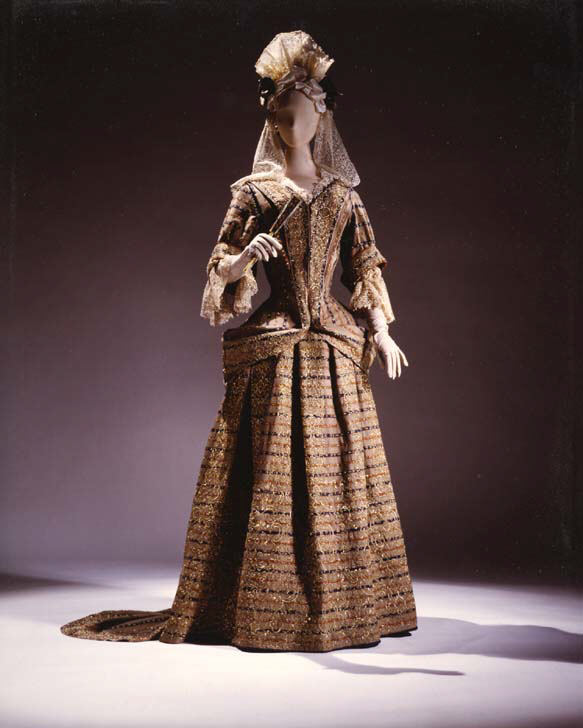
Late 17th century, wool and metallic thread

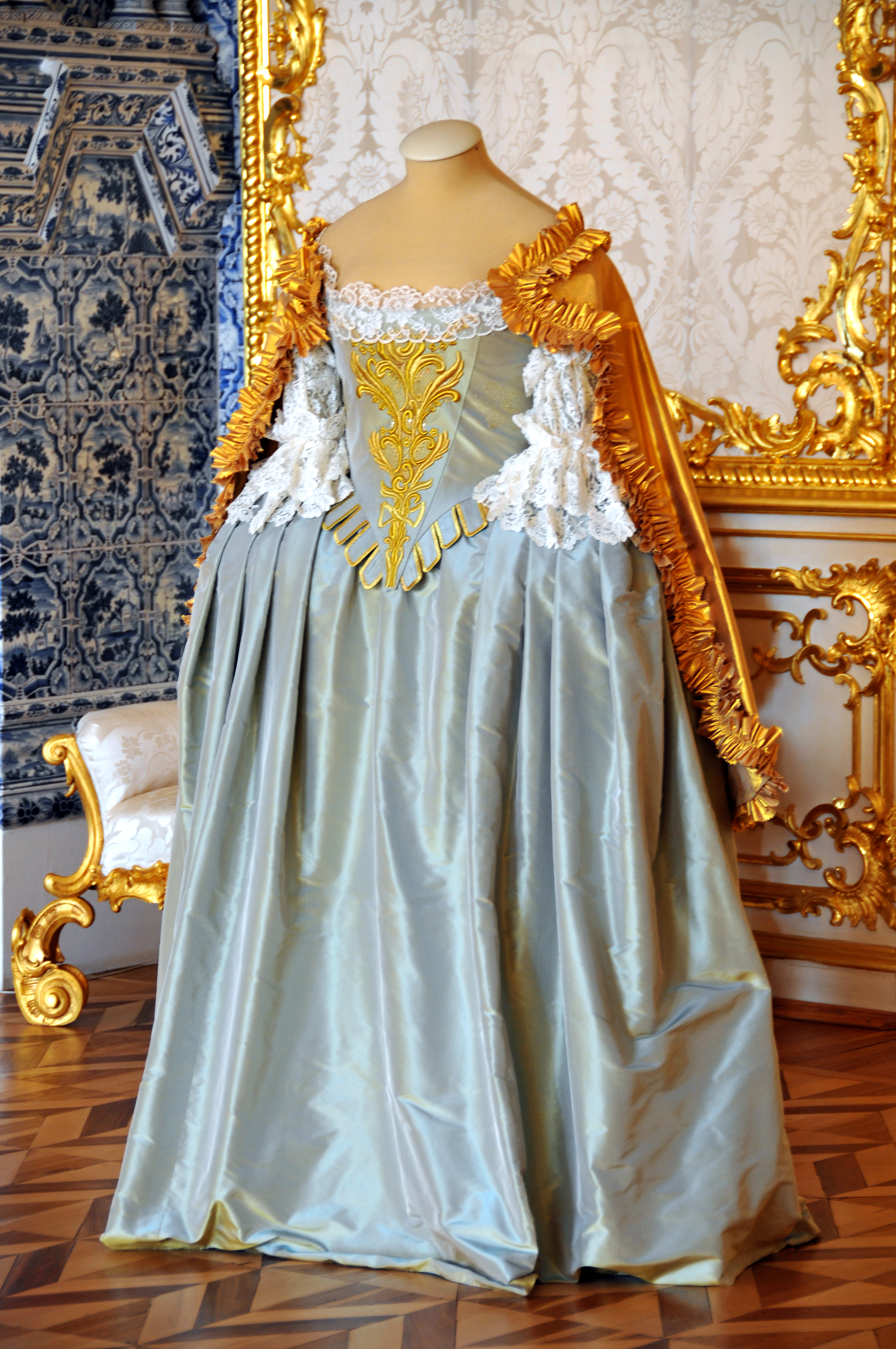
Russian dress, 1717

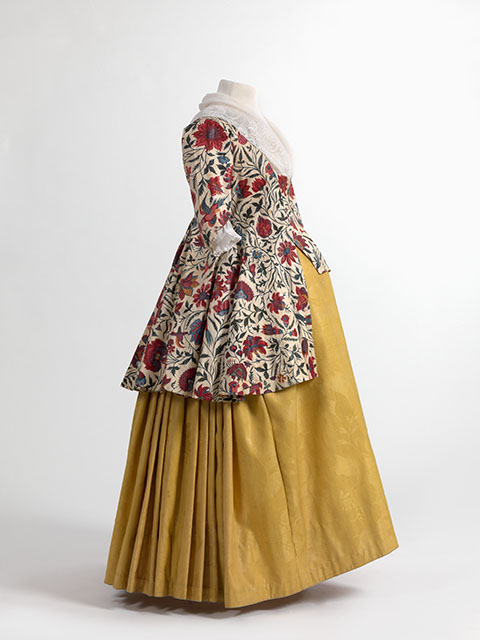
Dress c. 1750–1800, wool and chintz

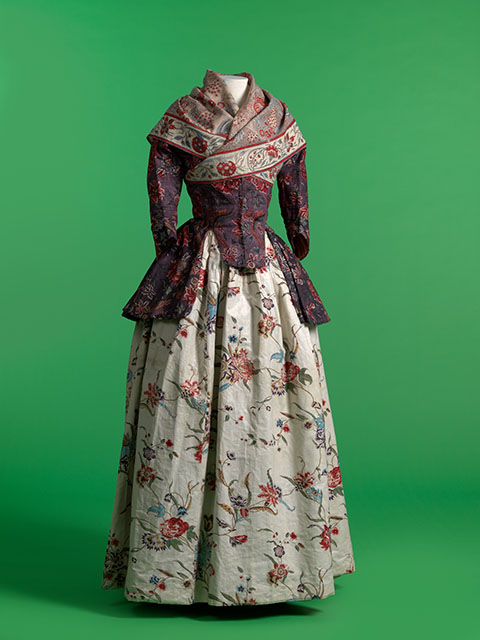
Dress c. 1770–1800, chintz and printed cotton

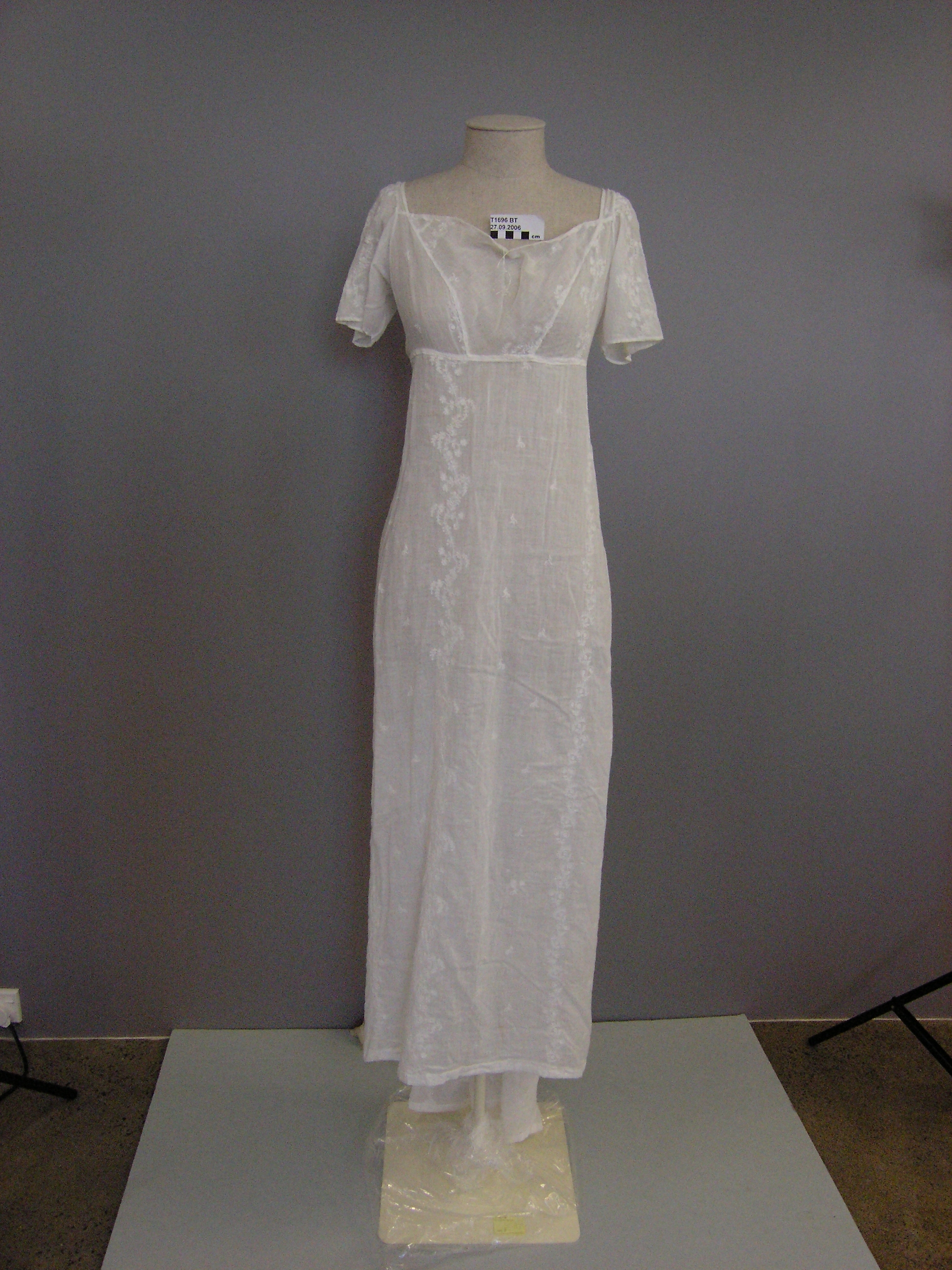
Classic empire line gown, muslin with tambour, c. 1805

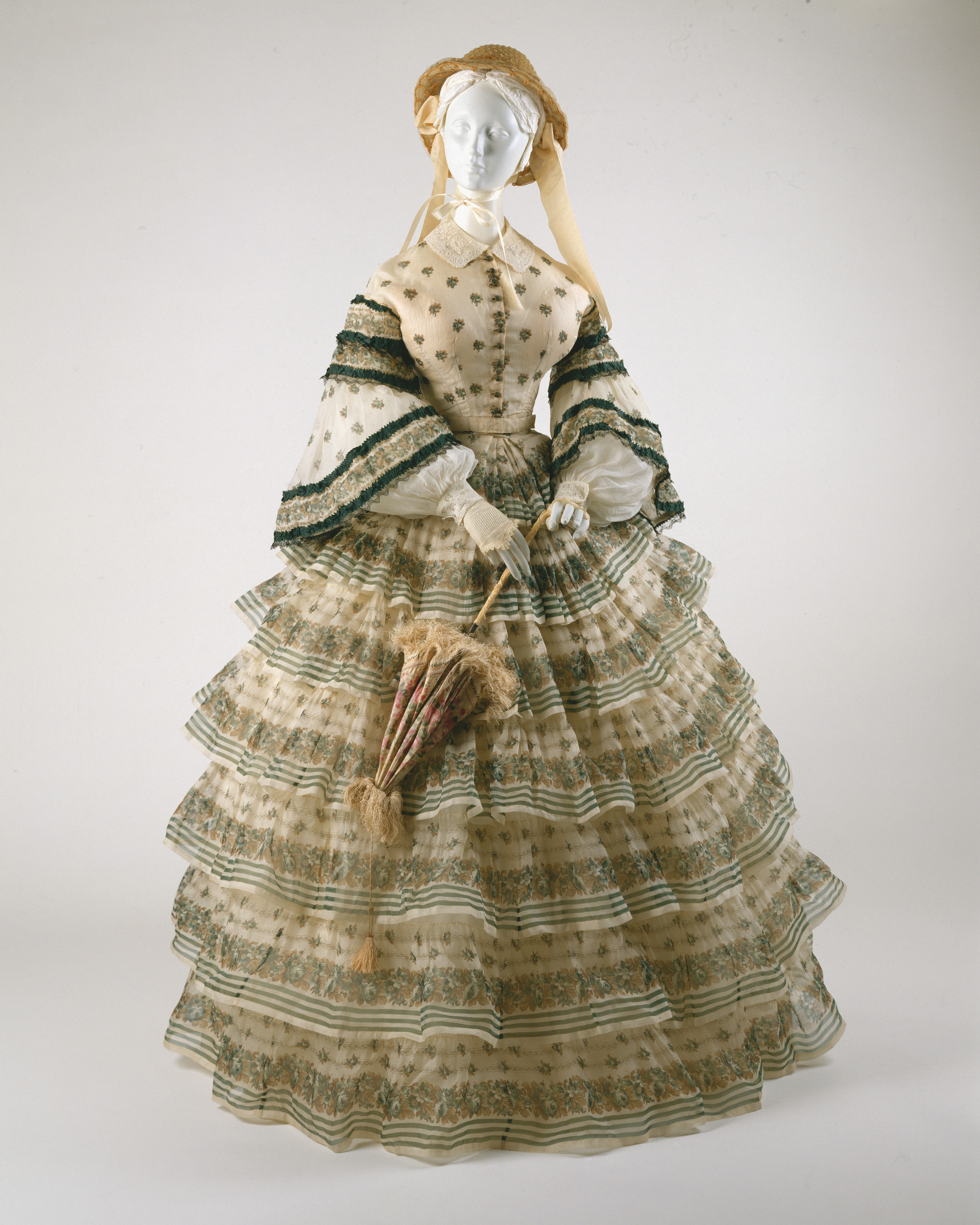
Dress and outfit, c. 1855

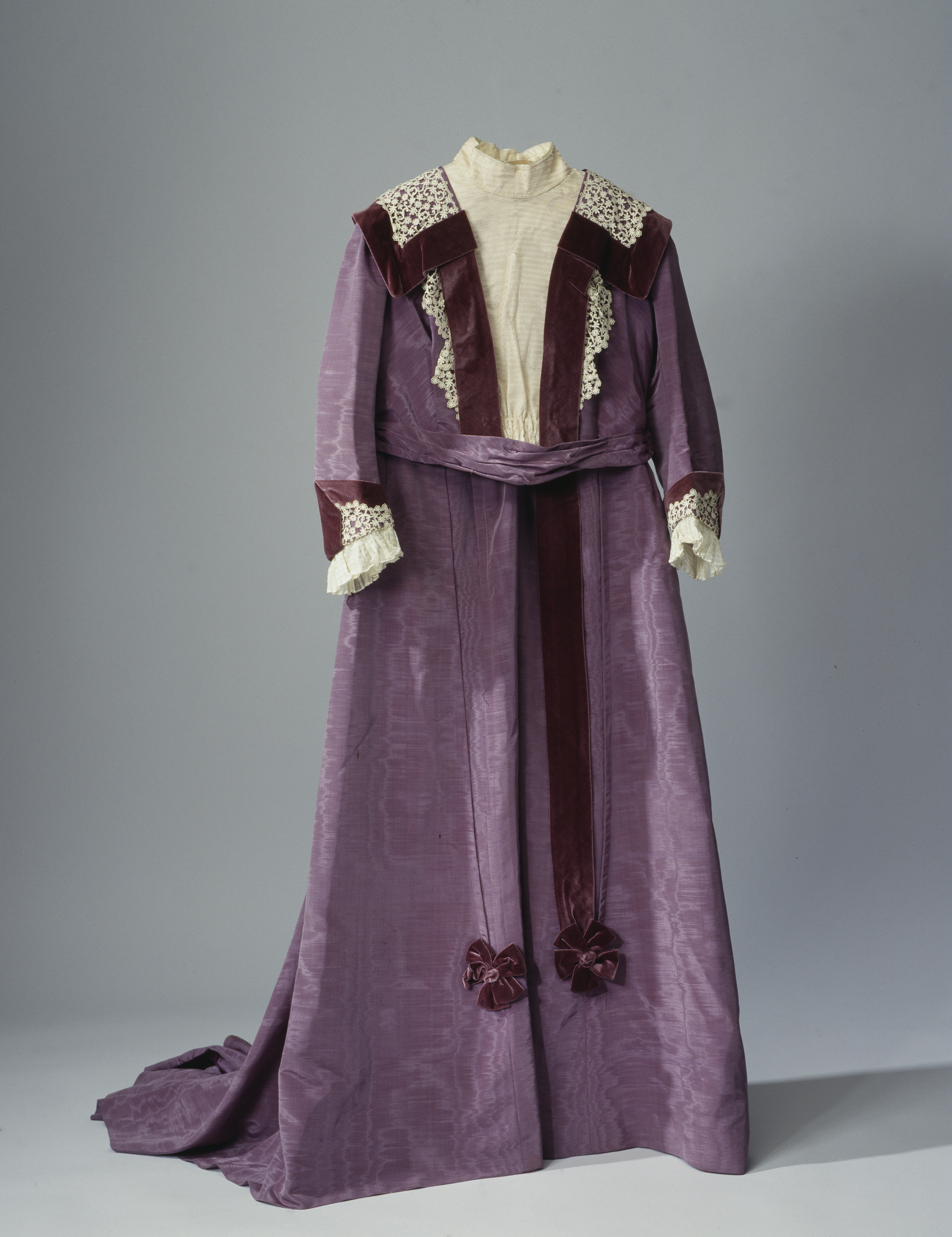
Late 19th century

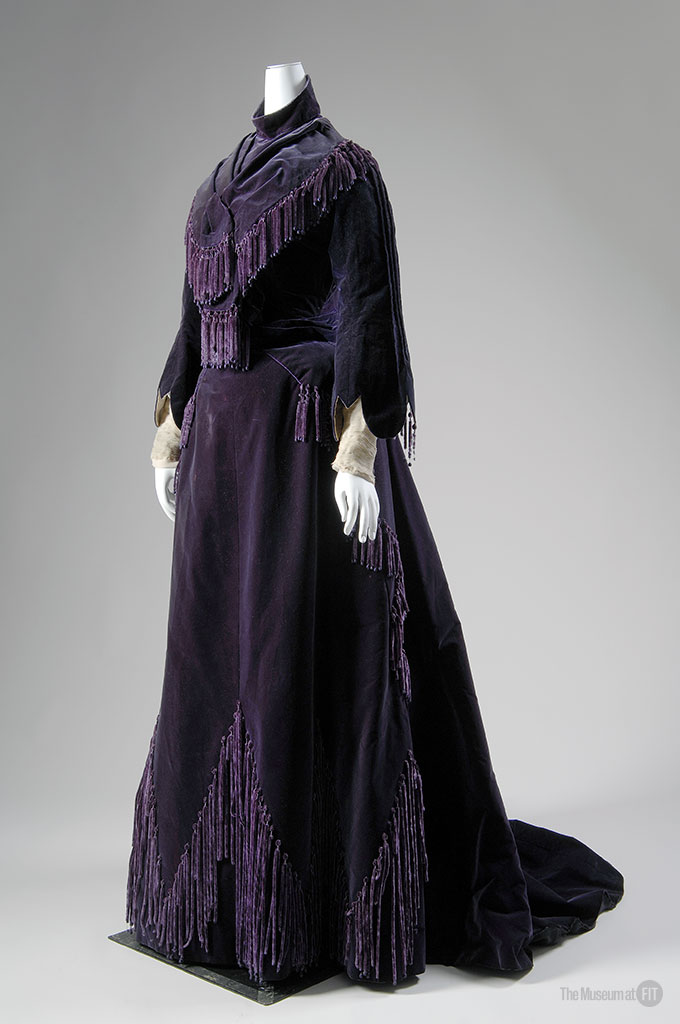
Silk velvet, chenille and chiffon created by Jean-Philippe Worth, 1903

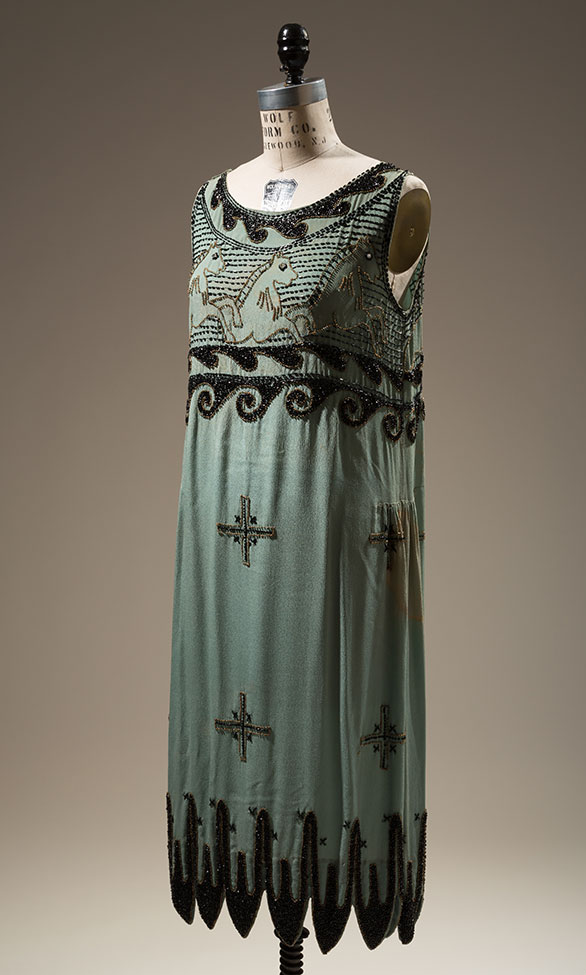
Rayon with seed beads, c. 1925

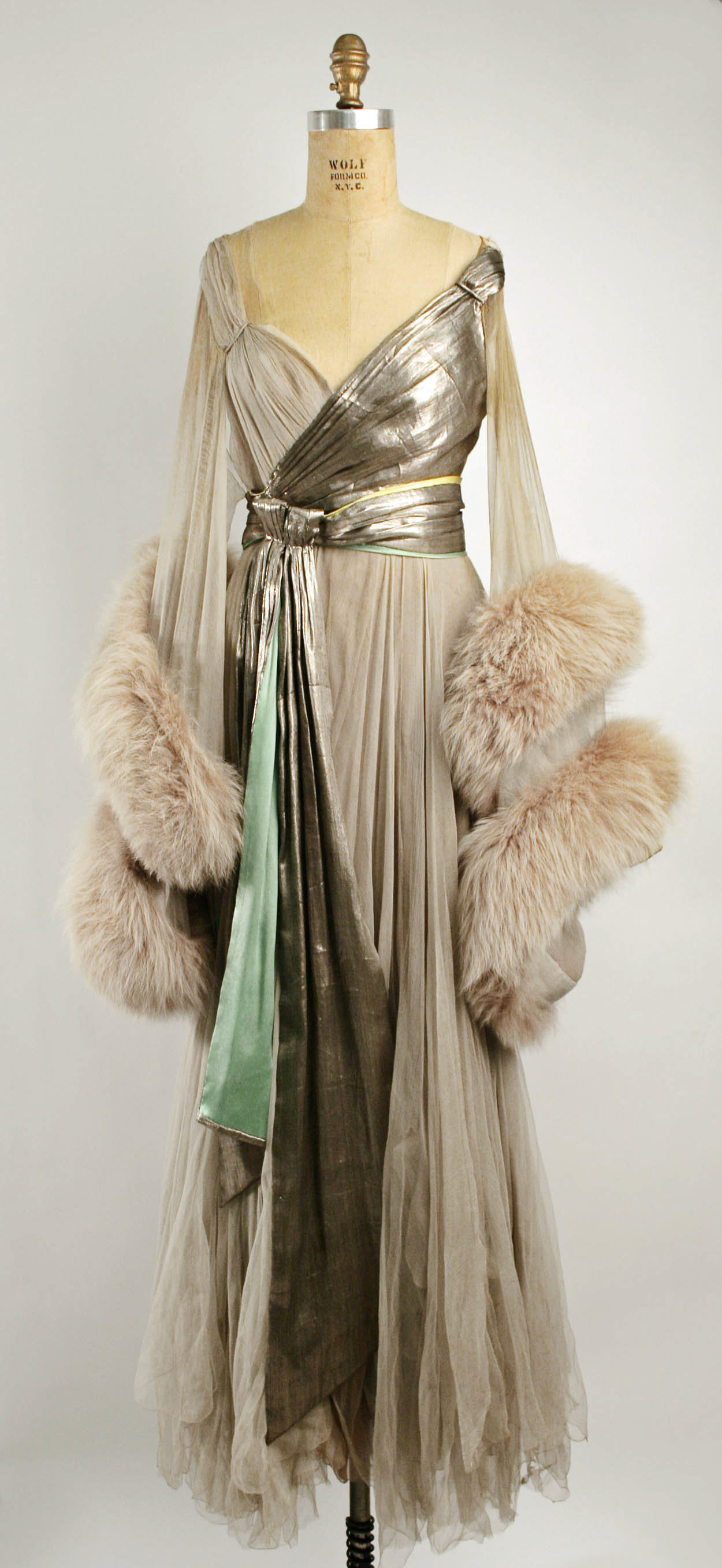
Dance dress, 1939

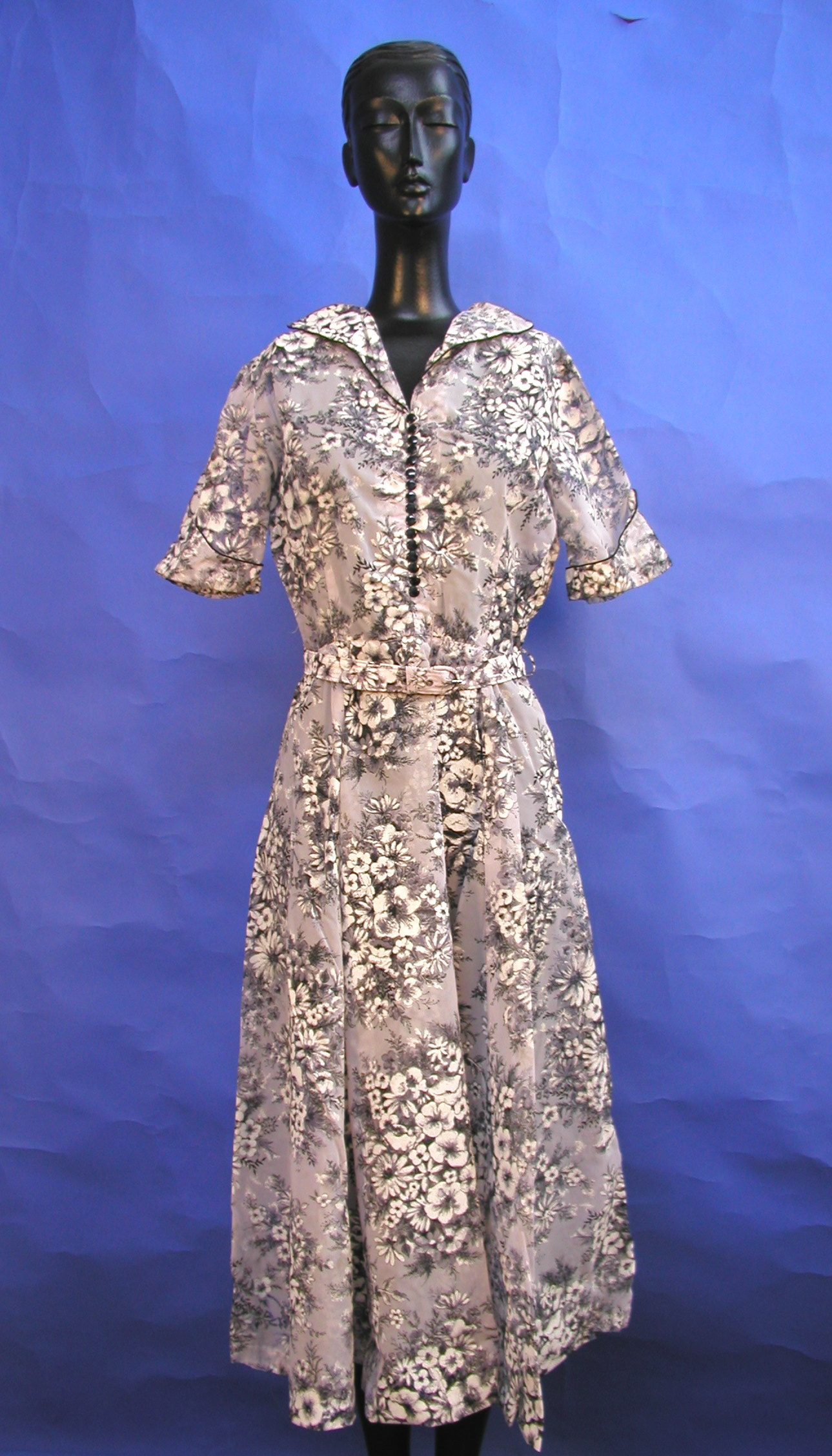
Day dress, c. 1940s

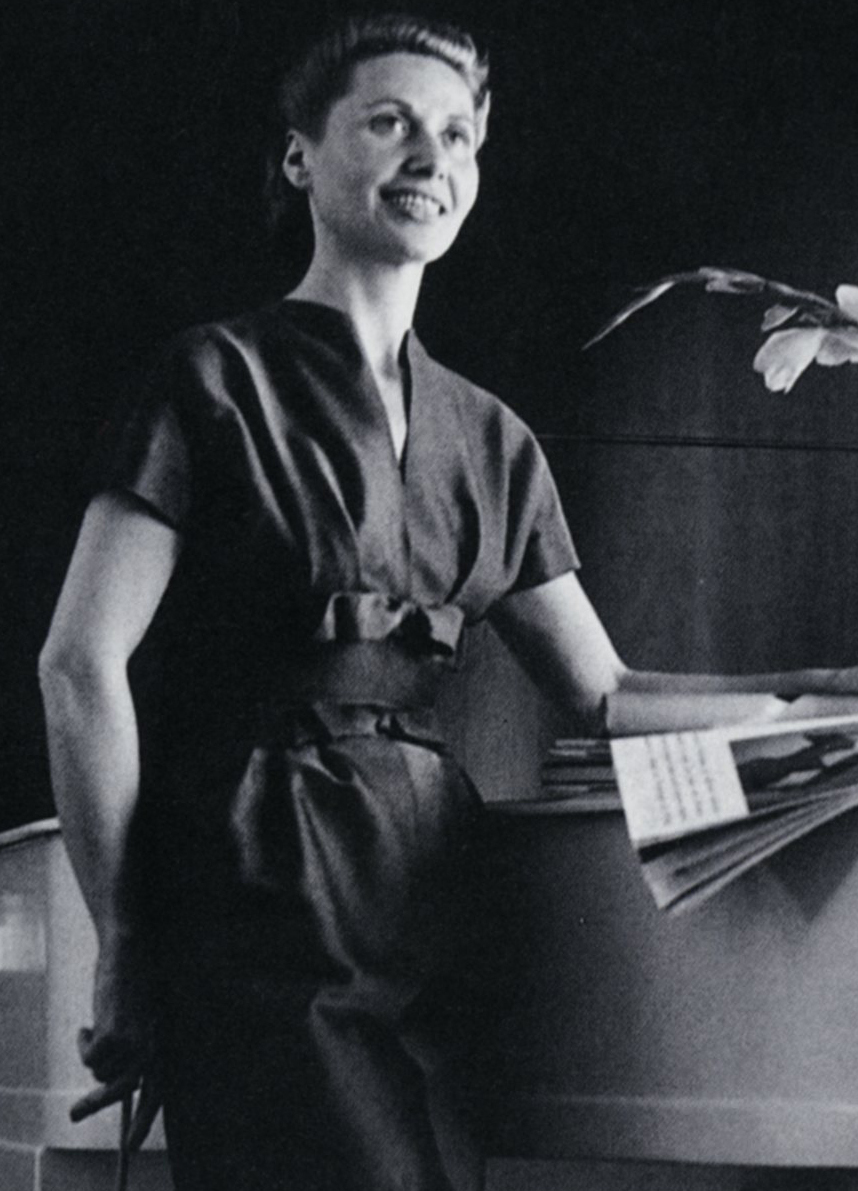
Lola Beer Ebner in "afternoon dress", 1950

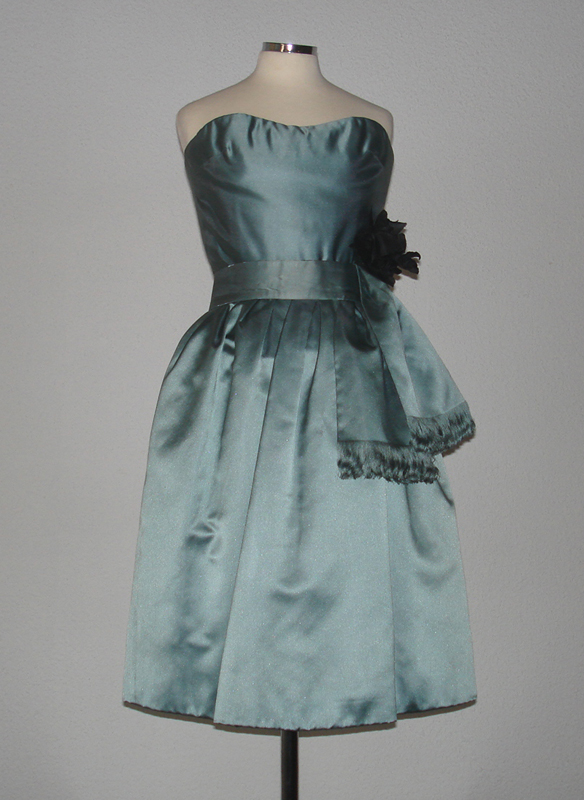
Blue satin cocktail dress, 1959

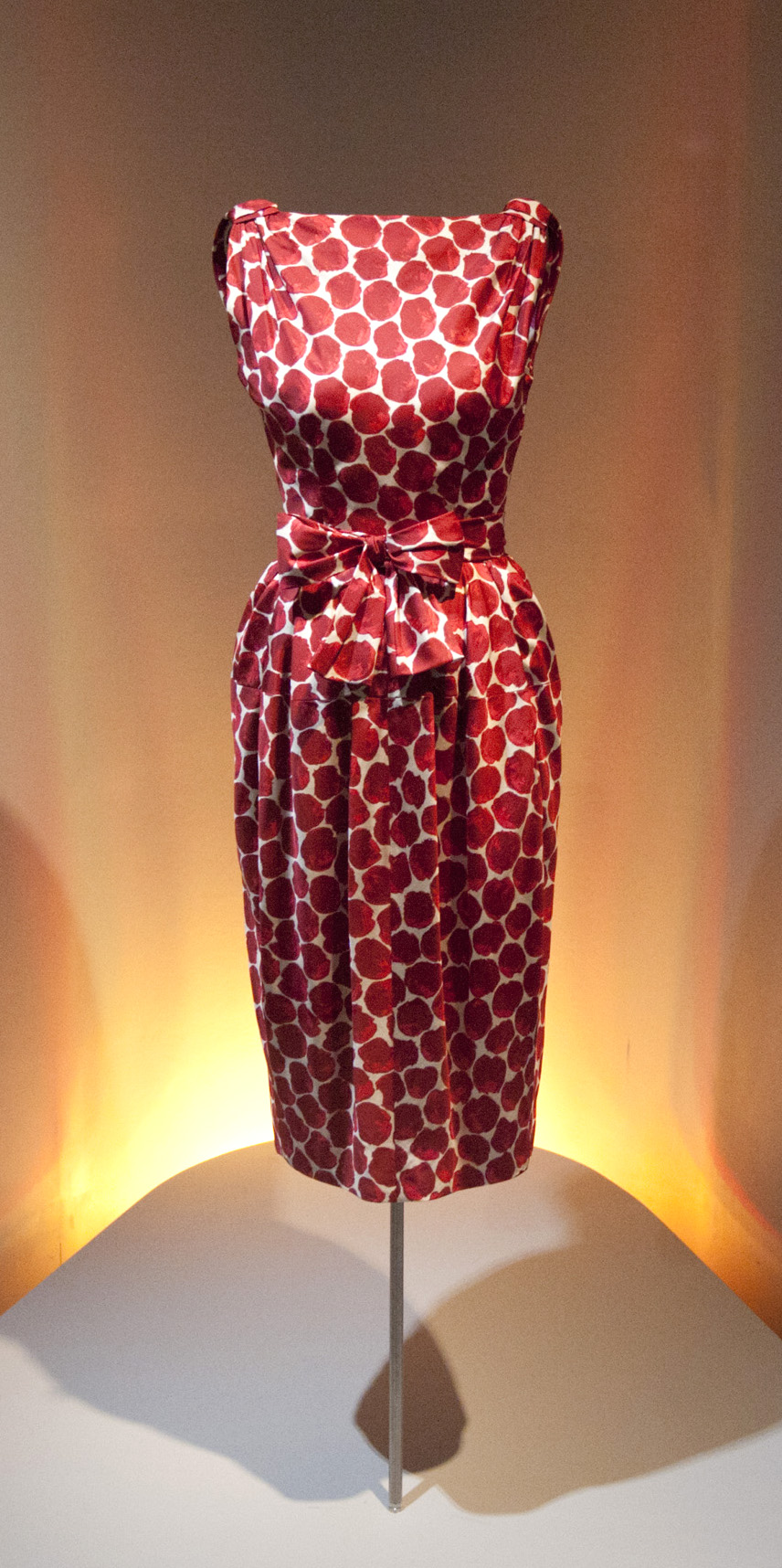
Printed dress, c. 1960

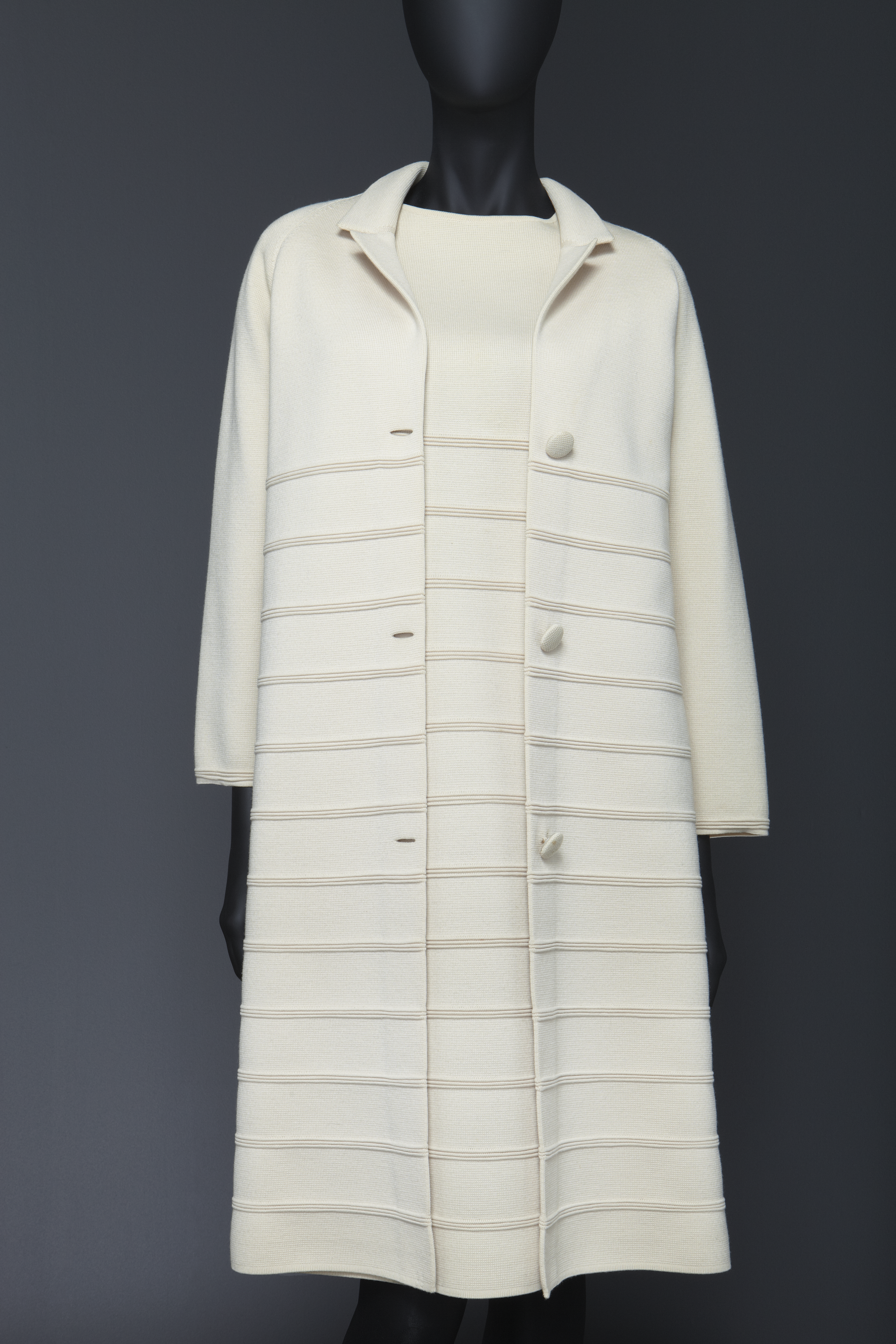
Jersey dress, c. 1970

=== Lengths ===
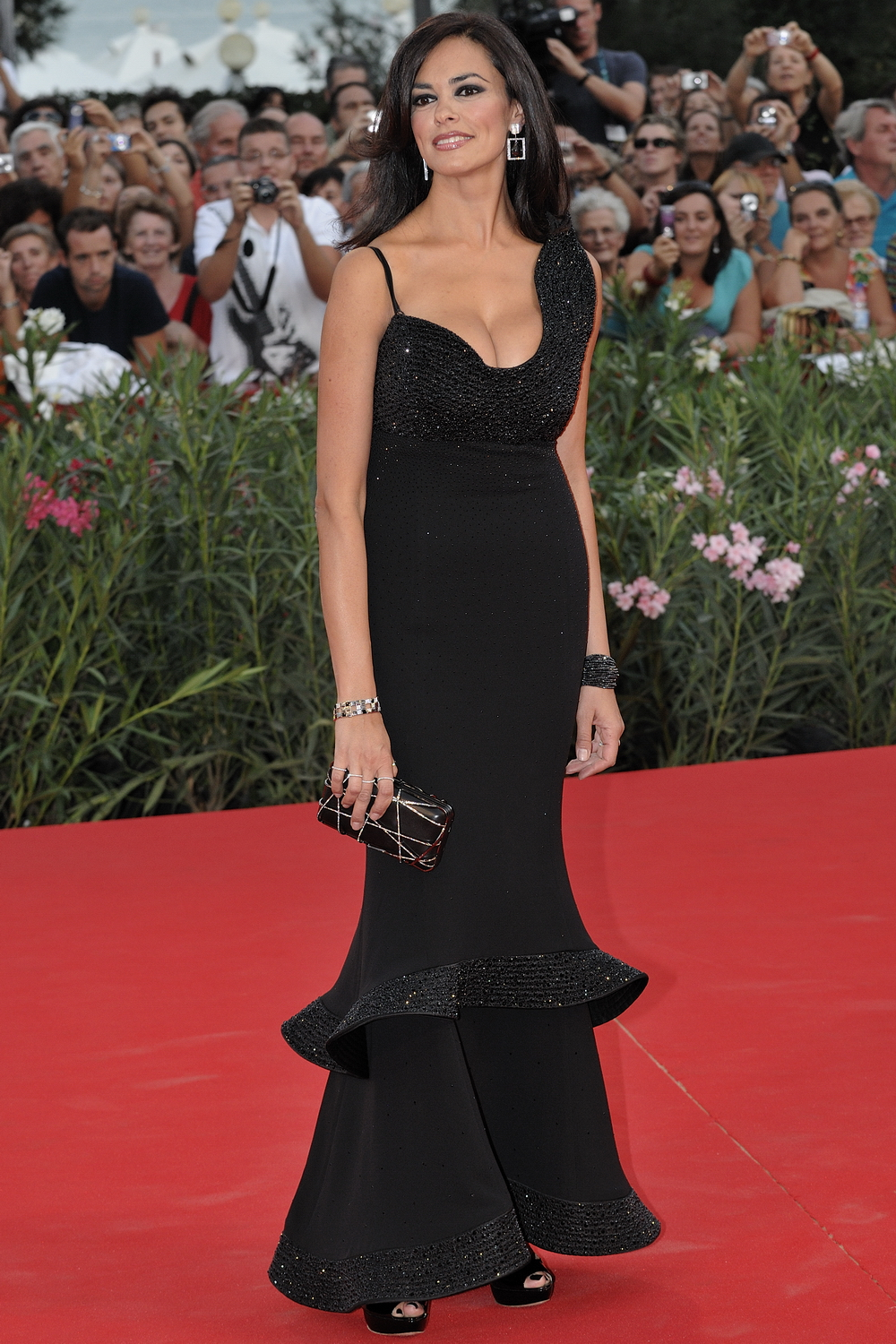
Gown or Long Dress – a woman's formal dress, usually having a floor-length skirt

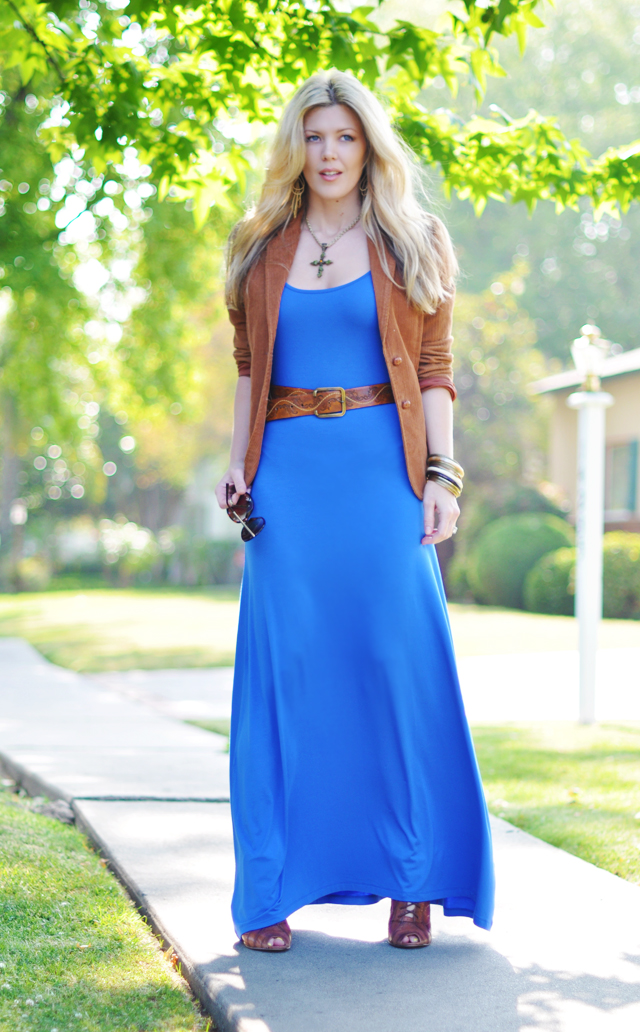
Maxi dresses (c. 1970) – Maxi is a term used since the late 1960s for ankle-length, typically informal dresses.

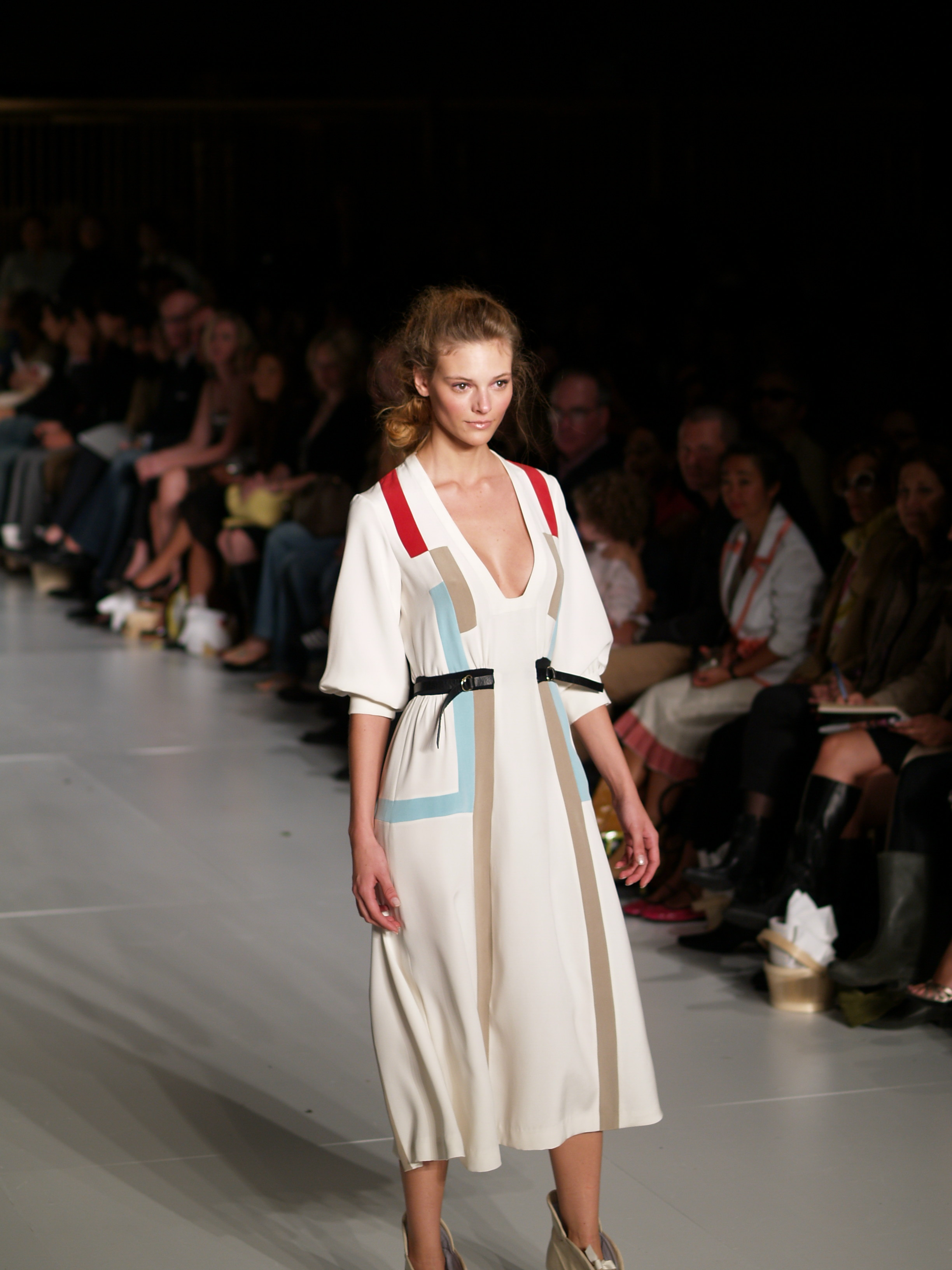
Midi dress – A "midi" is used to refer to any dress or skirt that has a hem which hits at mid-calf – halfway between the knee and ankle.

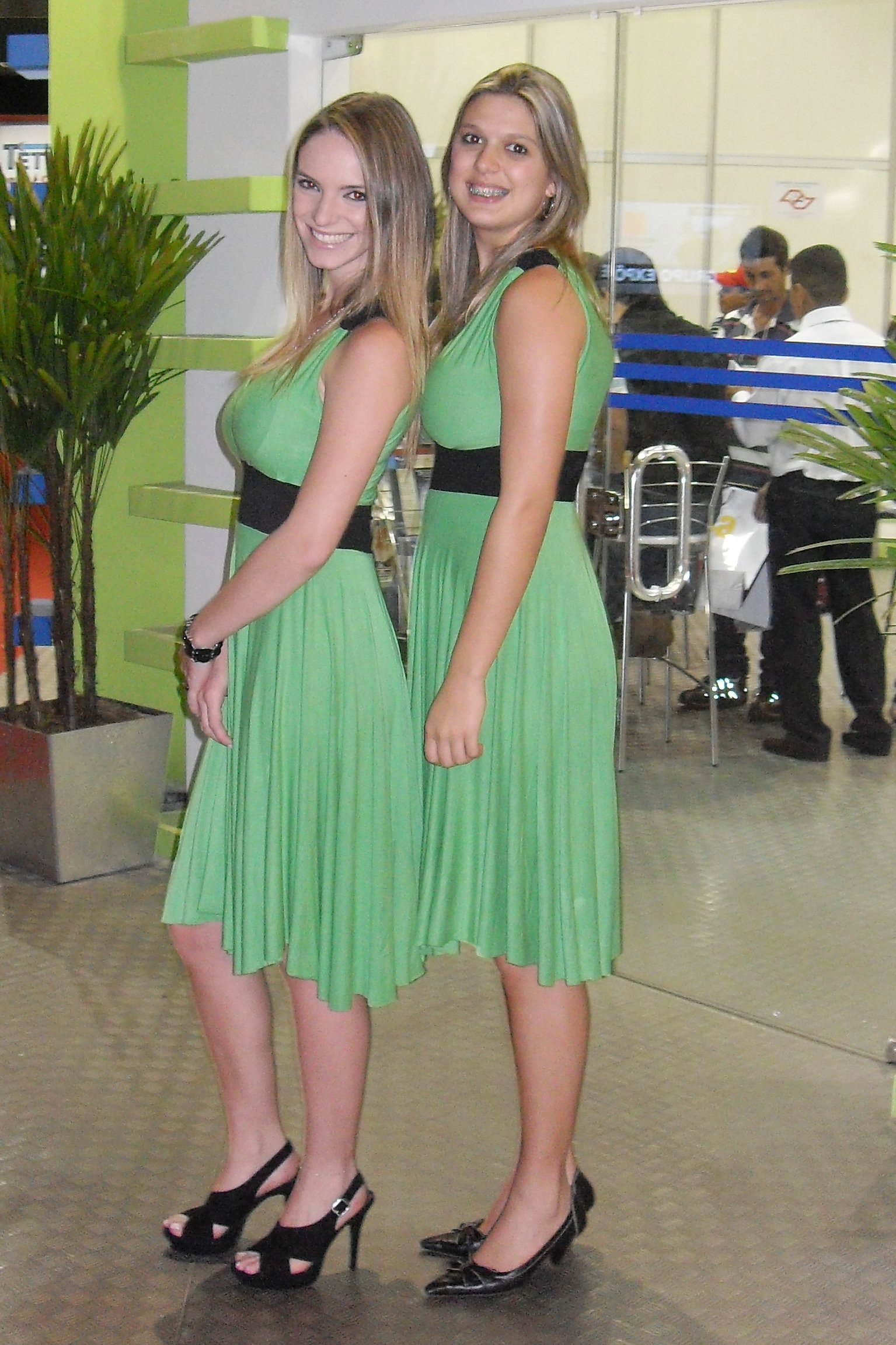
Knee length dress – Hemline ends at knee height.

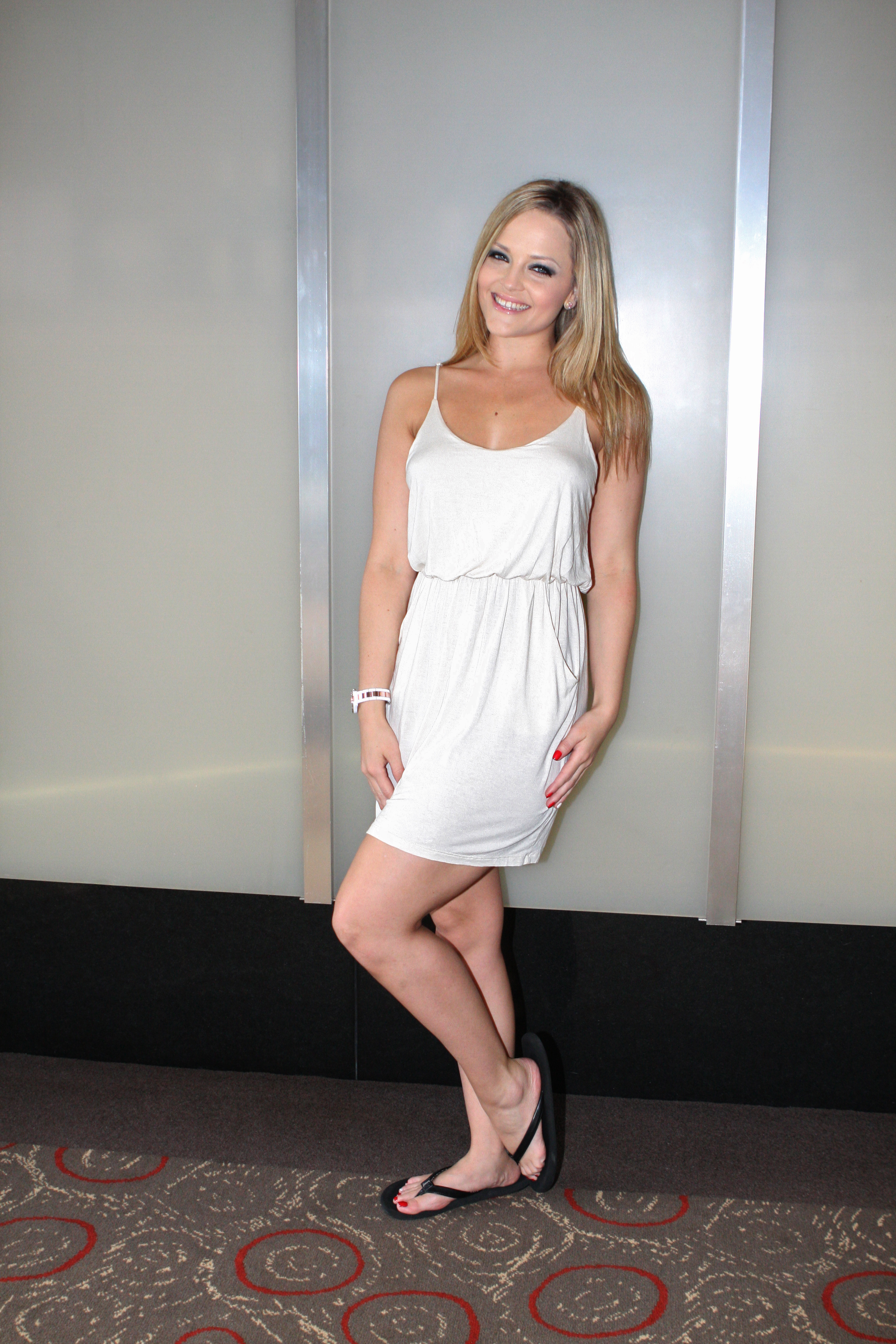
Mini dress (1960s) – a very short dress that terminates above the knee

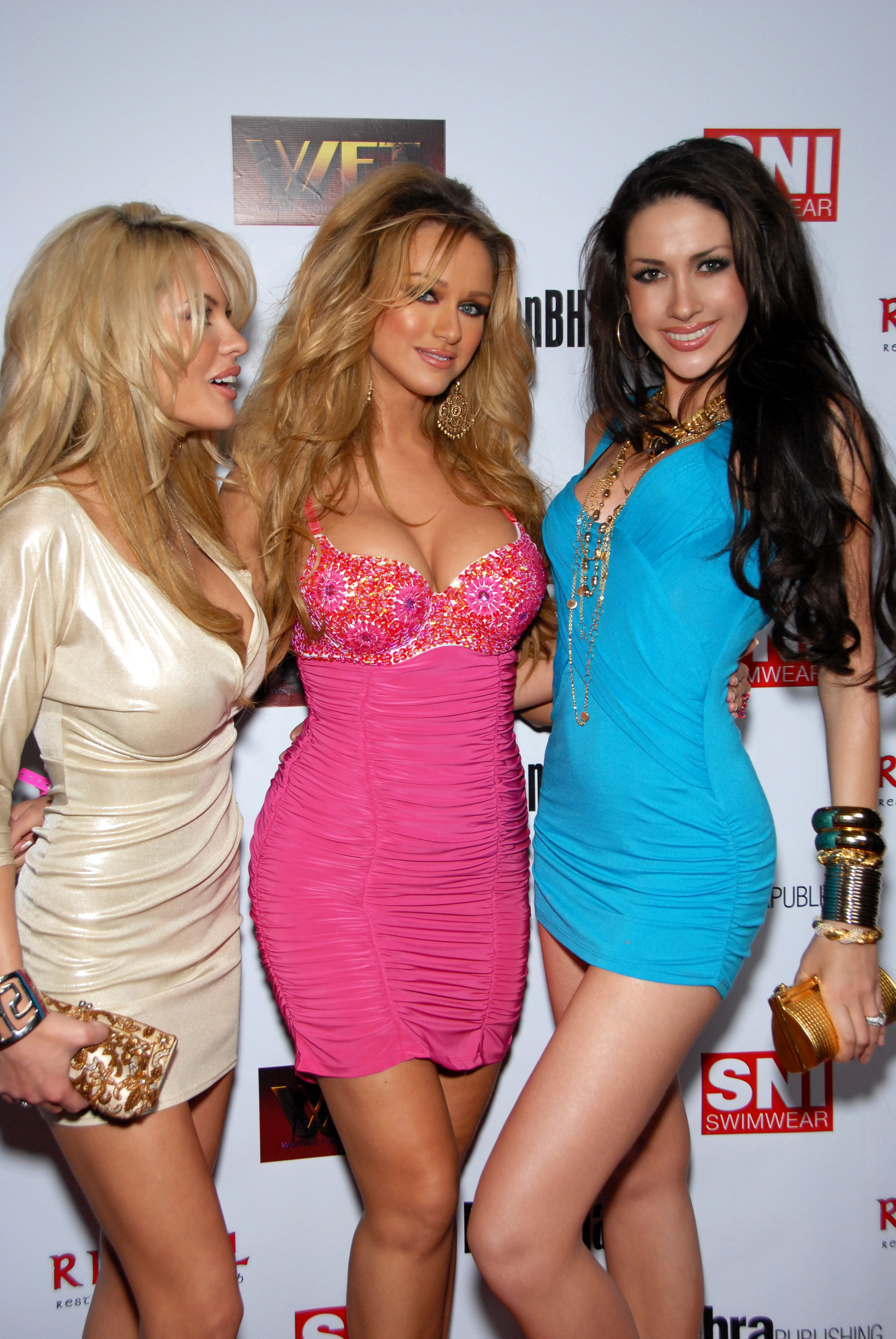
Micro dress (right) with minidresses, 2008 – A microdress is an extremely short version of a mini.

== See also ==
- Breeching (boys)
- China poblana
- Granny dress
- History of Western fashion
- Jumper dress
- Lingerie dress
- List of individual dresses
- Mantua
- Sack-back gown (also known as robe à la française)
- Squaw dress
