= Grunge (fashion) =

Fashion trend peaking in the mid-1990s

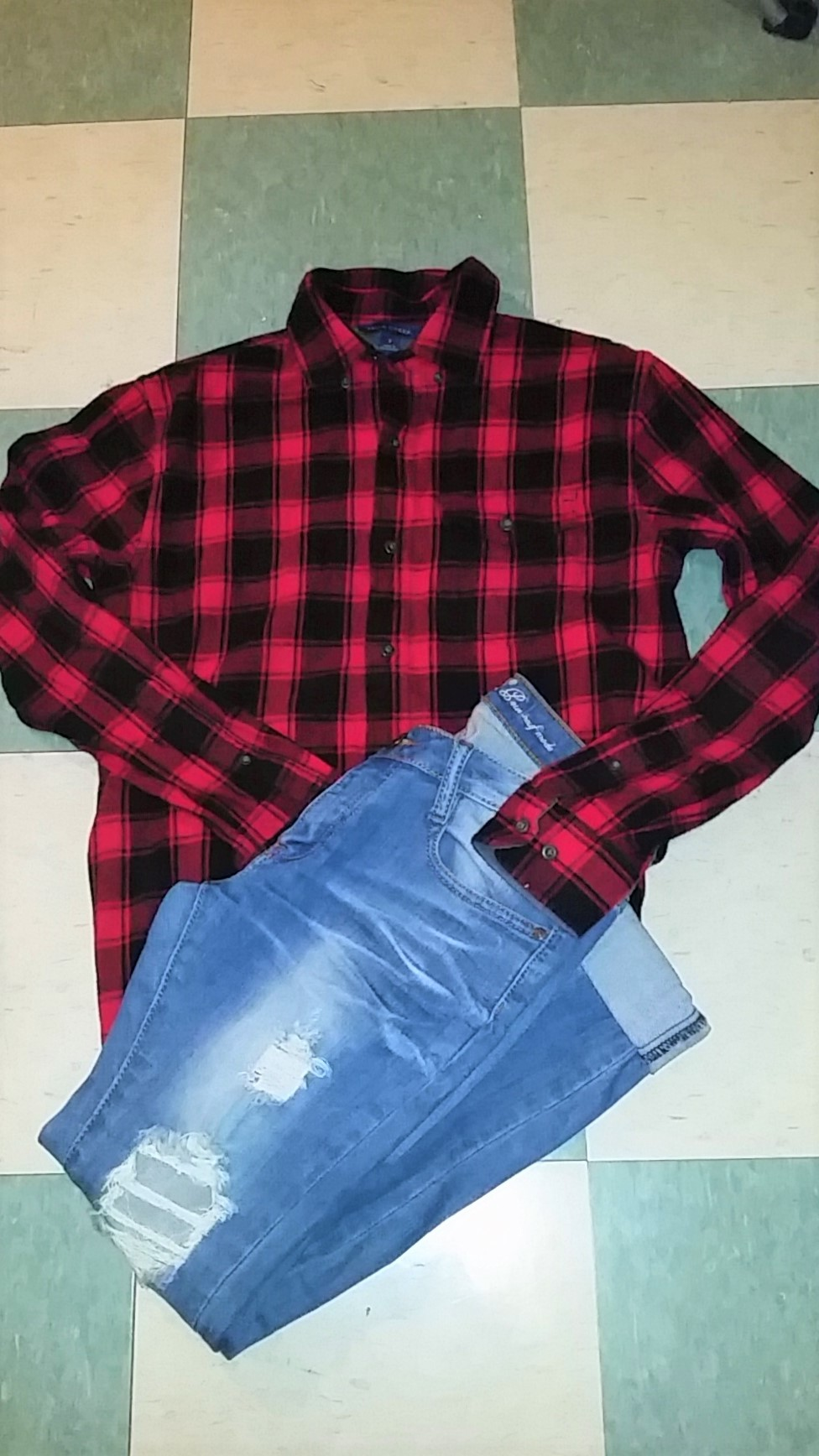
Flannels and jeans are staples in the grunge style.

Grunge fashion refers to the clothing, accessories and hairstyles of the grunge music genre. This subculture emerged in mid-1980s Seattle, and had reached wide popularity by the mid 1990s. Grunge fashion is characterized by durable or hardy thrift store clothing, often worn in a loose, androgynous manner to de-emphasize the silhouette. The style was popularized by music bands Alice in Chains, Nirvana, Soundgarden and Pearl Jam.

== Origins ==
The term grunge was adopted by the music industry for a style of music that had become wildly popular in the American Northwest during the early 1990s. The term first appeared in 1972, but it did not become a popular term in widespread media until the late 1980s, influenced by the surge and decline of punk. This view made its mark on the youth of the time and translated into their choice of fashion.

In 1992, The New York Times wrote: "This stuff is cheap, it's durable, and it's kind of timeless. It also runs against the grain of the whole flashy aesthetic that existed in the 80's."

In a 1998 article for the Journal of Cultural Geography, Thomas Bell said "Flannel shirts and Doc Martens boots were worn as an anti-fashion statement that is undoubtedly related to the unassuming and unvarnished nature of the music itself".

== Pop-culture influence on 1990s grunge ==
One of the biggest influences on grunge fashion was rock star Kurt Cobain, the lead singer of the band Nirvana. It is widely believed that Cobain represented the core of the grunge movement and the phenomenon of the grunge scene's influence. Cobain's style was a combination from both male and female fashion, and "his Seattle thrift-store look ran the gamut of masculine lumberjack workwear and 40s-by-way-of-70s feminine dresses." Cobain's wife, Courtney Love, was mostly known for her "kinderwhore" sense of style used by many female grunge bands. The look consisted of barrettes, tiaras, ripped tights, Mary Janes, slips and Peter Pan collared dresses. Love claims that she drew the inspiration for her kinderwhore look from Christina Amphlett of Divinyls.

Eddie Vedder of Pearl Jam and Chris Cornell of Soundgarden made their mark on the grunge fashion scene with flannel shirts, leather jackets, corduroy jackets, kilts, shorts-over-leggings, ripped jeans and snapbacks. They were best known for inspiring the Doc Martens trend. One of the reasons why the Doc Martens boots became popular among grunge musicians was that in the late 1980s, Susan Silver (the manager of Soundgarden, Alice in Chains and Screaming Trees, as well as the first wife of singer Chris Cornell) was the manager of a John Fluevog shoe store in Seattle that sold Doc Martens boots, and several local musicians such as Cornell, as well as Layne Staley and Jerry Cantrell of Alice in Chains, and Andrew Wood of Mother Love Bone would hang out at that store, which also had future Candlebox lead vocalist Kevin Martin as one of Silver's employees before the band was formed.

== Men's fashion ==
Grunge fashion/style was influenced by disheveled and androgynous thrift-store clothing, defined by a looseness, de-emphasizing the body's silhouette. Men wear second-hand or shabby T-shirts with slogans, band logos, etc. A tartan shirt might accompany the T-shirt, along with ripped or faded jeans. Black combat-style boots, such as Doc Martens, completes the ensemble.

== Women's fashion ==
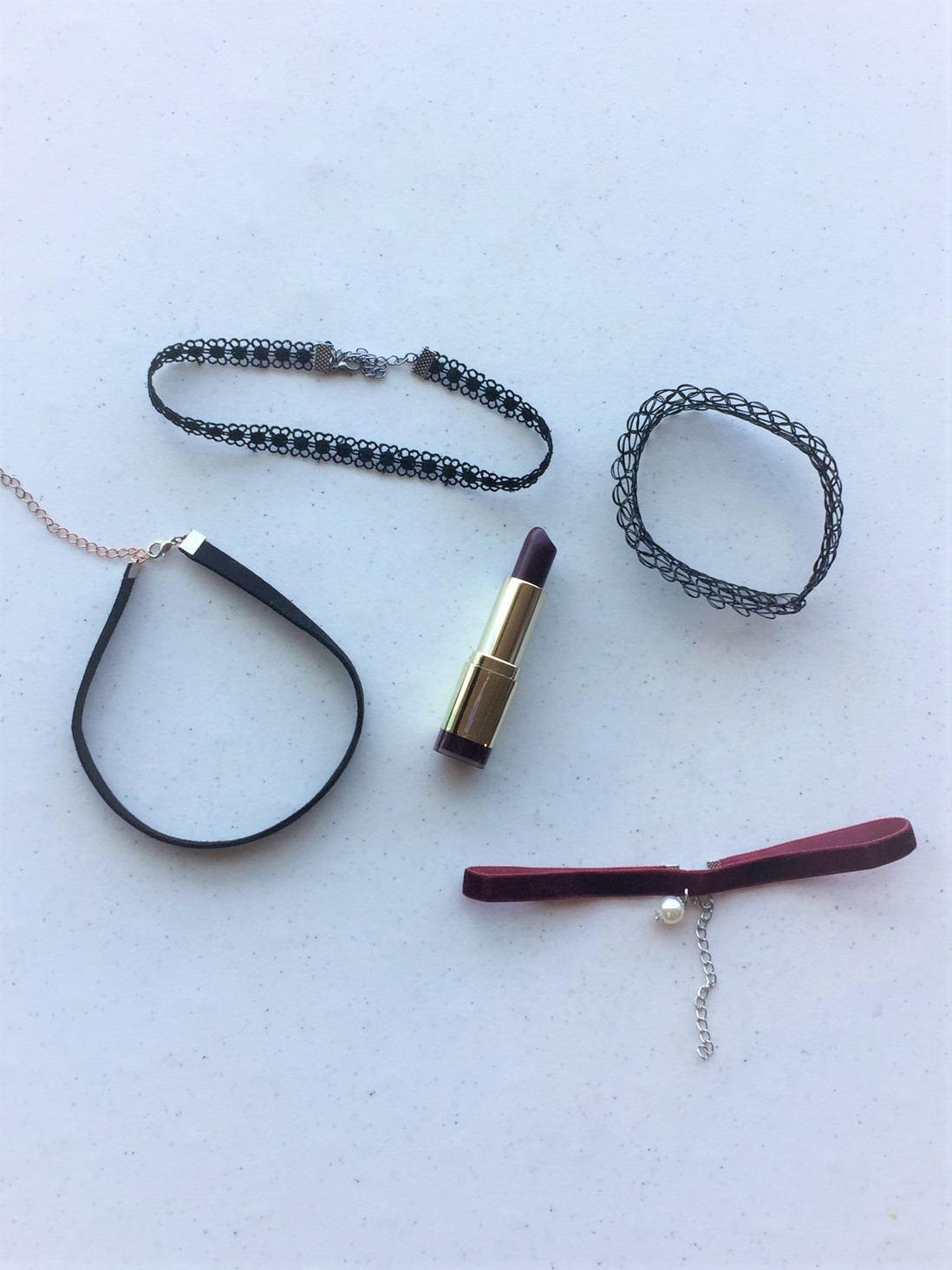
Accessories used in grunge fashion

In the 1990s, less was more and dressing-down was an acceptable norm. For shoes, women started wearing clunky combat boots and Doc Martens. They typically wore slip dresses with flannels, flannels and ripped jeans, and tartan in layers. Low-rise and ripped, wide-legged jeans were popular. The clothing was paired with simple jewelry such as chokers and hoop earrings and dark, rich-colored lipstick. Bell-bottom jeans from the 1970s were popular again by 1992, along with the baby-doll T-shirt.

== Designer ==
When grunge started to be a popular trend in the early 1990s, fashion designer Marc Jacobs was the first designer who brought grunge to the luxury platform. In 1993, Jacobs as the creative director of women's design at Perry Ellis, debuted a spring collection inspired by grunge. The collection included some iconic grunge items such as flannel shirts, printed granny dresses, Dr. Martens boots, and knitted skullcaps. Fashion critic Suzy Menkes declared "Grunge is ghastly." New York magazine said, "Grunge: 1992–1993, R.I.P." A few years later, Jacobs and his business partner would join the French luxury brand Louis Vuitton.

== Grunge in the 2010s and 2020s ==
According to a 2013 Today article, the 1990s made a comeback after New York Fashion Week (NYFW) when designers shared their interpretations of Seattle's early 1990s boho-chic. This led to grunge fashion appearing in shopping malls and grunge-inspired back-to-school looks.

In 2013, Yves Saint Laurent and Dries van Noten successfully attempted to re-introduce grunge to the runway, bringing it back into the fashion zeitgeist.

In 2022, Nylon magazine wrote that 1990s Grunge "is one of Fall 2022's biggest fashion trends", with brands and designers such as Marc Jacobs, Molly Goddard, Dsquared2, and Givenchy having collections inspired by grunge fashion.

In June 2025, GQ wrote that grunge style was trending again thanks to TikTok, British singer Charli XCX, and Italian fashion house Magliano's fall-winter 2025 collection inspired by grunge fashion.

== Gallery ==
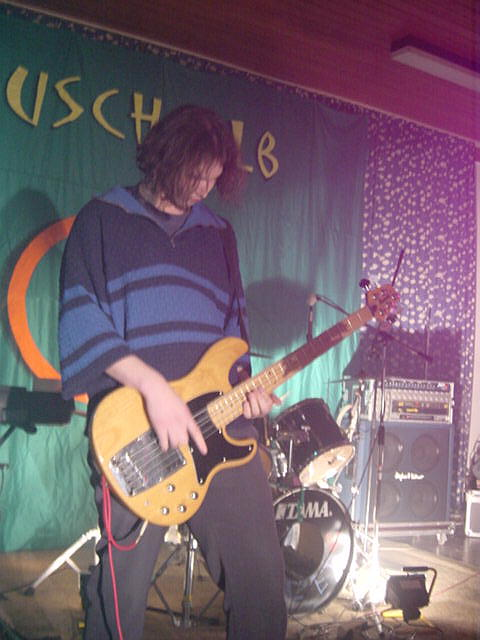
Photo of bassist in grunge attire, 2001

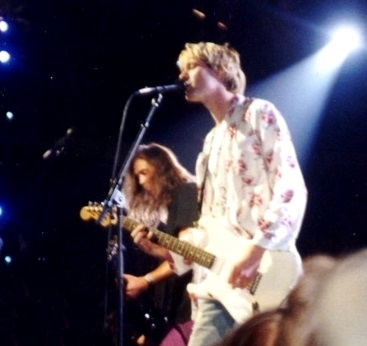
Nirvana are known for popularizing the style. Cobain pictured c. 1992.

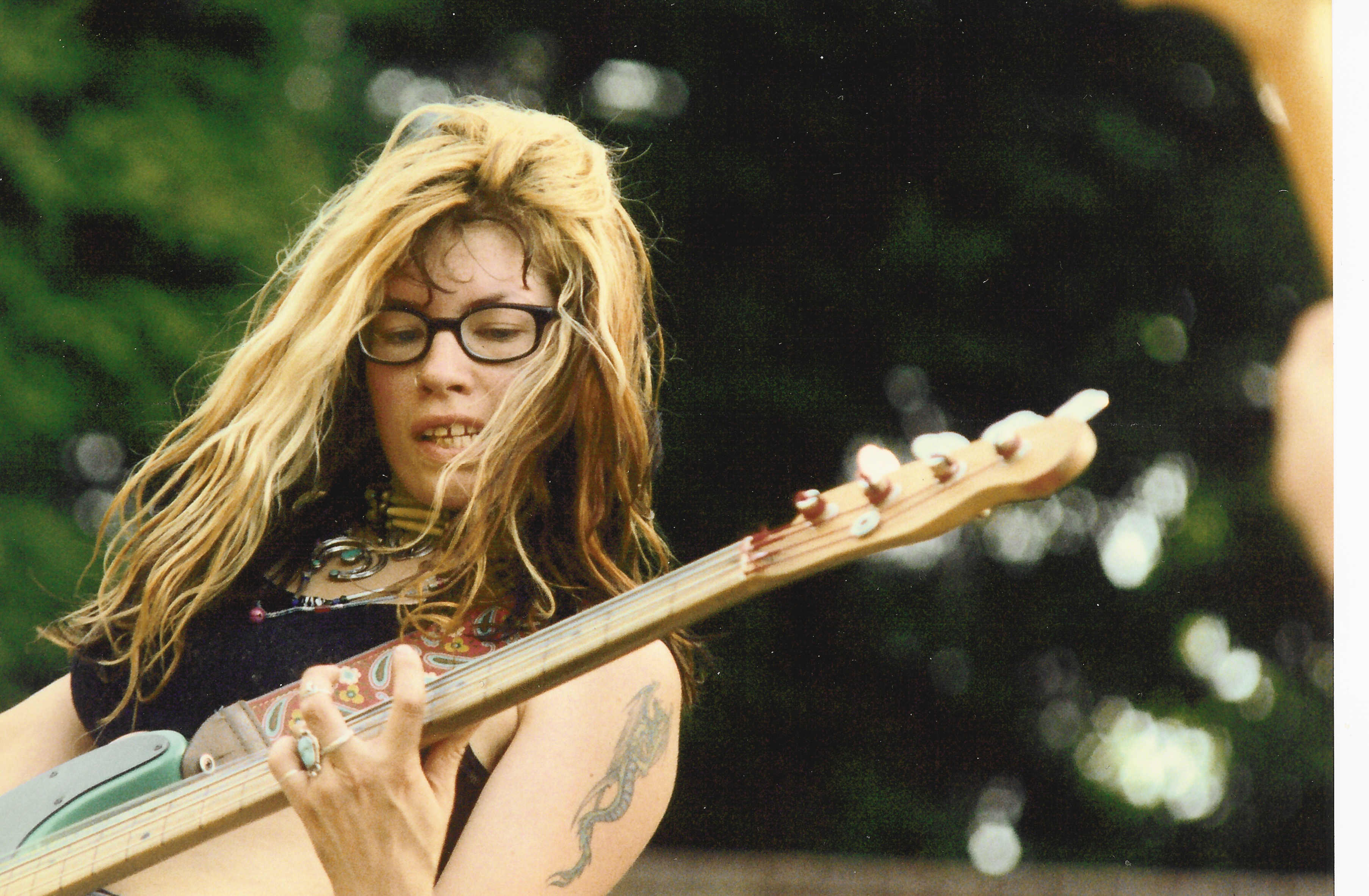
Dawn Henschen of grunge band Bone Cellar in 1992

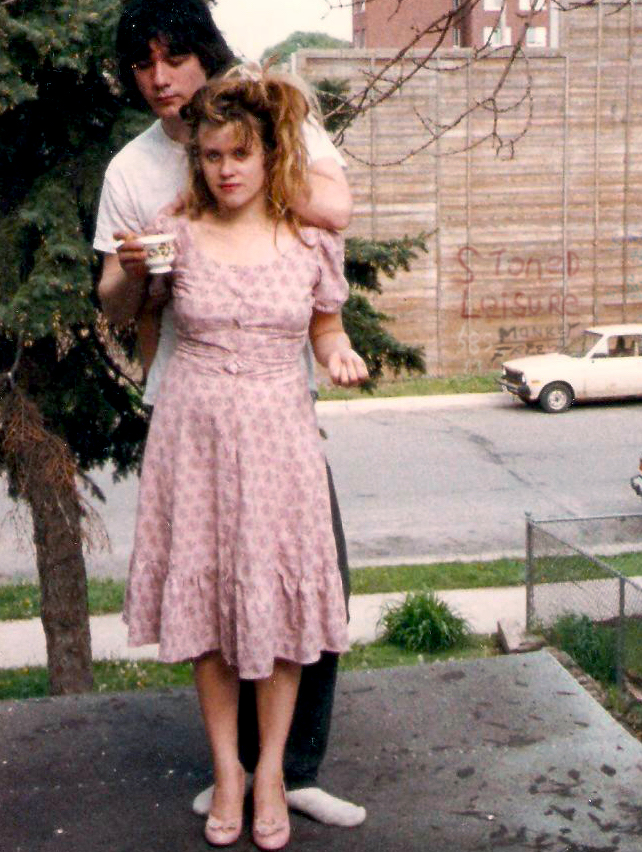
Kat Bjelland of popular grunge band Babes in Toyland in 1992
