= Overskirt =

Women's short skirt

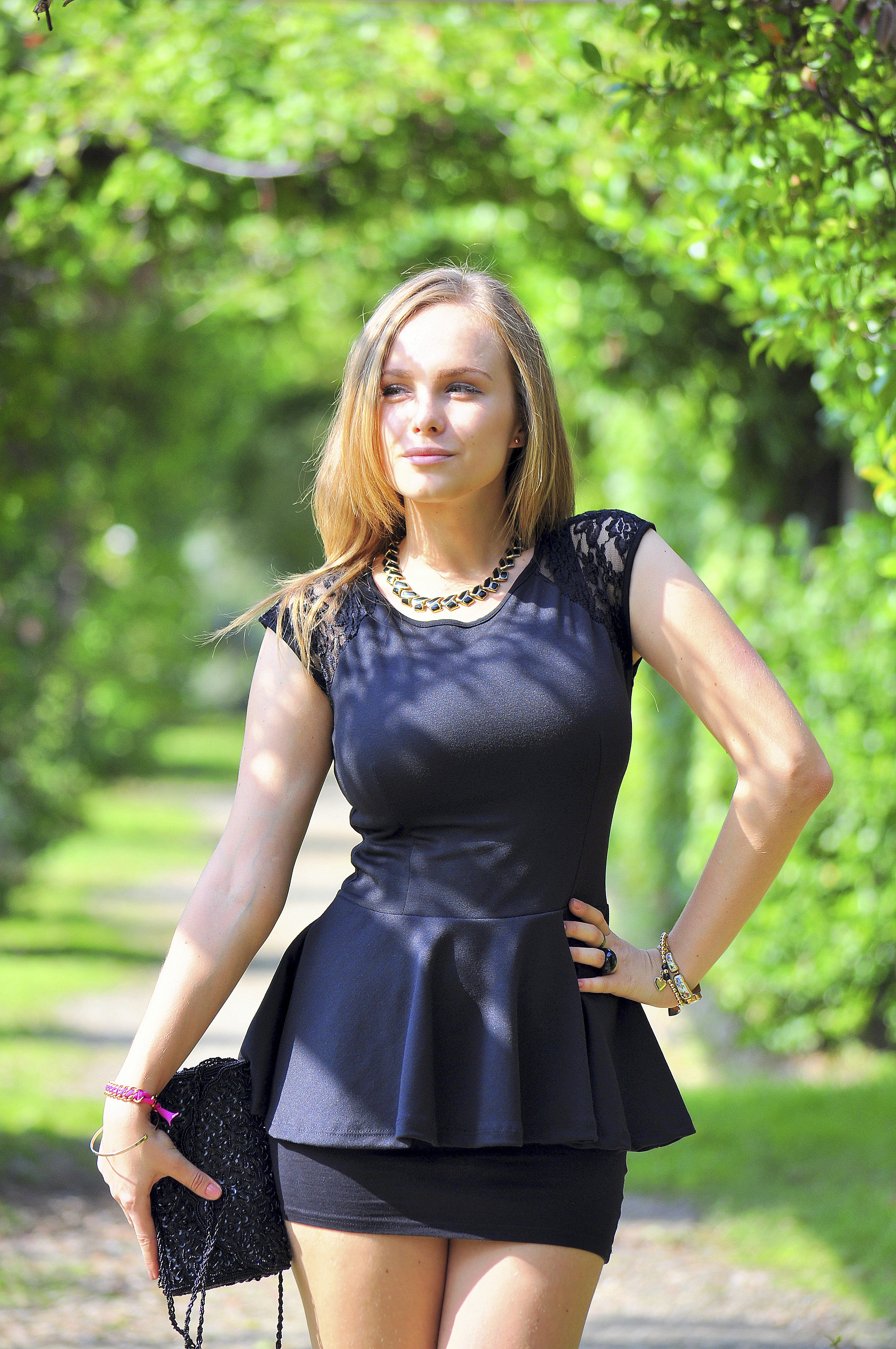
A woman wearing a tunic-like overskirt and skirt.

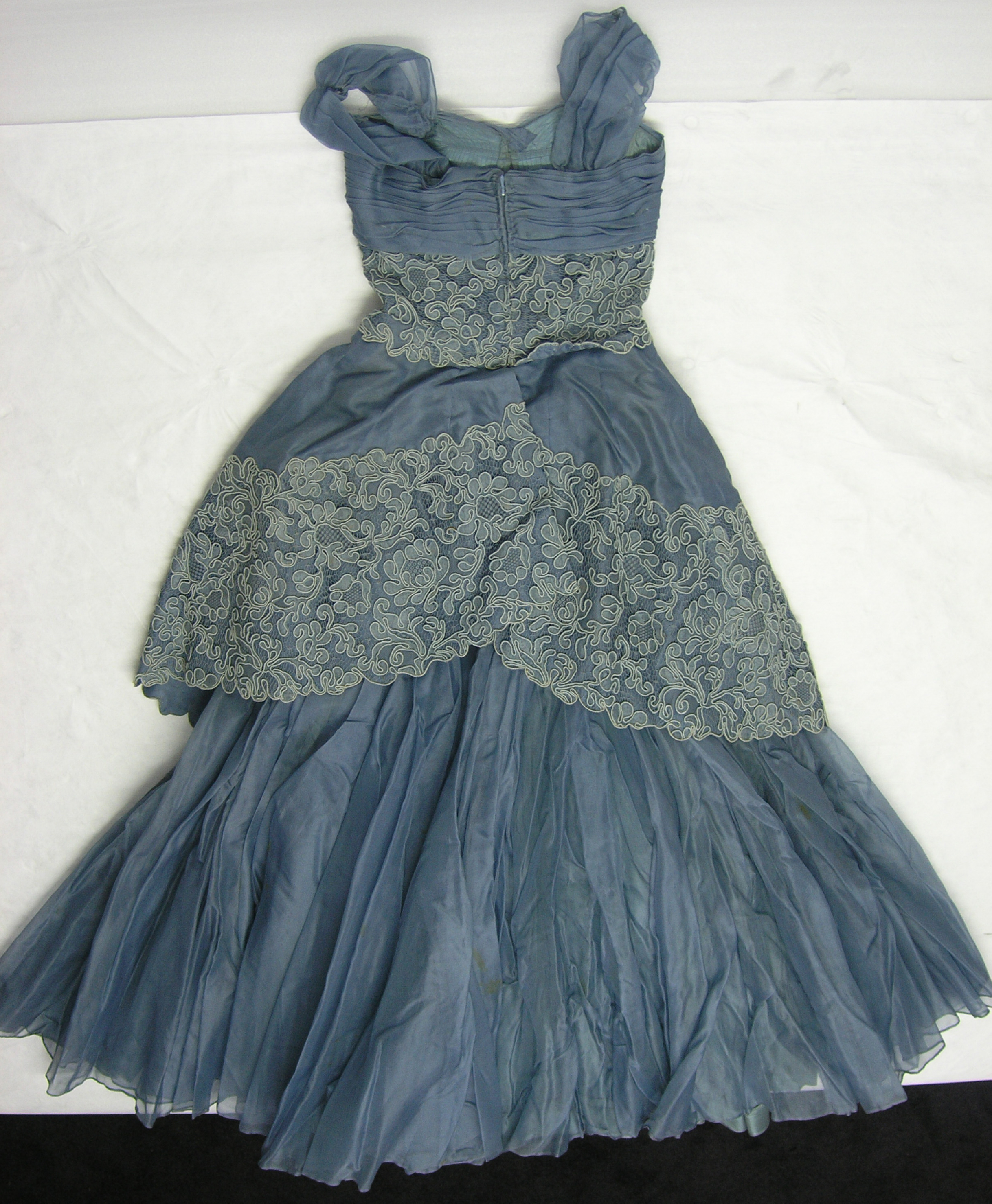
A 1950s evening dress showing a short overskirt (or peplum)

An overskirt is a type of women's short skirt which is draped over another garment, such as a skirt, breeches, or trousers. Although peplum is often used as another term for overskirt, it should not be confused with the peplos or "peplum dress", which was worn in ancient Greece.

The design of the overskirt depended on the era in which it appeared, and a variety of overskirts have appeared through history:

- Casaquin—Popularly known from the 1740s onwards as a pet-en-l'air, this was a short version of the sack-back gown (also known as the robe à la française) which appeared in the 1780s.
- Greatcoat dress—Despite the name, this garment mimicked the men's greatcoat. It was essentially an ankle-length robe worn over a skirt. The robe could be buttoned from collar to hem, with the overskirt of the robe completely covering the petticoat. More often, the robe was left unbuttoned below the waist and the overskirt allowed to fall away on either side to reveal the petticoat. It was fashionable in the late 1700s.
- Irish polonaise—Also known as a "French polonaise", "Italian polonaise", or "Turkish polonaise", this garment consisted of a tight-fitting, low, squarish bodice with an overskirt. The overskirt was in a style similar to the polonaise: pleated to the bodice, bunched in the rear, and open in front. The overskirt was much longer than the petticoat beneath. It was popular in the United Kingdom from 1770 to 1775.
- Italian nightgown—Also known as an "Italian robe" and "Italian polonaise", this was an informal garment. This dress appeared in the United Kingdom from the 1750s to 1790s. The dress consisted of a stayed bodice with somewhat low-cut décolletage, sleeves which reached the elbow, skirt, and overskirt. The overskirt, in this case, was almost always of a contrasting color to the skirt, and was almost as long as the skirt itself. The overskirt could be gathered and draped into a polonaise.
- Mantua—This was essentially an oversized gown, popular throughout Europe from the mid 1600s to mid 1700s. In its later configurations, the mantua featured an unstayed bodice which was joined to an overskirt. The overskirt was open in the front to reveal a highly decorative underskirt. In the rear, the overskirt was elaborately bunched, draped, and folded, at times even being cut and formed to create a short train.
- Milkmaid skirt—The term originally applied to a bustle, but was also used to describe a daytime dress which first appeared in 1885. This dress consisted of a skirt with two stripes (each a different color), with an overskirt with gathers at the waist.
- Pano—An ankle-length transparent overskirt worn by both men and women in Egypt between 4,000 BC and 30 BC.
- Pentes—The term originally applied to a bustle, but was applied in 1886 to a skirt made of pyramidal panels. An overskirt or tunic was worn over the skirt, and draped to expose the underskirt.
- Peplum—This overskirt was cut away front and back, while the sides formed points. Created about 1866 and revived in the 1890s, was considered informal wear. In the early 20th century, the peplum was revived and the term meant any overskirt cut to form points. It could also mean any basque extended over and past the hips and cut in a style similar to the overskirt. (Note: The term "peplum" is sometimes used to describe fabric draped over a sleeve. The over-fabric is attached at the armhole or the bicep and allowed to drape over the sleeve the way an overskirt drapes over a skirt.)
- Peplum basque—Essentially the lower part of a basque, but with longer extensions over the hips and strapped to the body with a belt. It was generally worn with a bodice. It appeared in the United Kingdom.
- Peplum bodice—An evening bodice with long panniers. The overskirt covered only the panniers. It appeared in the United Kingdom.
- Peplum imperatrice—Similar to the peplum basque. There were two versions: A peplum basque worn with a tunic (which covered the panniers), or a peplum basque with draped panniers. It appeared in France.
- Peplum overskirt—Introduced in the United Kingdom in 1894, this garment was pleated at the waist. It was short in back, but hem-length in the front. It was often open and rippled in the front, and the side seams somewhat gathered.
- Piedmont gown—Also known as the "robe à la Piétmontèse", this was a version of the sack-back gown. The box pleats were not sewn or fastened to the bodice, but instead formed an arc from the top of the bodice to the hips. There, the box pleats became part of the overskirt.
- Polonaise—A gown with a cutaway, draped, swagged overskirt worn over a petticoat. The polonaise overskirt was cut away in a "V" shape in the front to reveal the petticoat, and cords were passed through tabs or rings on the interior of the overskirt to make draping easier. The petticoat was exposed in the rear as well due to this draping.
- Safeguard, a riding garment worn as an overskirt by women in the sixteenth and seventeenth centuries.
- Tunic dress—A tunic that reached below the waistline and which covered a dress or petticoat. The overskirt was the same length as the underskirt. It came in a wide range of designs and lengths, and was popular in Europe and the Americas from 1815 to 1890.
- Tunic skirt—Similar to the tunic dress, the overskirt was shorter than the underskirt. It developed in the United Kingdom. Beginning in the 1850s, the overskirt came to be trimmed with lace while the underskirt was trimmed with a ruffle. The tunic skirt waned in popularity but reemerged in 1897 without the trim on either skirt.

== See also ==
- Churidar
- Peplum jacket
- Yaoqun – a traditional Chinese overskirt in Hanfu

== Bibliography ==
- Callahan, Colleen R. (2016). "Robe à la polonaise". Clothing and Fashion: American Fashion From Head to Toe. Vol. 1: Pre-Colonial Times Through the American Revolution. Santa Barbara, Calif.: ABC-Clio. ISBN 9781610693097.
- Cumming, Valerie; Cunnington, C.W.; Cunnington, P.E. (2017). Dictionary of Fashion History. New York: Bloomsbury Publishing. ISBN 9781472577702.
- Lewandowski, Elizabeth J. (2011). The Complete Costume Dictionary. Lanham, Md.: Scarecrow Press. ISBN 9780810840041.
- Waugh, Norah (1964). The Cut of Women's Clothes, 1600-1900. London: Faber. ISBN 0571085946.
