= Peplum jacket =

Jacket with a short overskirt

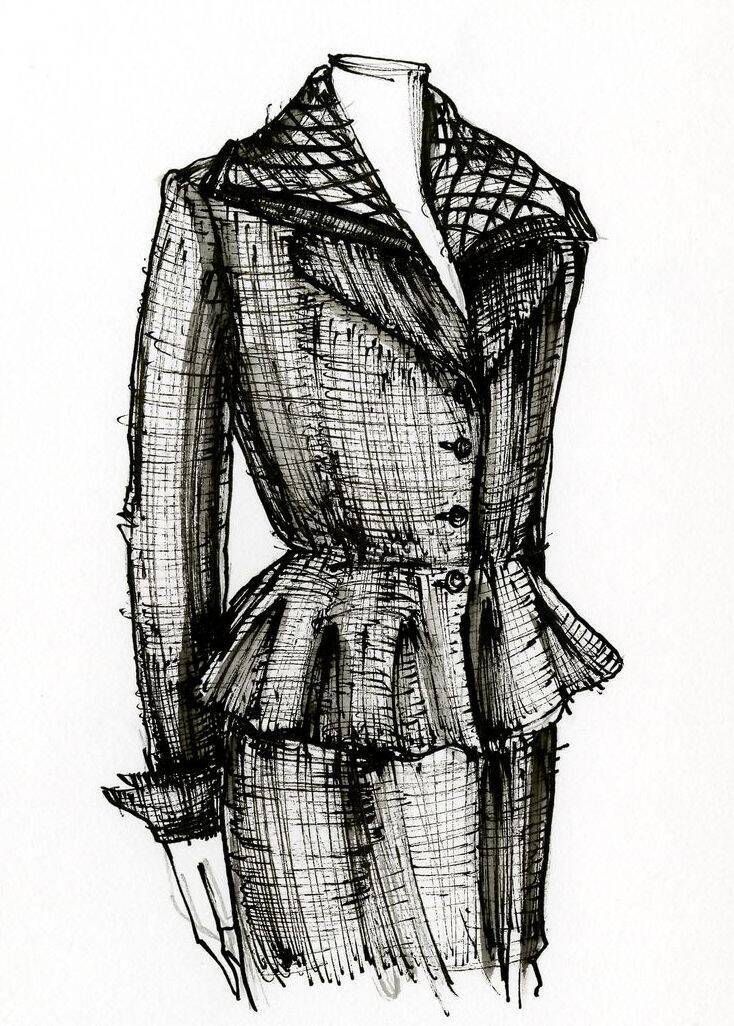
Drawing of a Peplum Jacket, by David Ring.

A peplum jacket is a jacket with a short overskirt known as a peplum attached. Peplum jackets experienced a revival as a fashion trend in 2012.
