= Sack-back gown =

Women's fashion of 18th century Europe

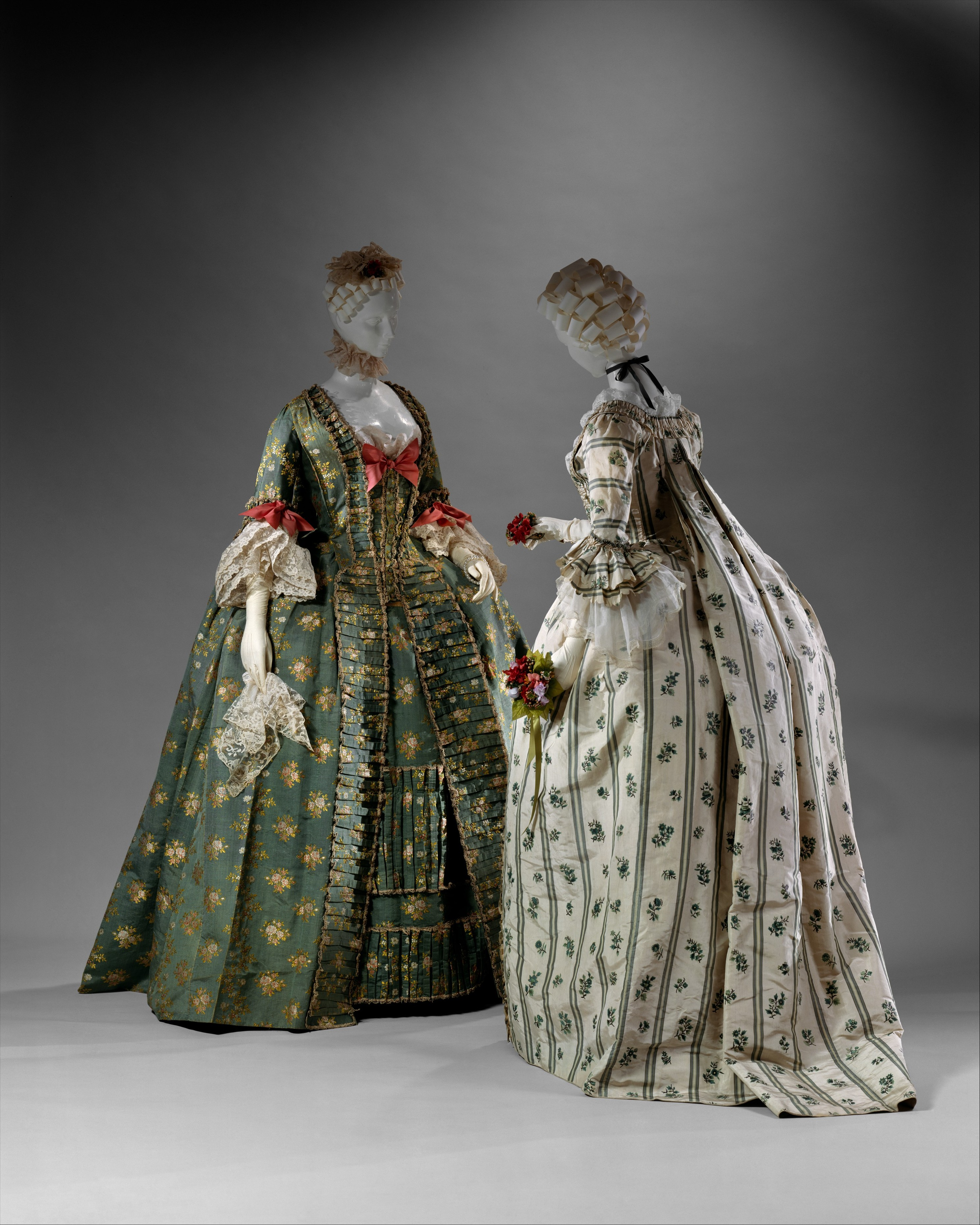
Two robes à la Française, front and back views, 1750–75 (MET)

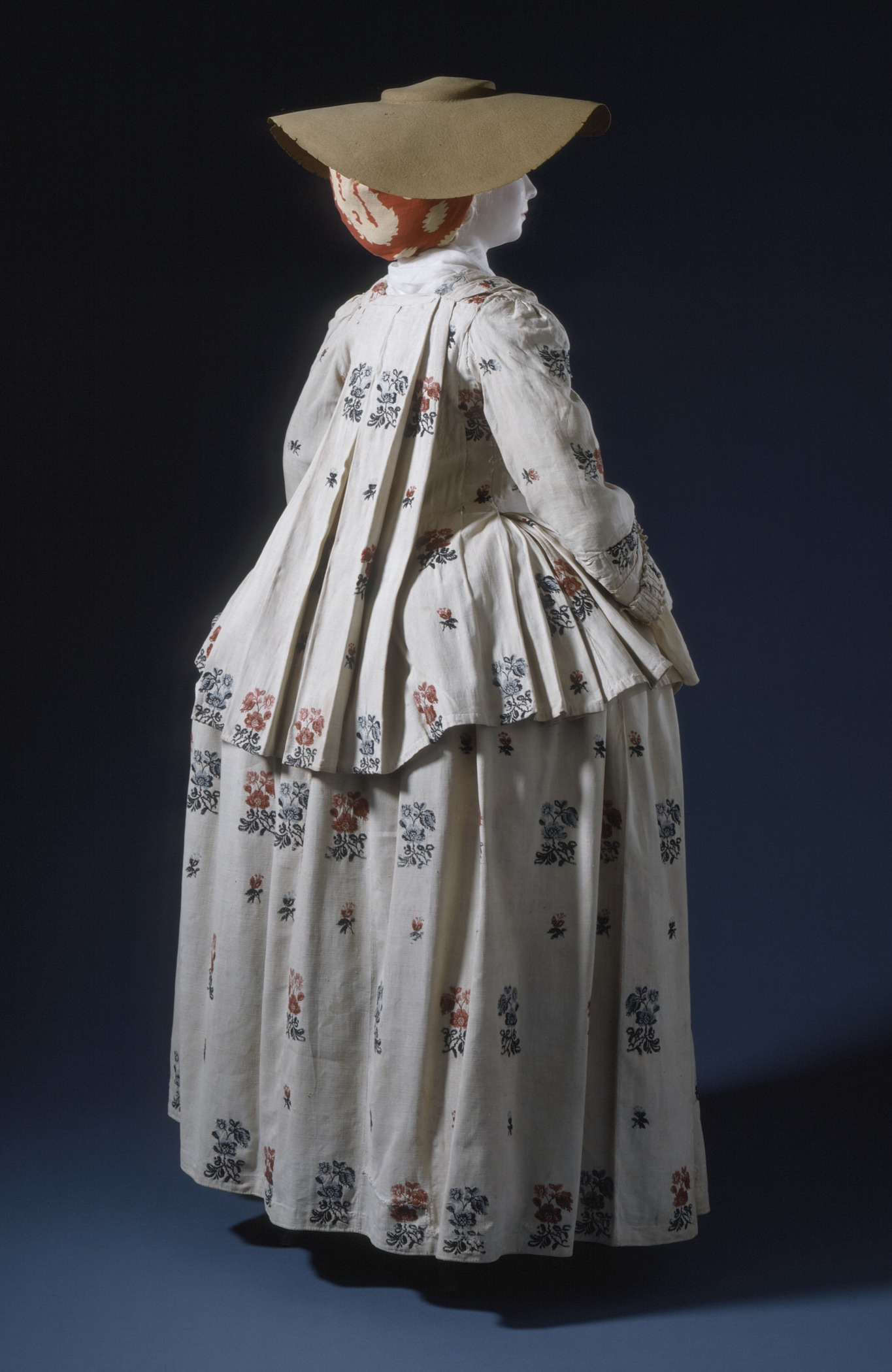
Woven linen pet-en-l'air with sack back, worn with a matching petticoat. France or England, c. 1770s. (LACMA) M.67.8.74

The sack-back gown or robe à la française was a women's fashion of 18th century Europe. At the beginning of the century, the sack-back gown was a very informal style of dress. At its most informal, it was unfitted both front and back and called a sacque, contouche, or robe battante. By the 1770s the sack-back gown was second only to court dress in its formality. This style of gown had fabric at the back arranged in box pleats which fell loose from the shoulder to the floor with a slight train. In front, the gown was open, showing off a decorative stomacher and petticoat. It would have been worn with a wide square hoop or panniers under the petticoat. Scalloped ruffles often trimmed elbow-length sleeves, which were worn with separate frills called engageantes.

The casaquin (popularly known from the 1740s onwards as a pet-en-l'air) was an abbreviated version of the robe à la française worn as a jacket for informal wear with a matching or contrasting petticoat. The skirt of the casaquin was knee-length but gradually shortened until by the 1780s it resembled a peplum.

The loose box pleats which are a feature of this style are sometimes called Watteau pleats from their appearance in the paintings of Antoine Watteau. The various Watteau terms, such as Watteau pleat, Watteau back, Watteau gown etc., date from the mid-19th century rather than reflecting authentic 18th century terminology, and normally describe 19th and 20th century revivals of the sack-back.

== Notable wearers ==
A popular story, traced back to the correspondence of Élisabeth Charlotte d'Orléans, Duchess d'Orléans, is that the earliest form of the sack-back gown, the robe battante, was invented as maternity clothing in the 1670s by Louis XIV's mistress to conceal her clandestine pregnancies. However, people would comment: "Madame de Montespan has put on her robe battante, therefore she must be pregnant." A similar story is associated with Marie Louise Élisabeth d'Orléans, Duchess of Berry, who during the French Regency of 1715–1723 was known for wearing this style of gown which showcased her bosom and face whilst, as with Madame de Montespan, disguising illicit pregnancies.

== Galleries ==
=== 18th century ===
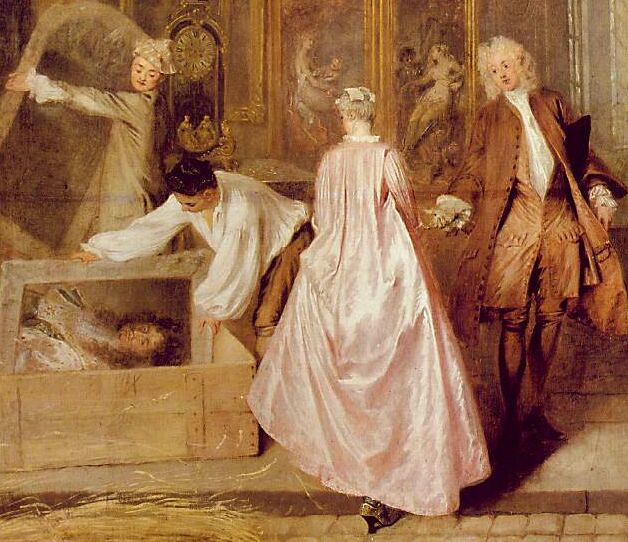
L'Enseigne de Gersaint (detail), 1720, by Antoine Watteau. Early example of a sack-back gown.

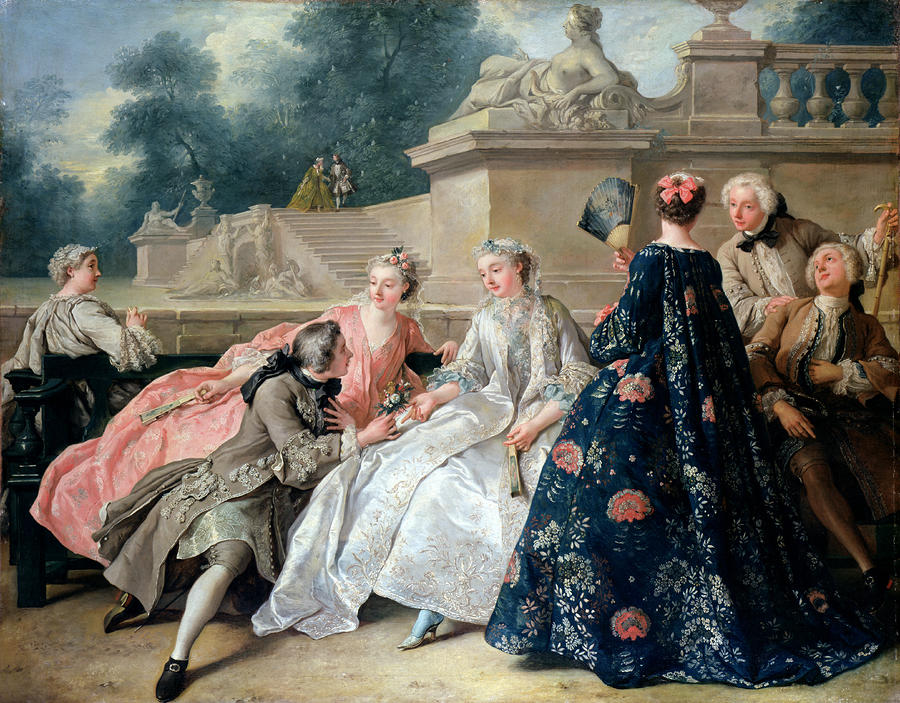
La Déclaration d'amour, 1731, by Jean François de Troy. Front and back views of women in sack-back gowns.

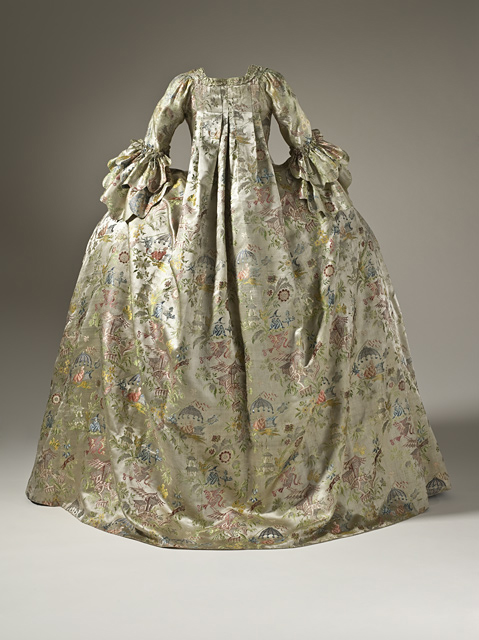
Robe à la française, Netherlands, silk satin brocaded with silk and metallic threads, 1740-60. LACMA M.2007.211.928

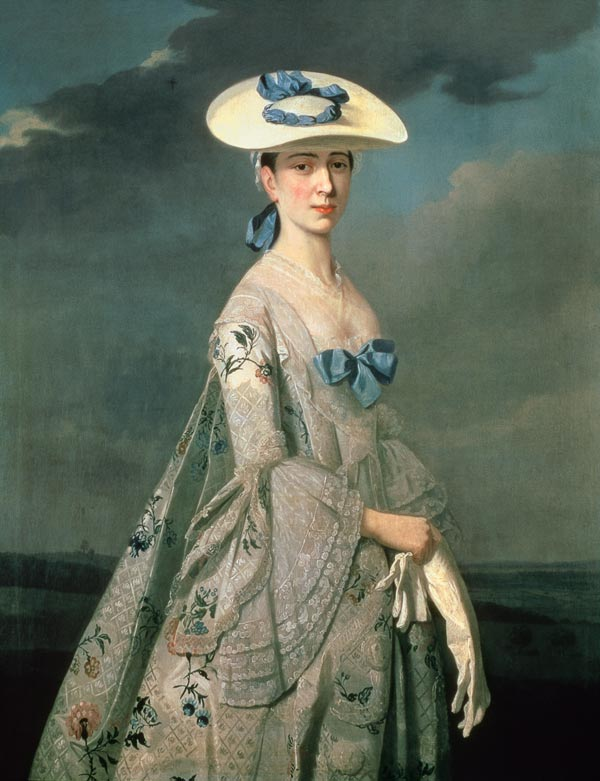
Eleanor Frances Dixie, c. 1753, by Henry Pickering. The sitter is wearing a bergère hat and a brocaded silk sack-back gown.

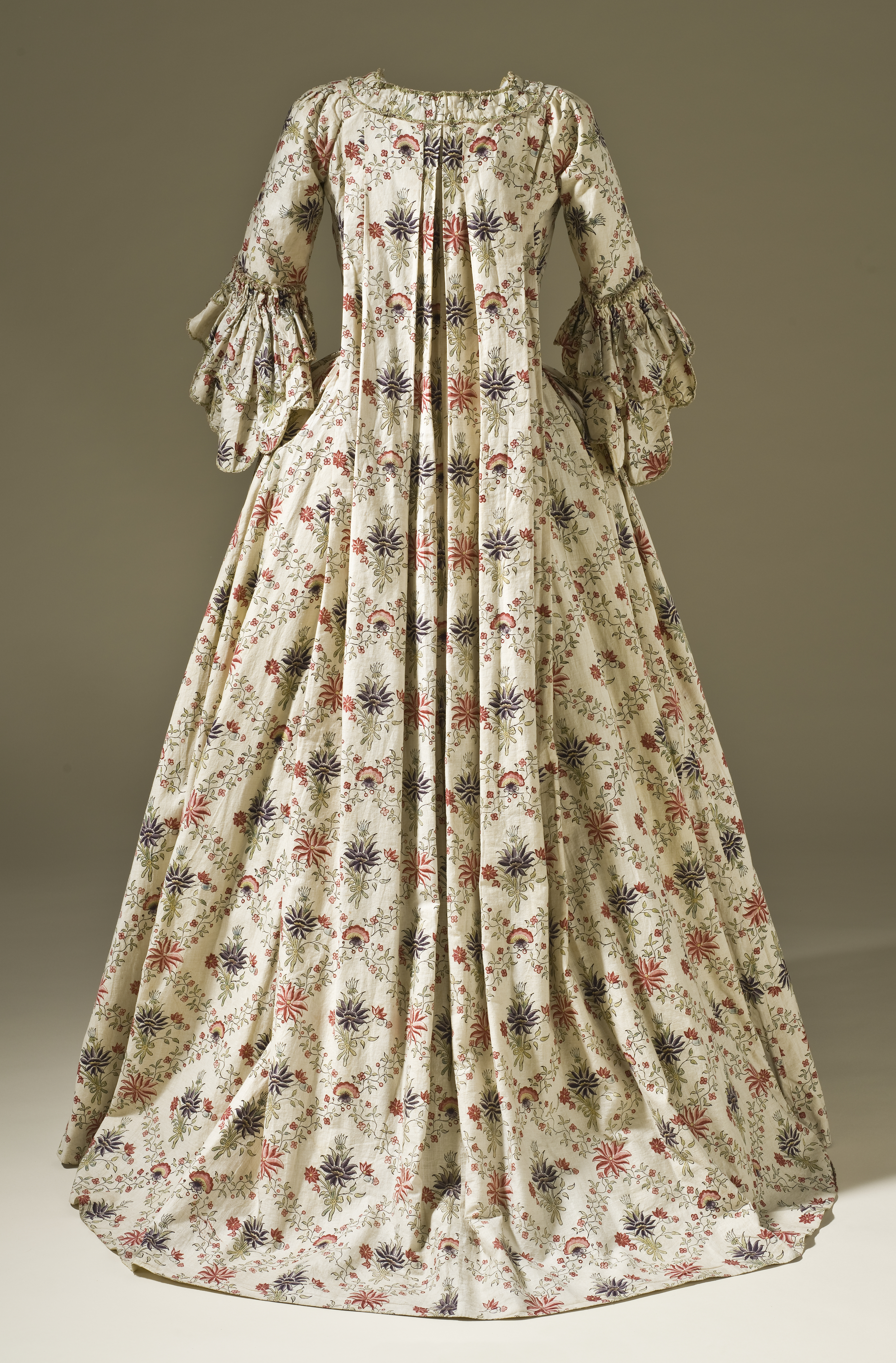
Robe à la française, France, block-printed cotton, c. 1770. LACMA M.2007.211.718

=== Post-18th century revival styles ===
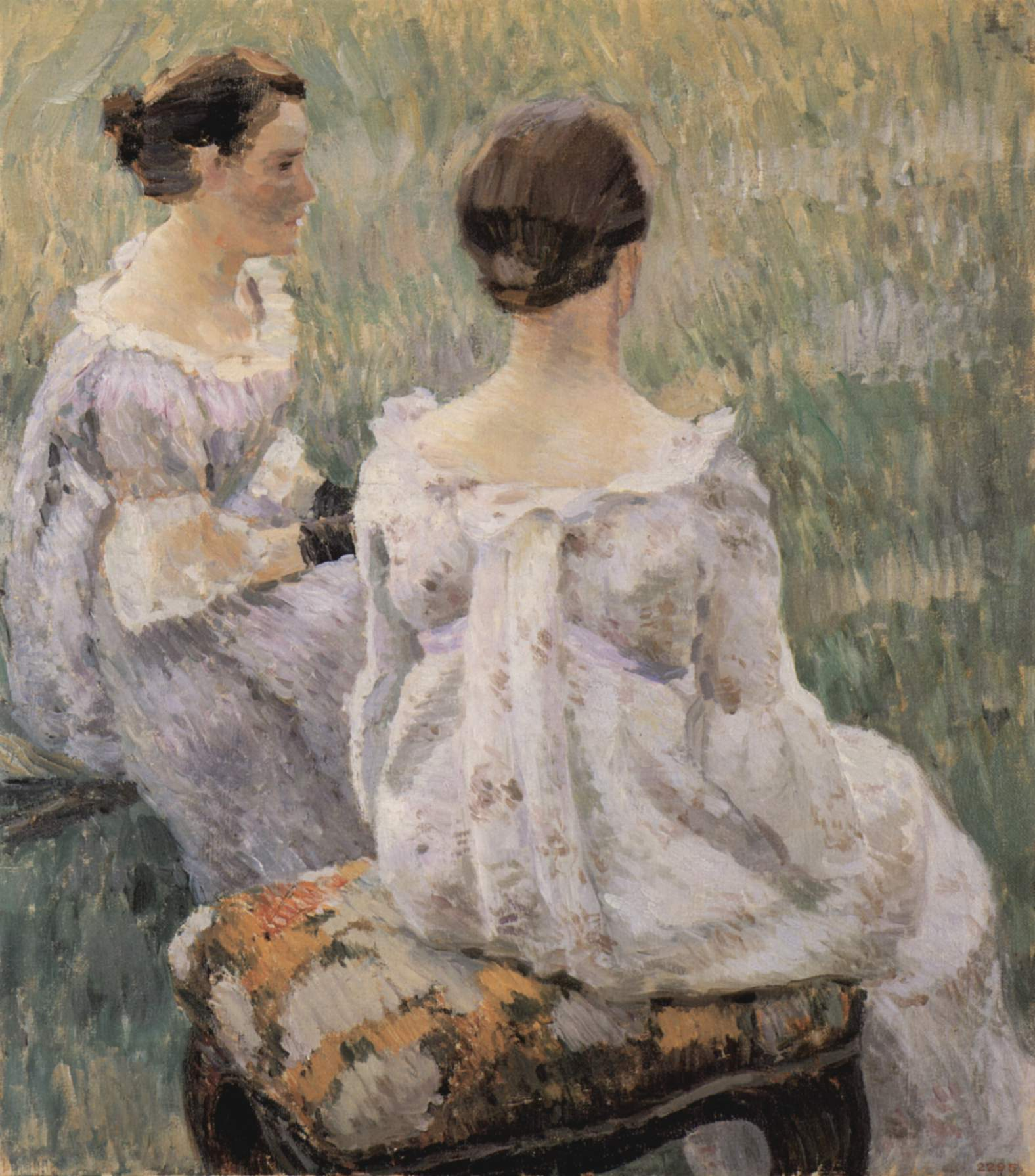
Two women in Watteau back gowns, painted by Victor Borisov-Musatov, Russia, 1899.

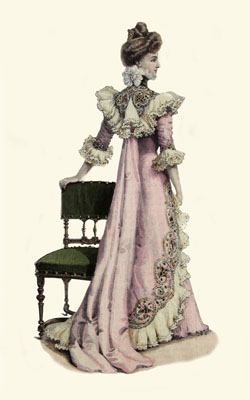
Tea gown with a Watteau back, December 1899. Published in La Mode illustré.

== See also ==
- 1700–1750 in fashion
- 1750–1775 in fashion

== Bibliography ==
- Arnold, Janet. Patterns of Fashion 1: Englishwomen's dresses & their construction c. 1660–1860. Drama Publishers, 1977. ISBN 0-89676-026-X
- Burnston, Sharon Ann. Fitting and Proper: 18th Century Clothing from the Collection of the Chester County Historical Society. Scurlock Pub Co, 2000. ISBN 1-880655-10-1
- Hart, Avril, and Susan North. Seventeenth and Eighteenth-Century Fashion in Detail. V&A Publishing, 2009. ISBN 1-85177-567-6
- Jackson, Anna, ed. (2001). V&A: A Hundred Highlights. V&A Publications.
- Ribeiro, Aileen: The Art of Dress: Fashion in England and France 1750–1820, Yale University Press, 1995, ISBN 0-300-06287-7
- Ribeiro, Aileen: Dress in Eighteenth Century Europe 1715–1789, Yale University Press, 2002, ISBN 0-300-09151-6
