= Train (clothing) =

Long back-portion of a formal garment that trails behind the wearer

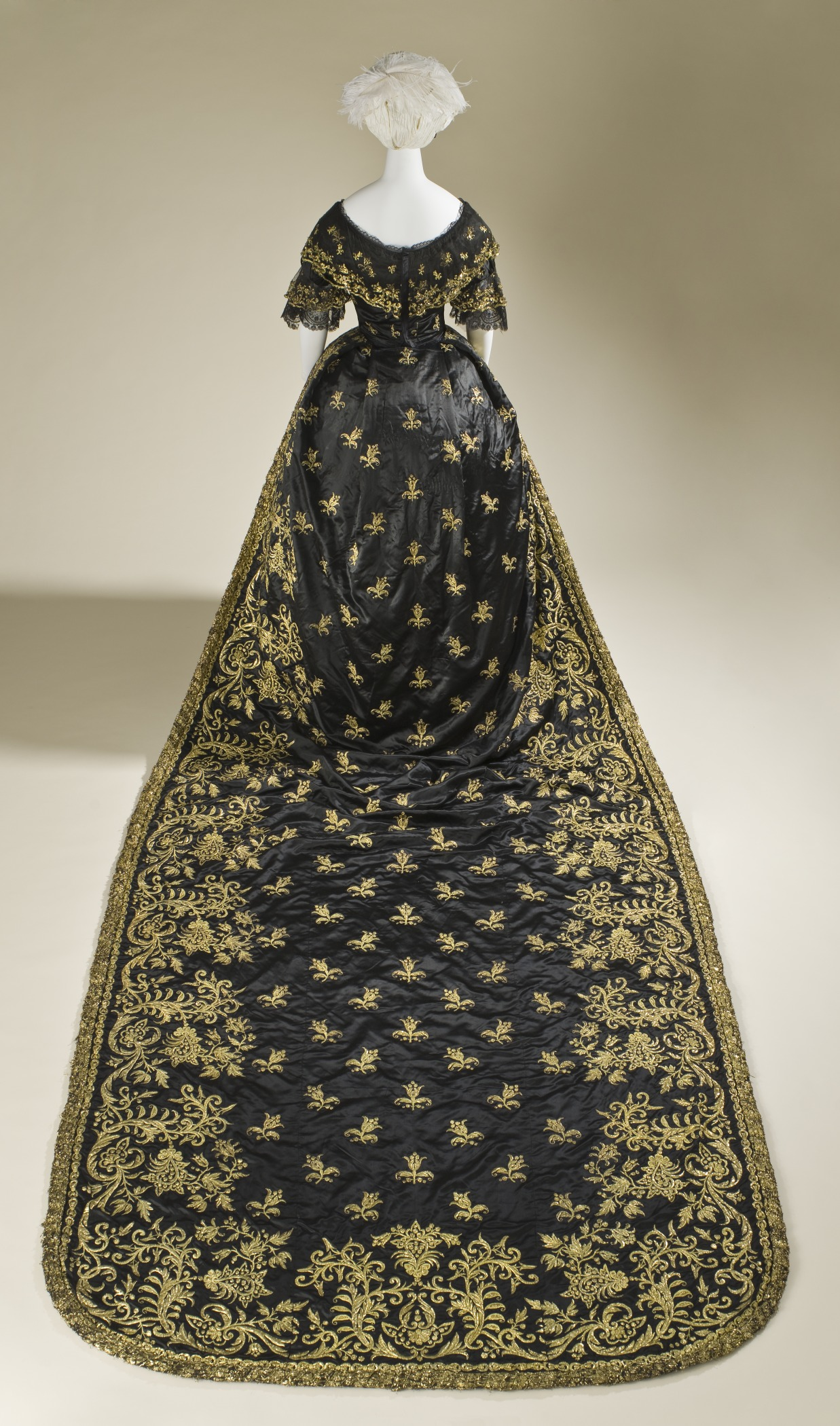
Court dress with long train. Portugal, c.1845

In clothing, a train describes the long back portion of a robe, coat, cloak, skirt, overskirt, or dress that trails behind the wearer.

It is a common part of ceremonial robes in academic dress, court dress or court uniform. It is also a common part of a woman's formal evening gowns or wedding dresses.

== Types of train ==
=== Fashion ===
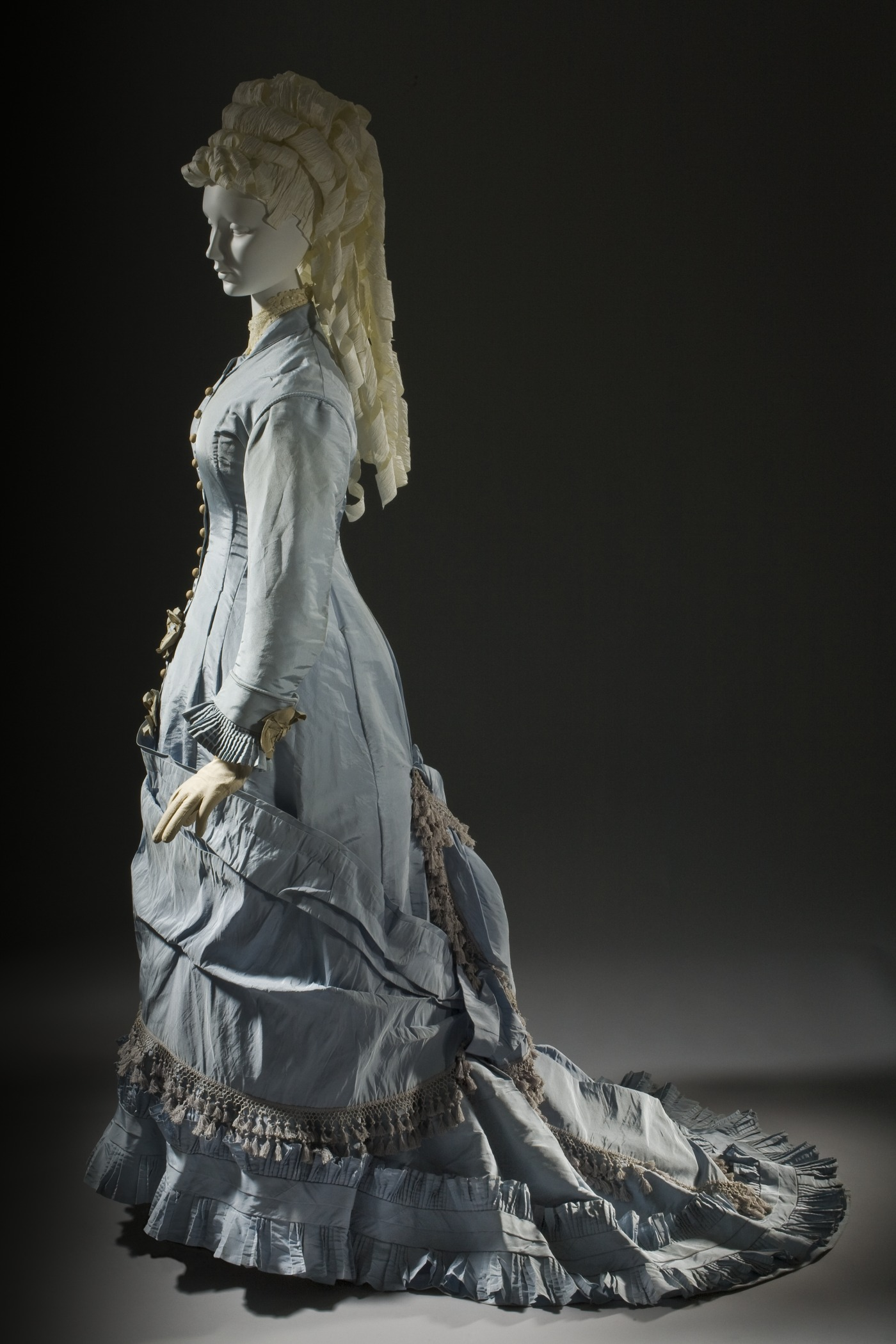
Dress with a fishtail train, French, c. 1880, LACMA

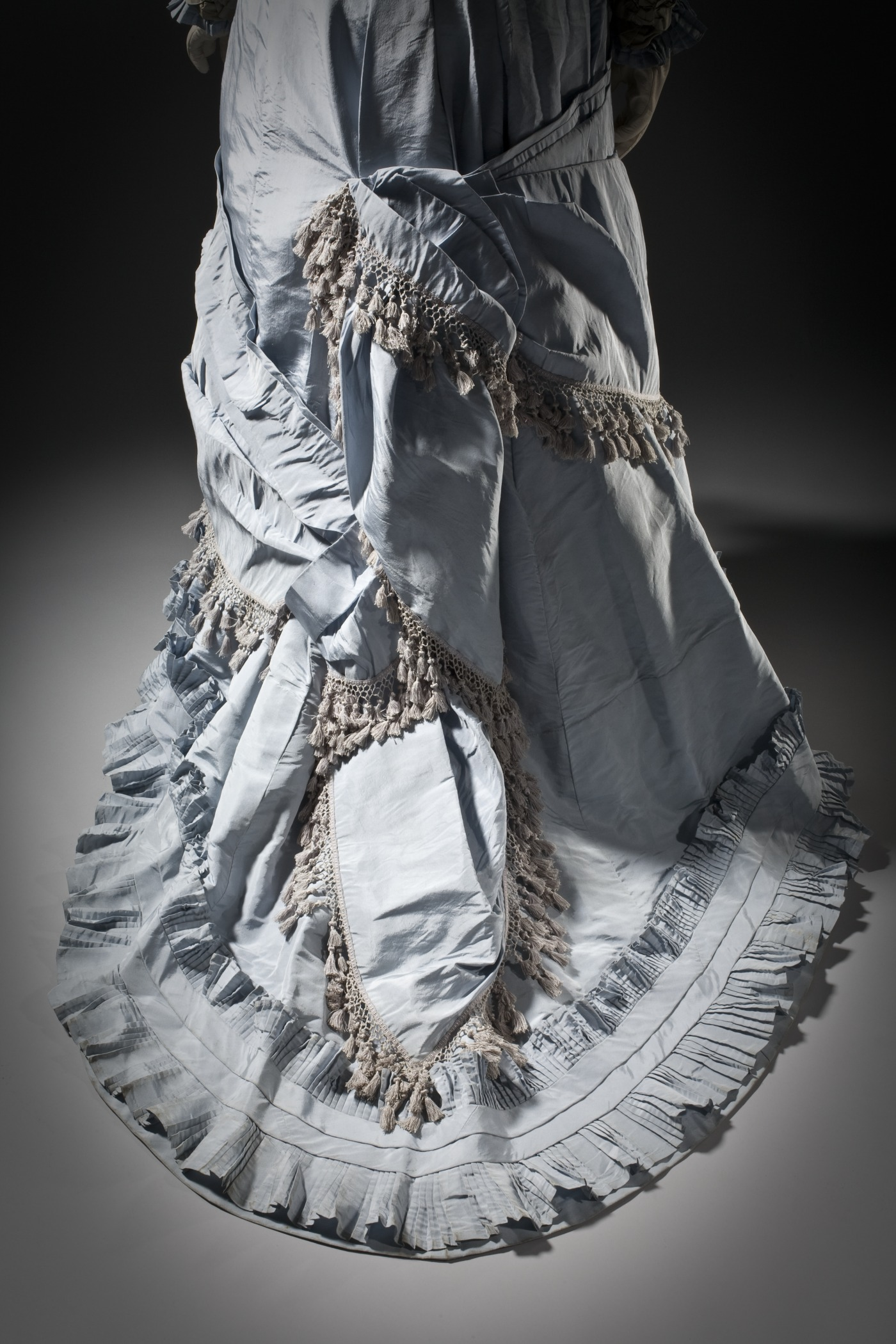
Detail of the previous dress

- Court train – worn for formal court occasions, the court train had to fall in with strict dress codes which differed from court to court. For example, the French court code set in 1804 by Jean-Baptiste Isabey prescribed a four-inch maximum width for embroidered train borders for non-Royal wearers. In Britain it was required to be three yards in length at the minimum.
- Double train – two trains attached to the same dress, or a single train divided into two trains.
- Fishtail train – a train popular at various times from the 1870s onwards, flaring out from midway down a close-fitting skirt.
- Demi-train – a short train formed by having the back of the garment slightly longer than the front.

=== Wedding dress ===
Trains in modern (20th and 21st century) bridal wear have their own terminology:

- Cathedral train – also known as a monarch train, this can measure up to eight feet (2.4 metres). A royal cathedral train is considered the longest, most formal train, measuring up to ten feet (3.0 metres) or more.
- Chapel train – a medium length train up to five feet (1.1 to 1.5 metres) long.
- Court train – in bridal terminology, a court train is a narrow train extending 1 metre behind.
- Sweep train – a short train that does not necessarily reach the floor. It is so called because it might just sweep the ground.
- Watteau train – a modern version of the pleated backs (called 'Watteau pleats') seen in 18th century sack-back gowns.

Brides of the Ndebele people of South Africa traditionally wear long beaded trains hung from the shoulder, known as nyoga (snake).

== Trains as part of uniform ==
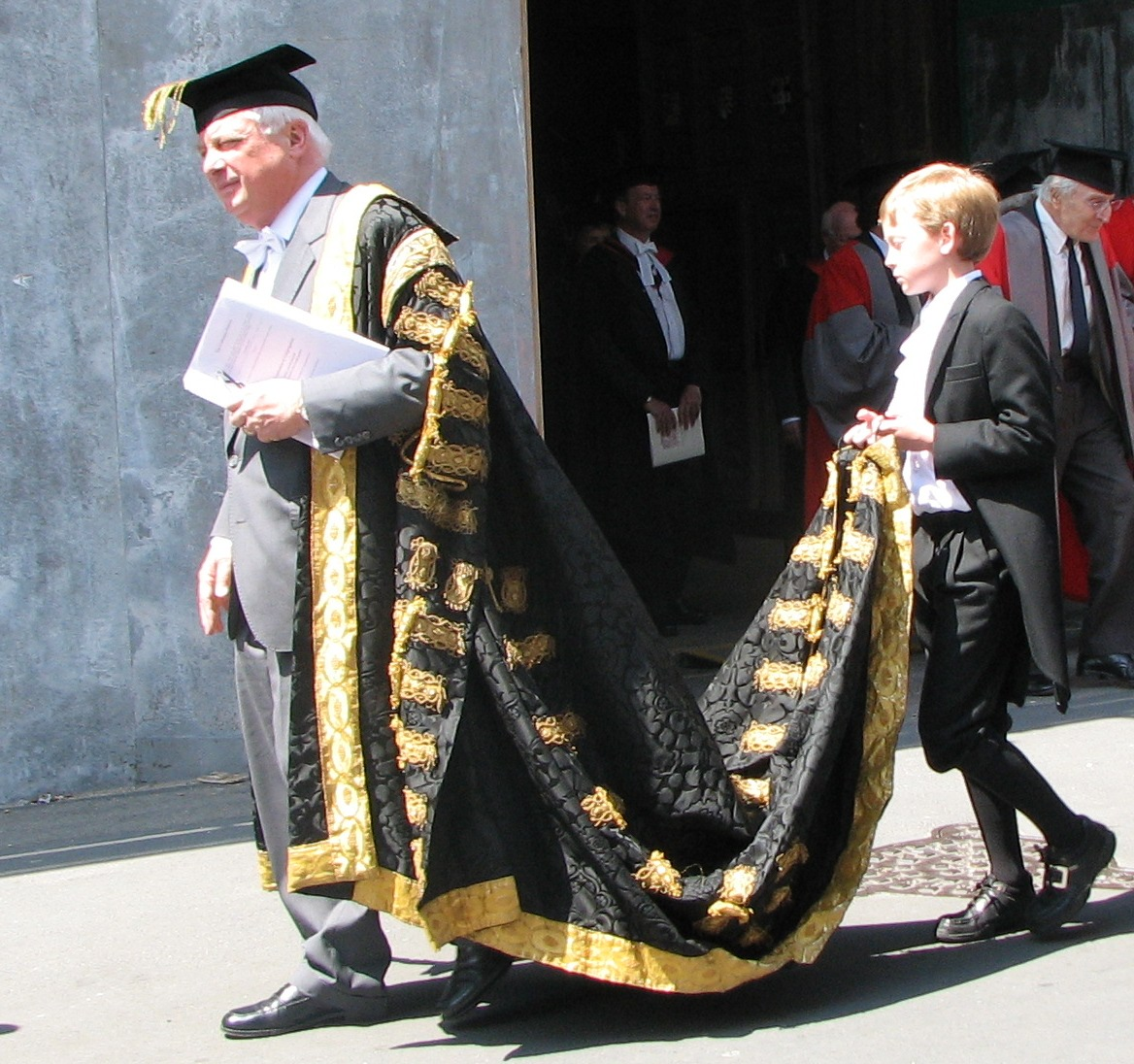
Chris Patten, Chancellor of the University of Oxford, wearing his official academic dress as the university chancellor

Trains are a common feature of the Royal mantles of Kings and Princes, as well as the mantles of many chivalric orders.

Officers of older, traditional universities generally wear distinctive and more elaborate dress. The Chancellor and the Vice-Chancellor may wear a black damask lay type gown with a long train. In France the train is now usually hooked to the inner side of the robe.

The Lord Chief Justice of England and Wales, when robed, dresses like a High Court Judge with the distinction of a train to their scarlet robe.

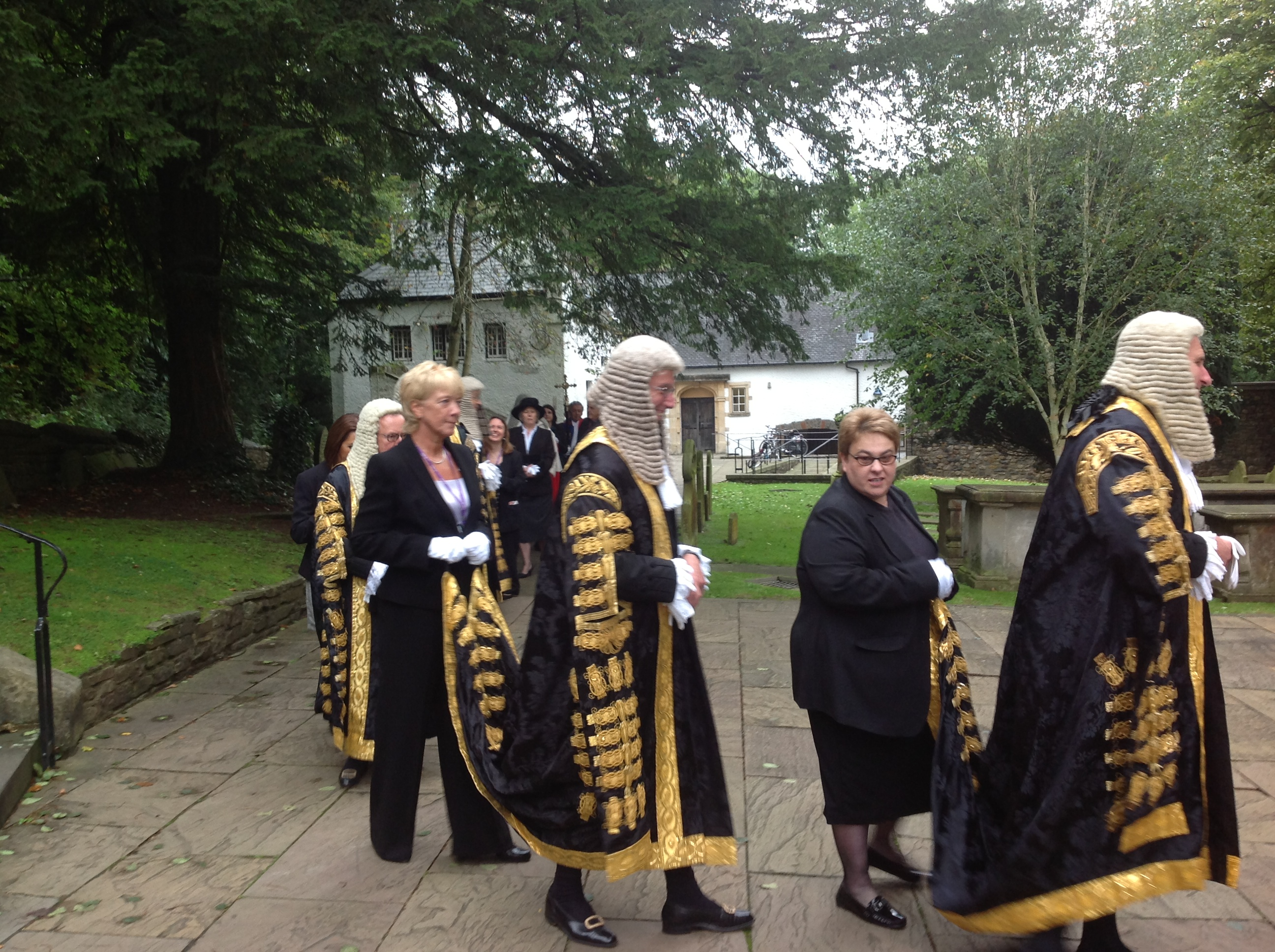
Lords Justices of Appeal, full ceremonial dress, 2013

Judges of the Court of Appeal wear the black silk damask gown, trained and heavily embellished with gold embroidery.

French court dress includes a train, now buttoned to the inside of the robe and suspended by fabric bands, a vestige of the former practice of lawyers carrying their trains.

The Lord Chancellor, the Speaker of the House of Commons, and other high dignitaries also wear similar embroidered black robes with trains.

The Lord Mayor of London also wears a robe with a train.

A trained robe, the cappa magna (great cape) remains in use in the Catholic Church for certain ceremonial occasions. Cardinals, bishops, and certain other honorary prelates are entitled to wear the cappa magna, but within the territory of their jurisdiction.

Eastern Orthodox bishops also traditionally use a cloak with a long train known as the Mandyas, which may have parallels with the development of the Catholic cappa magna.

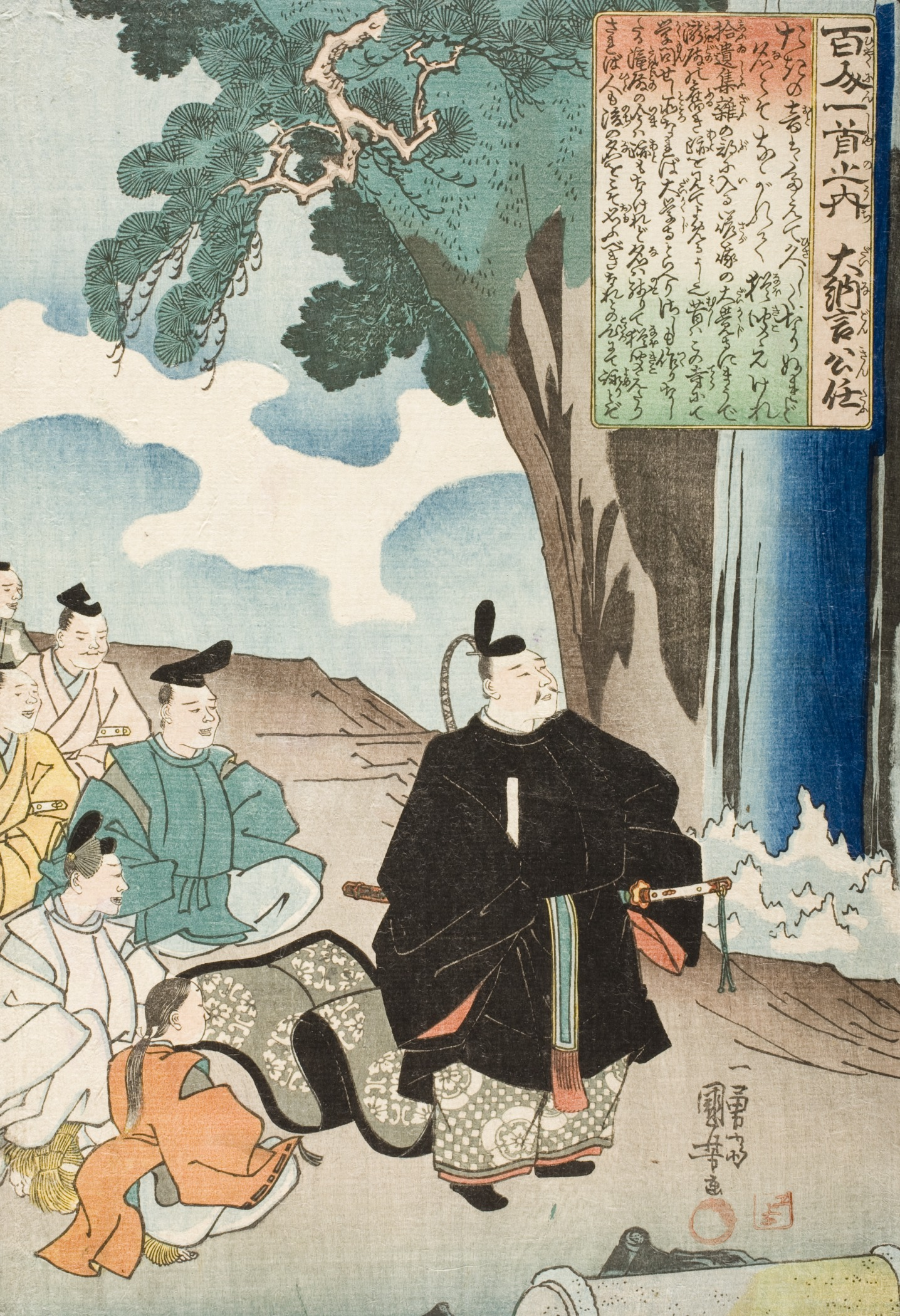
Japanese court attire with train

For male peers, the Coronation robe is a cloak of crimson velvet extending to the feet and open in the front (with white silk satin ribbon ties) with train trailing behind. The Parliament robe of a British peer is a full-length garment of scarlet wool with a collar of white miniver fur, cut long as a train, but this is usually kept hooked up inside the garment.

Court dresses for women were commonly fifteen yards in length. Court dresses for noble women sometimes had trains both behind and in front of the dress.

Examples of Japanese Imperial court clothing, such as sokutai for men and jūnihitoe for women, include a long train extending from the back of the robe. They are still in use by the Imperial Household of Japan for ceremonial occasions.

== History ==
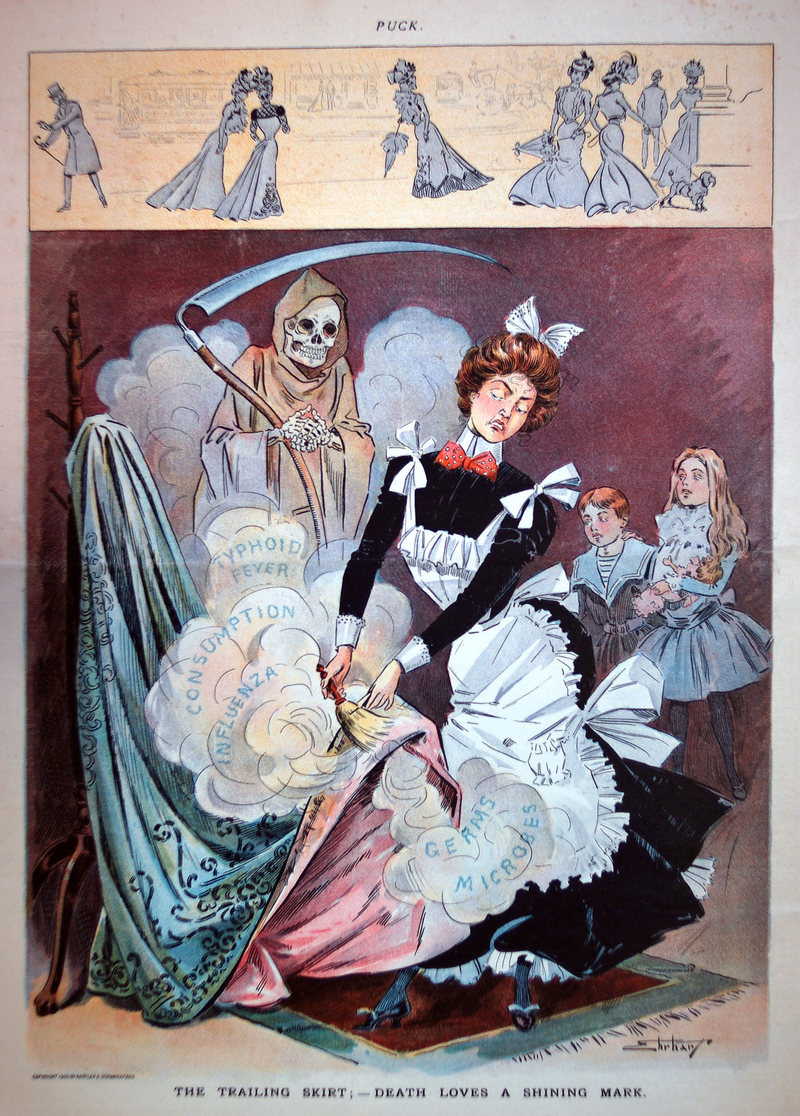
Cartoon showing how trailing skirts can transmit diseases. Published in Puck, August 8, 1900.

Trains declined in popularity in the late nineteenth century when they were targeted by public health campaigns in Europe and the United States that argued they brought germs from the streets into the wearers' homes. The issue was the subject of a cartoon published in Puck in 1900 entitled "The Trailing Skirt: Death Loves a Shining Mark."

== Gallery ==
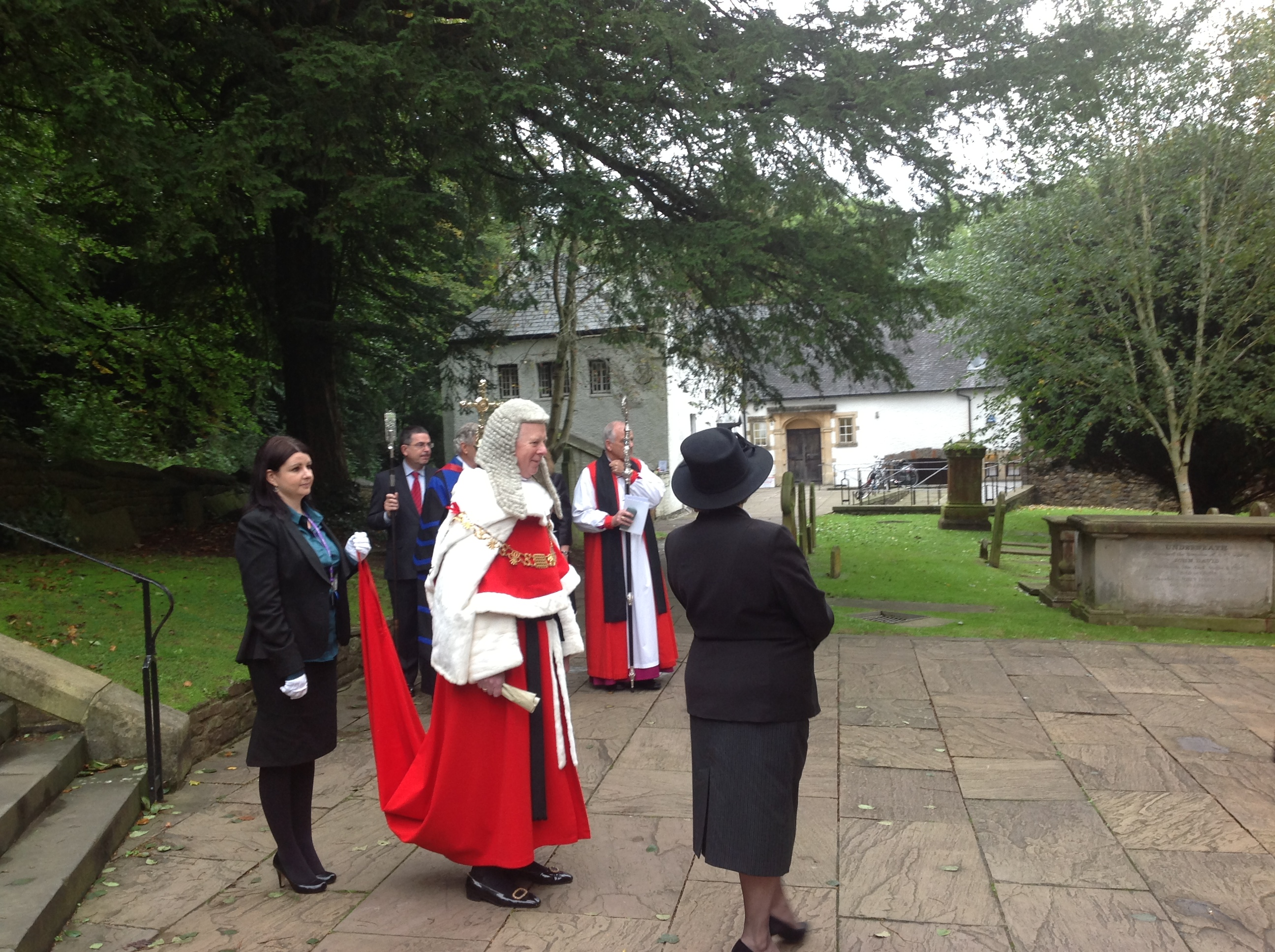
The Lord Chief Justice, 2013

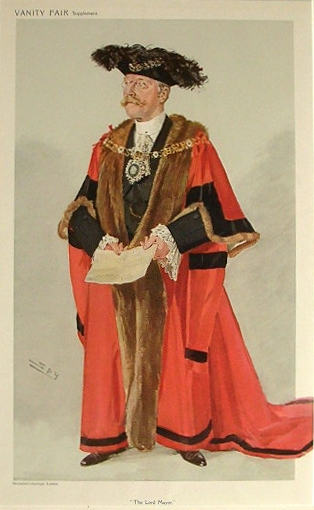
The scarlet robe, with train, depicting the Lord Mayor of London

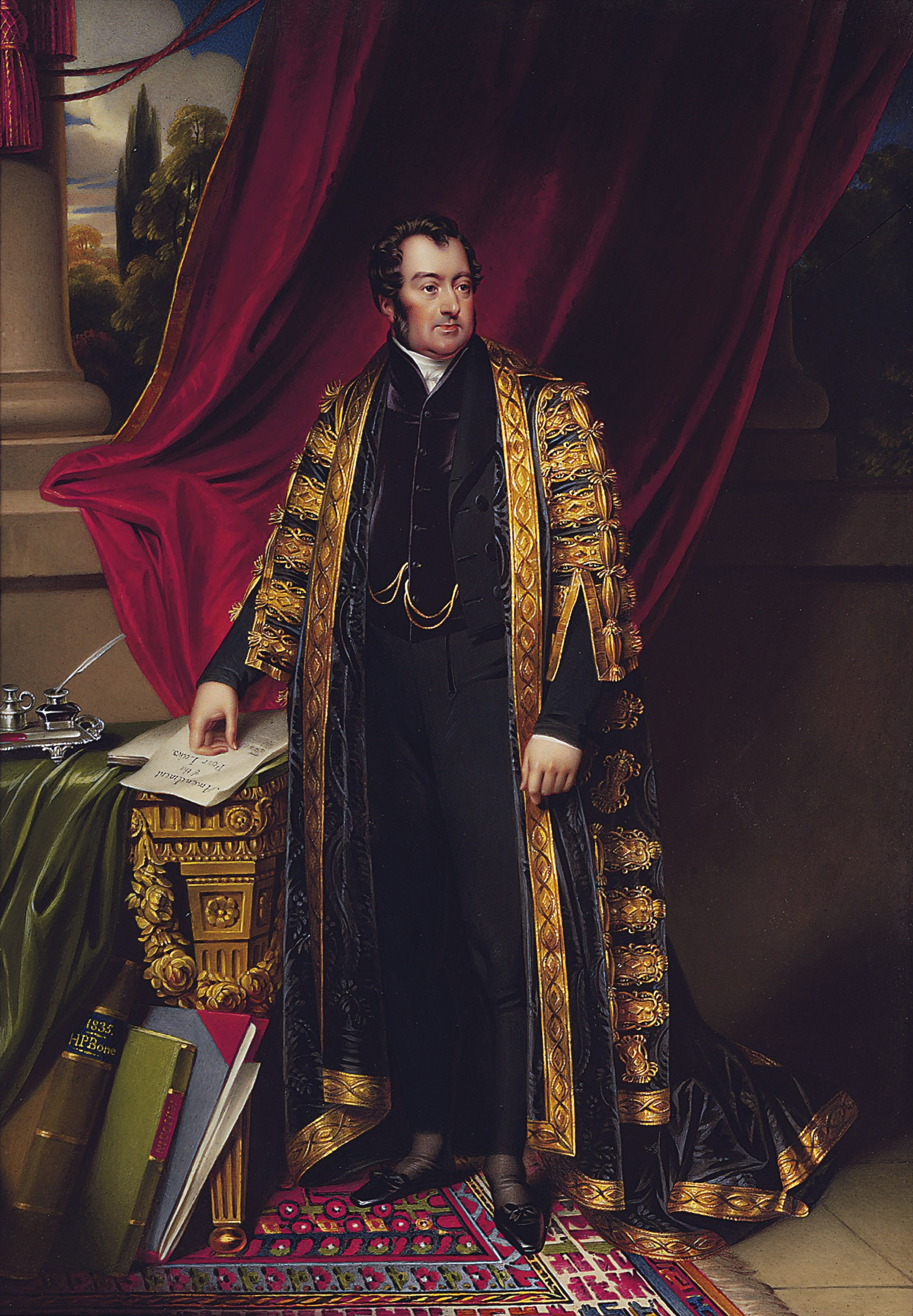
Chancellor of the Exchequer Robe of State

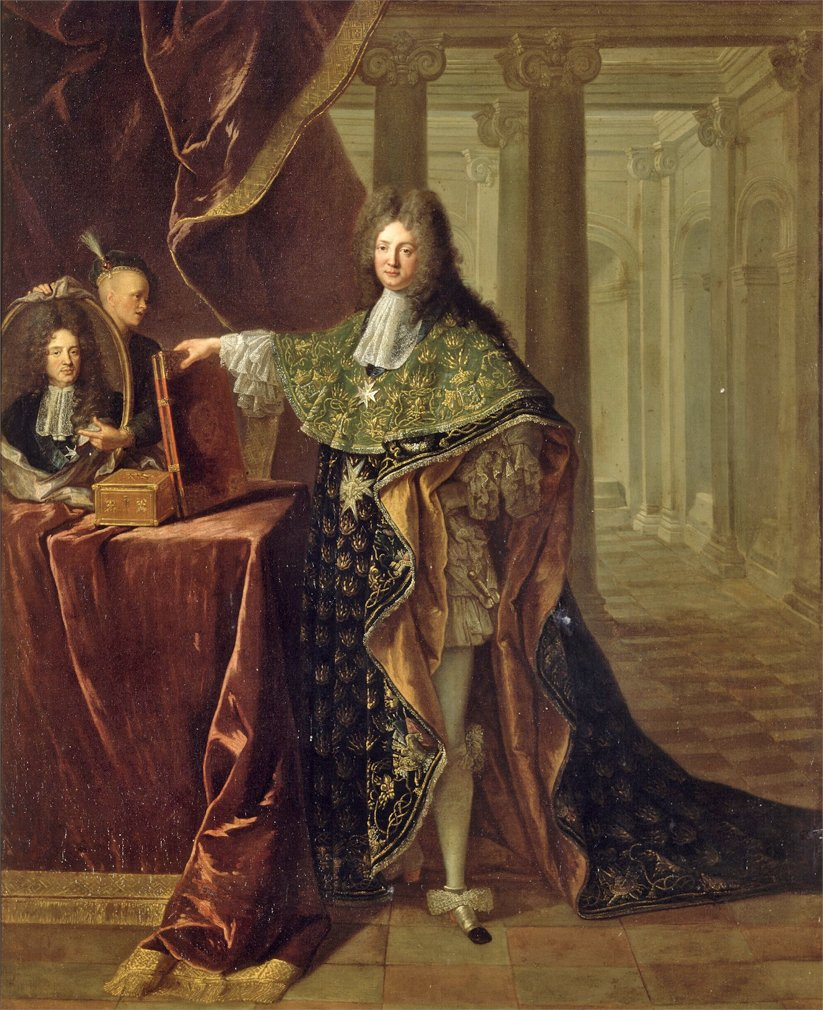
Mantle of the Knights of the Order of the Holy Spirit, France

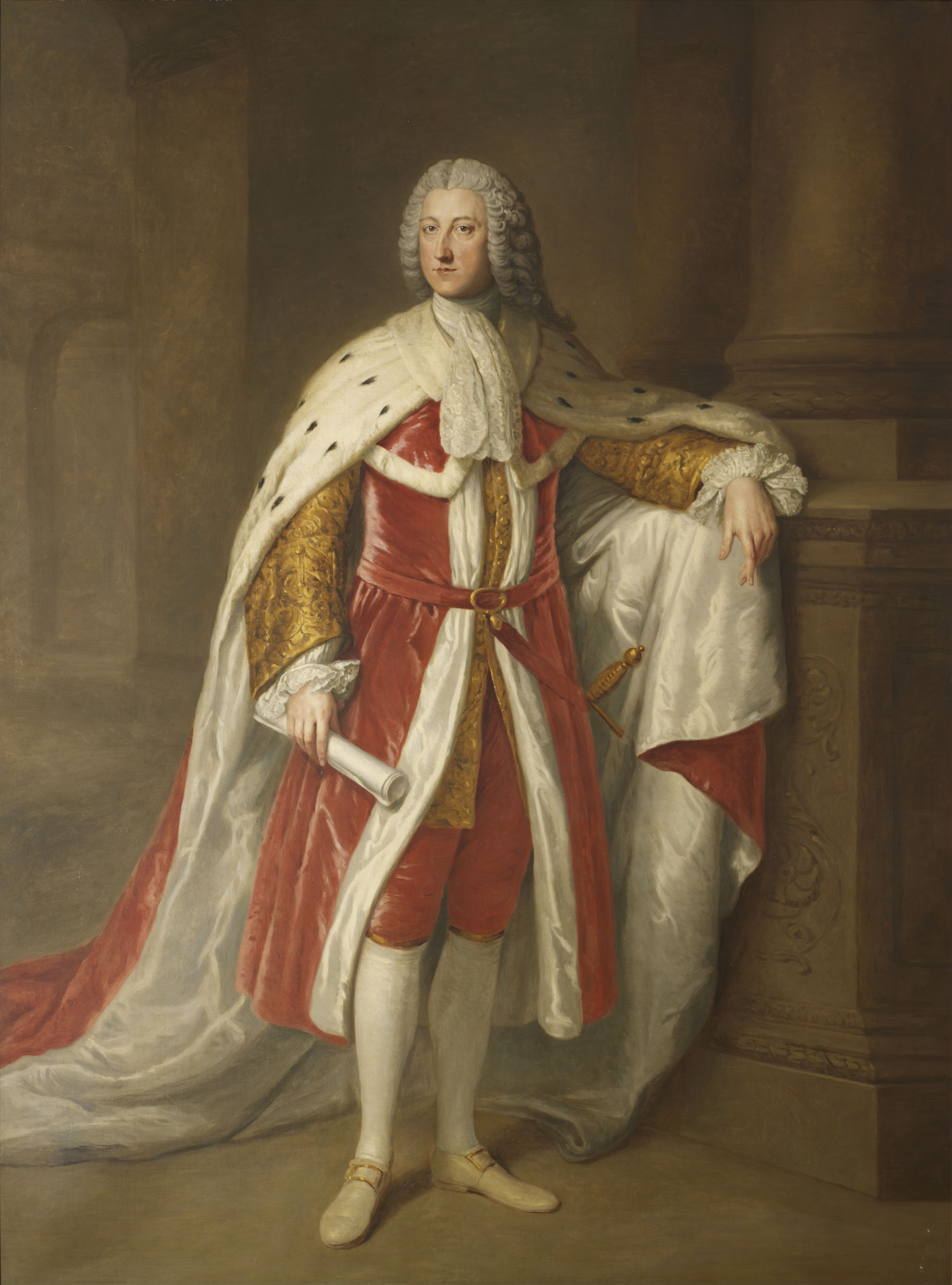
Coronation robes of an earl, by William Pitt

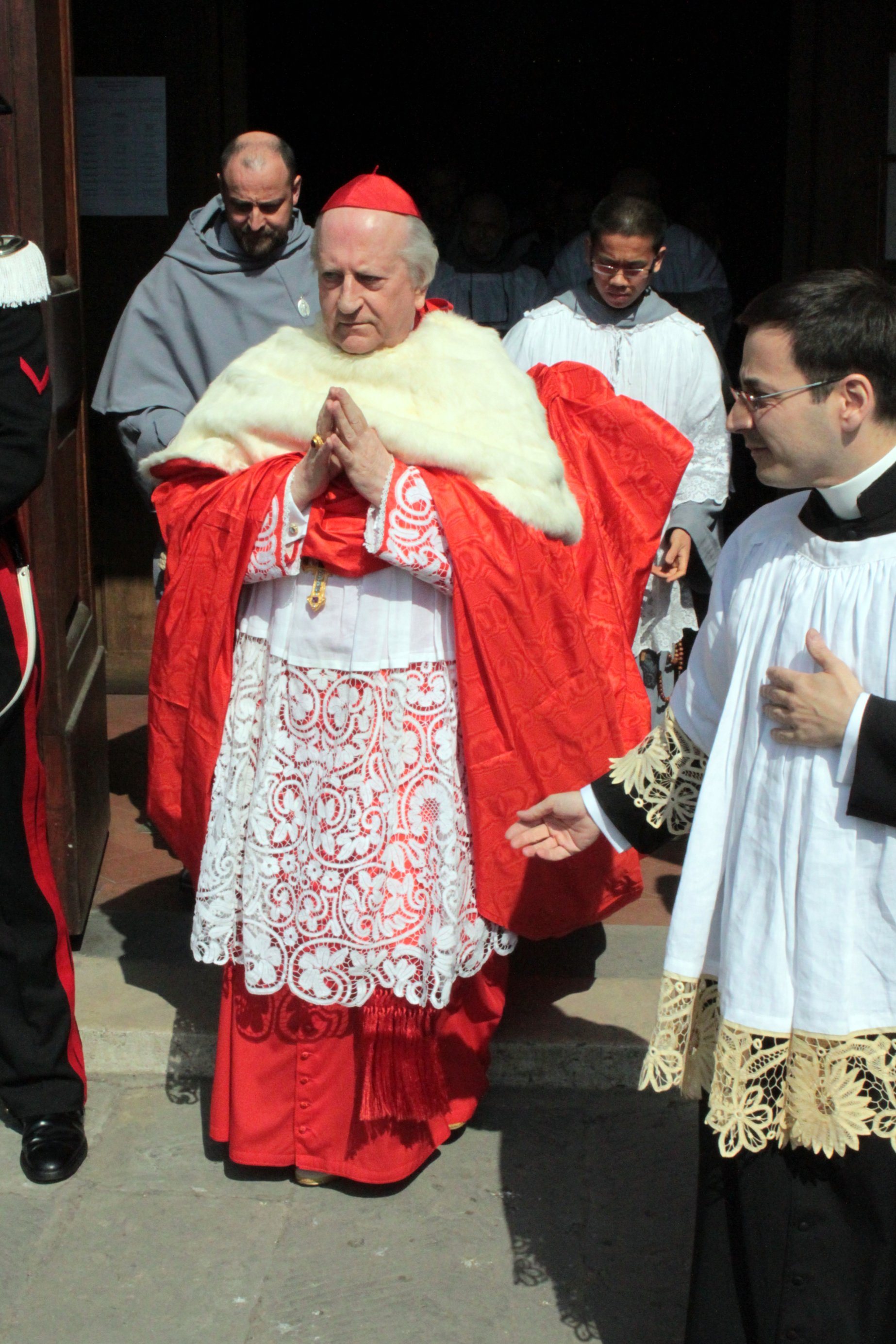
Cardinal Rode wearing a winter cappa magna

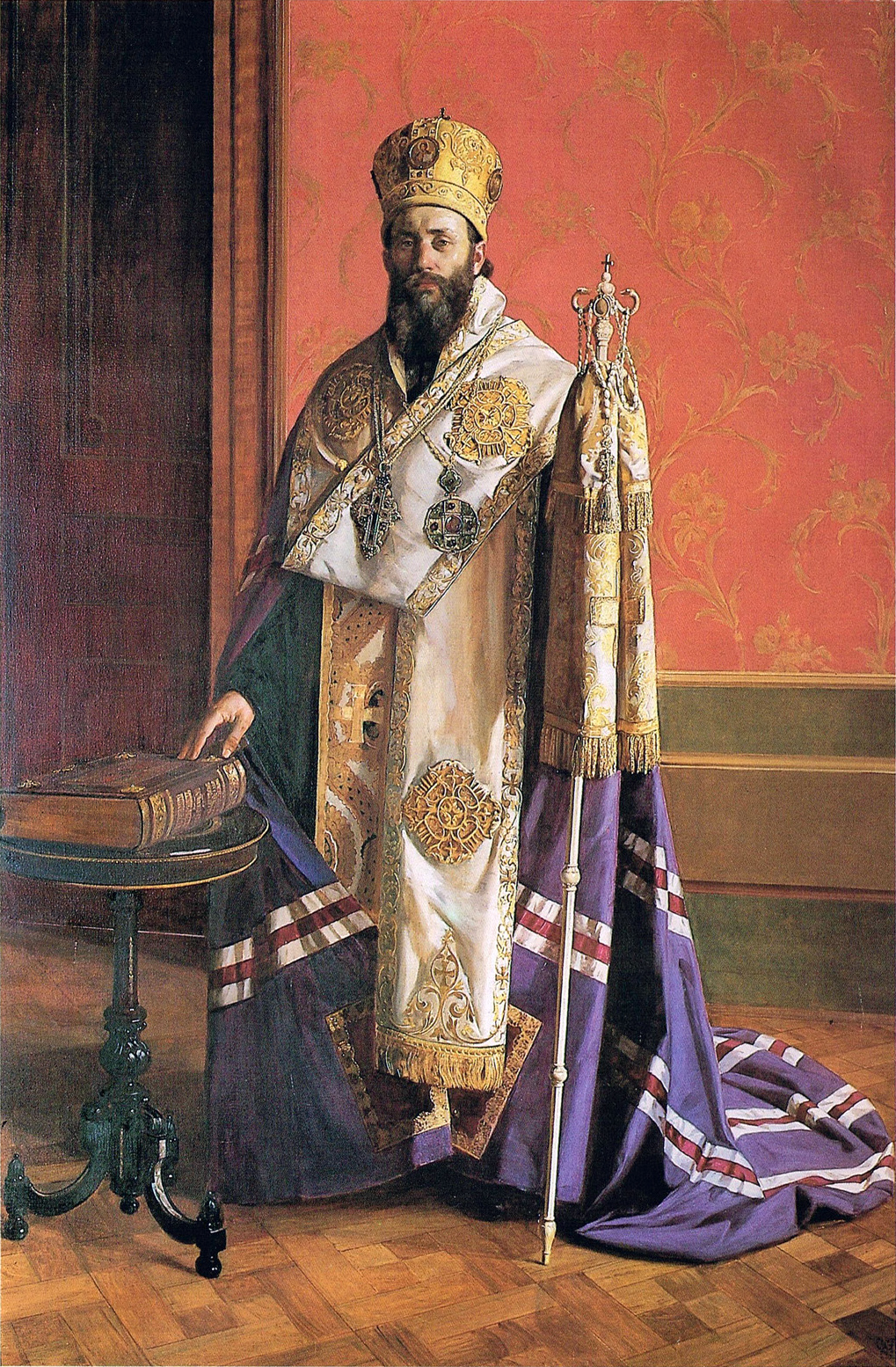
Serbian Orthodox bishop in mandyas

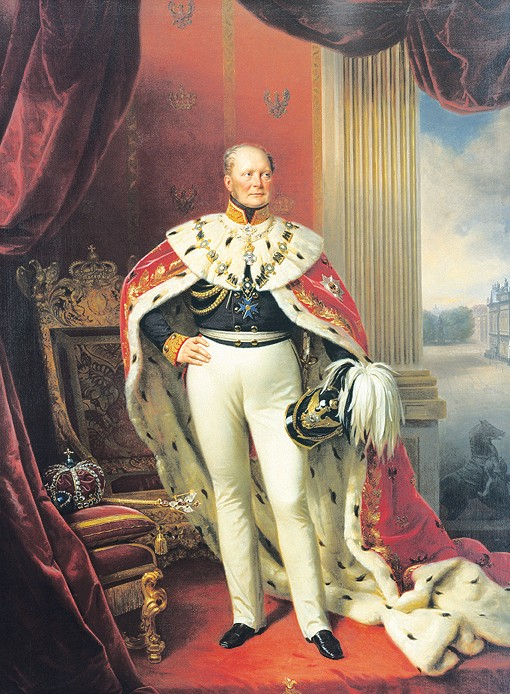
King Frederick William IV of Prussia in mantle

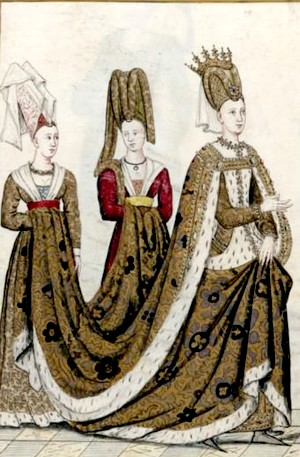
Isabeau of Bavaria with long ermine-lined train; c. late 14th century or early 15th century

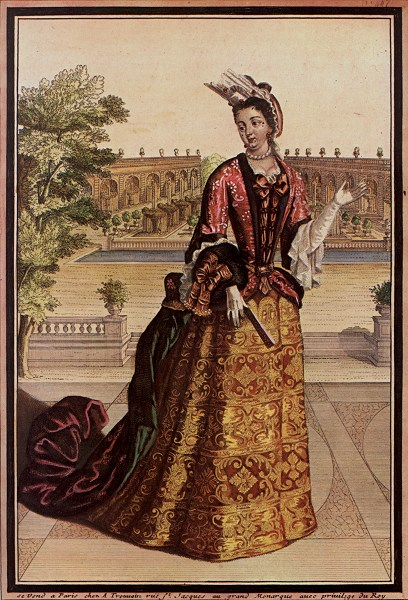
Mantua with train, 1698

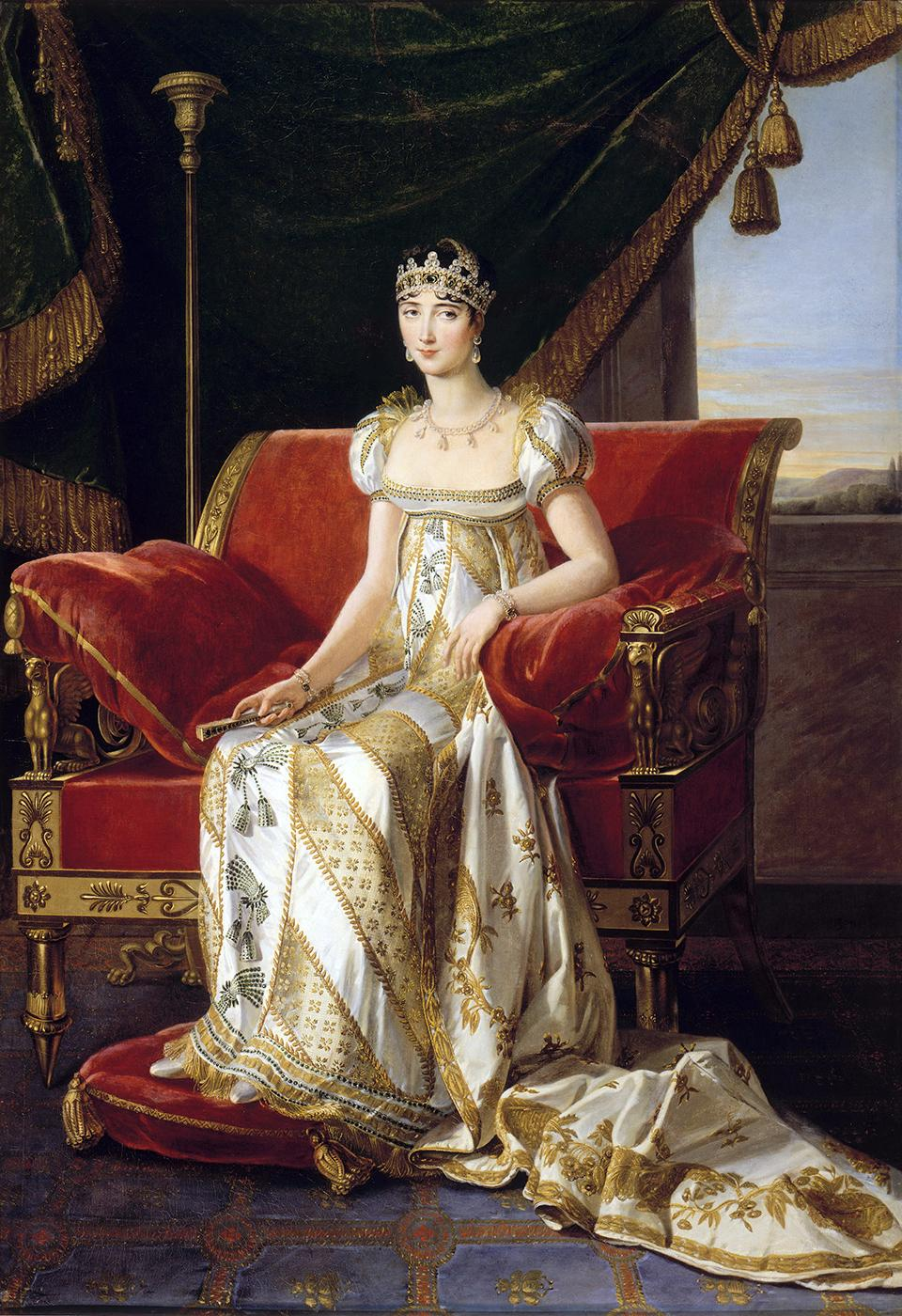
Pauline Bonaparte manteau de cour, a train attached at chest level, introduced by Napoleon, 1808

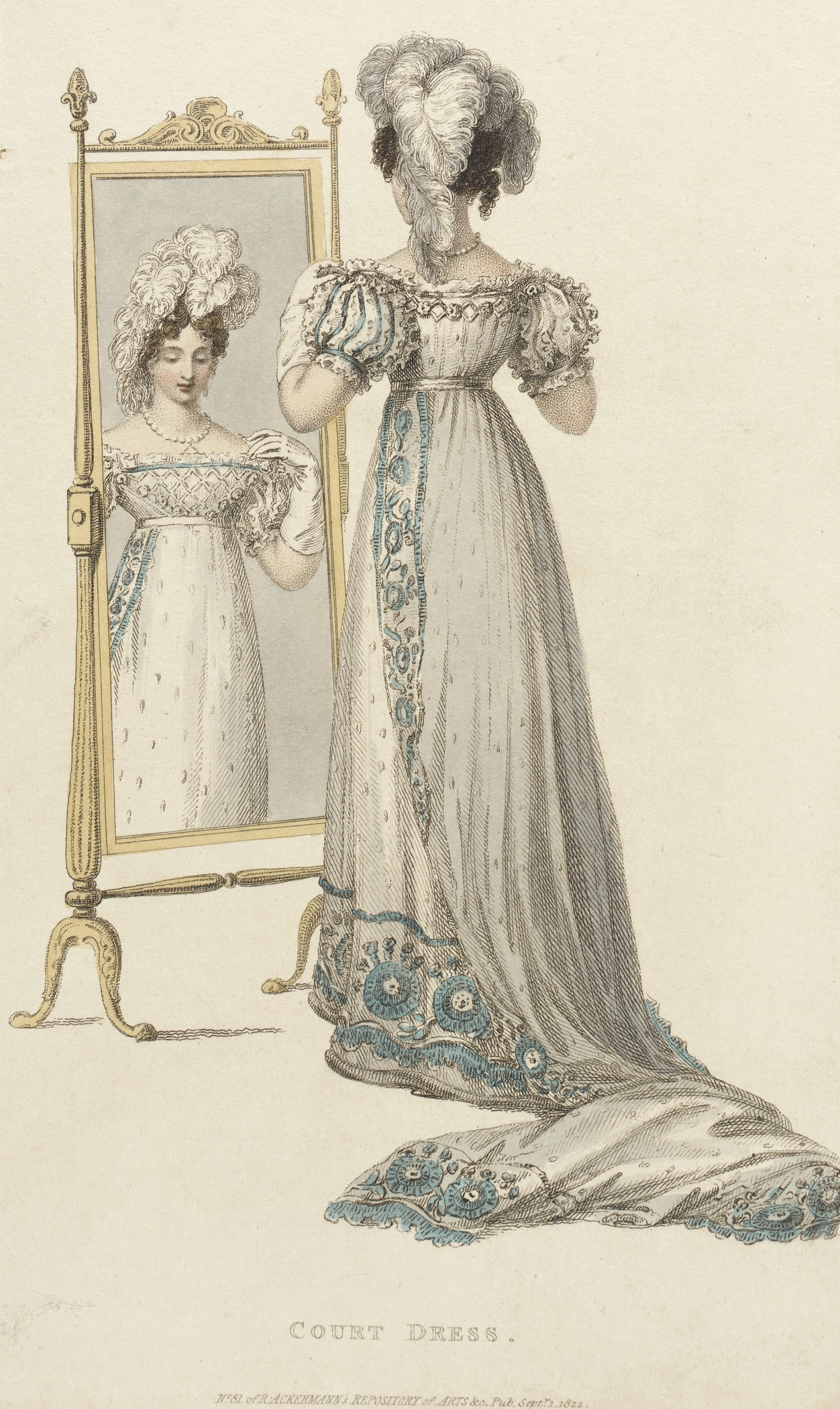
Court dress and train, English, 1822

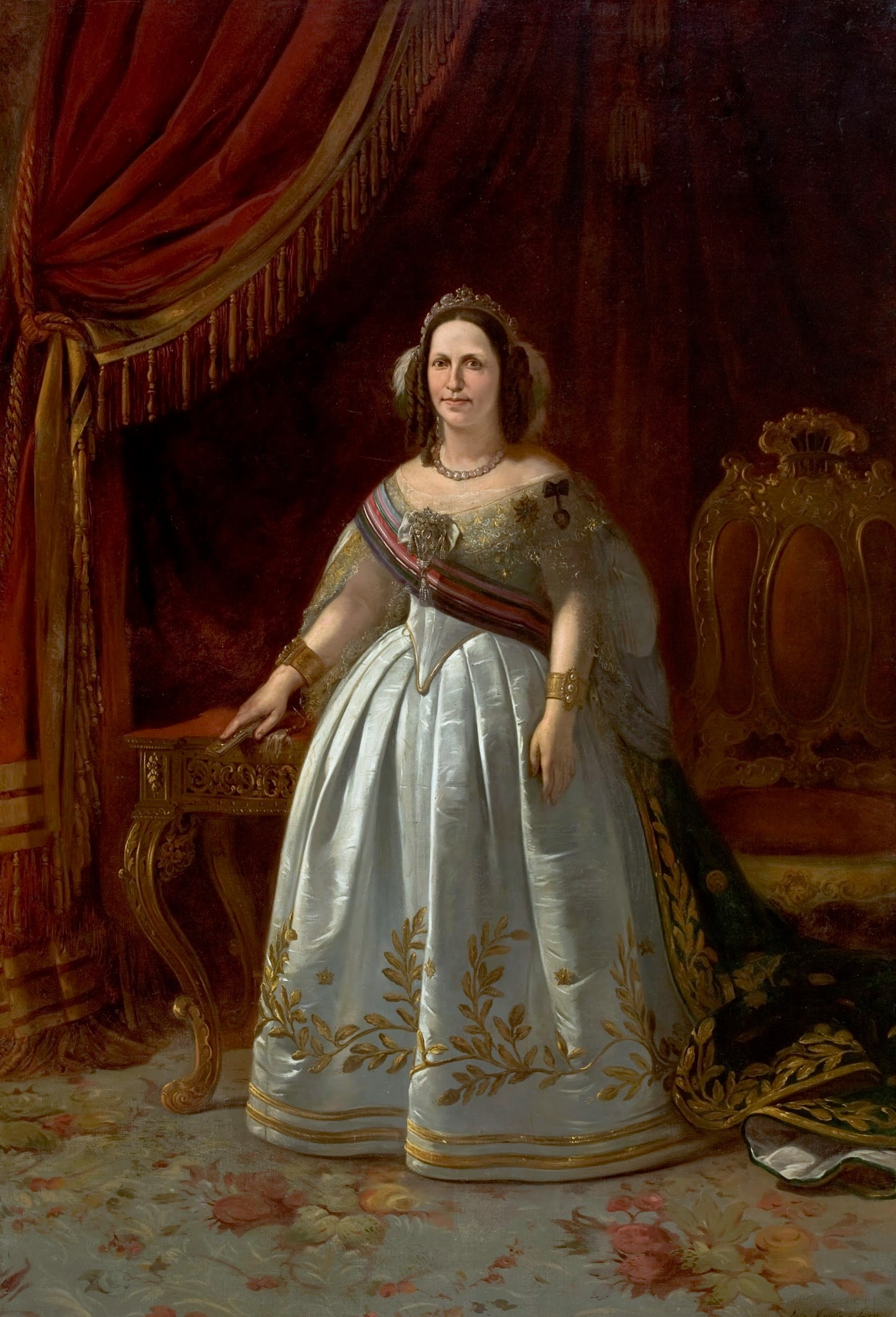
Empress Teresa Cristina of Brazil in court dress and train of green velvet with gold embroidery, 1864

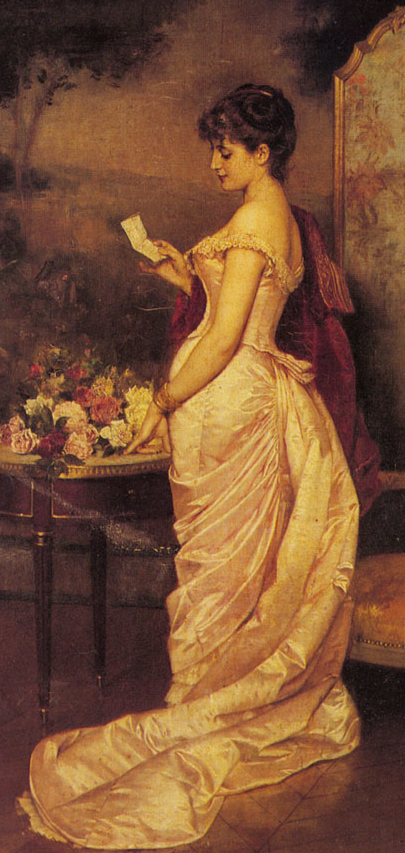
Evening gown with train, 1883

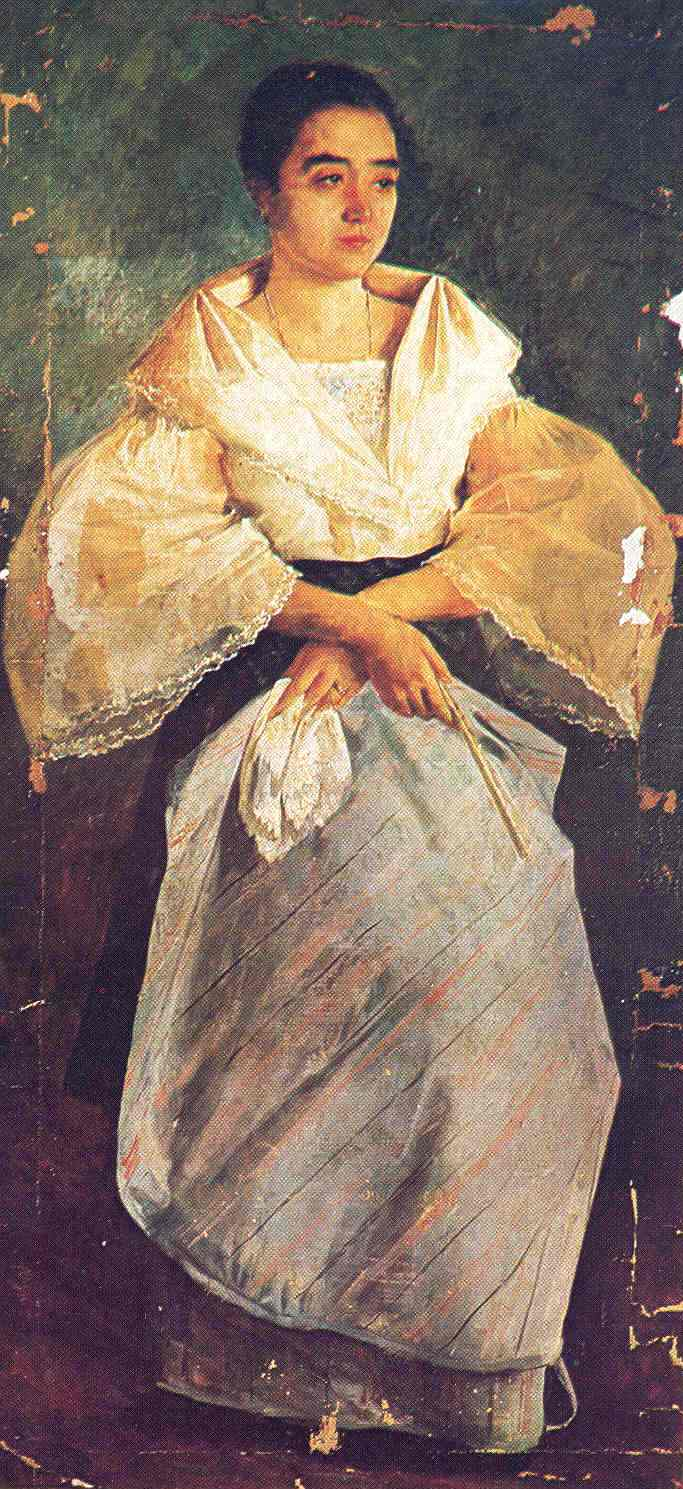
Saya de cola (lit. "skirt train") of the traje de mestiza during the late 19th century (erroneously referred to as a Maria Clara gown) from the Philippines. Note the manner of the woman's arms and hands, which depict the traditional method of holding the train at the time.

Court presentation dress and train, 1897

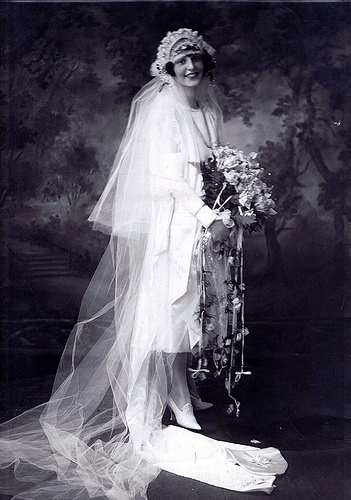
Short wedding dress with long train attached, 1920s

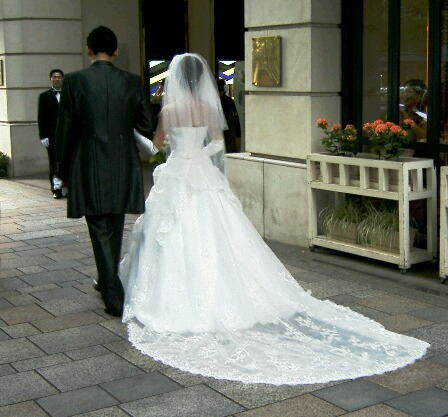
Japanese bride in a white dress with train, 2007
