= Bodice =

Clothing for women and girls

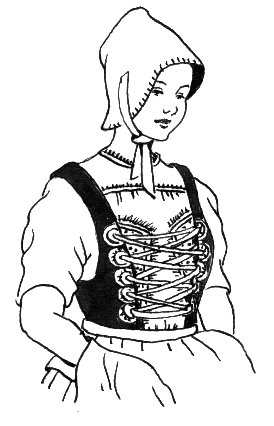
Line art drawing of a bodice

A bodice ( /ˈbɒdɪs/) is an article of clothing traditionally for women and girls, covering the torso from the neck to the waist. The term typically refers to a specific type of upper garment common in Europe during the 16th to the 18th century, or to the upper portion of a modern dress to distinguish it from the skirt and sleeves. The name bodice is etymologically an odd plural spelling of "body" and comes from an older garment called a pair of bodies (because the garment was originally made in two separate pieces that fastened together, frequently by lacing).

== Origin ==
Frescoes produced by the Minoan civilization portray women wearing open bodices that displayed and accentuated their breasts; however, following the Late Bronze Age collapse, these garments would give way to the simpler clothes characteristic of Iron Age Greece.

Contemporary European bodices are derived from the kirtle. A fitted bodice became fashionable in Europe around 1450.

== Construction ==
Bodices were typically built from an outer fashion fabric — commonly silk, velvet, wool, or linen— mounted over a sturdier lining of cotton or canvas that bore most of the structural strain. Rigidity was achieved with stiffening elements such as whalebone (baleen) or bents (a type of reed), sewn into channels to shape and support the torso. Until the later 17th century, the bodice of gown was often stiffened enough on its own to make a separate corset unnecessary; only towards the end of the century did rigid stays emerge as their own distinct undergarments, worn beneath an outer bodice or gown.

== Evolution of the term ==
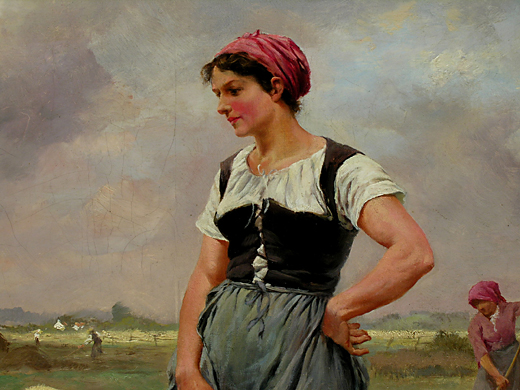
Countrywoman's bodice, 19th century (detail of The Hay-Harvest by Belgian painter Julien Joseph)

The same word is used to refer to several related concepts, some of which also have other names.

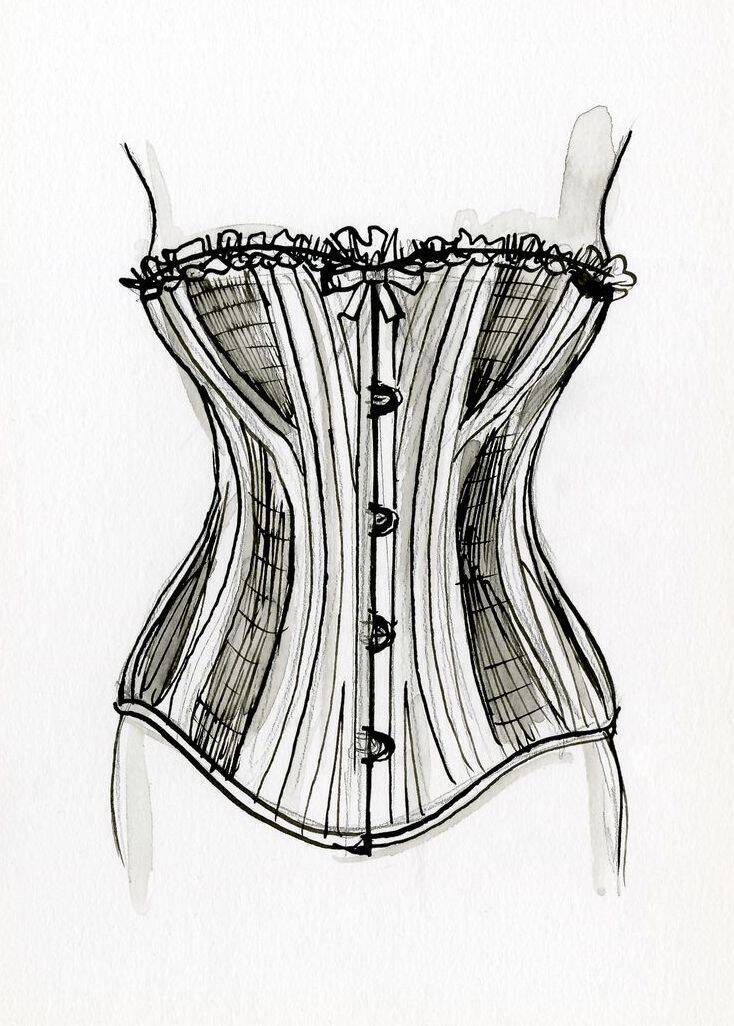
Sketch of a separate, corset-like bodice

In one usage, bodice refers to a separate upper garment that has removable sleeves or no sleeves, often low-cut, worn in Europe from the 16th century to the 18th century, either over a corset or in lieu of one. To achieve a fashionable shape and support the bust, the bodice was frequently stiffened with bents (a type of reed) or whalebone. The bodice was separate from the corset of the time because the bodice was intended to be worn over the other garments, and the others were undergarments.

In another usage, particularly in Victorian and early 20th century fashion, a bodice (in earlier sources, body) instead indicates the upper part of a dress that was constructed in two parts (i.e., with separate skirt and bodice, such as a ballet tutu), but of matching or coordinating fabric with the intention of wearing the two parts as a unit. In dressmaking, the term waist (sometimes called dress waist to distinguish it from a shirtwaist) was also used. During wear, the parts might be connected by hooks and eyes. This construction was standard for fashionable garments from the 18th century until the late 19th century, and had the advantages of allowing a voluminous skirt to be paired with a close-fitting bodice, and of allowing two or more bodices to be worn with the same skirt at different times. For example, a woman might wear the skirt with a matching high-necked bodice during the day, and later the same skirt with a different, fashionably low-necked bodice in the evening. One-piece construction became more common after 1900 due to the trend for looser, more simply-constructed clothing with narrower skirts.

Bodice continues in use to refer to the upper portion (not including the sleeves) of a one- or two-piece dress. The bodice of a dress was called the corsage in the 19th century.

== Styles ==
In earlier periods, bodices and corsets were laced in spiral fashion, with one continuous lace. Some bodices were laced in the back. In later periods, both were laced like the modern tennis shoe, with eyelets facing one another. This was more convenient for women who had to dress themselves. In the 20th century, lacing was replaced by elastic or other styles.

Padding, boning, and other techniques were used to keep the fitted bodice smooth while it was worn. Pregnant women wore an adjustable type of bodice, called a jump.

Starting in the 16th century, women used detachable sleeves as a fashion accessory. A ruff or other decorations might be added. By the 18th century, women were wearing a variety of accessories, including fichus and partlets, with their bodices.

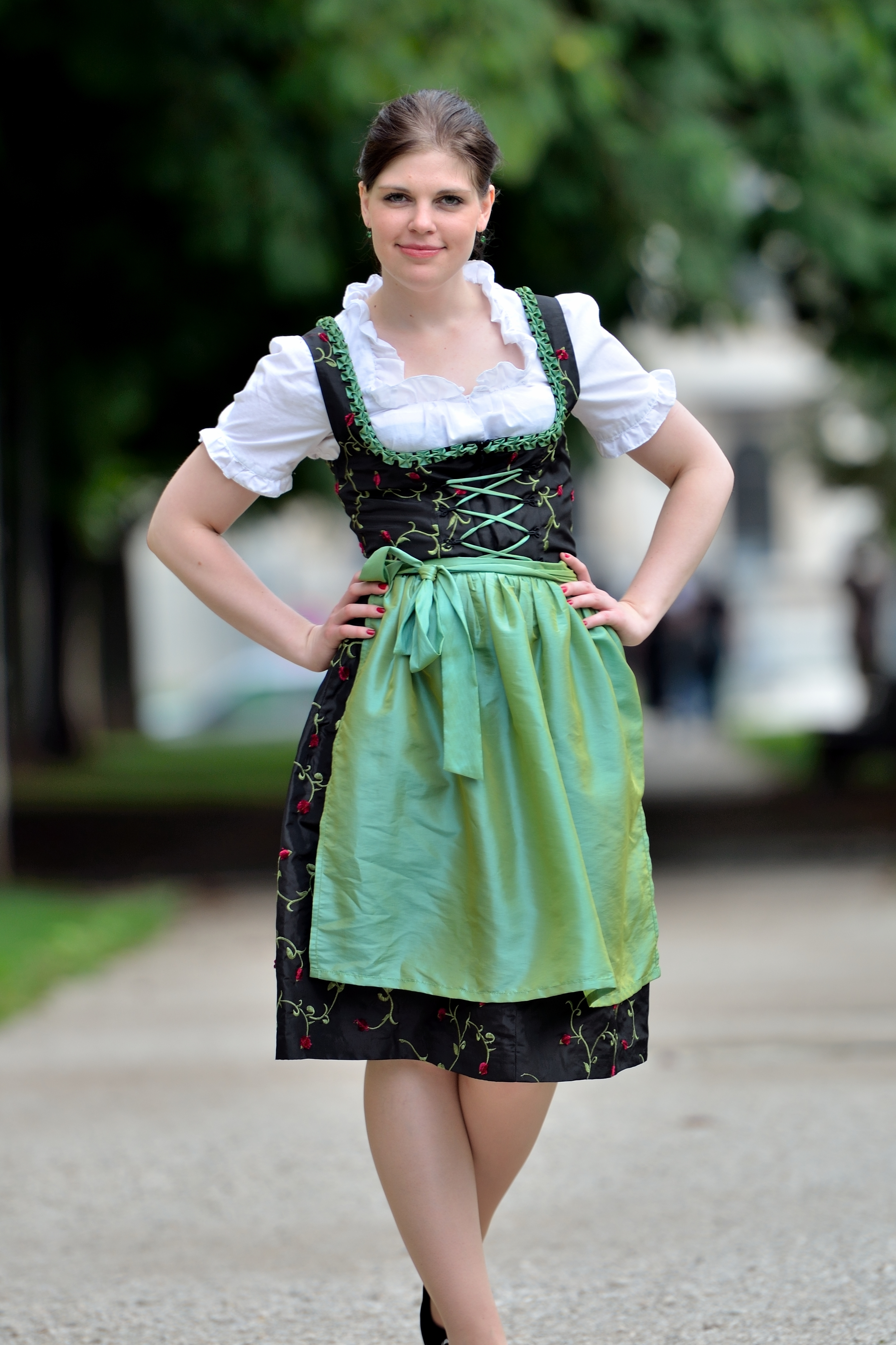
A woman wearing a dirndl

In the 19th century, in parts of Europe, styles reflected local folk dress, so that the bodice in France was frilled, in Austria took the form of the dirndl, and in Bulgaria, it had a gold stomacher. Other styles seen in the 19th century include:

- the casaquin bodice,
- the coat-bodice inspired by men's frock coats,
- the long cuirasse bodice, which was also called the Joan of Arc bodice,
- the pointed Marie Stuart bodice,
- the modest Circassian bodice,
- the amazon corsage,
- the bag bodice, which was popular in Canada,
- the Agnes Sorel bodice, which had a high, square-cut neckline and was worn with bishop sleeves,
- the casaque bodice,
- the antique bodice, which, despite its name, was the new fashion in its time,
- the pleated Grecian-style Norma corsage,
- the Anglo–Greek bodice with wide lapels,
- the bébé bodice with its sash,
- the Empire bodice with its scarves,
- the beribboned bohemian-style baby bodice,
- the Elizabethan bodice, which reflected the styles popular in the Elizabethan era, but which was worn during the late Victorian era.

== Today ==
Bodices survive into modern times in the traditional or revived folk dress of many European countries, as in the case of the German/Austrian dirndl and Scottish highland dancers' Aboyne dress. They are also commonly seen today at gatherings celebrating archaic European customs, such as Oktoberfest, Society for Creative Anachronism events, and Renaissance Fairs. Some Asian cultures also feature bodices, including the Indian choli, Chinese dudou, Vietnamese yếm and Indonesian kemben.

== See also ==
- Angia
- Bodice ripper
