= Casaquin =

A casaquin is a short-length closely fitted coat worn by middle- and upper-class women during the 18th century. The garment was popular in both France and Italy. A casaquin was made from linen which was then covered by embroidery, silk and lace to decorate. The design was influenced by religious beliefs or events as well as reflecting on stylistic features of the time or of individual designers. Casaquins were worn both by working-class women (for practical purposes) and upper-class ladies (for social or ceremonious occasions). The casaquin even influenced women from the Netherlands during the 18th century to introduce their own version of a casaquin called a "Kassekijntje".

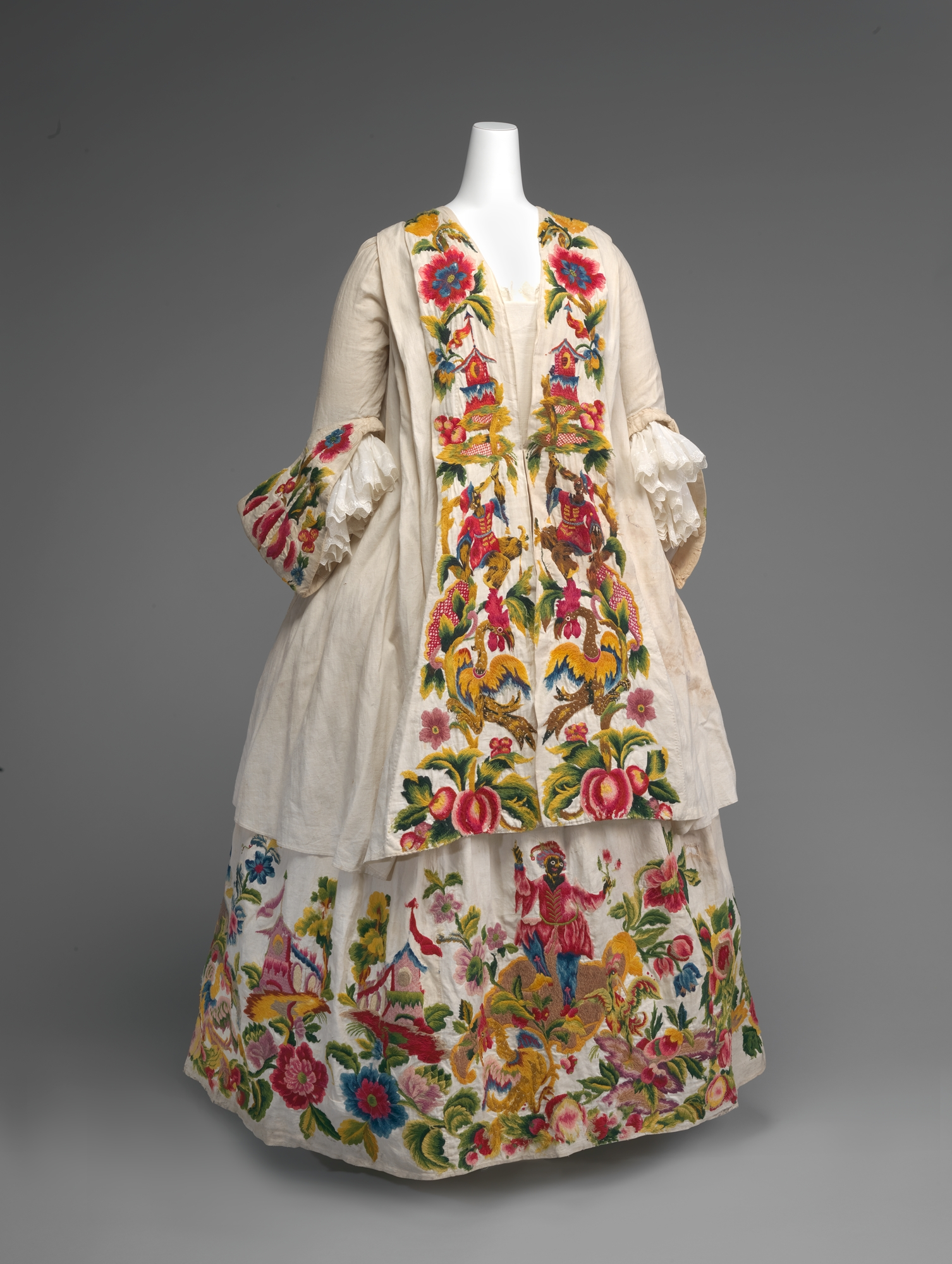
This casaquin (1725–1740, Italian) jacket from the MET Museum features woollen embroidery of birds, pagodas, and exotic flowers. The flowers reflect on the chinoiseries style commonly used by designers throughout the 18th century. The figures stitched which appear as Jesters can be described as Grotesque. This is another style—also used commonly throughout the 18th century—in which figures were represented through distorted shapes creating a mysterious or even unpleasant image. This design represents the influence of the 17th-century designer Jean Berain. The postures of the figures depicted are also identified as a symbol commonly used throughout the 18th century to represent the four continents.

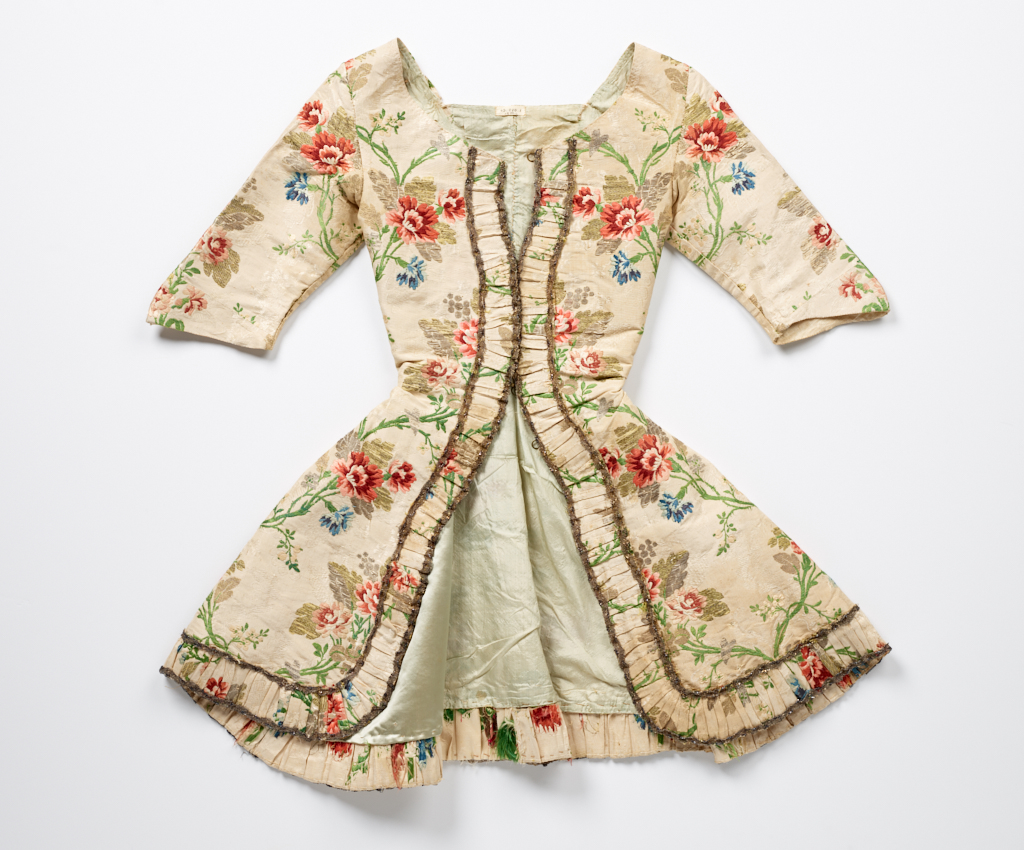
This casaquin (1700s, French) from the RISD Museum highlights an alternative use of casaquins. Its small size indicates it was not worn by a woman but rather used to decorate a religious sculpture. The material consists of silk woven with metallic thread and a floral pattern. The closure and bottom of the garment are accessorised with metallic bobbin lace.

== Construction ==
A casaquin was constructed from a petticoat bodice made from linen decorated with silk, lace and embroidery. A casaquin was created and designed by a couturiere meaning a female designer of high fashion customised garments for a private client. A casaquin had the design and fit of a dress however was much shorter in length, finishing at the hip, to be worn as a sort of jacket. Often the casaquin was complete with pleats and a flared skirt around the back of the coat. Colourful woolen embroidery was stitched across the casaquin to decorate the linen. From examination of various sources and as represented in the images beside, the embroidery and decoration varied greatly across casaquin's. Embroidery sometimes featured depictions of fruits, animals, flowers, dancing figures or pagodas. Designs were influenced by significant events, beliefs or stylistic features popular during the time. Some of the popular styles used for embroidery during this period included chinoiseries, grotesque and allegorical imagery. The design may also reflect the specific style of the designer. Coloured silk was also used as well as metallic lace in silver or gold to embellish the casaquin.

=== Linen in the 1700s ===
Linen was originally created during the early 1600s entirely through manual labour. The process involved harvesting the flax crops and then submerging the stems in water until they rotted. The stems would then be crushed until the individual fibres separated which could be spun into thread and then woven into a cloth. Next the cloth would be cleaned and beaten with a wooden hammer to increase its strength. This would also give the material a shine. Throughout the 18th century some of these processes became mechanised utilising water power. This entailed using wooden blade powered by a water mill to separate the flax into fibres. Another step that was mechanised by water power was the hammer for beating the cloth. The cloth was washed using a sequence of water powered wheels which pulled it through wooden "scrubbing boards" made from a sheet of wood with grooves or "corrugated wood".

The linen industry was increasingly growing in the 1700s. In order to keep up with its popular demand, which the French weavers were not sufficient for, the industry spread to Ireland. A linen producing town known as Cootehill was formed, which became "a major centre for Linen trade", the linen produced here was some of the finest in the world. Linen was produced by weavers, flax spinners and bleachers within the town.

=== Silk in the 1700s ===
By the eighteenth century, silk was a prominent industry with over 100 silk mills located in Italy. The raw materials for silk production were sourced internationally, predominantly from China, the West Indies, North American and Africa. Silk mills were powered by water during this time, the largest located in Derby England which was operated by a crew of 300 utilising the River Derwent. It was built by Thomas Lombe.

The invention of the automated loom or Jacquard Loom during the 18th century, allowed for more intricate and varied patterns to be weaved with silk. The first automated loom was invented by Jacques de Vaucanson in 1741.

Silk was also commonly used during this period for household furniture including sheets, quilts or rugs.

=== Lace in the 1700s ===
Lace was still a smaller industry with the majority of its production taking place within the homes of low-income agricultural families. It was produced by women and children using delicate threads which were twisted to create patterns and designs. Finer pieces of lace were crafted using metallic fabric in gold or silver using as many as 400 bobbins.

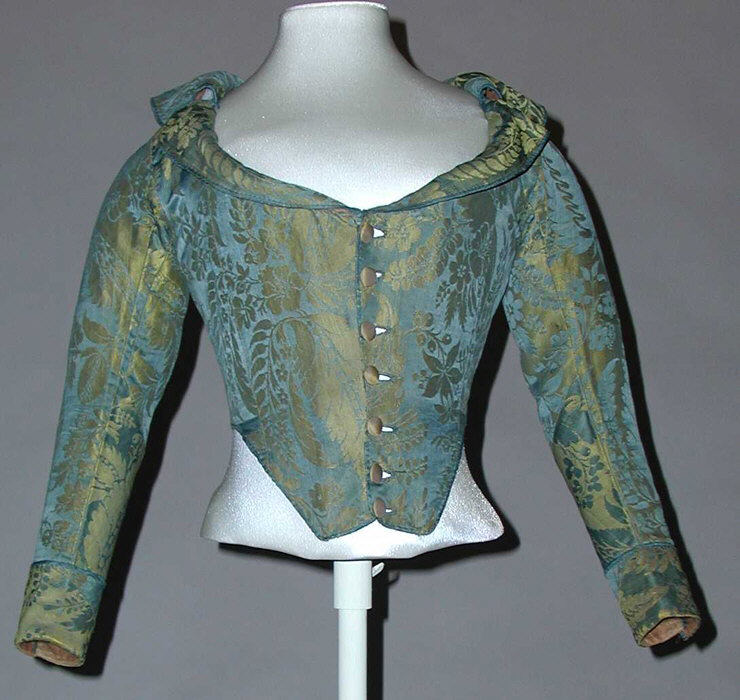
This is another casaquin (1785, Italian) in the Met Museum collection. It features silk cuffed sleeves which mimicked the gentleman's sleeves of the time and a fitted back.

== Wear ==
Women of the 18th century typically wore one of three styles of dresses. The first was an open robe, which was a gown with a joint bodice and skirt which was open at the front. The second was a closed robe, which also featured a joint bodice and skirt but was not open at the front. These gowns were then covered by a "wrapping gown" which also had varied styles. These included a Mantua or a loose fitting gown, a sack-back gown, which had box style pleats around the back or a Polonaise which was an overskirt with draped and ruffled material. The final style of dress was a detached skirt and bodice. The bodice worn with the detached skirt also had alternative styles. One of these was a casaquin. The other styles included a Petenlair which was looser and longer than a casaquin or a riding style jacket which was usually paired with a riding skirt and waistcoat.

The casaquin was originally worn by working class women, but during the 1720s it was also adopted by the upper class and considered a fashionable garment. The casaquin was regarded as a variation of the popular fashionable gown, robe à la française which was an informal gown worn by almost all social classes during the 18th Century apart from the extremely poor. During this time comfort and simplicity were increasingly growing as more desirable features of clothing, this was due to the Court of Louis XIV allowing for the introduction of more nonchalant and less confined styles of clothing categorised as "negligee style".

The casaquin was also worn to accentuate the features of the ideal body type that was coveted during this time period, this involved having a waist so small it was comparable to the handspan of a male.

Casaquins in artwork show the wearer ranging from a lower-class kitchen maid to an upper-class lady dressed in formal wear. The design of the casaquin was often an indicator of the purpose of its wear. Some casaquins included elaborate or extensive decoration meaning they were worn by more upper-class women to semi formal social events. These could include meals, ceremonies, walks in noble or higher-class company or Masquerades. Others were a much simpler design worn by middle-class women for every day wear or practical purposes for warmth. Smaller scale casaquins were also created to decorate religious sculptures.

However using the design of a casaquin to indicate the wearer's social status can be ambiguous particularly during the 18th century. During this period remaining fashionable in society's eyes was of utmost importance to many females as it defined their "social identification". Despite an individual's class or rank they could still be considered respectable if they were well dressed. It grew to the extent that some called for a way to identify social classes as some women would sacrifice the well-being of herself and family for clothes, Bernard Mandeville stating in the 18th century "The poorest Labourer's Wife in the Parish, who scorns to wear a strong wholesome Frize, as she might, will half starve herself and her Husband to purchase a second-hand Gown and Petticoat, ... because, forsooth, it is more genteel". This quote using the example of a low-class female who would use money for her family's food instead to buy a second-hand luxury dress. This desire to be fashionable allowed for the growth of the second-hand clothing industry during the 18th century. Fine clothes could be resold and then bought by lower classes. The mechanisation of the textile industry as well as the increased trade during the later 18th century also meant varied designs of fabric were highly available, with finer and intricate patterns growing less rare. This blurred another boundary between the social classes in terms of fashion.

== Historical significance ==
Some casaquins were designed and worn by well known figures in history. An example includes the casaquin from the French museum Palais Galliera which was found in the noble house of Ligne. This particular casaquin dates from 1730–1740 and was made from a blue linen interior. The exterior is decorated with coral silk and silver lace. It is proposed that this casaquin was owned and worn by Elisabeth Alexandrine de Salm who was the mother of the 7th Prince of Ligne, Charles-Joseph de Ligne.

The Hindeloopen women from the Netherlands were inspired by the French casaquin after its popularity in the 18th century and adopted a similar style of decorated short jackets known as a "Kassekijntje". The kassekijntje was made from a material originating in India called Chintz. Chintz was made from woven fabric which was then hand painted with colourful and exotic patterns. Similarly to the casaquin many of the designs were originally typical of indoor decor like furniture or wall hangings but became popularised for clothing within the 18th century.
