= Pelisse =

Type of fur jacket

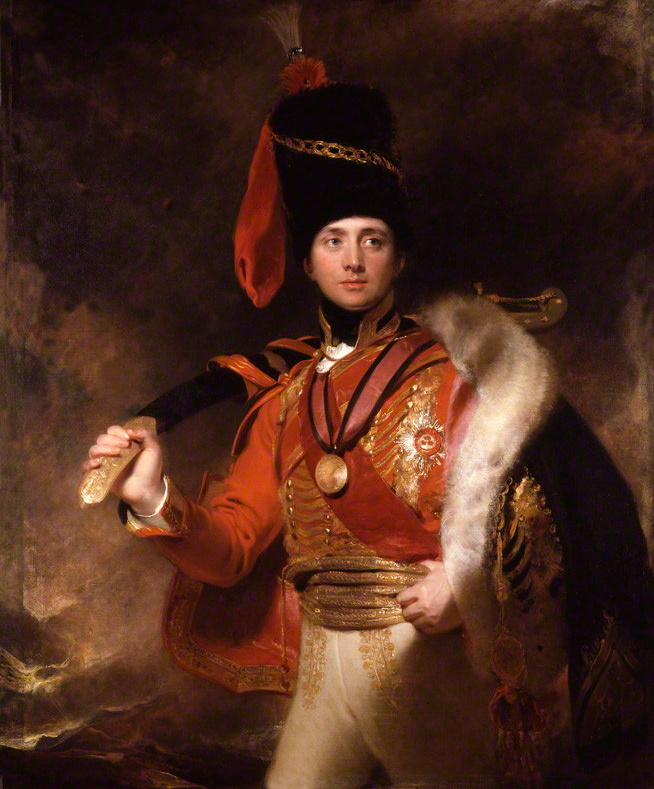
1812 portrait of Charles Stewart wearing a pelisse slung over the shoulder

A pelisse was originally a short fur-trimmed jacket which hussar light-cavalry soldiers from the 17th century onwards usually wore hanging loose over the left shoulder, ostensibly to prevent sword cuts. The name also came to refer to a fashionable style of woman's coat-like garment worn in the early-19th century.

== Military uniform ==
The style of uniform incorporating the pelisse originated with the hussar mercenaries of Hungary in the 17th century. As this type of light cavalry unit became popular in Western Europe, so too did their dress. In the 19th century pelisses were in use throughout most armies in Europe, and even some in North and South America.

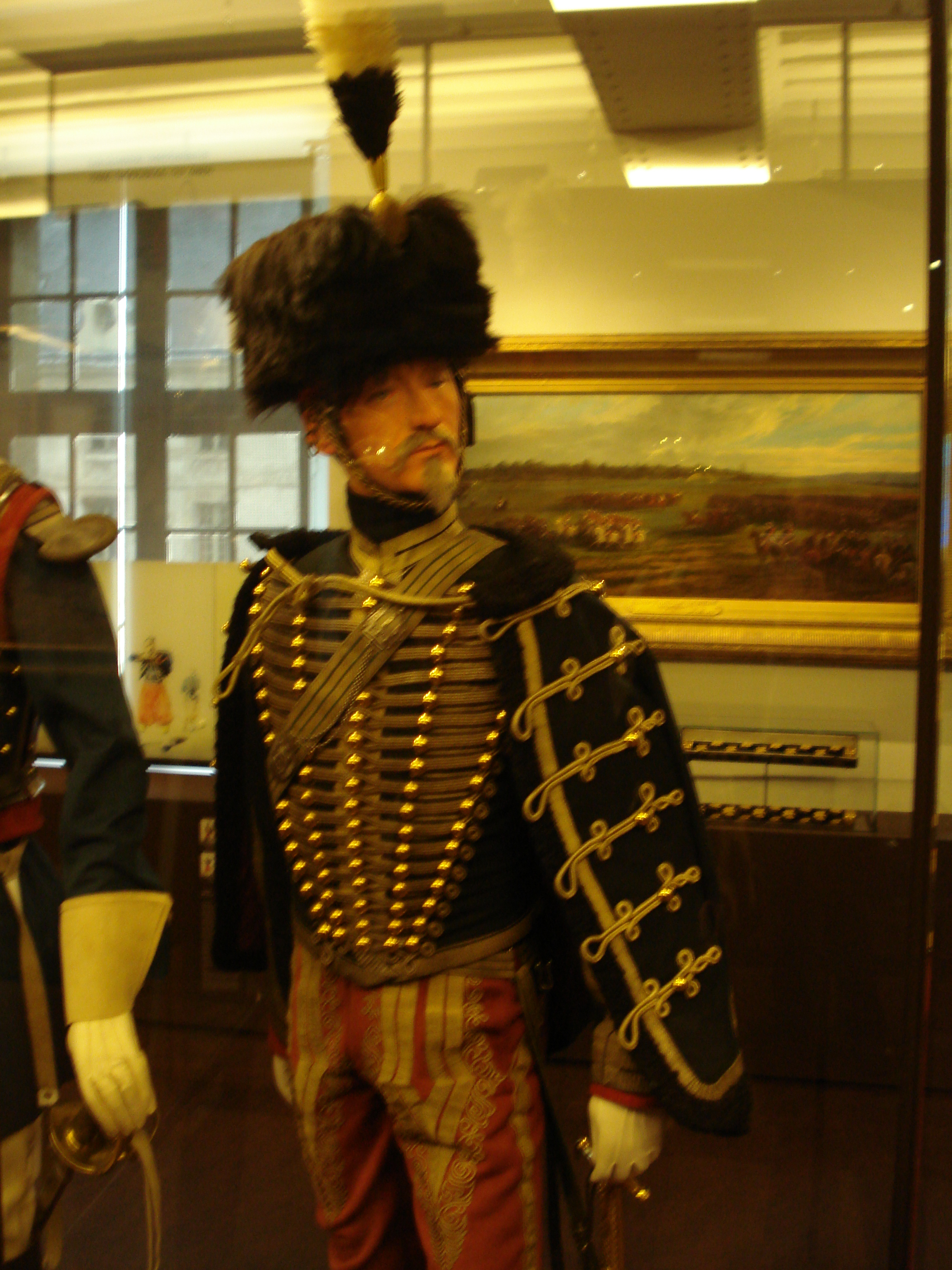
Uniform of French Second Empire Hussar with the characteristic loose-hanging pelisse over-jacket

In appearance the pelisse was characteristically a very short and extremely tight fitting (when worn) jacket, the cuffs and collar of which were trimmed with fur. The jacket was further decorated with patterns sewn in bullion lace, often in a pattern matching that of the dolman worn beneath it. The front of the jacket was distinctive and typically featured several rows of parallel froggings and loops, and either three or five vertical lines of buttons. For officers of the British Hussars this frogging, regimentally differentiated, was generally of gold or silver bullion lace, to match either gold (gilt) or silver buttons. Other ranks had either yellow lace with brass buttons or white lace with "white-metal" (nickel) buttons. Lacing varied from unit to unit and country to country. It was held in place by a lanyard. In cold weather the pelisse could be worn over the dolman.

The prevalence of this style began to wane towards the end of the 19th century, but it was still in use by some cavalry regiments in the Imperial German, Russian and Austro-Hungarian armies up until World War I. In the Prussian Army the pelisse had been abolished in 1853 but between 1865 and 1913 it was reintroduced for ceremonial wear by nine hussar regiments and the Life-Guard Hussar Regiment, usually at the request of the regimental Colonel-in-Chief. The two hussar regiments of the Spanish Army retained pelisses until 1931. The Danish Garderhusarregimentet are the only modern military unit to retain this distinctive item of dress, as part of their mounted full-dress uniform.

== Ladies fashion ==
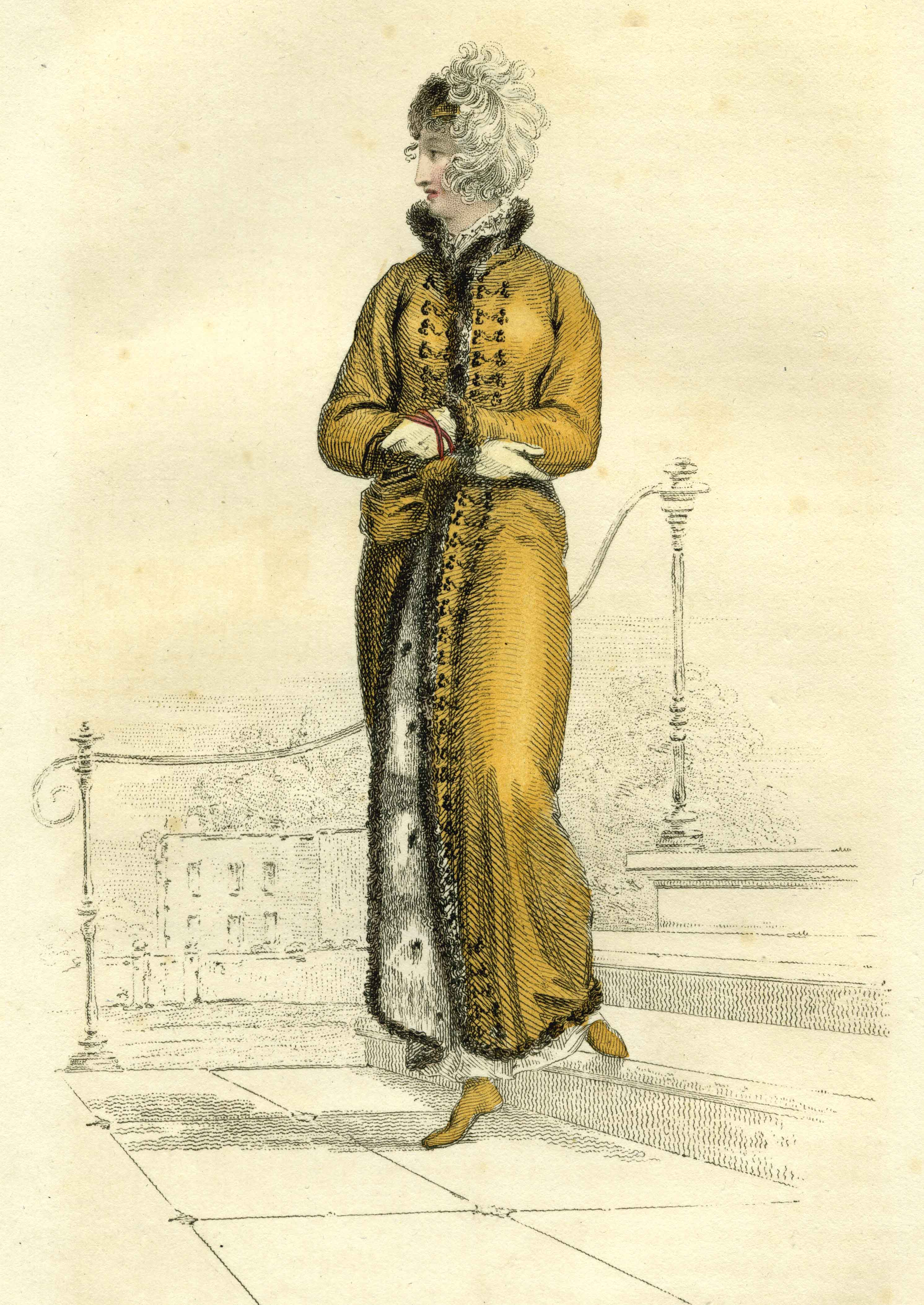
Woman's fur-lined pelisse from Ackermann's Repository, Nov.1811

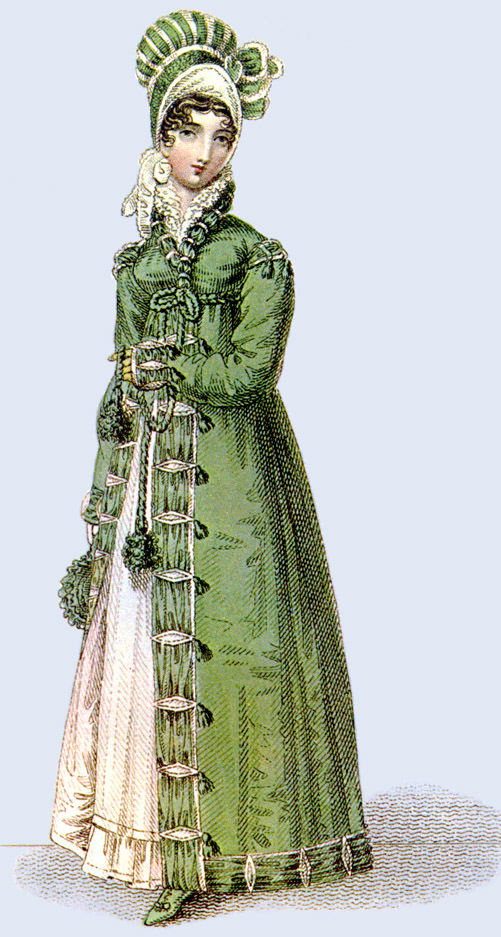
Green silk pelisse from La Belle Assemblée, Apr.1817

Through the 18th and 19th centuries, the term pelisse was used in western women's fashionable dress to refer to both an outer coat-like garment (pelisse, pellicle, pelisse-mantle, pelisson, curricle pelisse), and also a dress (pelisse robe) worn as daywear.

Pelisse of the 18th century resembled a hooded cloak, whereas those of the early 19th century, as both a coat-like garment and a dress, were more fitted to the body, reflecting the Empire line of the period. Pelisse could be made from any number of different fabrics, from lightweight cotton muslins to heavier woollens.

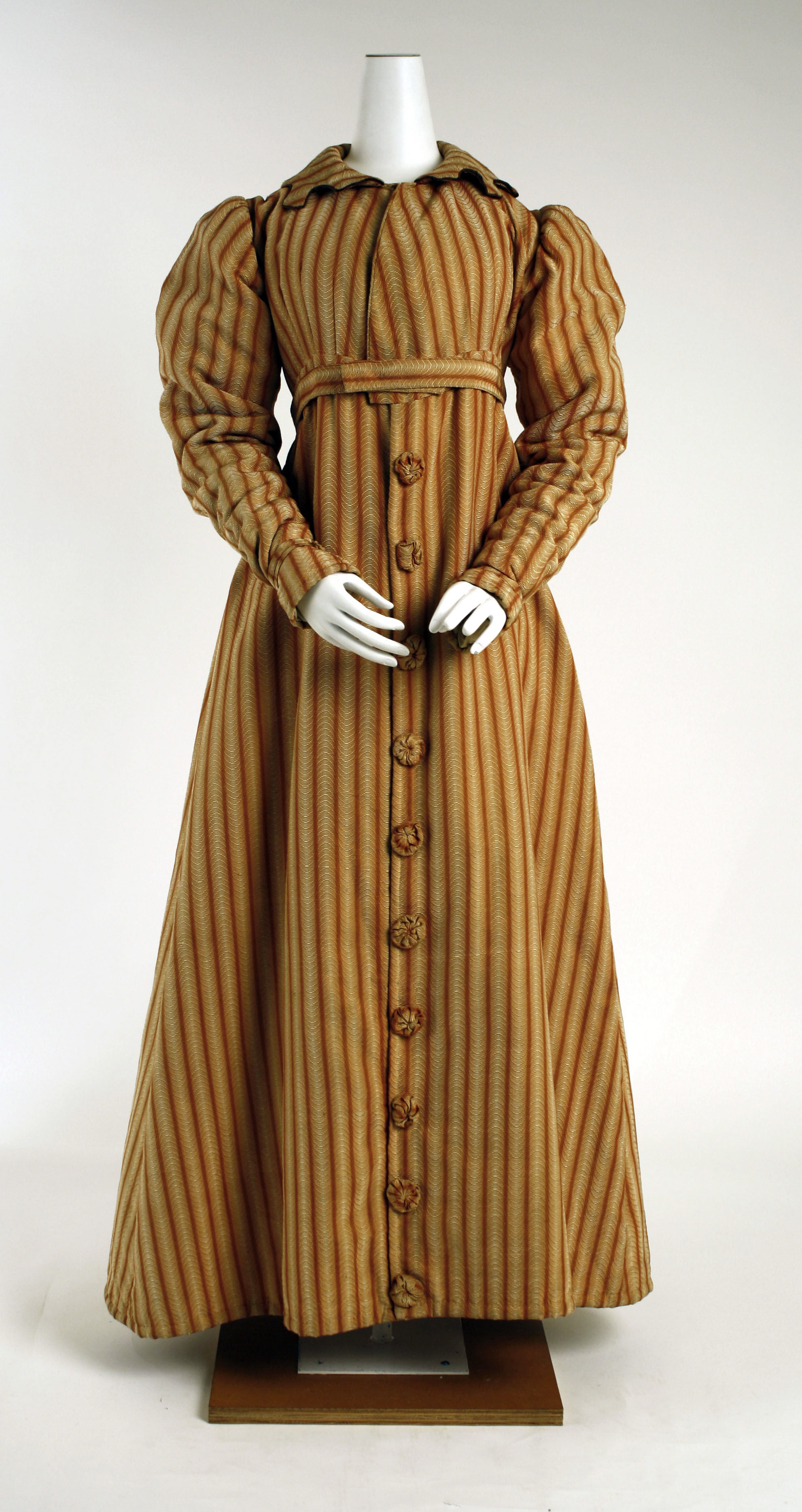
Pelisse, silk, c. early 1820s. The Metropolitan Museum of Art Costume Institute: C.I.52.36.

In early 19th-century Europe, when military clothing was often used as inspiration for fashionable ladies' garments, the Regency-era initially imitated the Hussars' fur and braid. Though pelisse soon lost these initial associations, being made entirely of fabrics such as silk, the womenswear garment did, however, tend to retain traces of their military inspiration with frog fastenings and braid trim. Many pelisse had small capes, the curricle pelisse of the 1820s being particularly notable, as it featured three.

The pelisse robe, a day dress with similar styling to coat-like pelisse, had similar features to the pelisse, such as front fastenings, and was often intricately decorated with such applications as ribbons and embroidery. In the 1840s, the pelisse robe became more commonly referred to as a redingote.

Depending on the season and use of the pelisse, the garment could be made of cotton, silk, taffeta, or wool, and trimmed - usually on the collar, center front edges, cuffs, and hem – with fur, swansdown, lace, velvet, fringe, or silk plush.

Pelisse finally lost any resemblance to their origins in men's military dress as skirts and sleeves widened in the 1830s, and the increasingly large crinoline skirts of the 1840s and 1850s caused fashionable women to turn to loose mantles, cloaks, and shawls (especially those of Paisley design) instead. The term pelisse did however continue to be used, with the pelisse-mantle of c.1838-1845, a long cloak with fitted back, and pelisse-robe of c.1817-1850 contributing to the garment's longevity.

== See also ==
- Hussar
- Boskai Coat
- Redingote
- Witzchoura
- Mantle
- Cloak
- Shawl
- Cape
- Paisley shawl
- Jacket
- Dolman
