= Dolman =

Two types of garment

A dolman is either a military shirt, or a jacket decorated with braiding, first worn by Hungarian hussars. The word is of Turkish origin, and after being adopted into Hungarian, has propagated to other languages. The garment was worn by peasants from the 16th century onward and eventually spread throughout the country, mainly within wealthy peasant circles. It reached people living in the poorest conditions only at the end of the 19th century.

== Military dolman ==
The dolman entered Western culture via Hungary starting in the sixteenth and continuing on into the nineteenth centuries where Hungarian hussars developed it into an item of formal military dress uniform. The jacket was cut tight and short, and decorated with passementerie throughout. Under this was worn an embroidered shirt that was cut tightly to the waist and beneath which the shirt flared out into a skirt that sometimes reached nearly to the knee in the csakora-style. A decorated saber or sword hung from a barrel sash around the waist. The elaborate style of dress came to reflect cultural values with regard to romantic military patriotism.

A second garment called a pelisse was frequently worn over it: a similar coat but with fur trimming, most often worn slung over the left shoulder with the sleeves (if any) hanging loose.

== Fashionable dolman ==
In the 19th century, Western women's fashion, a dolman was a garment which was worn outdoors as a type of jacket-style covering. The dolman was a popular style of mantle worn by fashionable women in the 1870s and 1880s.

The unique construction of the dolman—cut in one piece with sleeves giving the effect of a wide cape-like structure—featured elements of a jacket suited to the new styles of garment worn beneath. Its shaping to the front (with elaborate draped sections) and back cut to emphasise the new bustle style of skirt, along with the construction of the dolman's bodice and shoulders, cemented its place as a fashionable garment.

Dolman were often made from silk velvet, fur, or wool for winter wear, and decorated with passementerie trimmings such as ribbons, fringing, beading, and tassels. Many surviving examples of dolman were made-up from Paisley shawls which had fallen out of fashion in their original form due to the shaping of the bustle skirt—the dolmans seen as better suited.

The dolmanette, of the 1890s was crocheted.

A dolman sleeve is a sleeve set into a very low armscye; in fact, the armscye may extend to the waistline, in which case there will be no underarm seam in the blouse. Dolman sleeves were very popular in ladies clothing during the US Civil War. They made the shoulders look sloped, therefore minimizing the appearance of the waist. The early 21st century dolman sleeve describes a sleeve cut as one with the bodice, which can taper to the wrist or be cut widely, a style popularised from the 1930s, and remaining in fashion as the batwing sleeve.

== Gallery ==
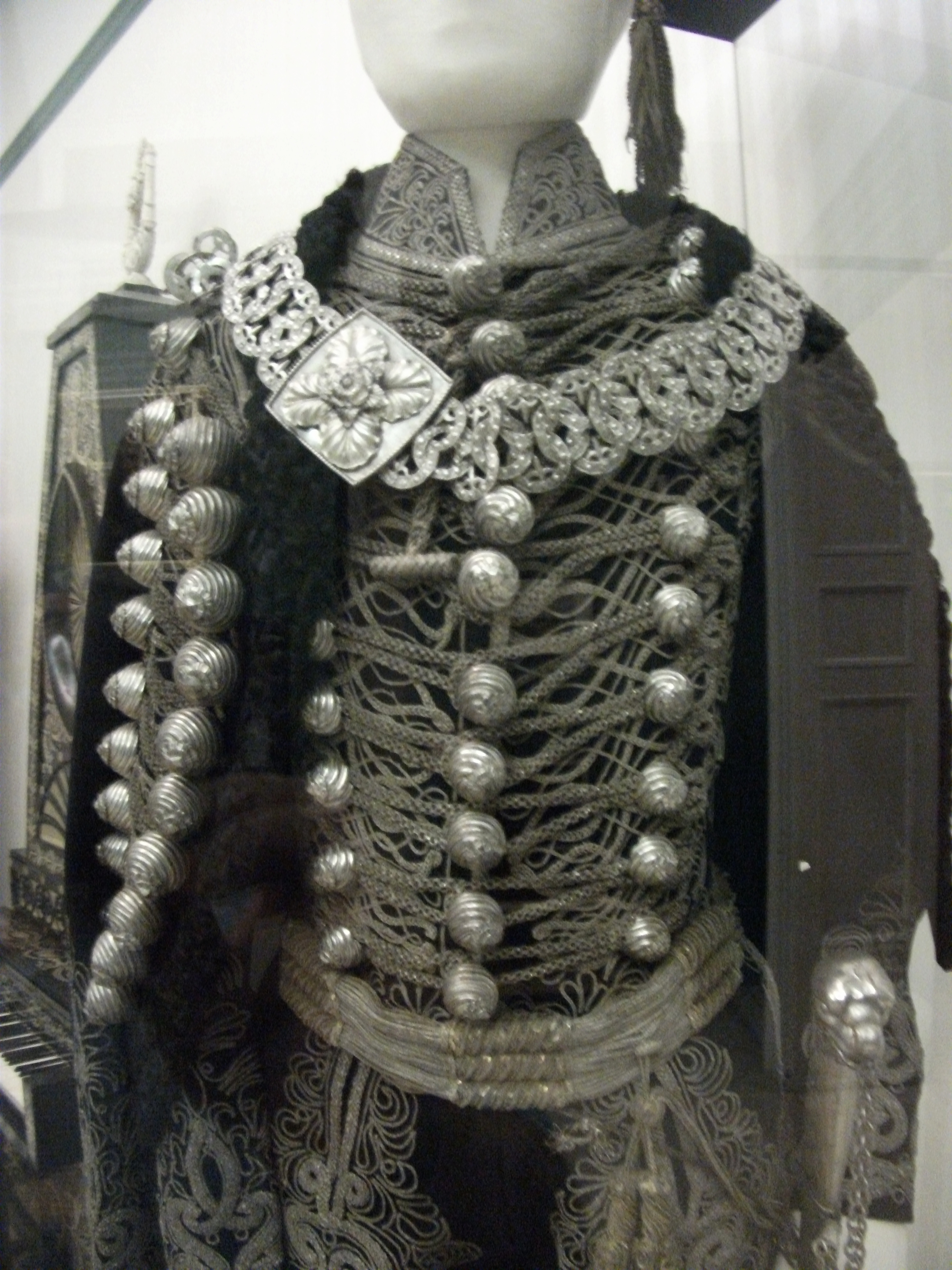
19th century Hungarian dolman for court wear

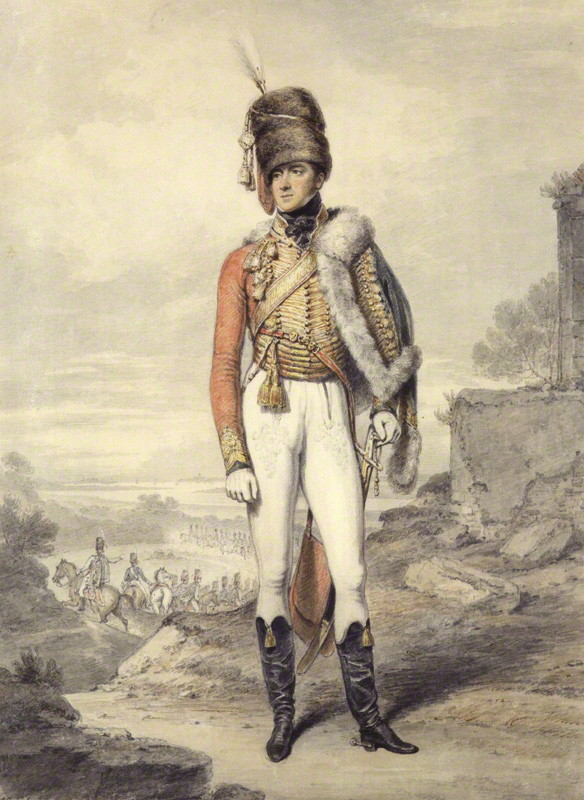
British hussar officer wearing a dolman, 1809

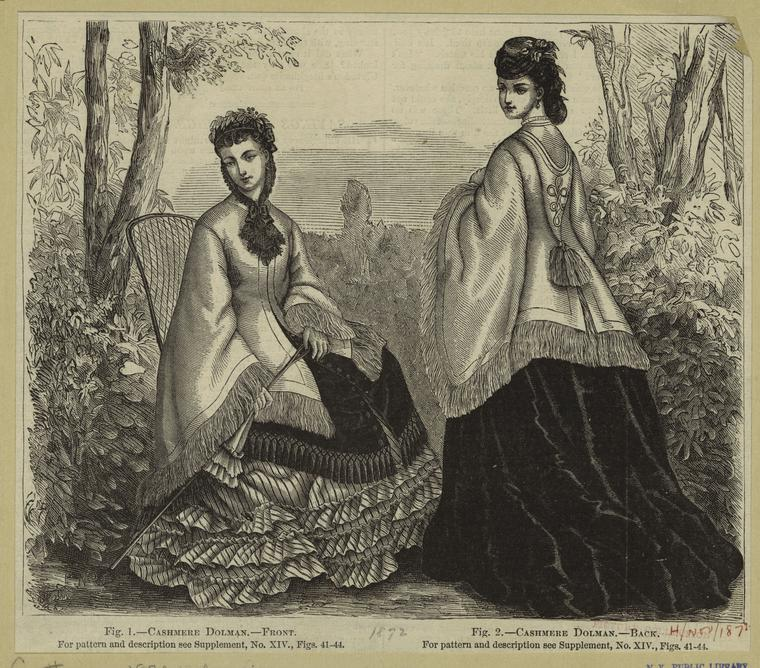
Woman's dolman mantle, front & back views. Harper's Bazaar, November 1871

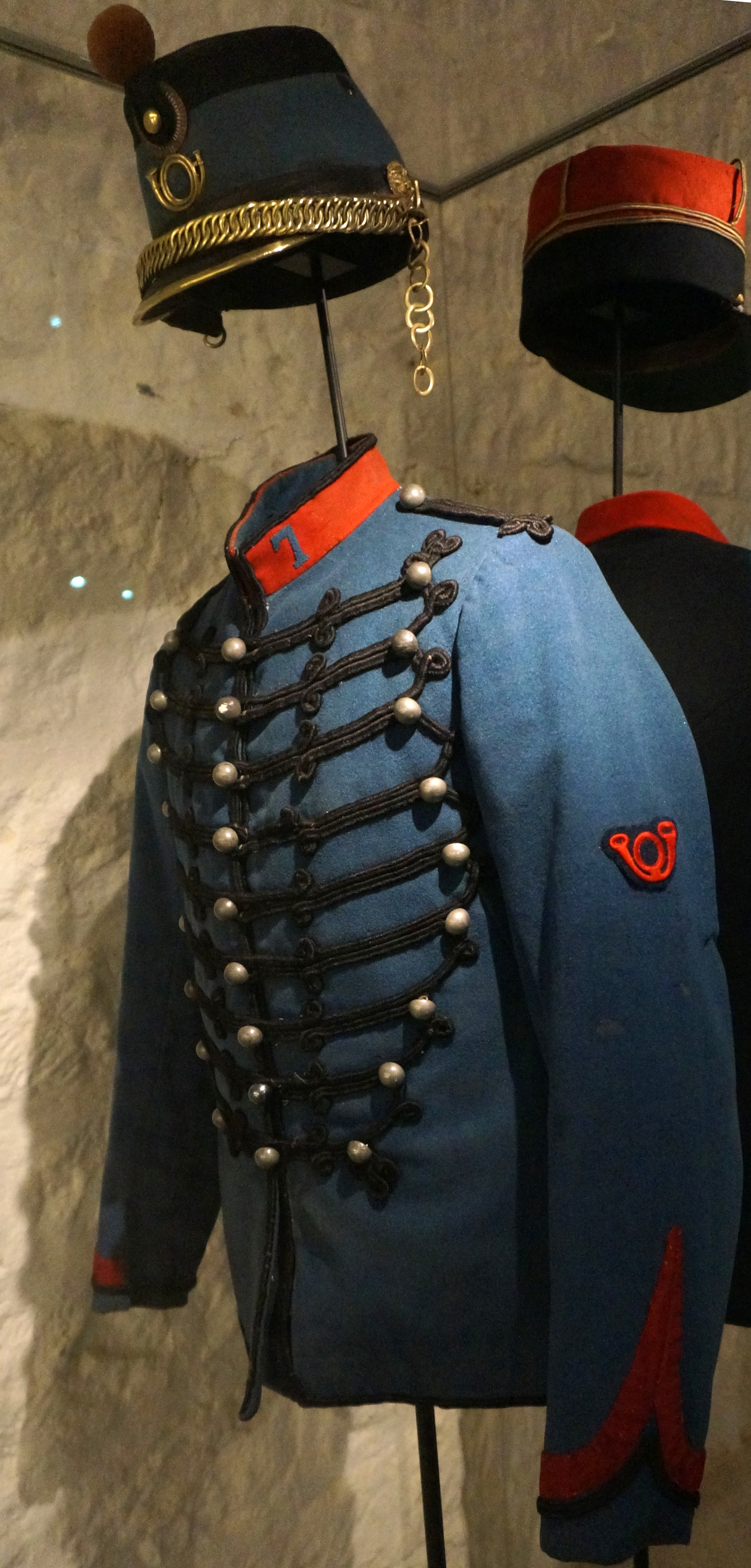
French cavalry dolman, c. 1900

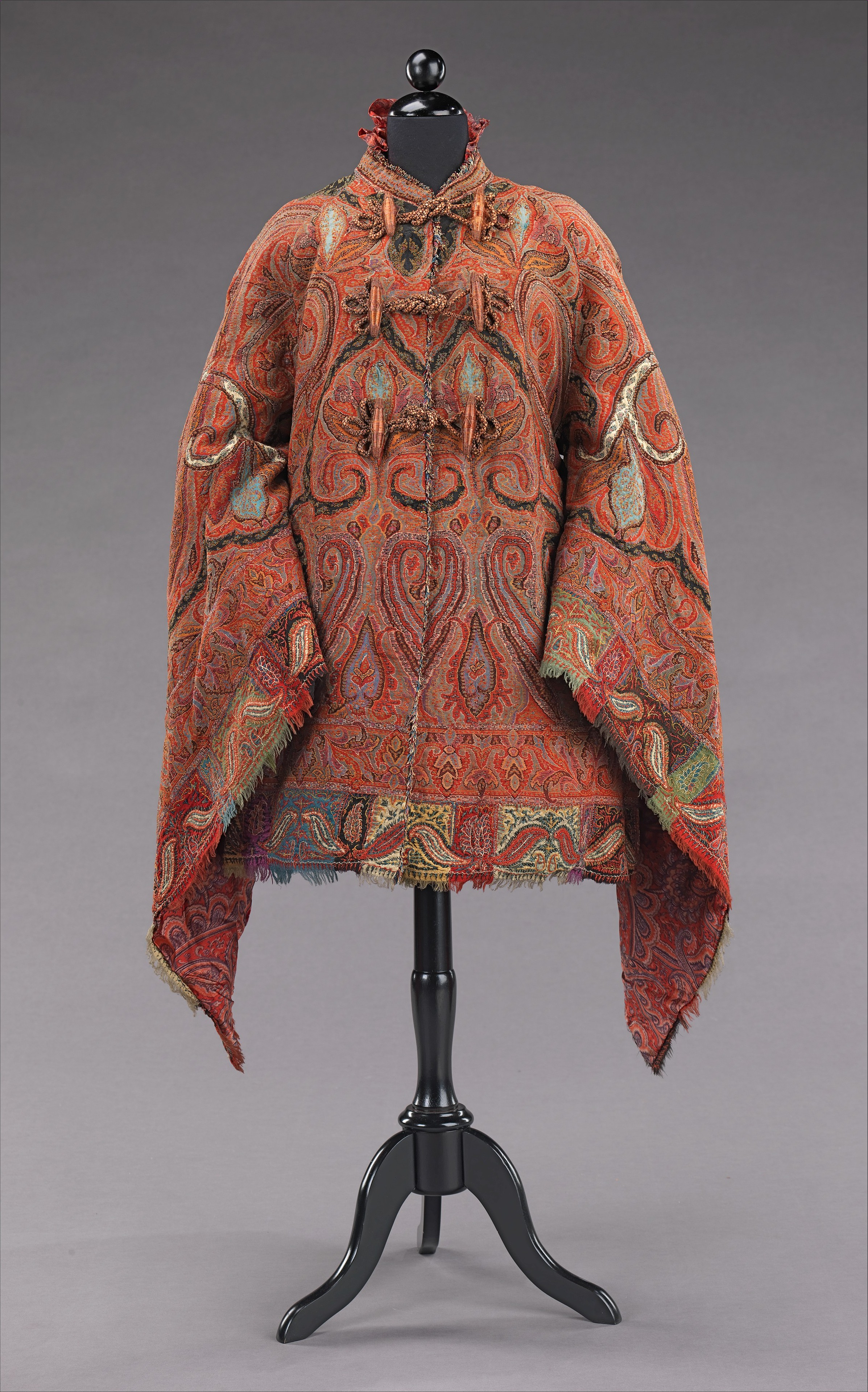
Dolman, wool and silk, presumably made from a recycled Paisley shawl, c.1875. The Metropolitan Museum of Art

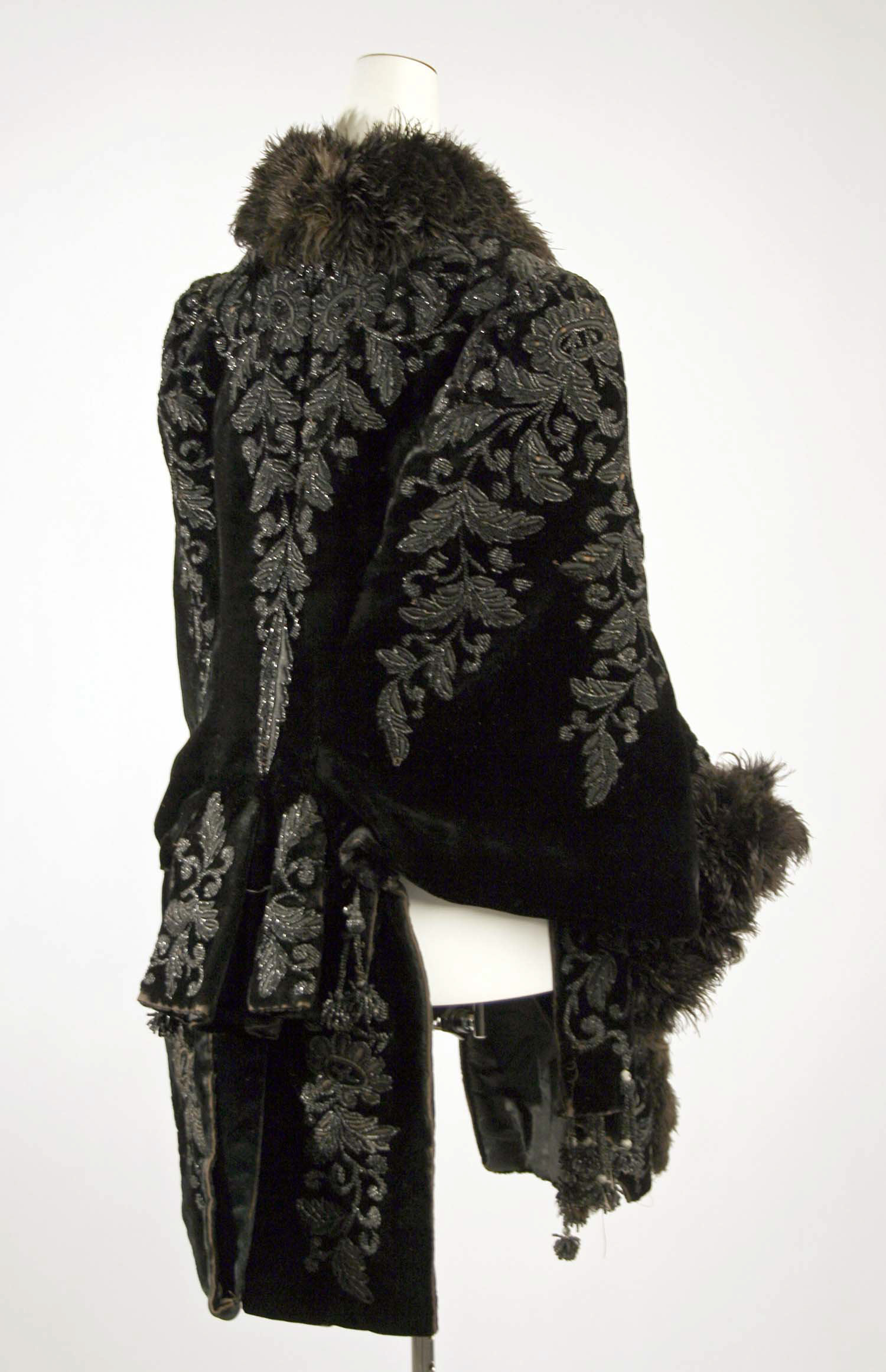
Dolman, silk velvet, c.1880s. Metropolitan Museum of Art Costume Institute: C.I.39.29.
