= Paisley shawls =

18th–19th-century item of women's clothing in Europe

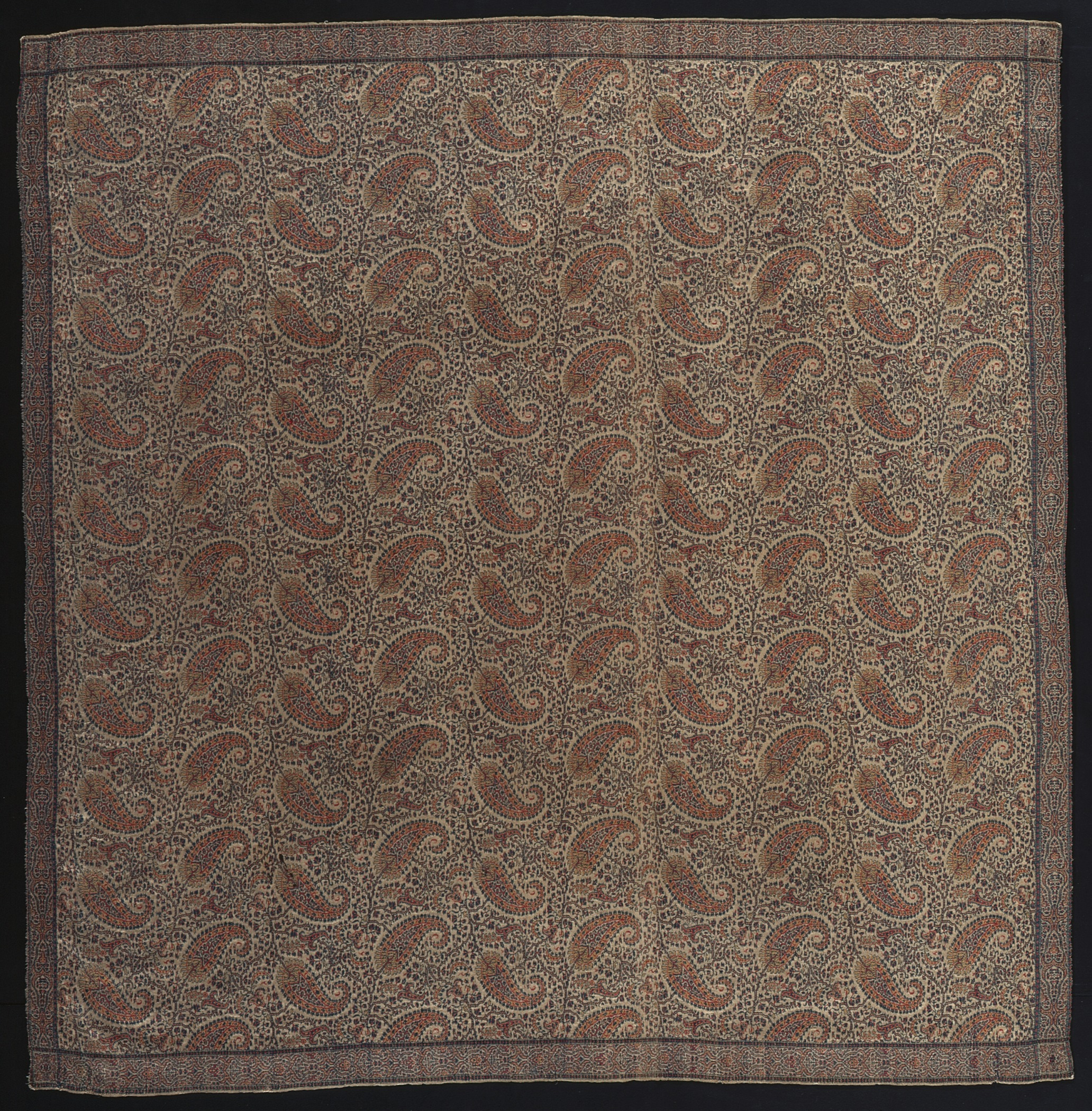
Square Paisley shawl of c. 1830

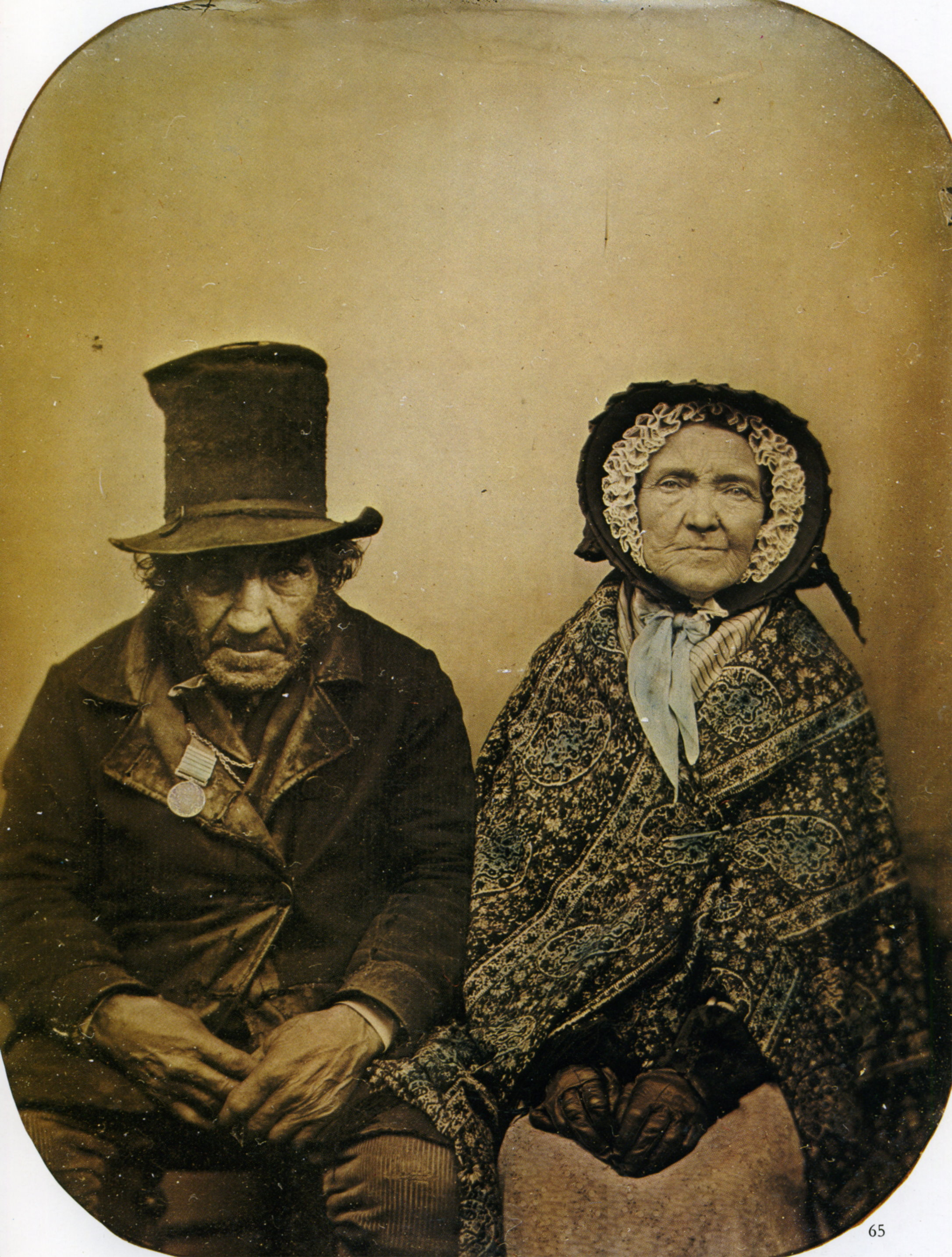
1860s ambrotype of an unnamed British veteran and his wife; the woman is wrapped in a Paisley shawl.

Paisley shawls were a fashionable item of women's clothing in Europe during the late eighteenth and nineteenth centuries. Many were made of intricately woven and delicate wool, as well as examples being printed onto silks, wools, and cotton. These pieces were highly decorative. Although now known as the Paisley pattern, the teardrop motif originated in Persia and India, becoming popular in Europe—and synonymous with Paisley, Renfrewshire, therefore earning name-association with the town—in the nineteenth century.

== History ==
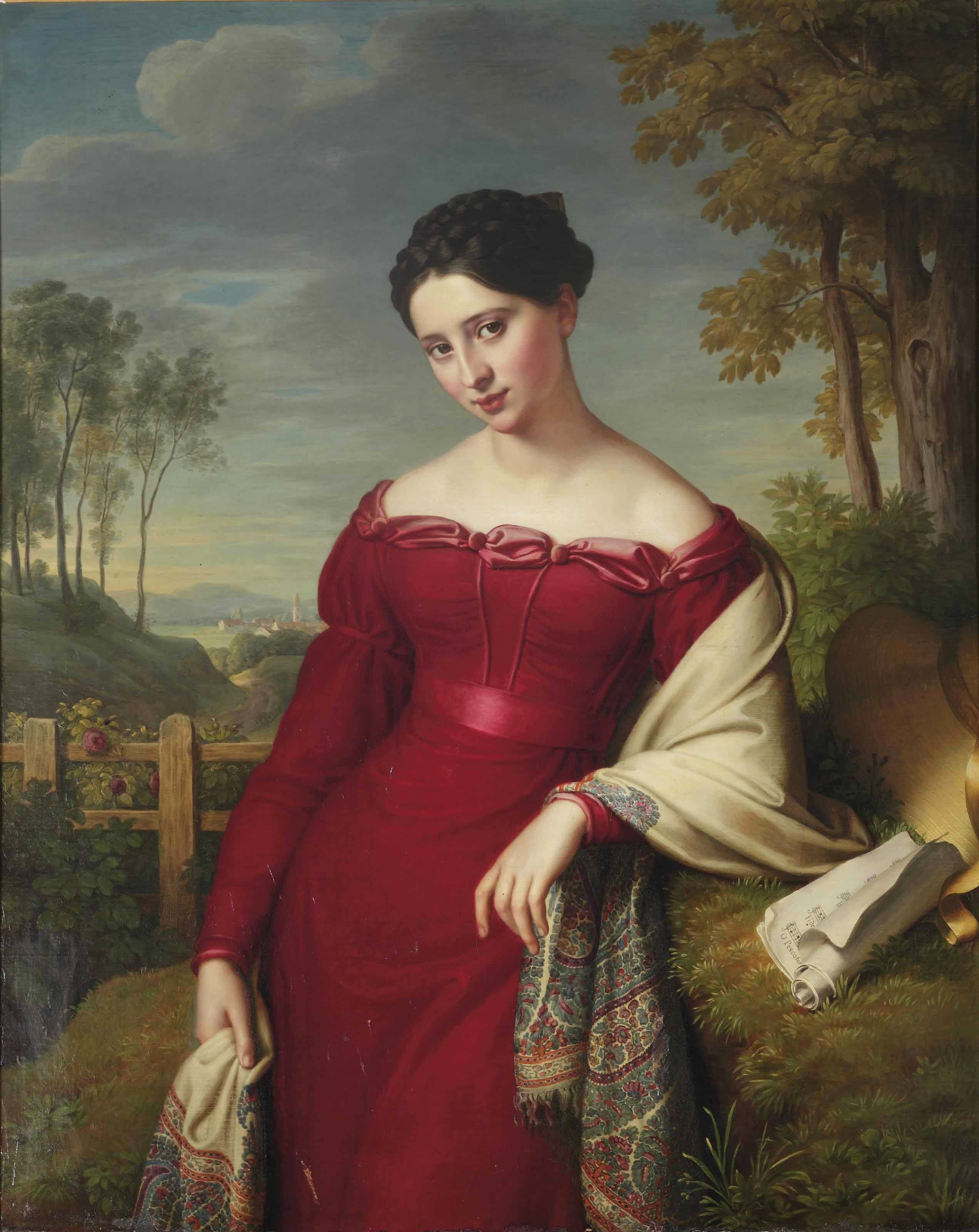
1824 portrait of an elegant lady with an embroidered shawl

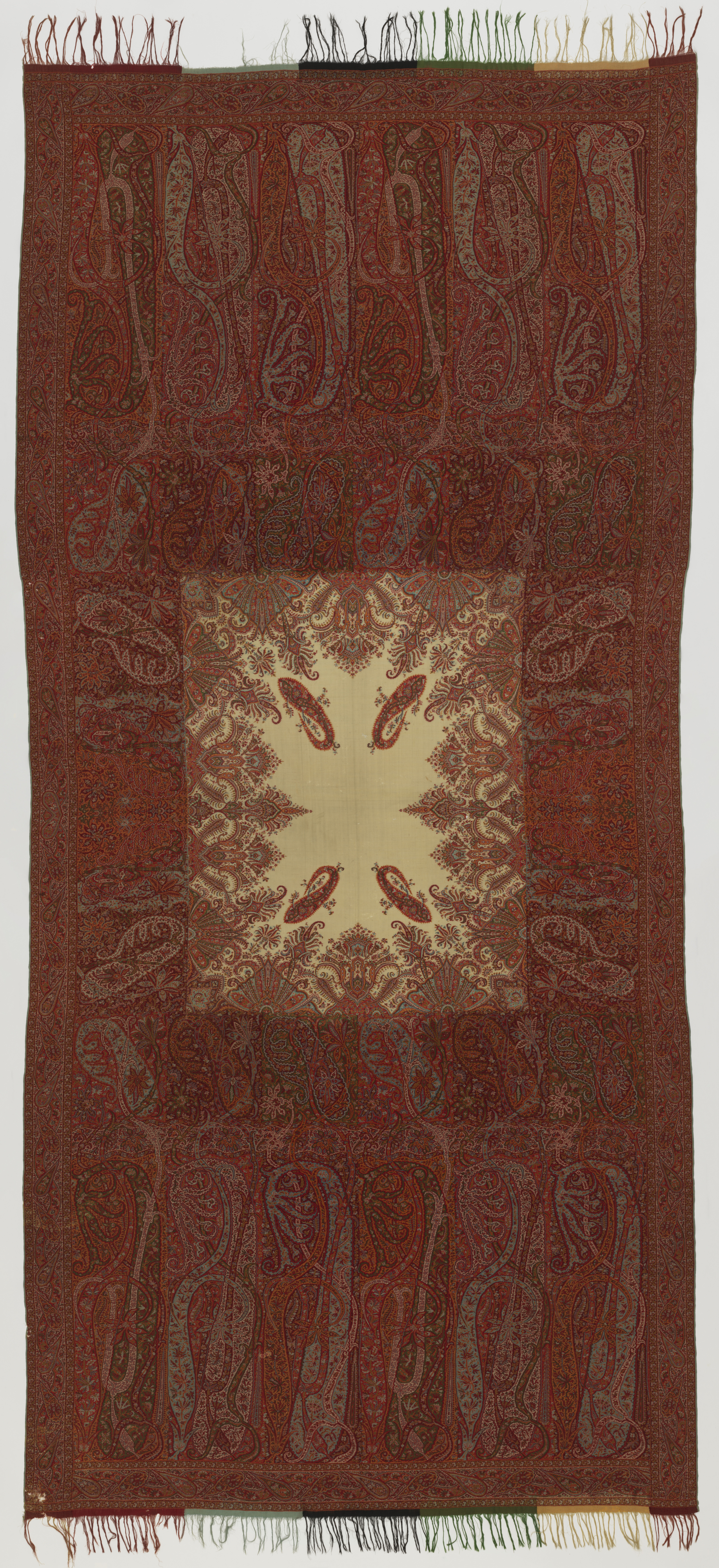
Shawl of 1840–1850

The Paisley shawl has its antecedents in the Kashmir shawl, produced in Kashmir, since the eleventh century, and more intensively in central Asia in the fifteenth and sixteenth centuries. In the eighteenth century, travel, trade, and colonisation, namely by the British East India Company, saw examples of Kashmir shawls brought back to Europe.

Around 1805, the first shawls in imitation of Kashmir originals were produced in Paisley, Scotland, following manufacture in Lyon, Edinburgh, and Norwich in the latter decades of the eighteenth century. This began a 70-year period during which the town of Paisley, which had long been an important weaving and textile working town, became the most important centre of production for these kinds of shawls in Europe. By 1850, there were over 7,000 weavers working in the town.

Shawls were also produced in Edinburgh, Glasgow, France, and Norwich, but Paisley's innovations in production methods (particularly, their subdivision of labour), as well as the reduced prices of Paisley-produced shawls, meant that by 1850 Edinburgh halted production, no longer able to compete. Paisley's overtaking of other centres in production of imitation shawls earned the town an association with the product, therefore altering the European name of the shawl and pattern from 'pine pattern' to 'Paisley'.

Following an extreme downturn in the trade in shawls between 1841 and 1843, Queen Victoria purchased 17 Paisley-made shawls, in order to revive the trade in 1842. Similar patronage of declining textile industries had been shown by the Queen with other British products, like the Honiton lace she wore on her wedding dress in 1840.

The popularity of the shawl declined in the 1870s, due in part to a reduction in price and increase in availability, and also a change in women's fashion, transforming crinoline skirts into the bustle. A decorative bustle was meant to be seen and a shawl would cover it. Additionally, a shawl worn with a bustle skirt would no longer drape in the same manner as when worn with a crinoline, therefore deeming it unsuitable. Shawls gave way to differently designed wraps, including mantles, capes, and dolmans. Another reason for their reduced popularity was due to their limited availability: the Franco-Prussian War (1870–1871) prevented the export of fine goat-hair shawls from Kashmir.

== Production methods ==
In 1812, weavers in Paisley were responsible for innovations in the hand-loom process, adding an attachment which increased the number of wool colours from two to five. Up until the 1820s, weaving was a cottage industry, but the introduction of the Jacquard loom in 1820 meant that weaving moved into the manufactory setting, housing six to eight weavers in a loom shop, working alongside one another. Between 1820 and 1850, the shawls would be woven by individual weavers. However, increases in demand meant that changes in production methods became necessary to cater to the expanding market. The increasing commercialisation of production meant that highly skilled weavers worked with managers and subsidiary trades in order to increase output. For example, where the weaver originally created their own designs, now patterns would be supplied to them. This caused a reduction of wages, autonomy, and prestige, altering the social standing of the Paisley weaver as well as their independence as a practitioner.

== The Paisley Museum shawl collection ==
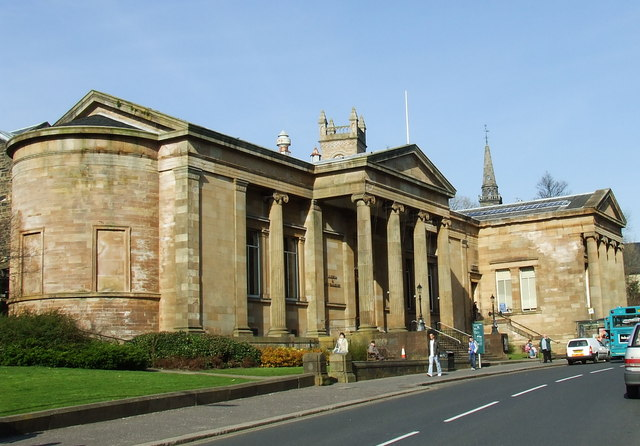
Paisley Museum houses a nationally significant collection of Paisley Shawls.

A collection of Paisley shawls is on display at the Paisley Museum and Art Galleries in Scotland, along with examples of original hand looms. The collection is a Recognised Collection of National Significance to Scotland.

== Sma' Shot Cottages ==
Also located in Paisley town centre are the Sma' Shot Cottages. Owned and run by the Old Paisley Society, a volunteer organisation, the Sma' Shot Cottages are made up of an original Paisley weaver's cottage, dating to the 1750s, and also a mill-worker's cottage, from the early nineteenth century. Both spaces house period objects which show how weavers and mill-workers lived during the eighteenth and nineteenth centuries respectively. The weaver's cottage houses two original hand looms from the period. Within their collections, the Sma' Shot Cottages also hold many examples of surviving Paisley shawls.
