= Polonaise (clothing) =

Style of women's garment

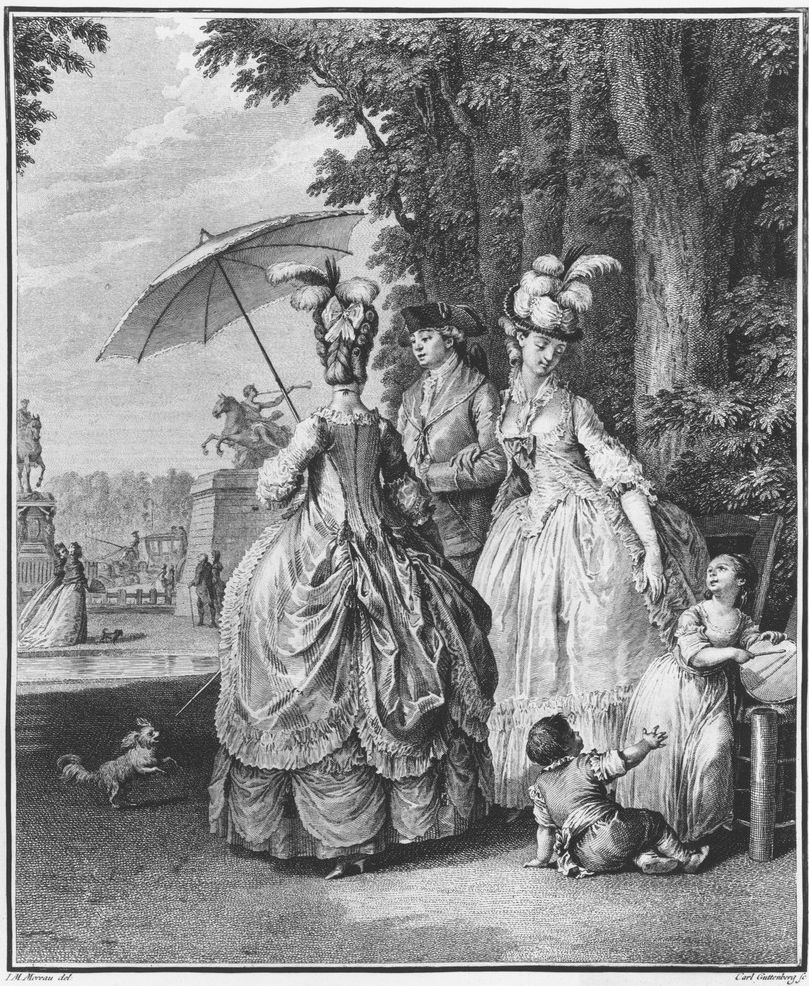
Two women wearing the robe à la polonaise, literally meaning the Polish dress Jean-Michel Moreau, Le Rendez-vous pour Marly, engraved by Carl Guttenberg c. 1777.

The robe à la polonaise or polonaise, literally meaning the Polish dress, is a woman's garment of the 18th century 1770s and 1780s or a similar revival style of the 1870s inspired by Polish national dress style, costume, consisting of a gown with a cutaway, draped and swagged overskirt, worn over an underskirt or petticoat. From the 18th century, the term polonaise also described a fitted overdress which extended into long panels over the underskirt, but was not necessarily draped or swagged.

== Origin and structure ==
As early as the 1720s, French Queen Marie Leszczyńska made the Polish dress popular in that decade. By the 1770s, elements of this style began to appear in fashionable dress, including the wide-brimmed hat (dubbed the "Rubens hat" in the Fashionable Magazine of 1786) and bunched-up skirts.

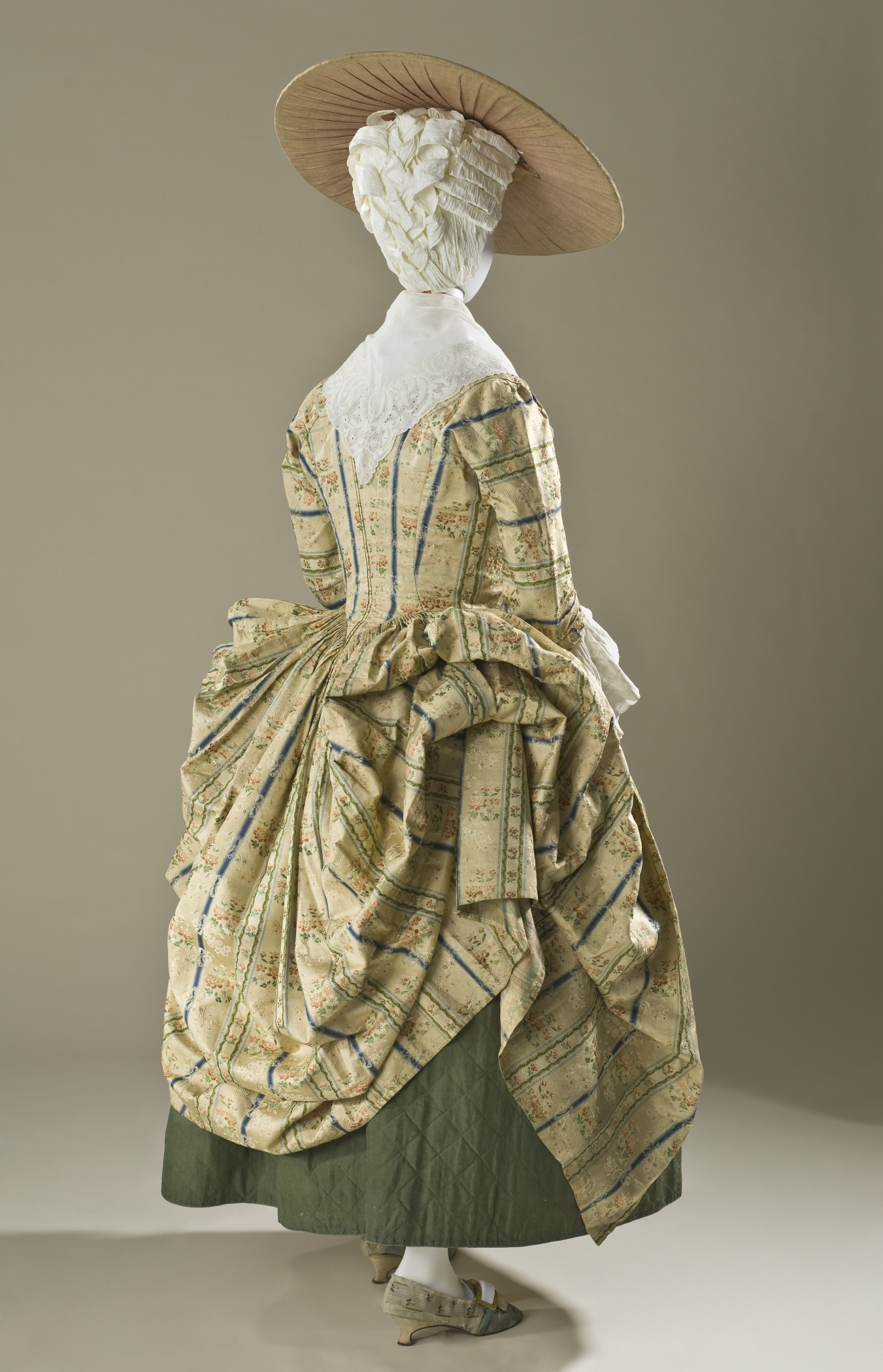
Close-bodied gown with the skirt draped à la polonaise, c. 1775. LACMA, M.70.85.

About the same time, French fashion adopted a number of styles of English origin, such as the close-bodied gown which they called robe à l'anglaise, and the fullness of the skirts at the back waist and over the hips. One way to "create the fashionable bulk at the back and sides of the dress was to kilt up the overskirt by means of interior or exterior loops, buttons or tassels to form swags of material. This style ... was known as à la polonaise." This style was characterized by ankle length petticoats that revealed high-heeled walking shoes. Due to this it served as a practical garment for walking because the skirts did not drag along the ground.

Since the beginning of the 18th century, middle-class women had adopted impromptu ways of kilting their overskirts up out of the muck of the streets. The polonaise was a fashionable variant of this style. The name Polonaise (or polonese) derives "obviously from Polish styles—whether it referred originally to the fur trimming or to the kilting up to one side (a Polish fashion which came from Turkish costume) is not really clear." There is some controversy over application of the name polonaise to 18th century dress. Some sources define it as being cut in the same fashion as a robe à l'anglaise, but with cords pulling up the skirts in two places in the back, and they date the style from the beginning of the 1770s. Others explicitly refute this: Waugh states that the robe à l'anglaise was often equipped with tapes to draw up the skirt, and on the topic of the polonaise says:

Though this term is often applied to any eighteenth-century dress with back drapery, it belongs, strictly speaking, to an over dress that appeared c. 1775. This was cut like the man's coat of the same period, with centre back and two far-back side seams all terminating in inverted pleats, the front being in one piece with an underarm dart. It was caught to the top of the bodice centre front ...

Aileen Ribeiro describes the polonaise as "cut in four parts, two at the front and two at the back," with the bodice closed at the top center front and sloping away at the sides, leaving a triangular gap that was filled by a false waistcoat. Sleeves could be three-quarter length or long, and styles such as the Irish, Italian and French polonaise were described by contemporaries. A variation on the robe à la polonaise was the robe à la circassienne, cut the same but trimmed with "oriental" tassels or fur.

== 19th century usage and revival ==
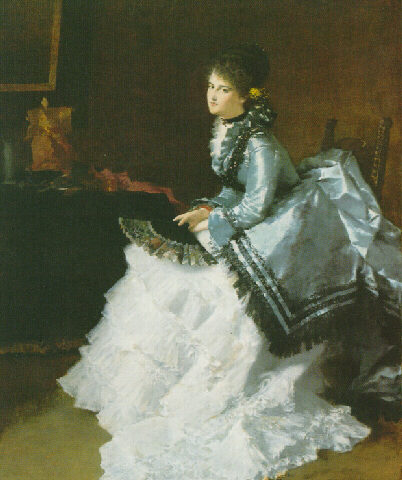
Portrait of Mimi Cramer by Albert von Keller, 1875. The sitter wears a blue silk polonaise basque over a white underskirt.

'Misses' Polonaise Costume,' September 1883.

The term polonaise was applied to a variety of garments throughout the 19th century, often because their styling was thought to be Polish in inspiration. One such example was the witzchoura, a fur-lined cloak with sleeves sometimes described as being à la Polonaise. In May 1868 the Ladies' Monthly Magazine published a coloured fashion plate showing a green silk dress with an asymmetrically opening front described as being made à la Polonaise, along with a pattern for making it up.

During the very late 1860s references to historical dress became fashionable, including draped overskirts loosely based on the 18th century robe à la polonaise. In 1871 Peterson's Magazine stated that the polonaise was an overdress based on the 18th century sacque, with the bodice cut in one with the gathered-up skirt. Peterson's Magazine also described a 'Polonaise basque' as being gathered fully on the hips and forming a deep tunic in the back. Godey's Magazine for August 1871 identifies the term polonaise with two separate garments, a bodice and an overskirt:

Handsome suits of fine foulard, pongee, and silk serge, are simply trimmed with plain bias bands, closely fitting sleeves, and basque waist, or Polonaise; over this a linen Polonaise is worn as a protection, closely buttoned, and trimmed simply with side plaitings, and a Gabrielle front, with three or four deep box-plaits at the back. This style of linen Polonaise can be looped up and worn over a corresponding linen skirt also. [...] Overskirts to the dress, or the Polonaise skirt, must be very long and only looped up at the sides.

[...]

Cretonne costumes are the novelty of the season: they were introduced last year at French watering places, and a few have been imported here this season. They are intended for country wear only, and are made of the chintz figured cretonnes used for upholstering furniture; the grounds are black, brown, green, blue, buff, with large brilliant colored flowers and figures. They are made with a ruffled skirt and Polonaise, caught up by large bows of black velvet. These costumes certainly carry us back to the days of our grandmothers, and will, we fear, meet with but little favor for a season; but if fashion decrees, there will always be some to follow her mandate.

The second paragraph quoted describes a specific style of dressing à la polonaise which was popularly known as "Dolly Varden" after the heroine of Dickens' historical novel Barnaby Rudge (set in 1780).

By the end of the 1870s and into the 1880s, the term 'polonaise' also described an overdress which resembled a long coat worn over an underskirt, sometimes with a waistcoat effect. This could be draped or undraped. In July 1894, The Sydney Mail stated:

Polonaises are also returned to favour, not only as seen in the long straight pelisse, which, fur-trimmed, is the most fashionable of garments, but with the skirt portion drawn up at the hips; this produces the wavy folds as in the draperies of 20 years ago.

== 20th century ==
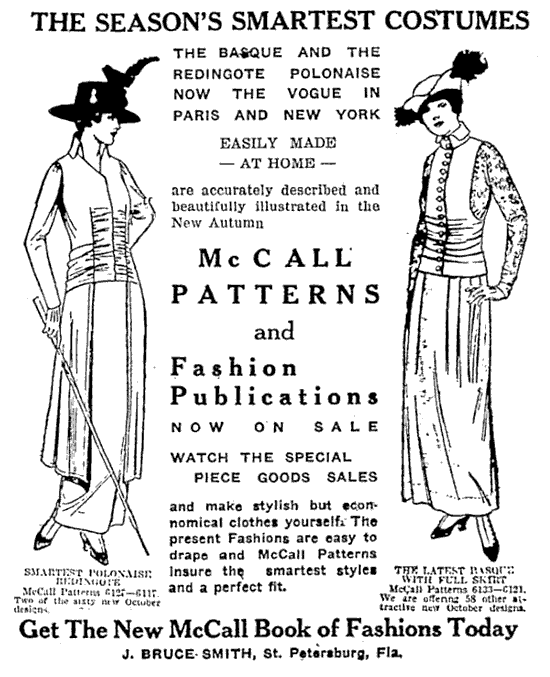
1914 McCall advertisement featuring a redingote polonaise (left)

The polonaise underwent another revival in the mid-late 1910s. A 1914 newspaper advert for McCall Patterns found in the Evening Independent announced the 'redingote polonaise' to be the height of fashion in Paris and New York. The Reading Eagle ran a fashion column in November 1915 describing the polonaise of 1914/15 as a French design consisting of a long coat-like overdress of metallic lace or elaborately decorated sheer fabric worn over a plain underdress. Another version of the polonaise was described by the Meriden Daily Journal in September 1917:

Possibly the struggles through which Poland is going, unfortunate Poland with her great genius and her greater misery, have tempted the French to reflect her present disaster in a costume. In the adaptation of the polonaise to modern requirements the floating panels at the side are featured as the main thing. Each designer has tried them out in an individual manner. Usually they are lined with a contrasting colour and fabric. Old gold and Chinese blue alternate with pearl and slate grey as chosen linings. When the polonaise is of dark red velvet or black the lining is of cream or dead white. If we wear it next winter as Paris is showing it at the present moment it will further the evident inclination of the designers and the public to strengthen the fashionable position of the present skirt.

After the First World War the term fell out of regular use, although was occasionally used by fashion writers as a descriptive term in the 1930s-50s for any form of draping around the upper skirt. For example, the Ottawa Citizen in 1942 stated:

Black Lyons velvet is seen for dinner gowns, some appliqued with heavy Venice lace which often is draped to form a polonaise line in a slim apron effect at the front of the skirt. Actual polonaise drapery softens the skirts of brocaded black silk dinner dresses, an old fashioned quality enhanced by the addition of high feathered dinner hats.

== Gallery ==
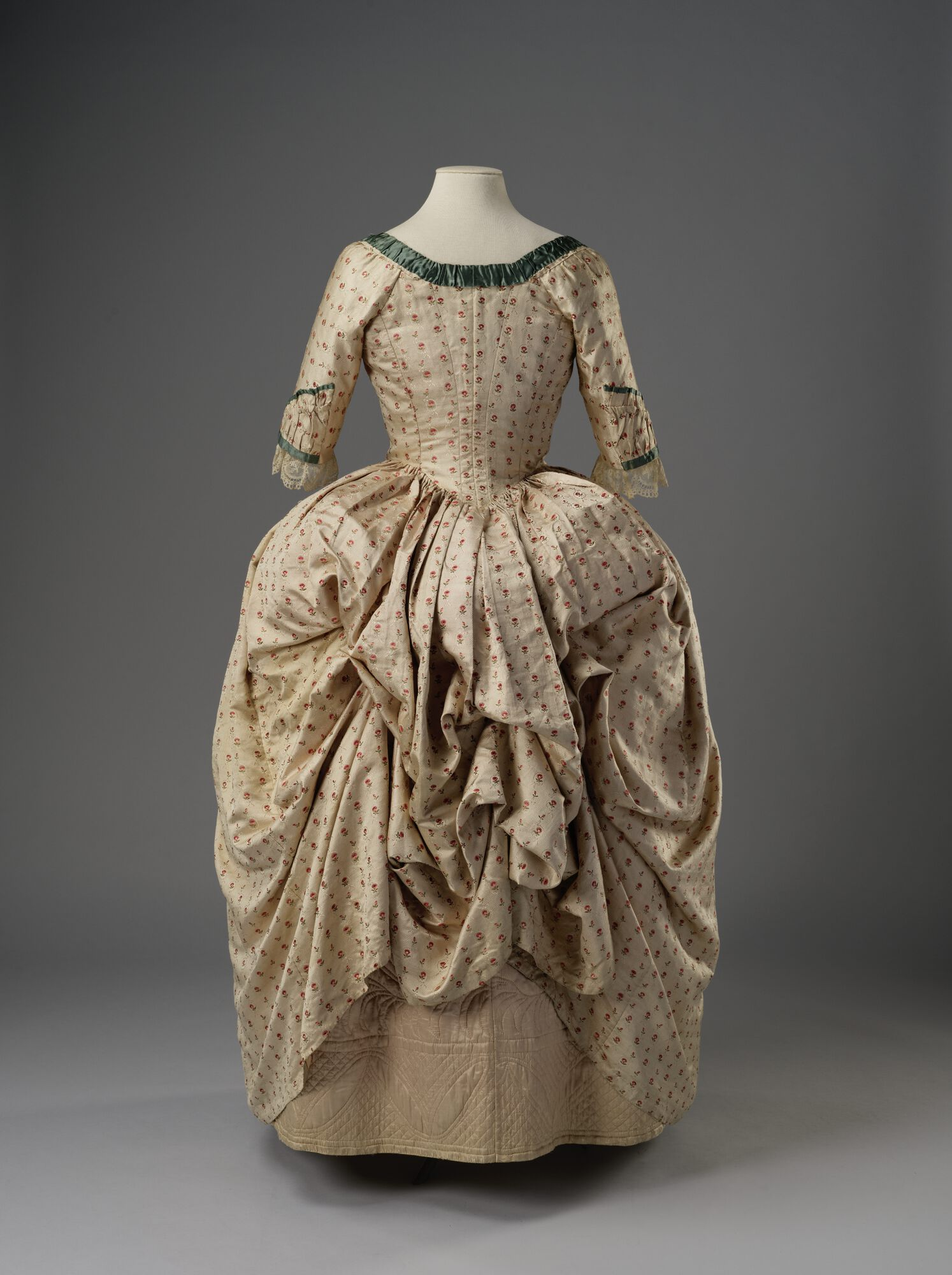
Close-bodied gown with skirt draped 'a la polonaise', MMH.2011.0014, Modemuseum Hasselt

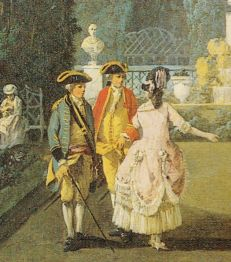
Polonaise, detail of Jean-Baptiste Pillement's Les Jardins de Benfica, 1785.

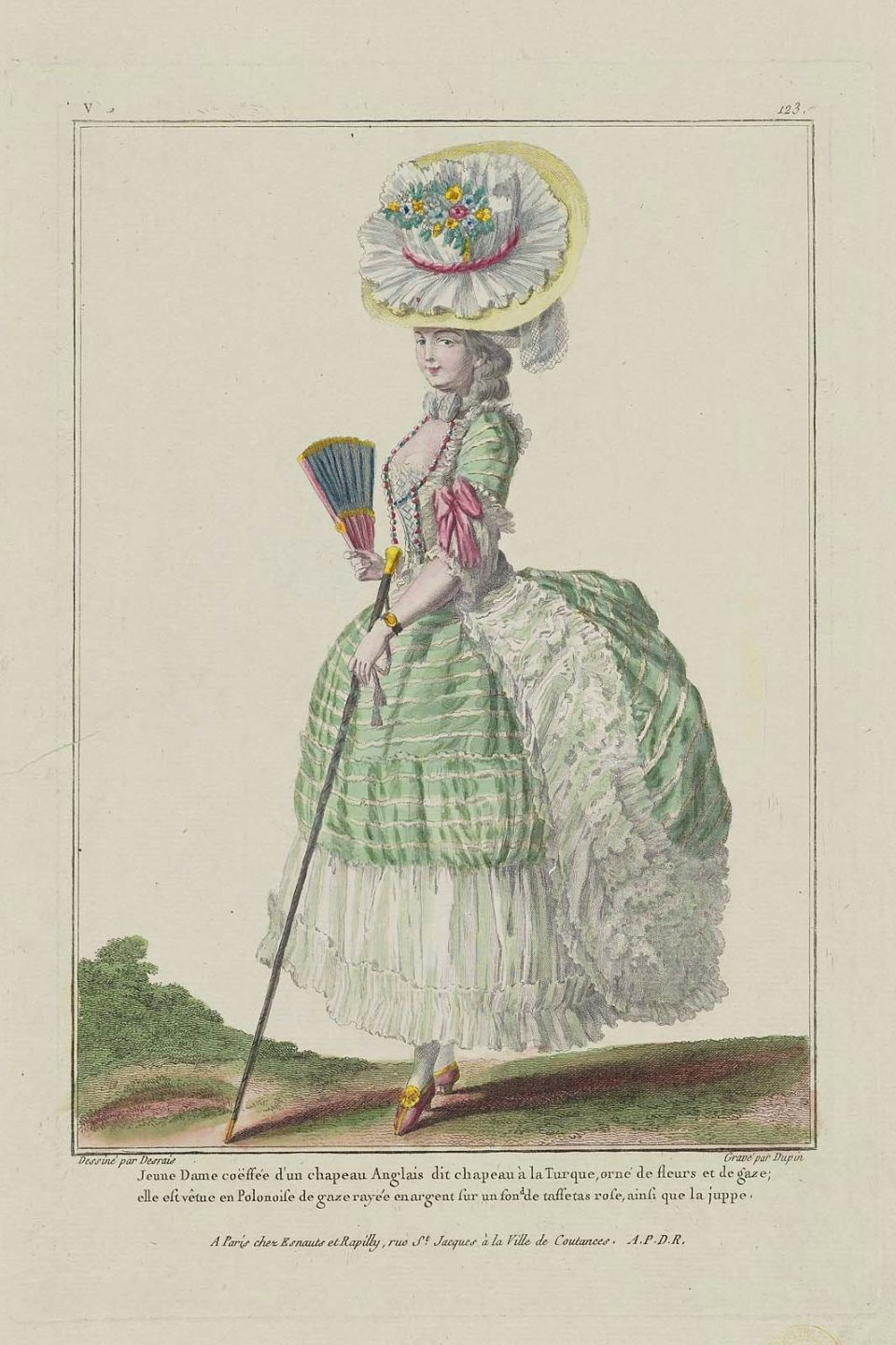
Jeune Dame ... vêtue en Polonoise, French, Gallerie des Modes, 1779. Museum of Fine Arts, Boston, 44.1400.

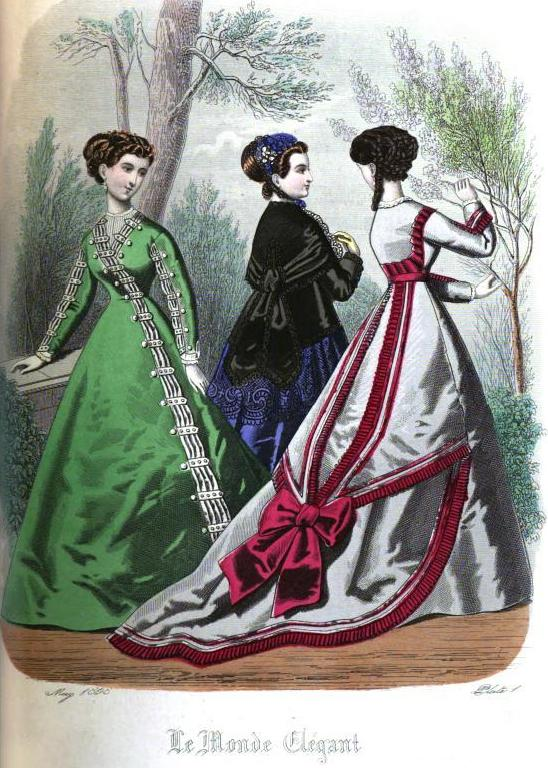
The Ladies' Monthly Magazine, May 1868. Green silk dress made à la Polonaise by Madame Prost, Boulevard des Italiens, Paris, shown with two other dresses.

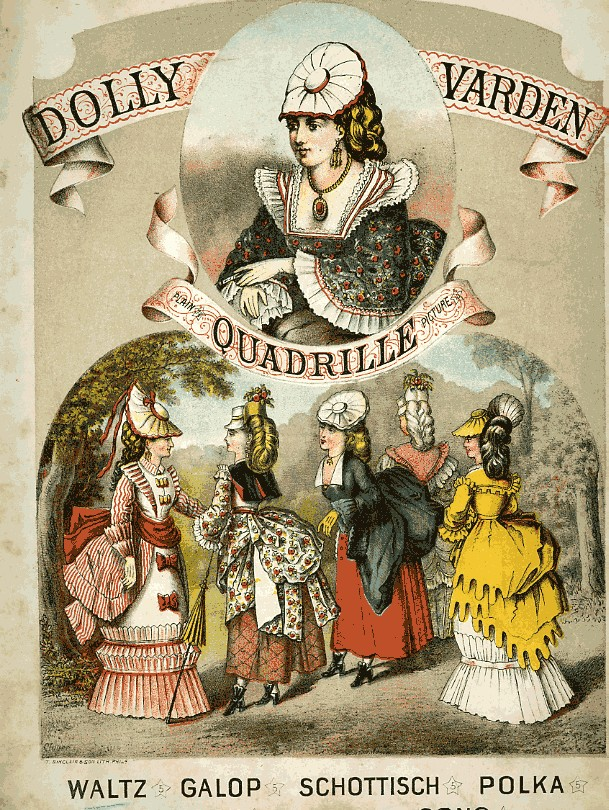
Music sheet cover showing Dolly Varden outfits, 1872.
