= Witzchoura =

Type of cloak

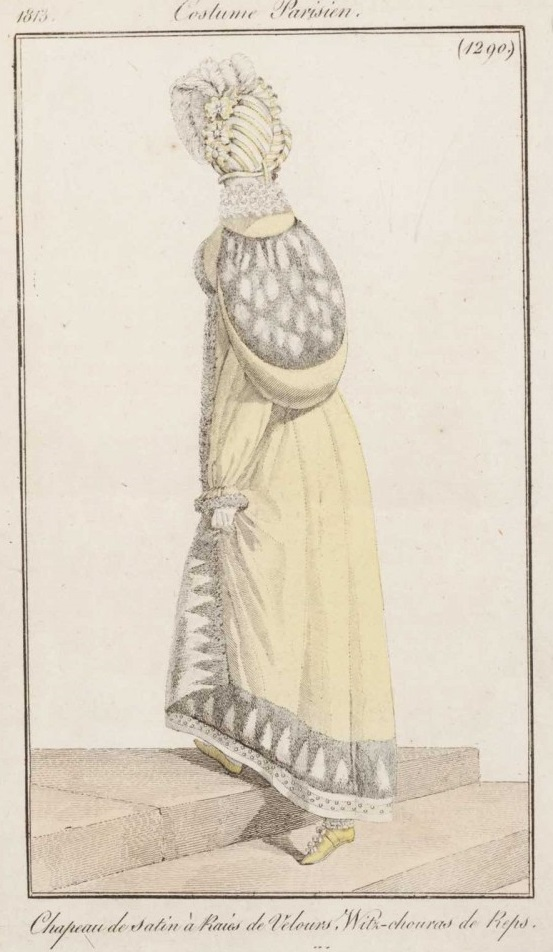
1813 fashion plate showing a 'Witz-chouras' with sleeves, fur lining and hood.

A witzchoura (sometimes witz-chouras) was a type of mantle, pelisse, or sleeved cloak, with a large collar and, sometimes, a hood, that was particularly fashionable in the early 19th century. The term derives from the Polish word wilczura, meaning 'wolfskin'. It was inspired by Polish styles, hence sometimes being described as à la Polonaise, although it is not the same as the gown called a polonaise. Like the original hussar's pelisse, it was typically lined with fur.

The witzchoura is said to have emerged about 1808, soon after Napoleon met with his Polish mistress, Marie Walewska, and was worn throughout the first half of the 19th century. Versions of the witzchoura were still being worn for travelling in 1849.
