= Barrel sash =

Type of sash traditionally worn by hussars

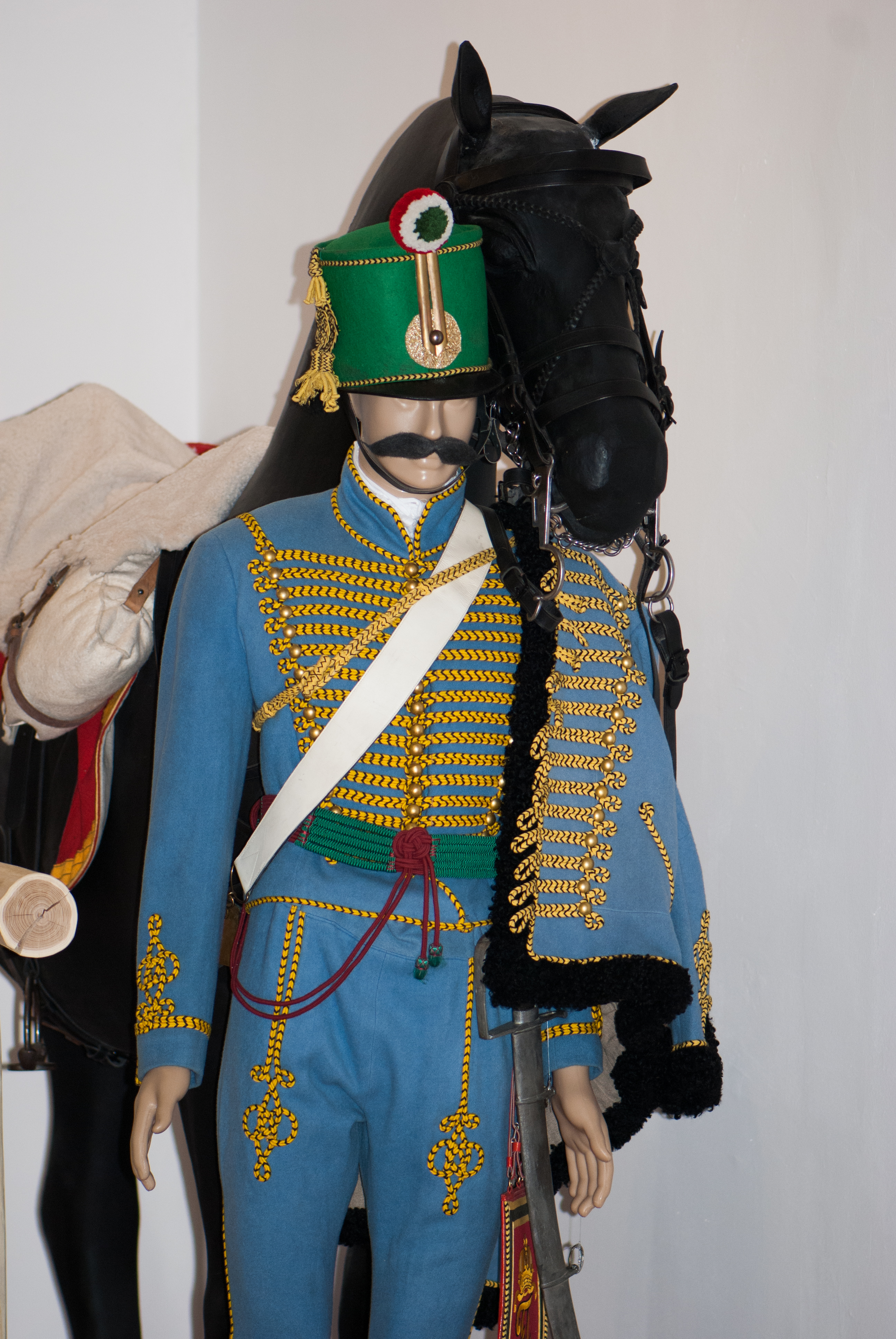
This Hungarian Hussar's uniform shows a barrel sash around the waist in deep red and green

A barrel sash, also called a rope-and-barrel sash, is a form of belt traditionally worn by military units known as hussars as well as by bag pipers. It comprises a series of cords which are threaded through tubular metal "barrels" and worn around the waist. The tassels sometimes seen hanging from this garment are the ends of cords which come from around the back of the wearer.

The barrel tubes that comprise the sash are always arranged in three columns, though the number of barrels per column on a given sash may number between three and six.
