= Mantle (clothing) =

Loose or semi-fitted overgarment

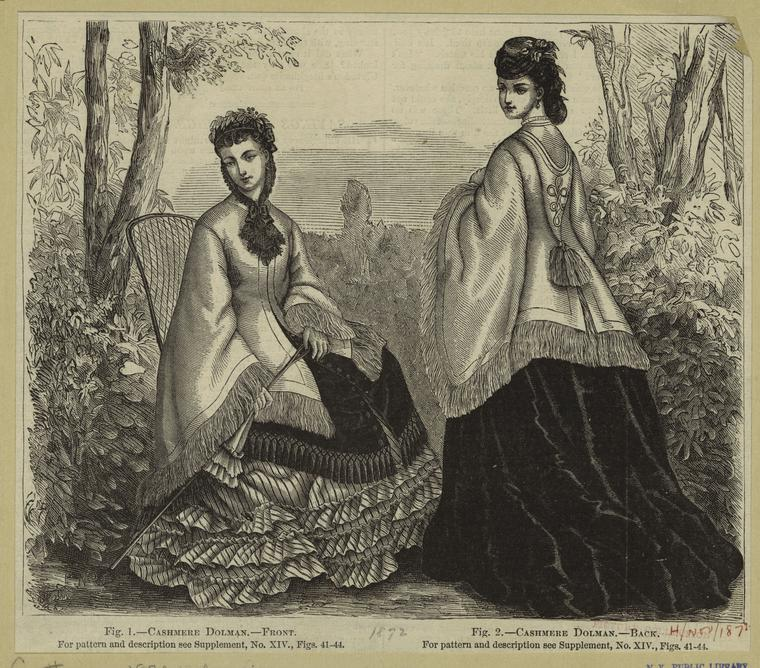
Woman's dolman mantle, front and back views. Harper's Bazaar, November 1871

A mantle (from old French mantel, from mantellum, the Latin term for a cloak) is a type of loose garment usually worn over indoor clothing to serve the same purpose as an overcoat. Technically, the term describes a long, loose cape-like cloak worn from the 12th to the 16th century by both sexes, although by the 19th century, it was used to describe any loose-fitting, shaped outer garment similar to a cape. For example, the dolman, a 19th-century cape-like woman's garment with partial sleeves is often described as a mantle.

In English, the idiom "to take up/pick up/assume the mantle" is from the Bible, and means to take a position of authority, leadership or responsibility in a particular area, especially in the sense of carrying on for a previous figure. The most notable appearance in the Bible is in 2 Kings 2:13, where Elisha takes up Elijah's mantle (Hebrew: אדרת ’addereṯ).

== Mantelets ==
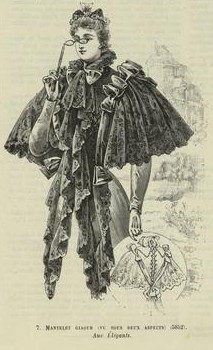
Mantelet, French, 1895

A variation on the mantle is the mantelet (also spelled mantelot and mantlet), typically describing a short version of the mantle. The term appears as early as 1386, in "The Knight's Tale" by Geoffrey Chaucer. In the 18th century, a mantelet was a woman's short cloak, and in the early 19th century, it was an ornamental scarf that crossed over the chest and tied behind, usually made of fur or lace. By the end of the 19th century, a mantelet was a woman's shoulder cape with elongated ends in front, sometimes held in position by a belt at the waist.

== See also ==
- Mantle (monastic vesture)
- Mantle (royal garment)
- Gas mantle
- Mantlet (also sometimes spelt "mantelet") - a portable protection wall used in military operations
- Witzchoura, a 19th-century mantle or cloak
