= 1775–1795 in Western fashion =

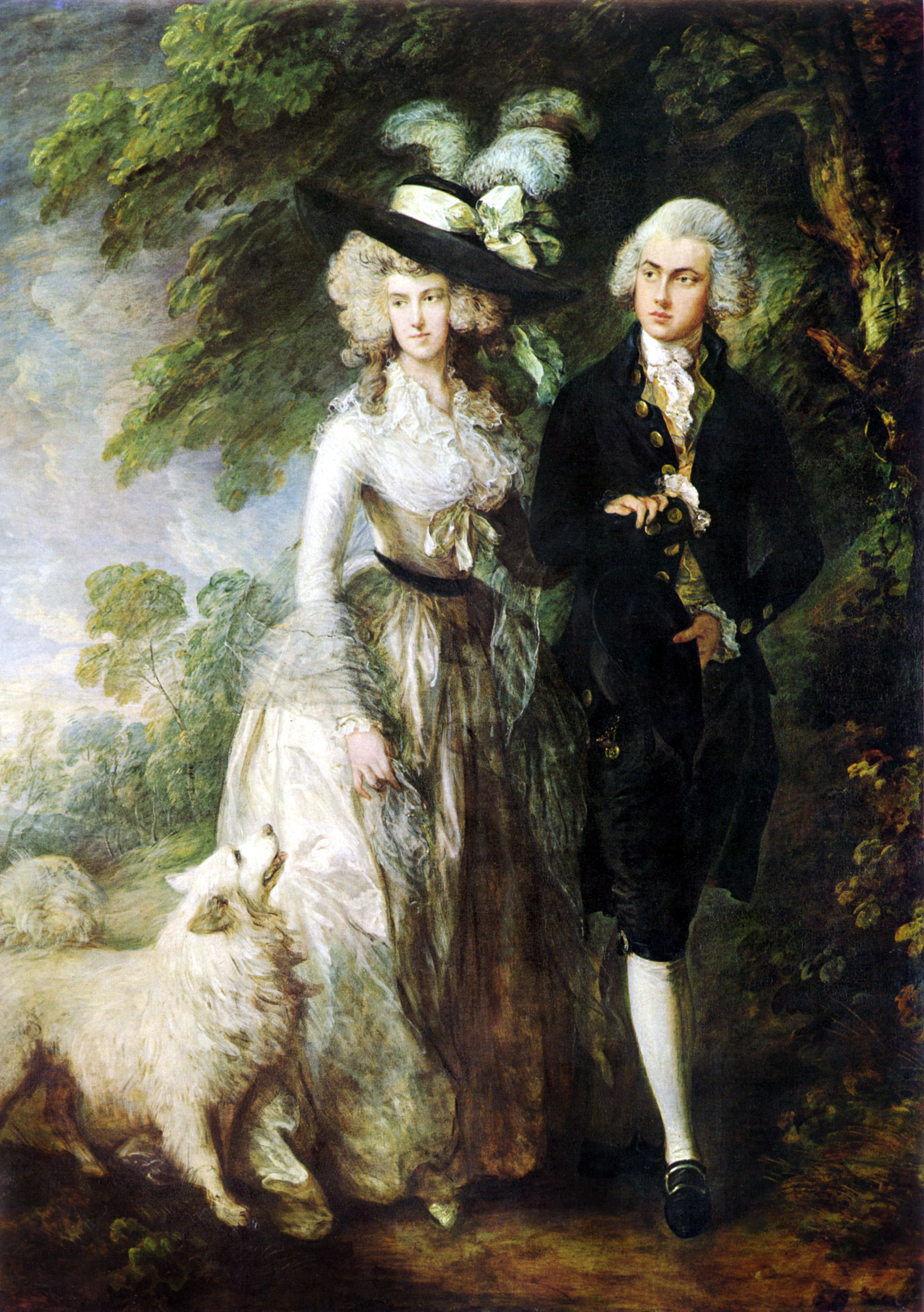
Thomas Gainsborough, The Morning Walk (portrait of Mr and Mrs William Hallett), 1785

Fashion in the twenty years between 1775 and 1795 in Western culture became simpler and less elaborate. These changes were a result of emerging modern ideals of selfhood, the declining fashionability of highly elaborate Rococo styles, and the widespread embrace of the rationalistic or "classical" ideals of Enlightenment philosophes.

== Enlightenment concept of "fashion" ==
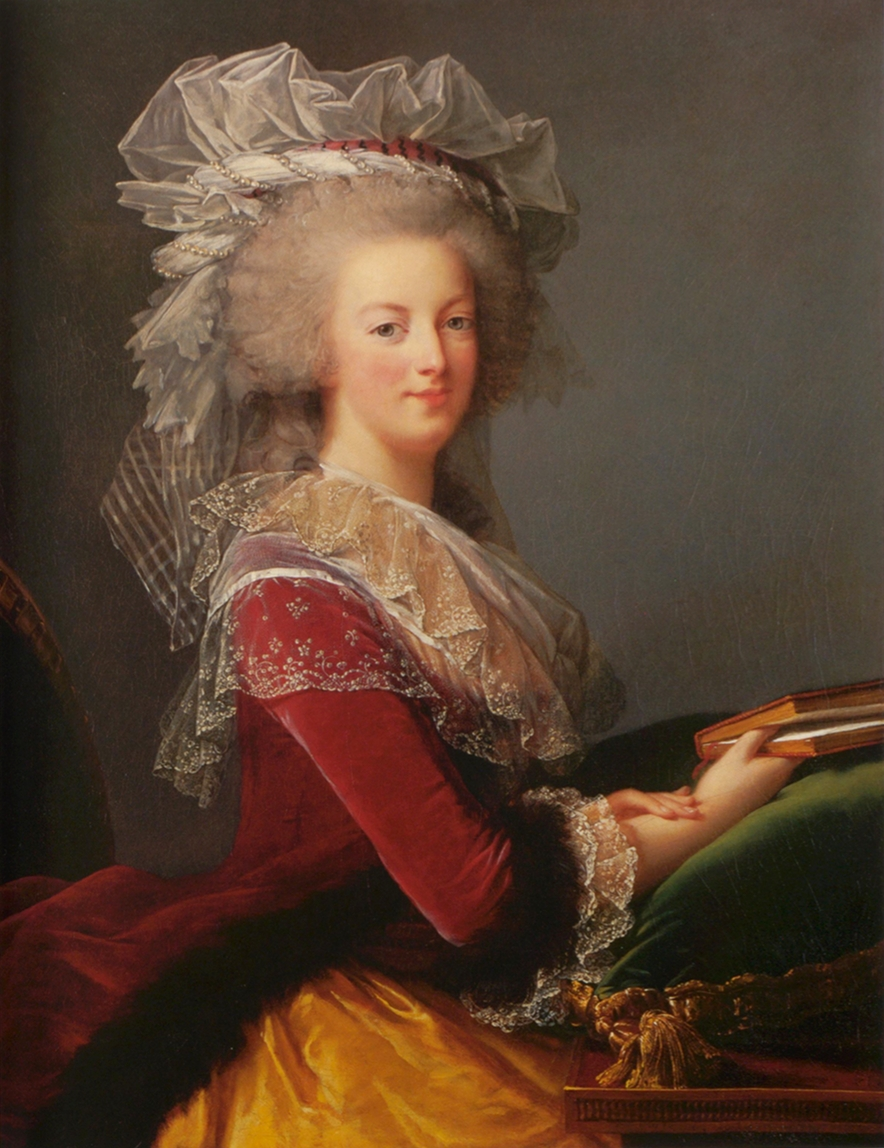
1785: Marie Antoinette by Élisabeth Vigée Le Brun; she wears the popularized turban, with a scarf wrapped around it. Her collar is heavy with lace, and her crimson petticoat is trimmed in fur.

According to some historians, it was at this time when the concept of fashion, as it is known today, was established (others date it much earlier). Prior to this point, clothes as a means of self-expression were limited. Previously, guild-controlled systems of production and distribution and the sumptuary laws made clothing both expensive and difficult to acquire for the majority of people. However, by 1750 the consumer revolution brought about cheaper copies of fashionable styles, allowing members of all classes to partake in fashionable dress. Thus, fashion began to express the self.

== French Revolution ==
As the radicals and Jacobins became more powerful, there was a revulsion against high-fashion because of its extravagance and its association with royalty and aristocracy. It was replaced with a sort of "anti-fashion" for men and women that emphasized simplicity and modesty. The men wore plain, dark clothing and short unpowdered hair. During the Terror of 1794, the workaday outfits of the sans-culottes symbolized Jacobin egalitarianism.

High fashion and extravagance returned to France and its satellite states under the Directory, 1795–99, with its "directoire" styles; the men did not return to extravagant customs. These trends would reach their height in the classically styled fashions of the late 1790s and early 19th century. For men, coats, waistcoats and stockings of previous decades continued to be fashionable across the Western world, although they too changed silhouette in this period, becoming slimmer and using earthier colors and more matte fabrics.

== Women's fashion ==
=== Overview ===
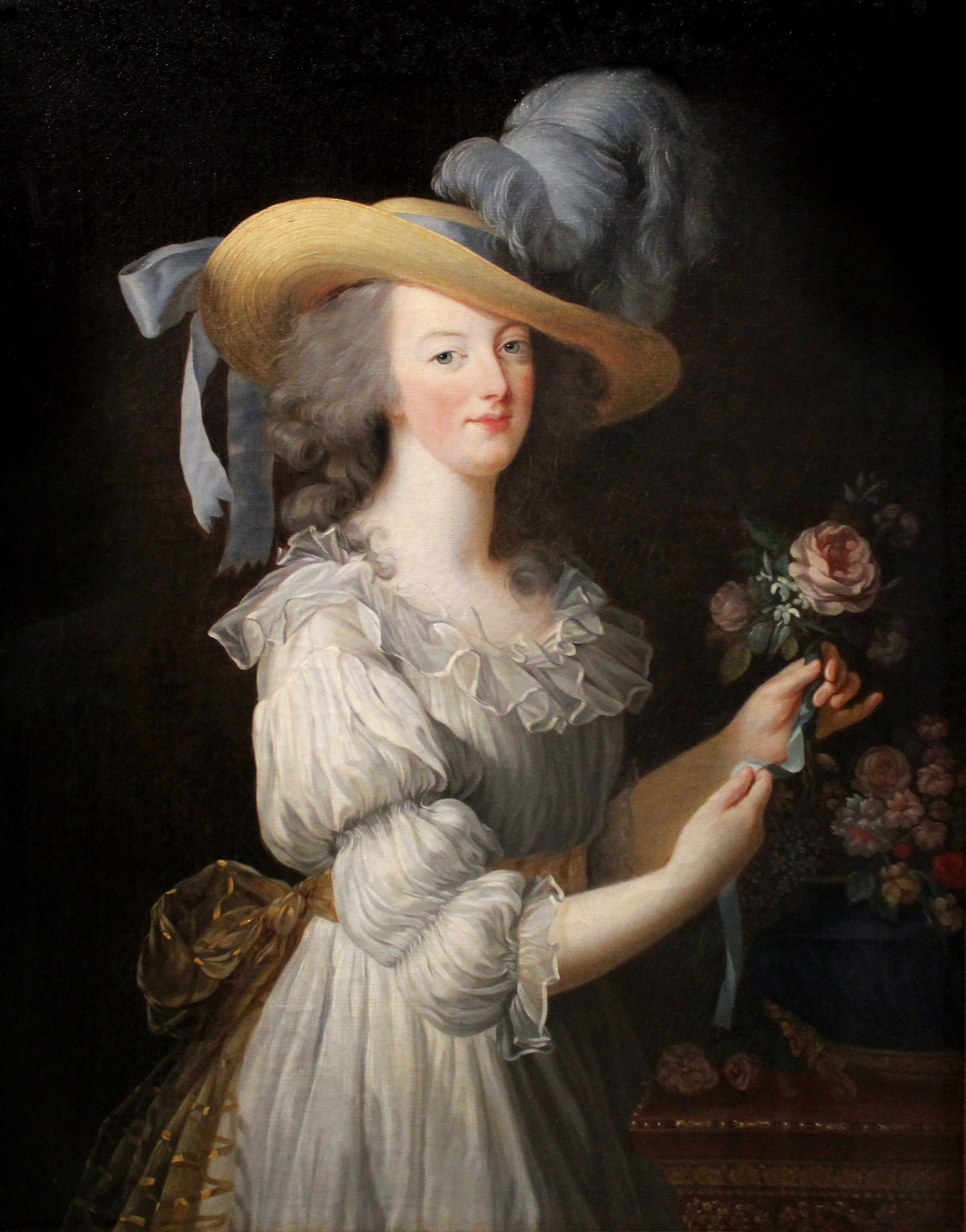
This 1783 portrait, Marie-Antoinette en chemise ou en gaulle by Élisabeth Vigée Le Brun both caused a scandal and influenced a fashion transition.

Women's clothing styles maintained an emphasis on the conical shape of the torso while the shape of the skirts changed throughout the period. The wide panniers (holding the skirts out at the side) for the most part disappeared by 1780 for all but the most formal court functions, and false rumps (bum-pads or hip-pads) were worn for a time.

Marie Antoinette had a marked influence on French fashion beginning in the 1780s. Around this time, she had begun to rebel against the structure of court life. She abolished her morning toilette and escaped to the Petit Trianon with increasing frequency, leading to criticism of her exclusivity by cutting off the traditional right of the aristocracy to their monarch. Marie Antoinette found refuge from the stresses of the rigidity of court life and the scrutiny of the public eye, the ailing health of her children, and her sense of powerlessness in her marriage by carrying out a pseudo-country life in her newly constructed hameau. She and an elite circle of friends would dress in peasant clothing and straw hats and retreat to the hameau. It was out of this practice that her style of dress evolved.

By tradition, a lady of the court was instantly recognizable by the panniers, corset, and weighty silk materials that constructed her gown in the style à la française or à l'anglaise. By doing away with these things, Marie Antoinette's gaulle or chemise à la Reine stripped female aristocrats of their traditional identity; noblewomen could now be confused with peasant girls, confusing long standing sartorial differences in class. The chemise was made from a white muslin and the queen was further accused of importing foreign fabrics and crippling the French silk industry. The gaulle consisted of thin layers of this muslin, loosely draped around the body and belted at the waist, and was often worn with an apron and a fichu. This trend was quickly adopted by fashionable women in France and England, but upon the debut of the portrait of Marie Antoinette by Elisabeth Vigée-Lebrun, the clothing style created a scandal and increased the hatred for the queen. The queen's clothing in the portrait looked like a chemise, nothing more than a garment that women wore under her other clothing or to lounge in the intimate space of the private boudoir. It was perceived to be indecent, and especially unbecoming for the queen. The sexual nature of the gaulle undermined the notions of status and the ideology that gave her and kept her in power. Marie Antoinette wanted to be private and individual, a notion unbecoming for a member of the monarchy that is supposed to act as a symbol of the state.

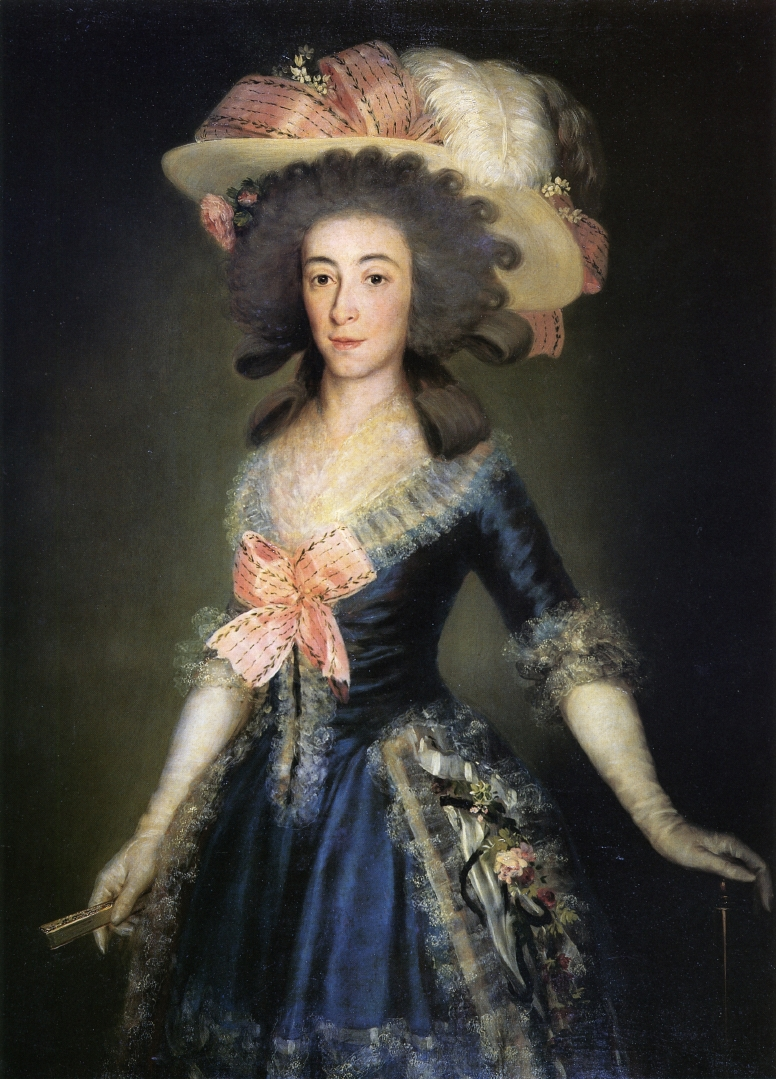
Spain, 1785, by Goya

When Marie Antoinette turned thirty, she decided it was no longer decent for her to dress in this way and returned to more acceptable courtly styles, though she still dressed her children in the style of the gaulle, which may have continued to reflect badly on the opinion of their mother even though she was making visible efforts to rein in her own previous fashion excess. However, despite the distaste with the queen's inappropriate fashions, and her own switch back to traditional dress later in life, the gaulle became a popular garment in both France and abroad. Despite its controversial beginnings, the simplicity of the style and material became the custom and had a great influence on the transition into the neoclassical styles of the late 1790s.

During the years of the French Revolution, women's dress expanded into different types of national costume. Women wore variations of white skirts, topped with revolutionary colored striped jackets, as well as white Greek chemise gowns, accessorized with shawls, scarves, and ribbons.

By 1790, skirts were still somewhat full, but they were no longer obviously pushed out in any particular direction (though a slight bustle pad might still be worn). The "pouter-pigeon" front came into style (many layers of cloth pinned over the bodice), but in other respects women's fashions were starting to be simplified by influences from Englishwomen's country outdoors wear (thus the "redingote" was the French pronunciation of an English "riding coat"), and from neo-classicism. By 1795, waistlines were somewhat raised, preparing the way for the development of the empire silhouette and unabashed neo-classicism of late 1790s fashions.

=== Gowns ===
The usual fashion at the beginning of the period was a low-necked gown (usually called in French a robe), worn over a petticoat. Most gowns had skirts that opened in front to show the petticoat worn beneath. As part of the general simplification of dress, the open bodice with a separate stomacher was replaced by a bodice with edges that met center front.

The robe à la française or sack-back gown, with back pleats hanging loosely from the neckline, long worn as court fashion, made its last appearance early in this period. A fitted bodice held the front of the gown closely to the figure.

The robe à l'anglaise or close-bodied gown featured back pleats sewn in place to fit closely to the body, and then released into the skirt which would be draped in various ways. Elaborate draping "à la polonaise" became fashionable by the mid-1770s, featuring backs of the gowns' skirts pulled up into swags either through loops or through the pocket slits of the gown.

Front-wrapping thigh-length shortgowns or bedgowns of lightweight printed cotton fabric remained fashionable at-home morning wear, worn with petticoats. Over time, bedgowns became the staple upper garment of British and American female working-class street wear. Women would also often wear a neck handkerchief or a more formal lace modesty piece, particularly on lower cut dresses, often for modesty reasons. In surviving artwork, there are few women depicted wearing bedgowns without a handkerchief. These large handkerchiefs could be of linen, plain, colored or of printed cotton for working wear. Wealthy women wore handkerchiefs of fine, sheer fabrics, often trimmed with lace or embroidery with their expensive gowns.

=== Jackets and redingotes ===
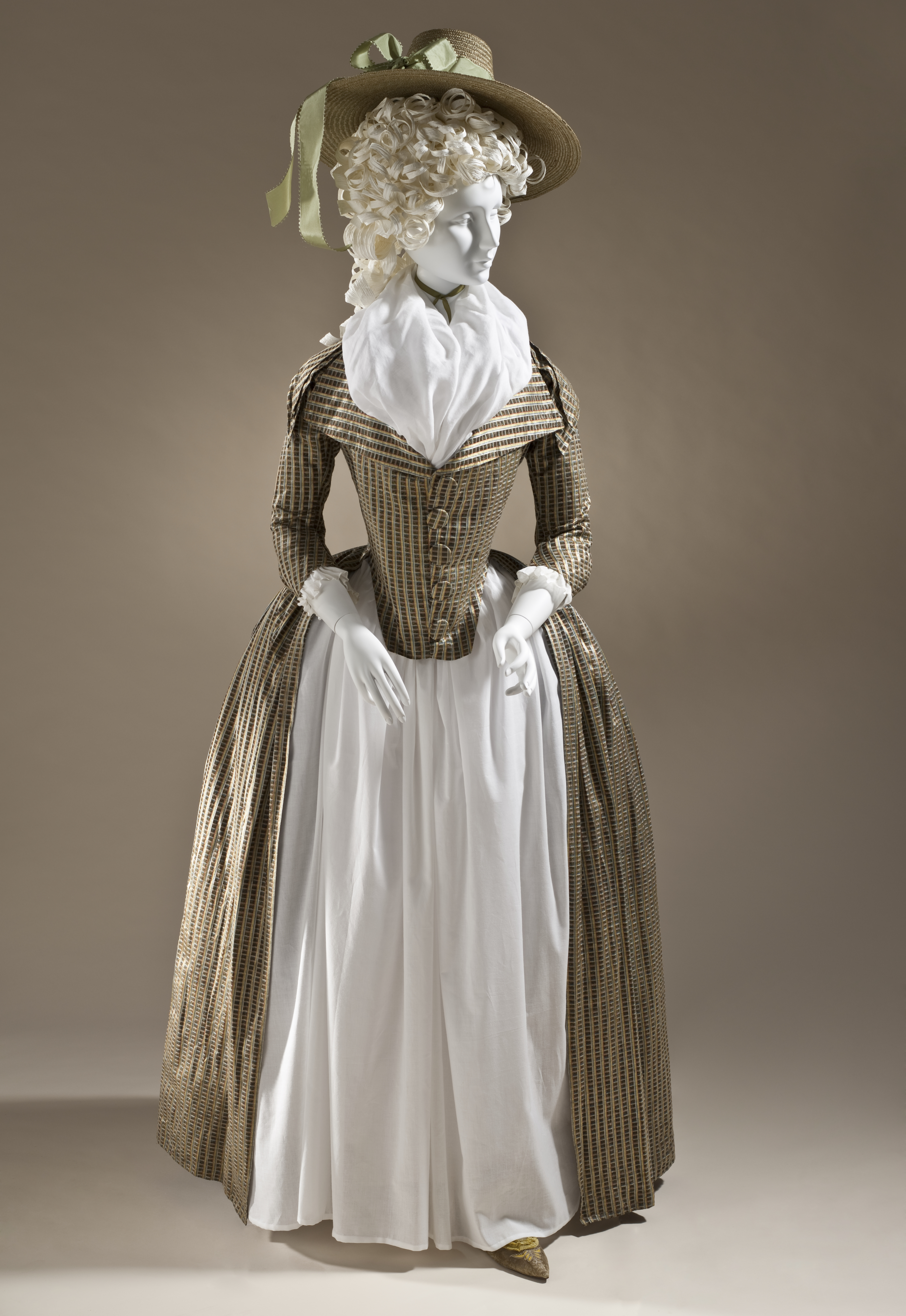
Woman's redingote c. 1790, Los Angeles County Museum of Art

An informal alternative to the dress was a costume of a jacket and petticoat, based on working class fashion but executed in finer fabrics with a tighter fit.

The caraco was a jacket-like bodice worn with a petticoat, with elbow-length sleeves. By the 1790s, caracos had full-length, tight sleeves.

As in previous periods, the traditional riding habit consisted of a tailored jacket like a man's coat, worn with a high-necked shirt, a waistcoat, a petticoat, and a hat. Alternatively, the jacket and a false waistcoat-front might be a made as a single garment, and later in the period a simpler riding jacket and petticoat (without waistcoat) could be worn.

Another alternative to the traditional habit was a coat-dress called a joseph or riding coat (borrowed in French as redingote), usually of unadorned or simply trimmed woolen fabric, with full-length, tight sleeves and a broad collar with lapels or revers. The redingote was later worn as an overcoat with the light-weight chemise dress.

=== Underwear ===
The shift, chemise (in France), or smock, had a low neckline and elbow-length sleeves which were full early in the period and became increasingly narrow as the century progressed. Drawers were not worn in this period.

Strapless stays were cut high at the armpit, to encourage a woman to stand with her shoulders slightly back, a fashionable posture. The fashionable shape was a rather conical torso, with large hips. The waist was not particularly small. Stays were usually laced snugly, but comfortably; only those interested in extreme fashions laced tightly. They offered back support for heavy lifting, and poor and middle-class women were able to work comfortably in them. As the relaxed, country fashion took hold in France, stays were sometimes replaced by a lightly boned garment called "un corset," though this style did not achieve popularity in England, where stays remained standard through the end of the period.

Panniers or side-hoops remained an essential of court fashion but disappeared everywhere else in favor of a few petticoats. Free-hanging pockets were tied around the waist and were accessed through pocket slits in the side-seams of the gown or petticoat. Woolen or quilted waistcoats were worn over the stays or corset and under the gown for warmth, as were petticoats quilted with wool batting, especially in the cold climates of Northern Europe and America.

=== Footwear and accessories ===
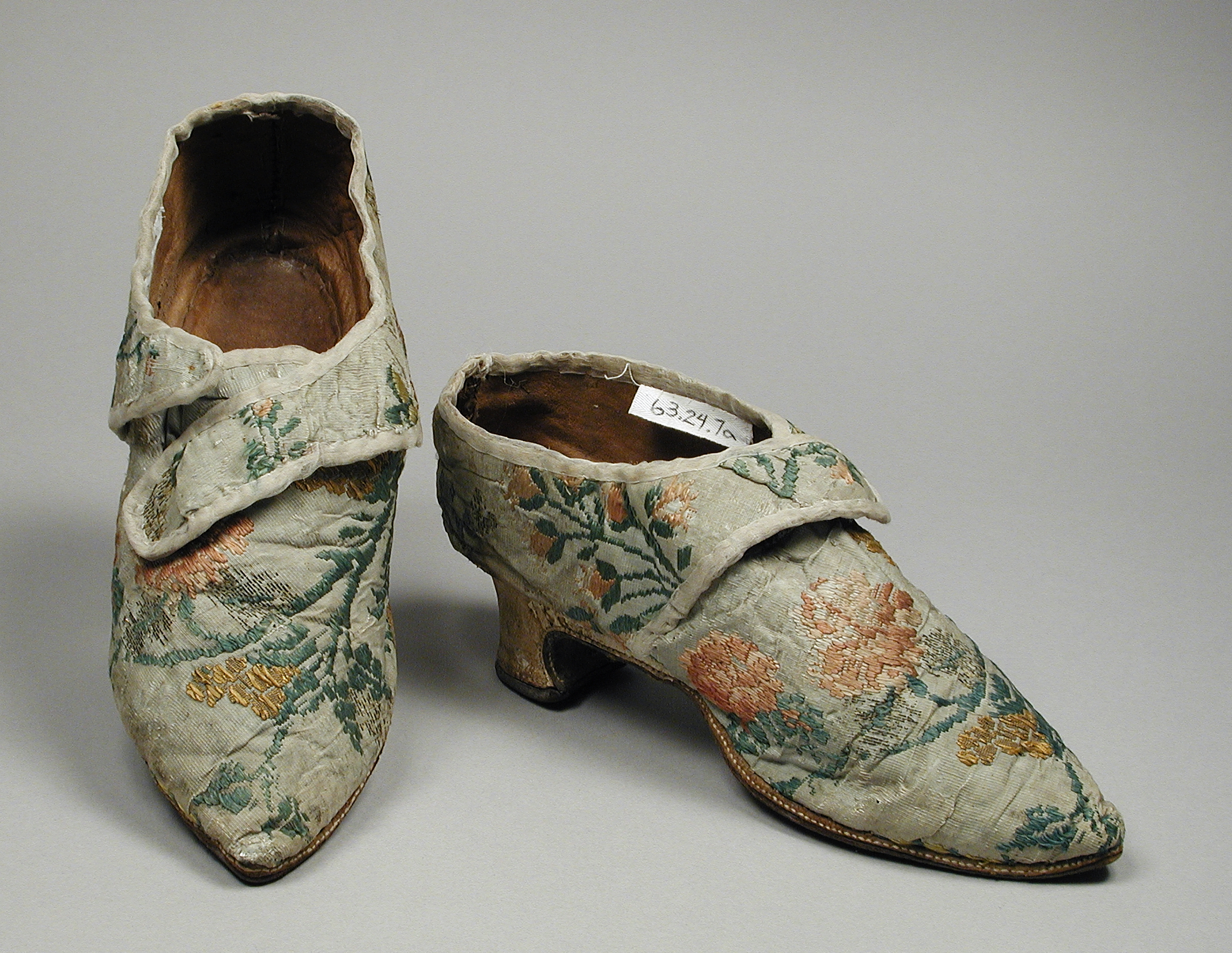
Woman's silk brocade shoes with straps for shoe buckles, probably Italy, 1770s, LACMA

Shoes had high, curved heels (the origin of modern "louis heels") and were made of fabric or leather. Shoe buckles remained fashionable until they were abandoned along with high-heeled footwear and other aristocratic fashions in the years after the French Revolution, The long upper also was eliminated, essentially leaving only the toes of the foot covered. The slippers that were ordinarily worn with shoes were abandoned because the shoes had become comfortable enough to be worn without them. Fans continued to be popular in this time period, however, they were increasingly replaced, outdoors at least, by the parasol. Indoors the fan was still carried exclusively. Additionally, women began using walking sticks.

=== Hairstyles and headgear ===
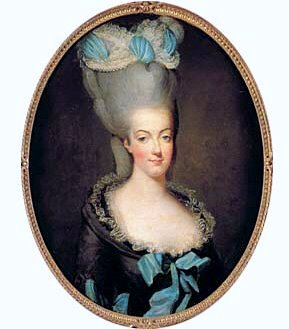
Marie Antoinette, Queen of France, was one of the most influential figures in fashion during the 1770s and 1780s, especially when it came to hairstyles.

The 1770s were notable for extreme hairstyles and wigs which were built up very high, and often incorporated decorative objects (sometimes symbolic, as in the case of the famous engraving depicting a lady wearing a large ship in her hair with masts and sails—called the "Coiffure à l'Indépendance ou le Triomphe de la liberté"—to celebrate naval victory in the American War of Independence). These coiffures were parodied in several famous satirical caricatures of the period.

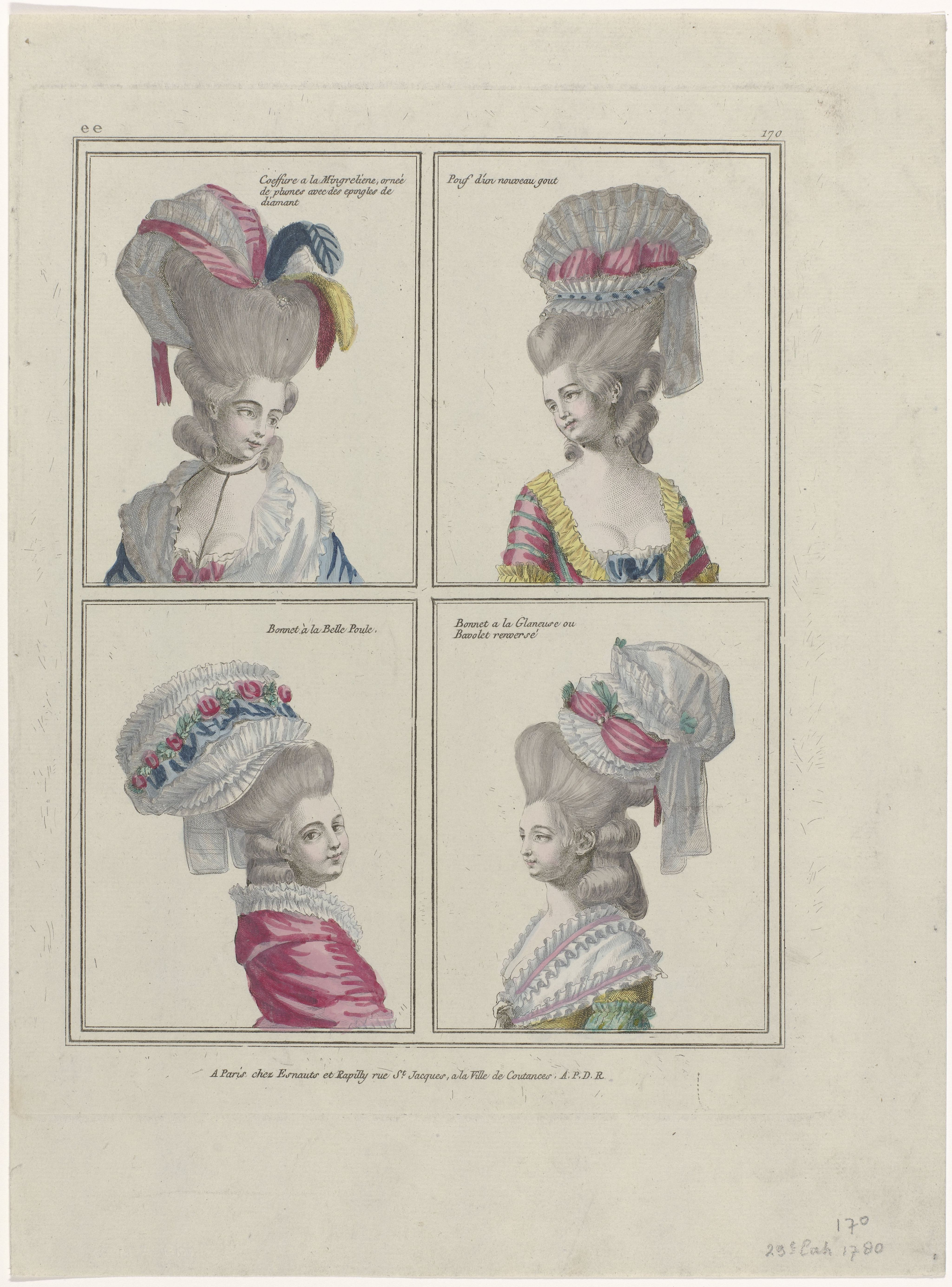
Fashionable hairstyles from Galerie des Modes et Costumes Français 1780

By the 1780s, elaborate hats replaced the former elaborate hairstyles. Mob caps and other "country" styles were worn indoors. Flat, broad-brimmed and low-crowned straw "shepherdess" hats tied on with ribbons were worn with the new rustic styles.

Hair was powdered into the early 1780s, but the new fashion required natural colored hair, often dressed simply in a mass of curls.

=== Style gallery ===
==== 1775–1789 ====
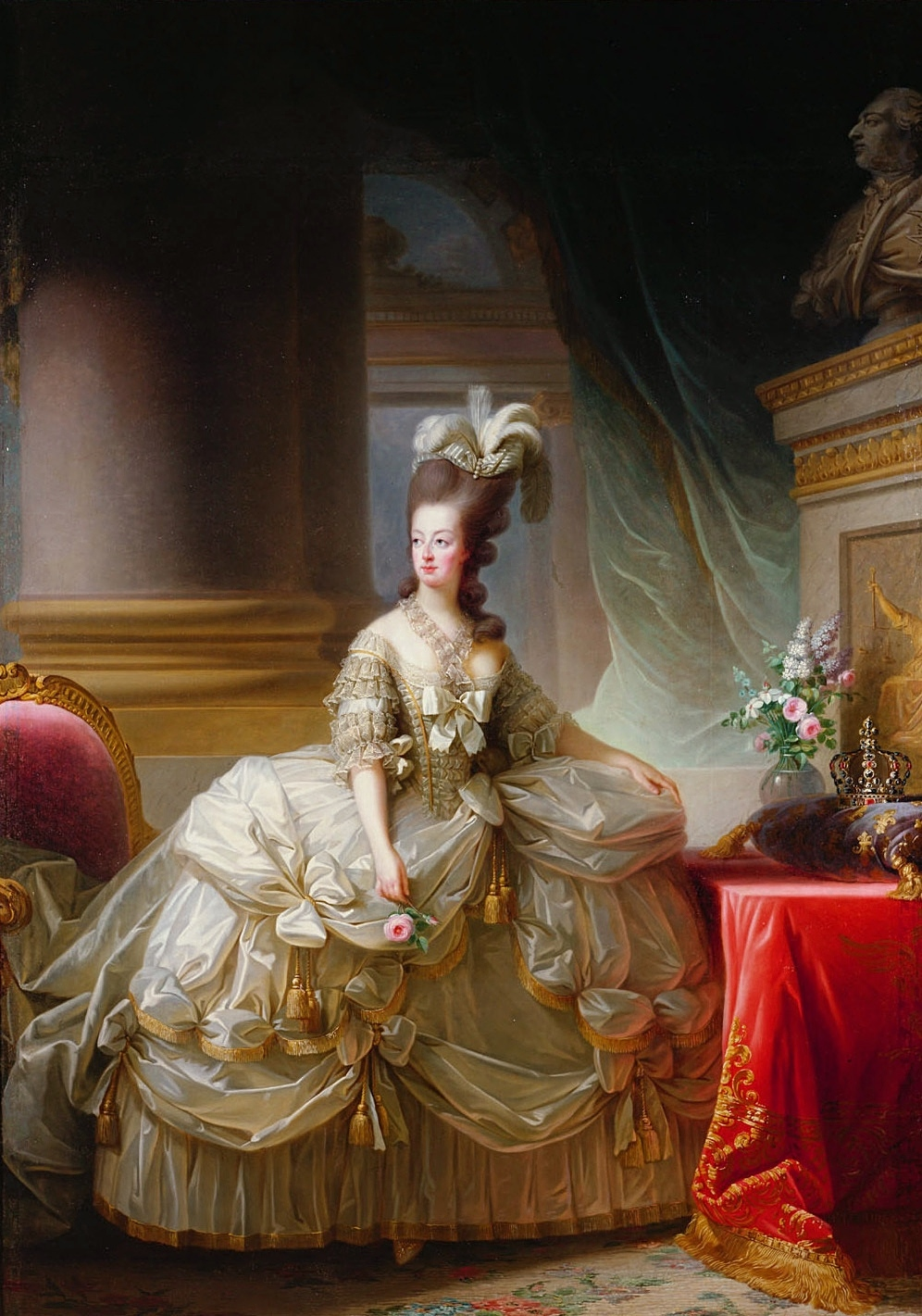
1 – 1778

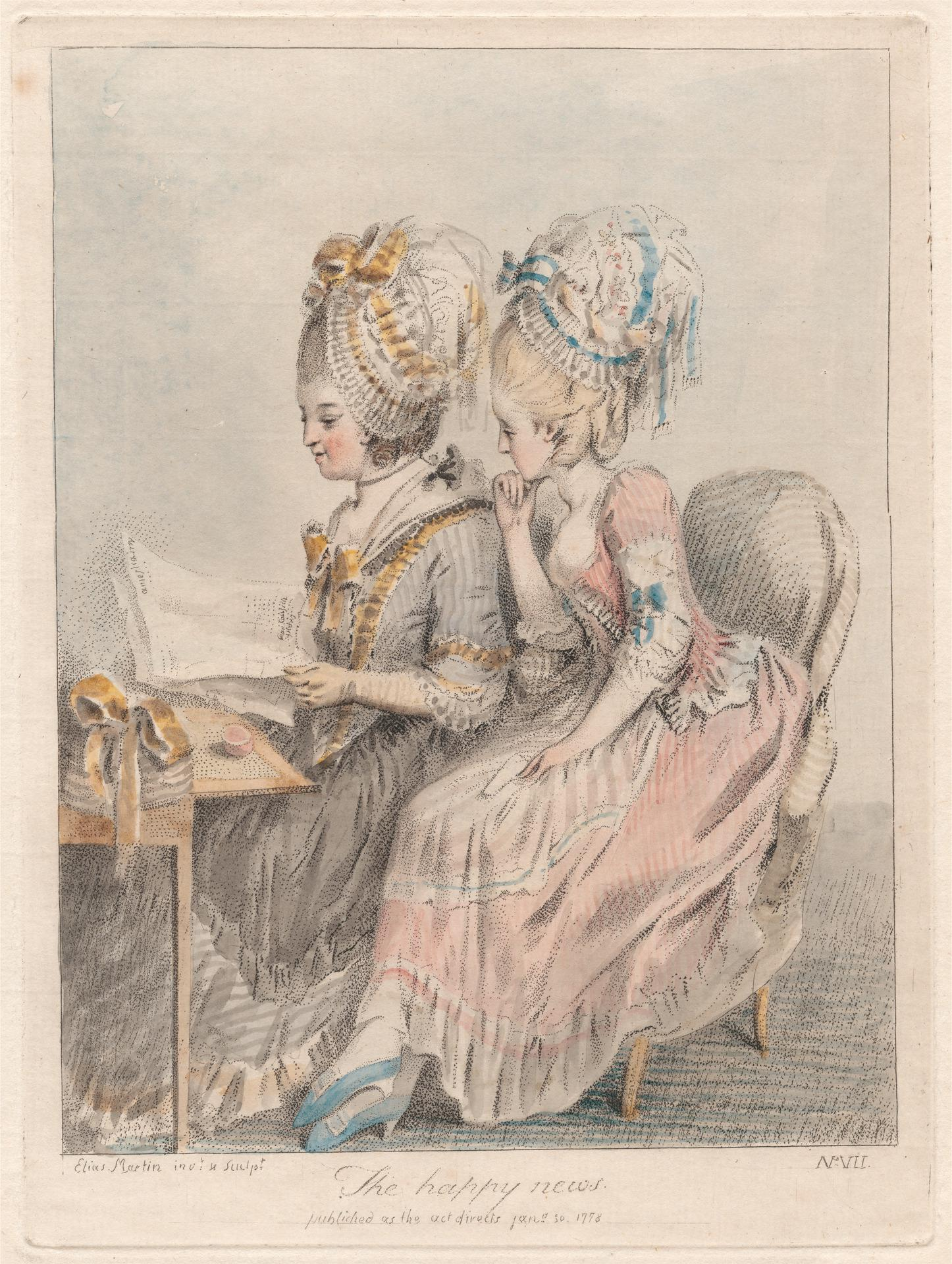
2 – 1778

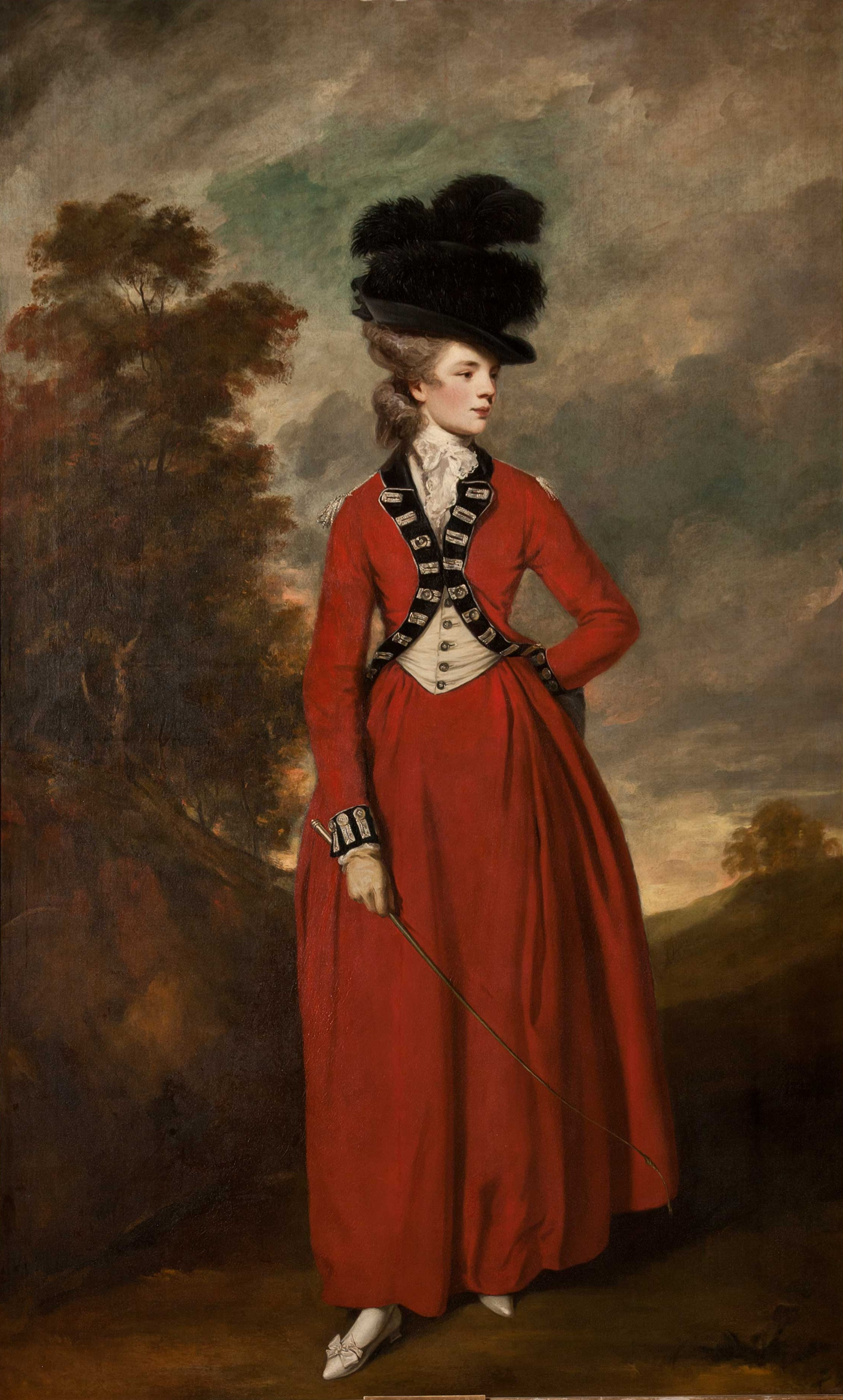
3 – 1779

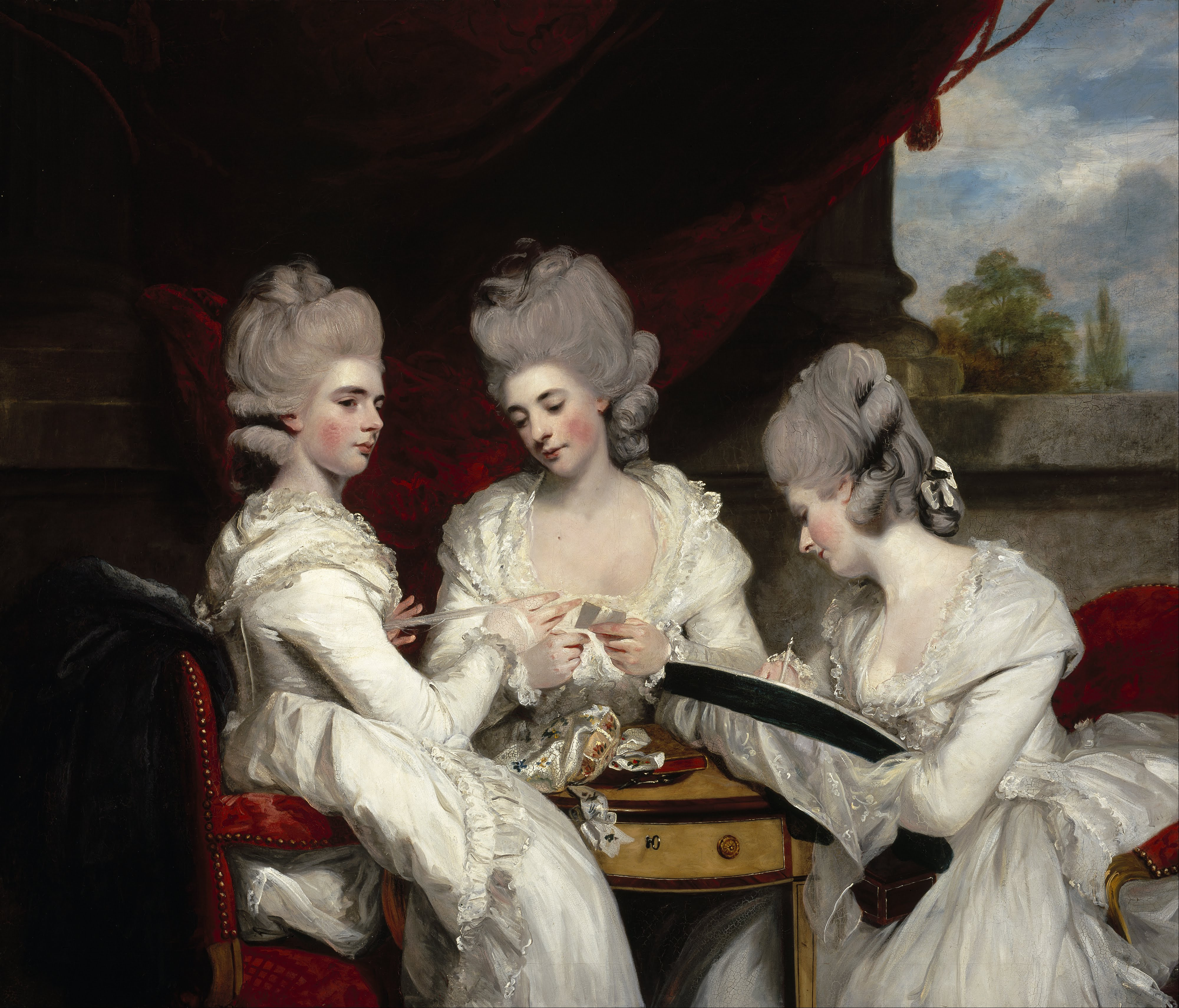
4 – 1780

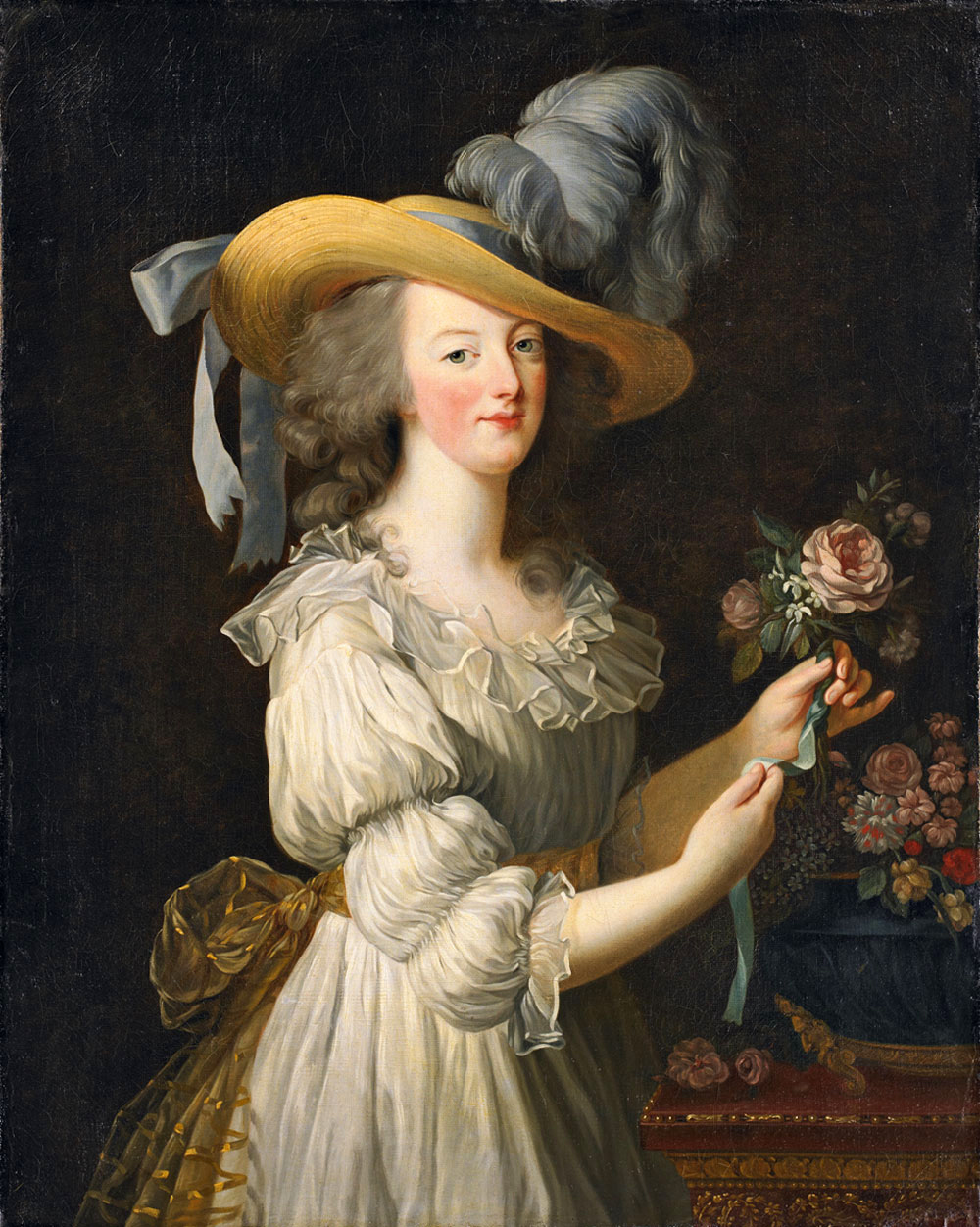
5 – 1783

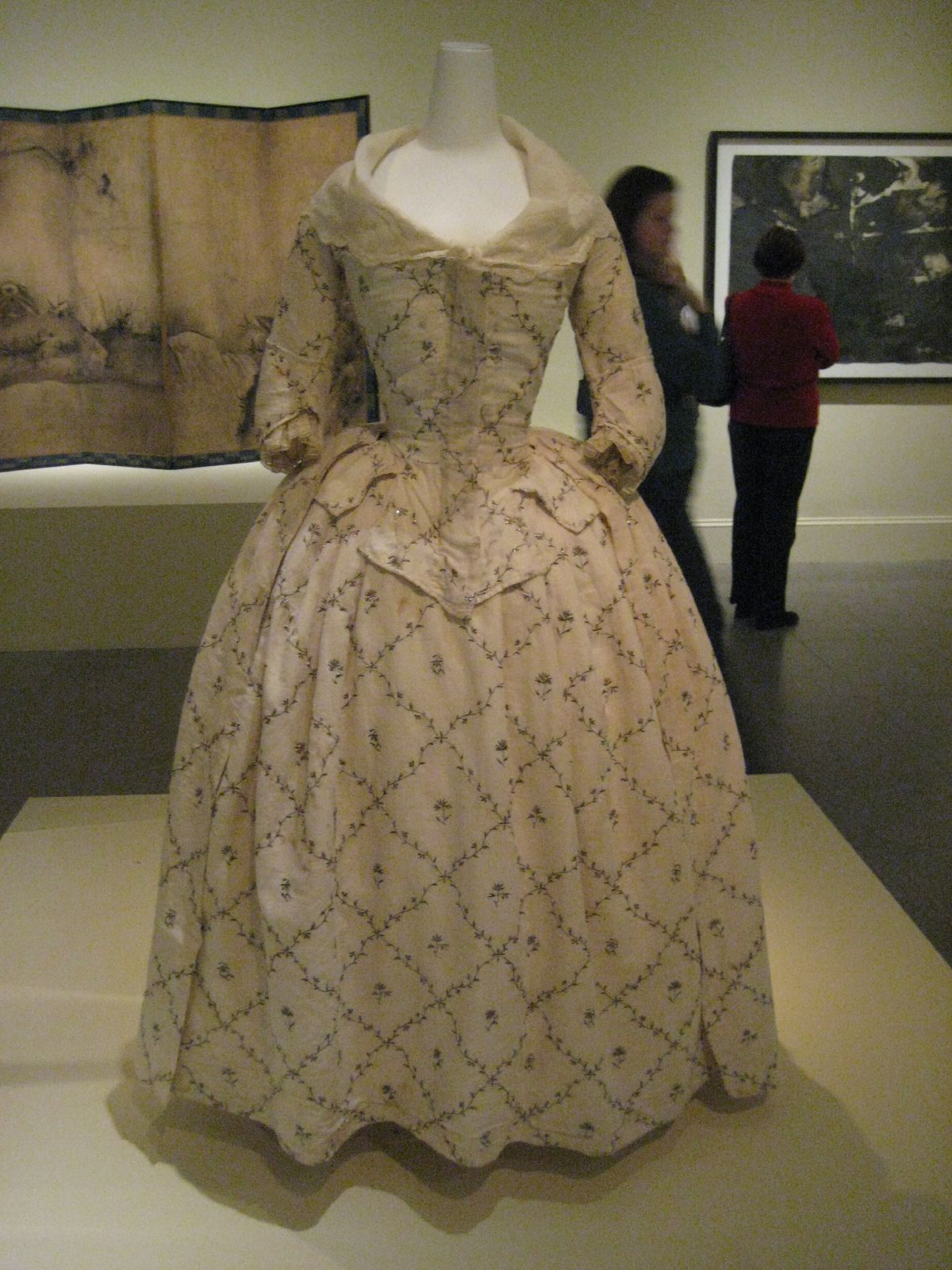
6 – 1784–87

8 – 1786

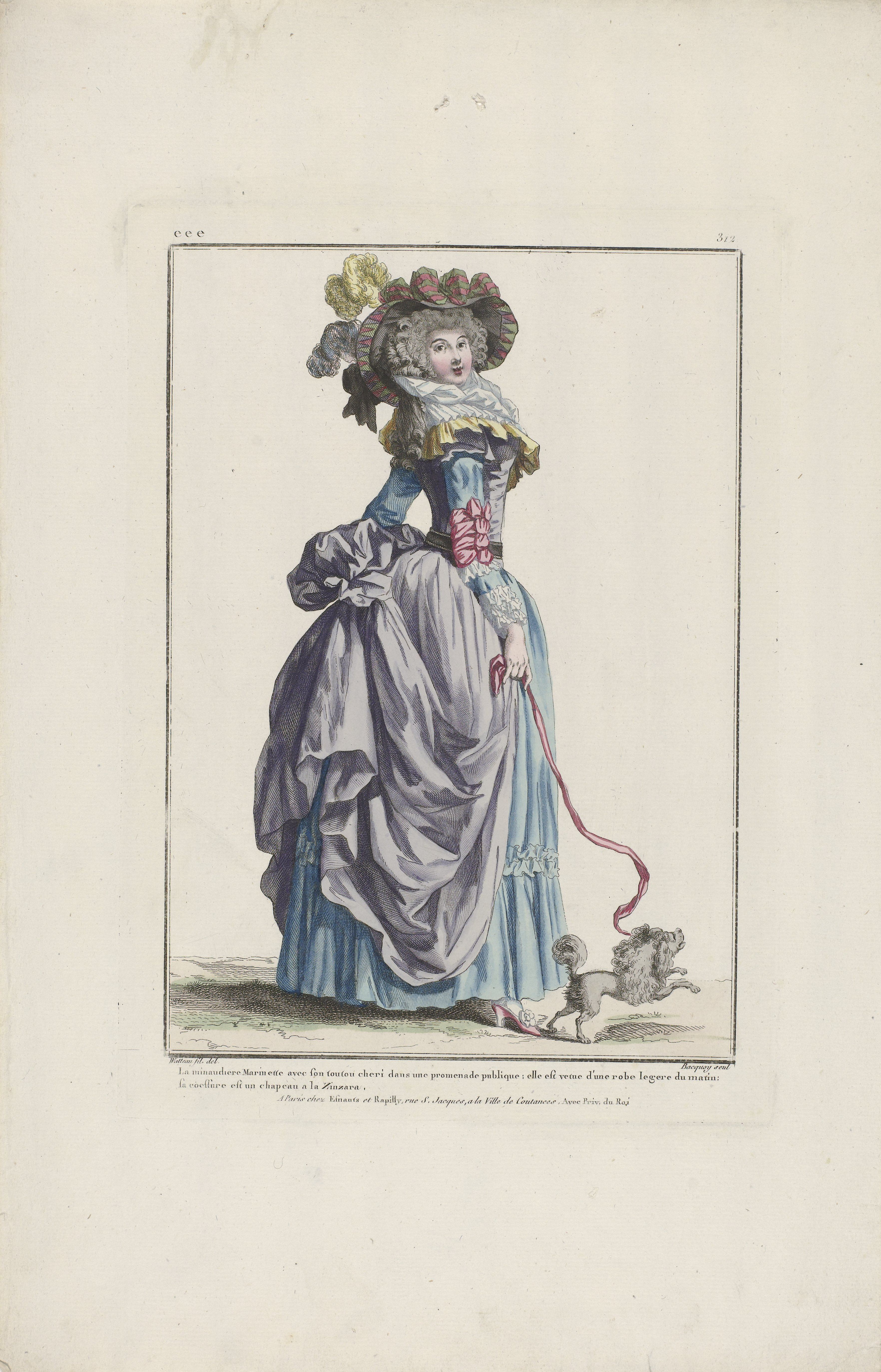
9 – 1786

10 – 1787

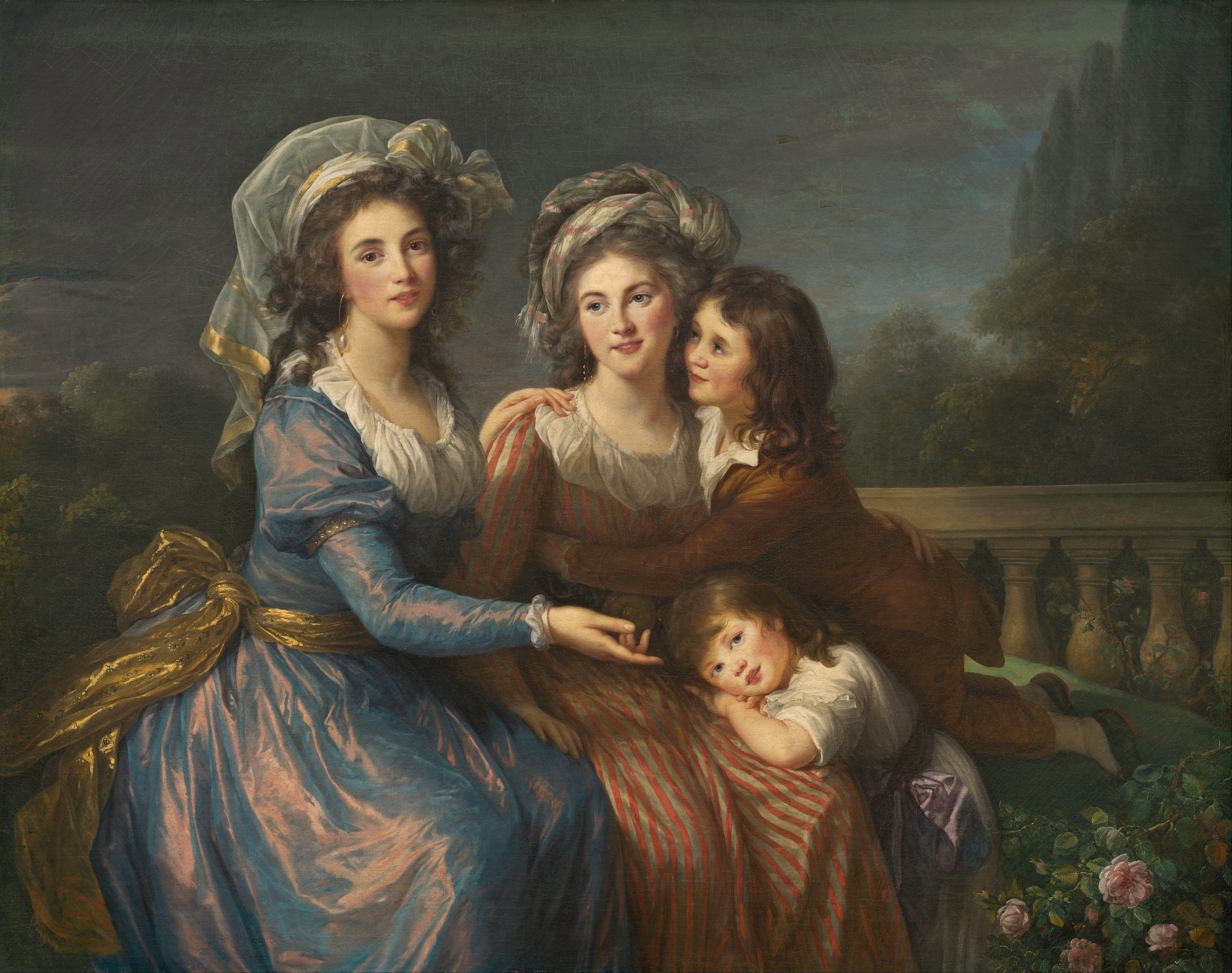
11 – 1787

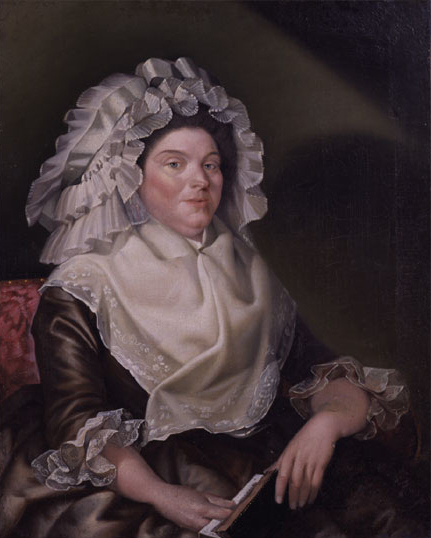
12 – 1789
1. Marie Antoinette wears panniers, a requirement of court fashion for the most formal state occasions, 1778
2. Two young ladies wear mob caps over high hair, 1778
3. Lady Worsley wears a red riding habit with military details, copying those of the uniform of her husband's regiment (he was away fighting the American rebels) on the cutaway coat and a buff waistcoat, 1779.
4. The Ladies Waldegrave wear transitional styles, 1780–81, in their portrait by Reynolds. Their hair is powdered and dressed high, but their white caracos, like shorter dresses à la polonaise, have long tight sleeves.
5. Marie Antoinette in chemise dress, 1783. She wears a sheer, striped sash and a broad-brimmed hat. Her sleeves are poufed, probably with drawstrings.
6. French robe à l'anglaise with fashionable closed bodice, 1784–87, Metropolitan Museum of Art, New York.
7. Fashion plate of 1786 shows a caraco and petticoat, worn with a wide-brimmed summer hat of straw with elaborate trimmings.
8. Gallerie des Modes et Costumes Français, 1786 morning dress worn with a fichu and a broad-brimmed hat.
9. Miss Constable, 1787, wears a chemise dress with plain sleeves and a narrow sash. She wears her hair down in a mass of curls under her straw hat.
10. The Marquise de Pezay and the Marquise de Rouge wear colorful dresses in the new style, one blue and one striped, with sashes and high-necked chemises beneath. The Marquise de Rougé wears a scarf or kerchief wrapped into a turban.
11. Elizabeth Sewall Salisbury wears an oversized mob cap trimmed with a wide satin ribbon and a kerchief pinned high at the neckline. America, 1789.

==== 1790–1795 ====
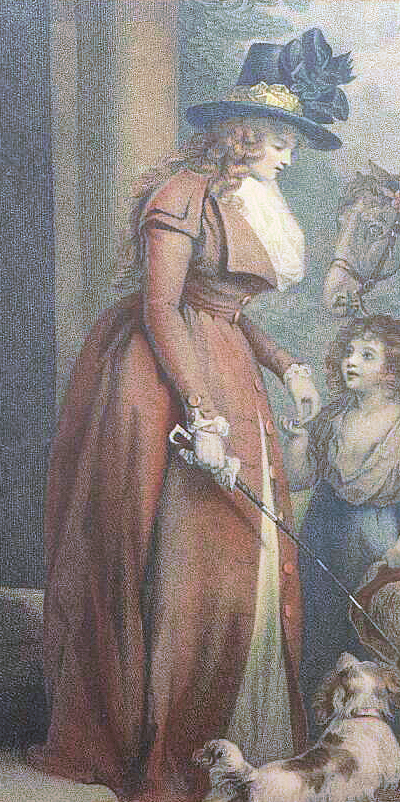
1 – 1790

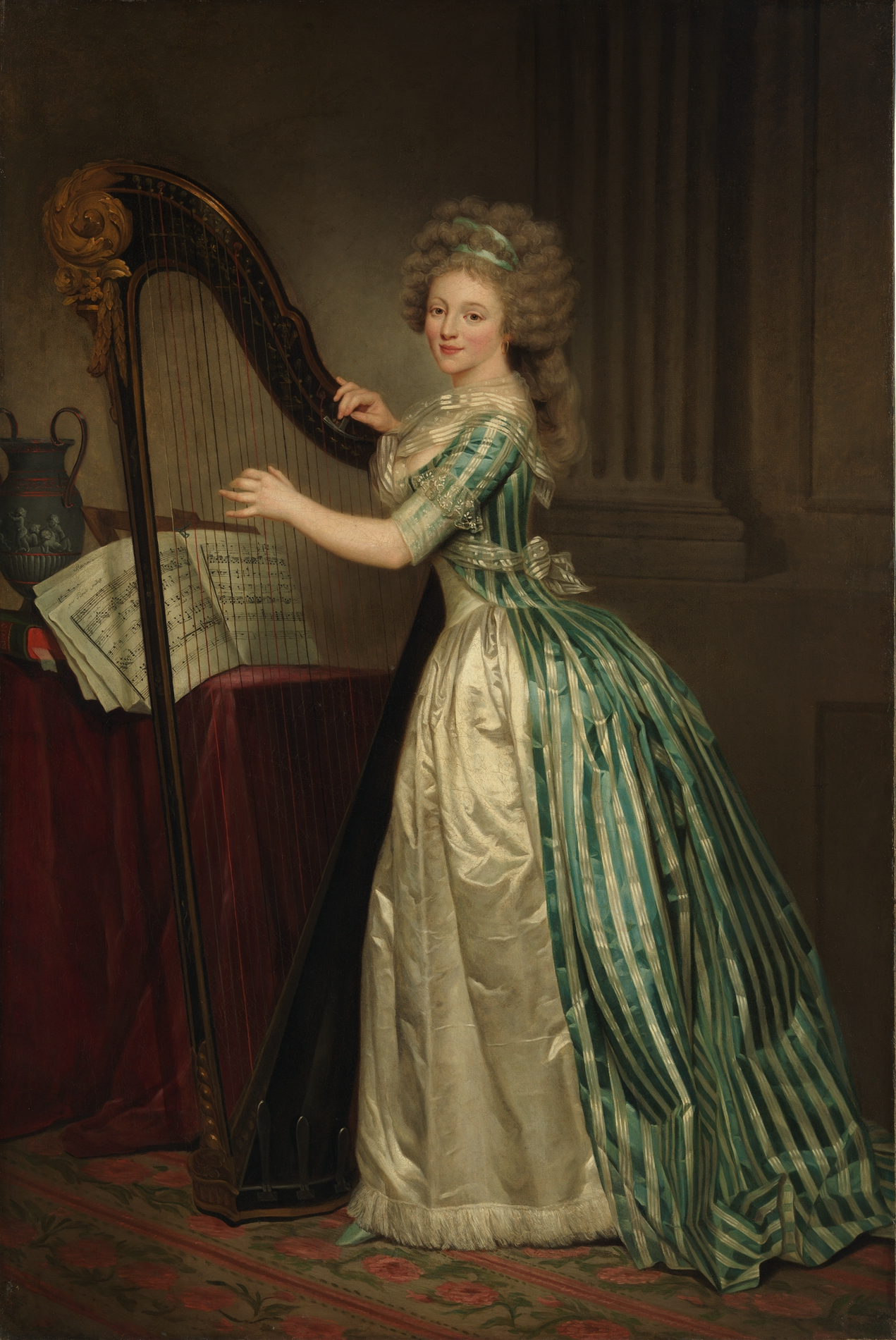
2 – c. 1791

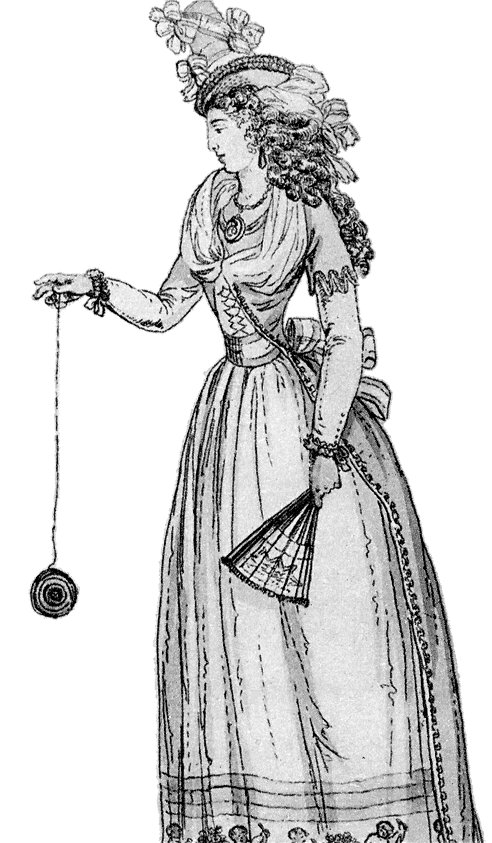
3 – 1791

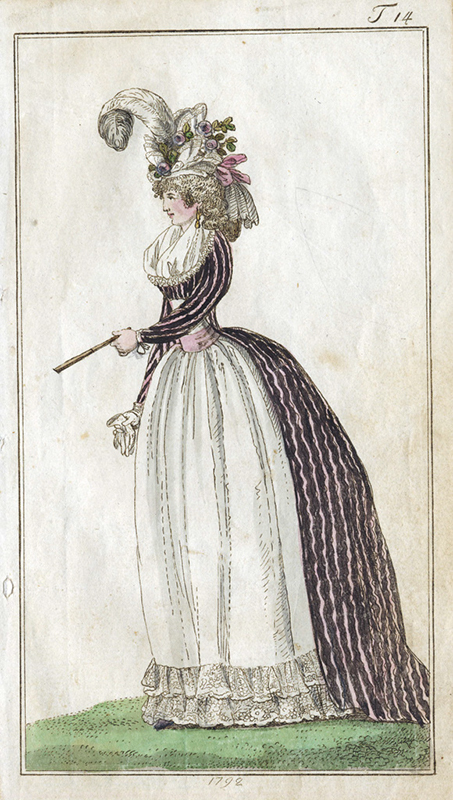
4 – 1792

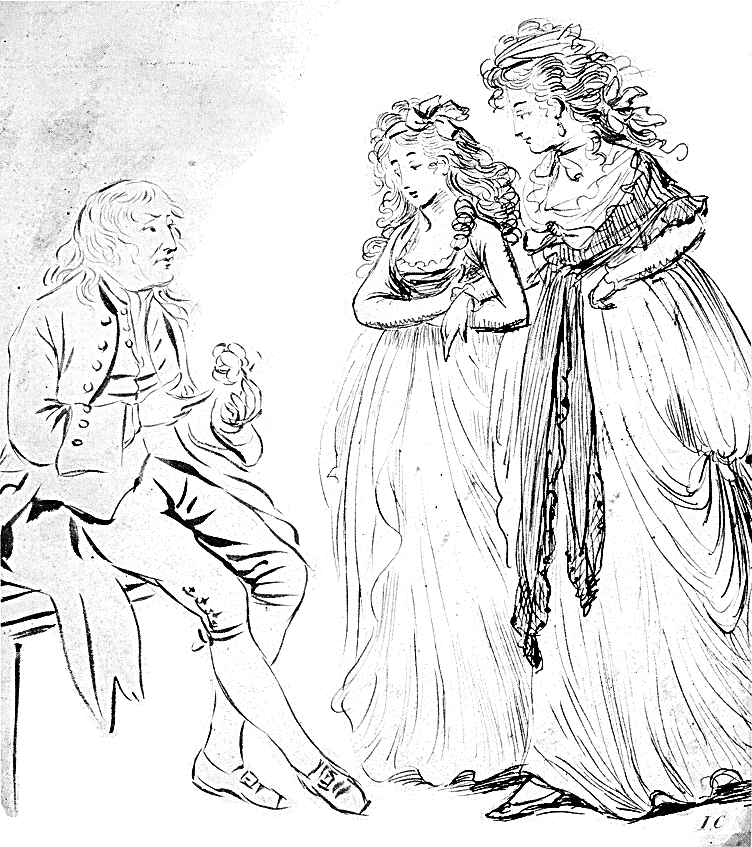
5 – 1790s

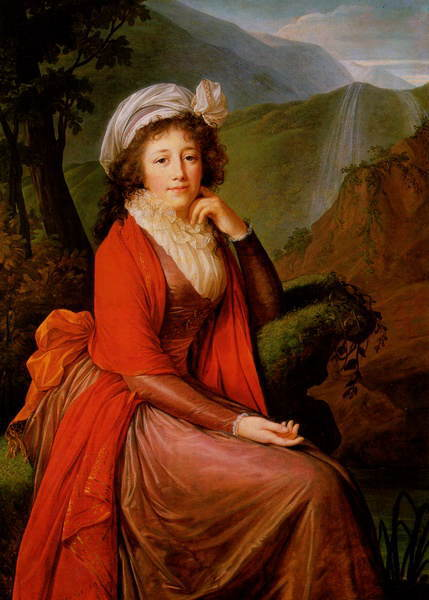
6 – 1793

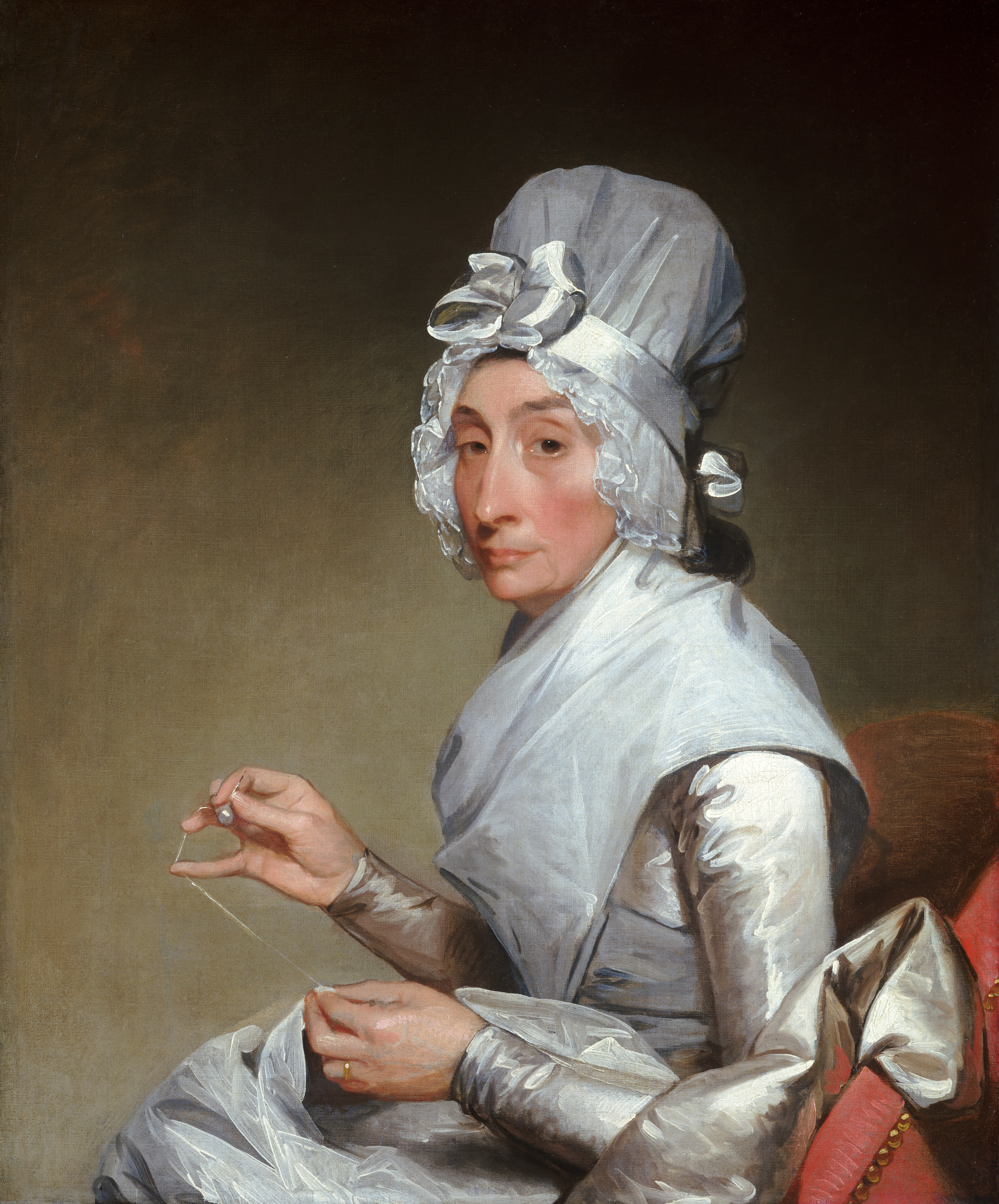
7 – 1793

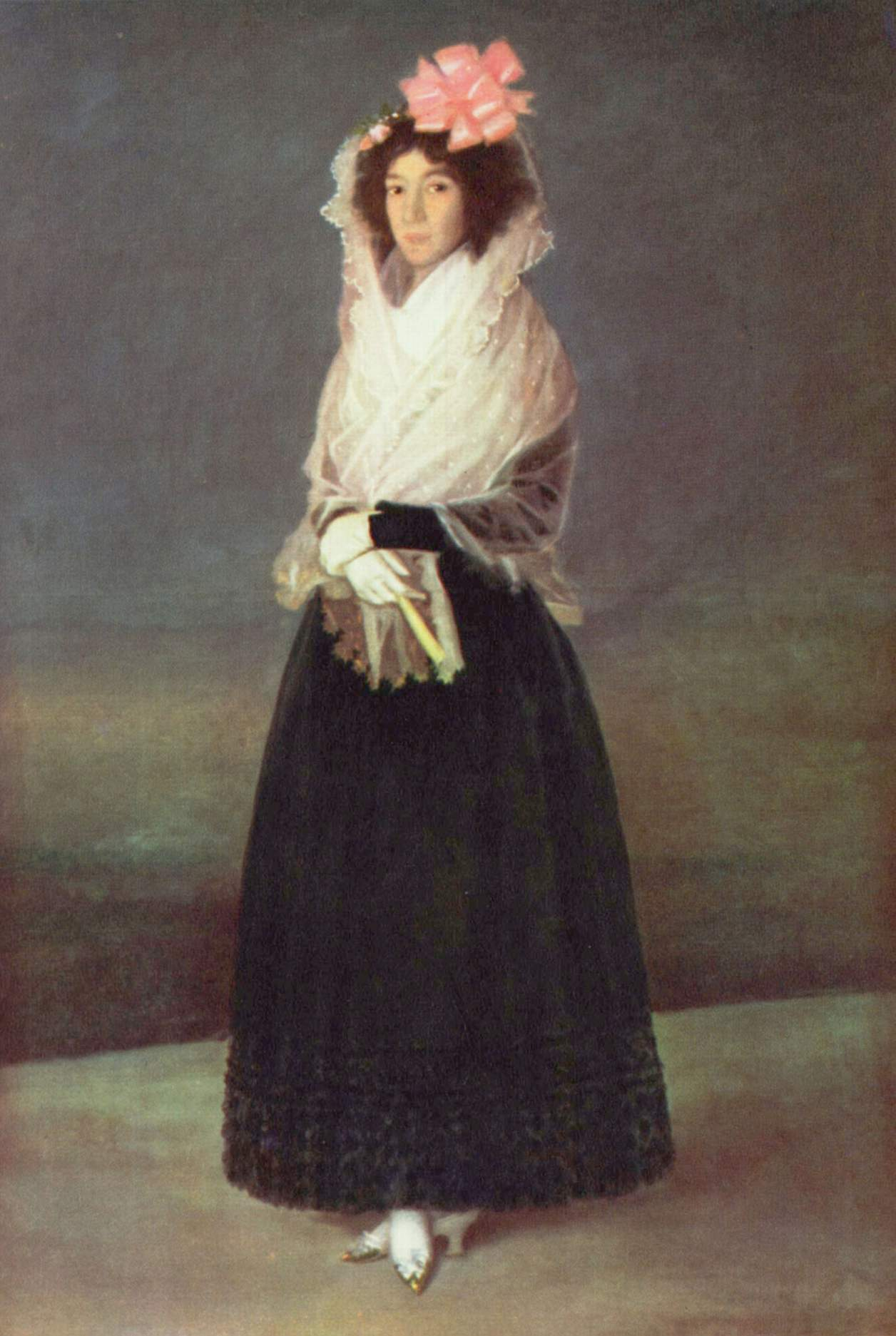
8 – 1794

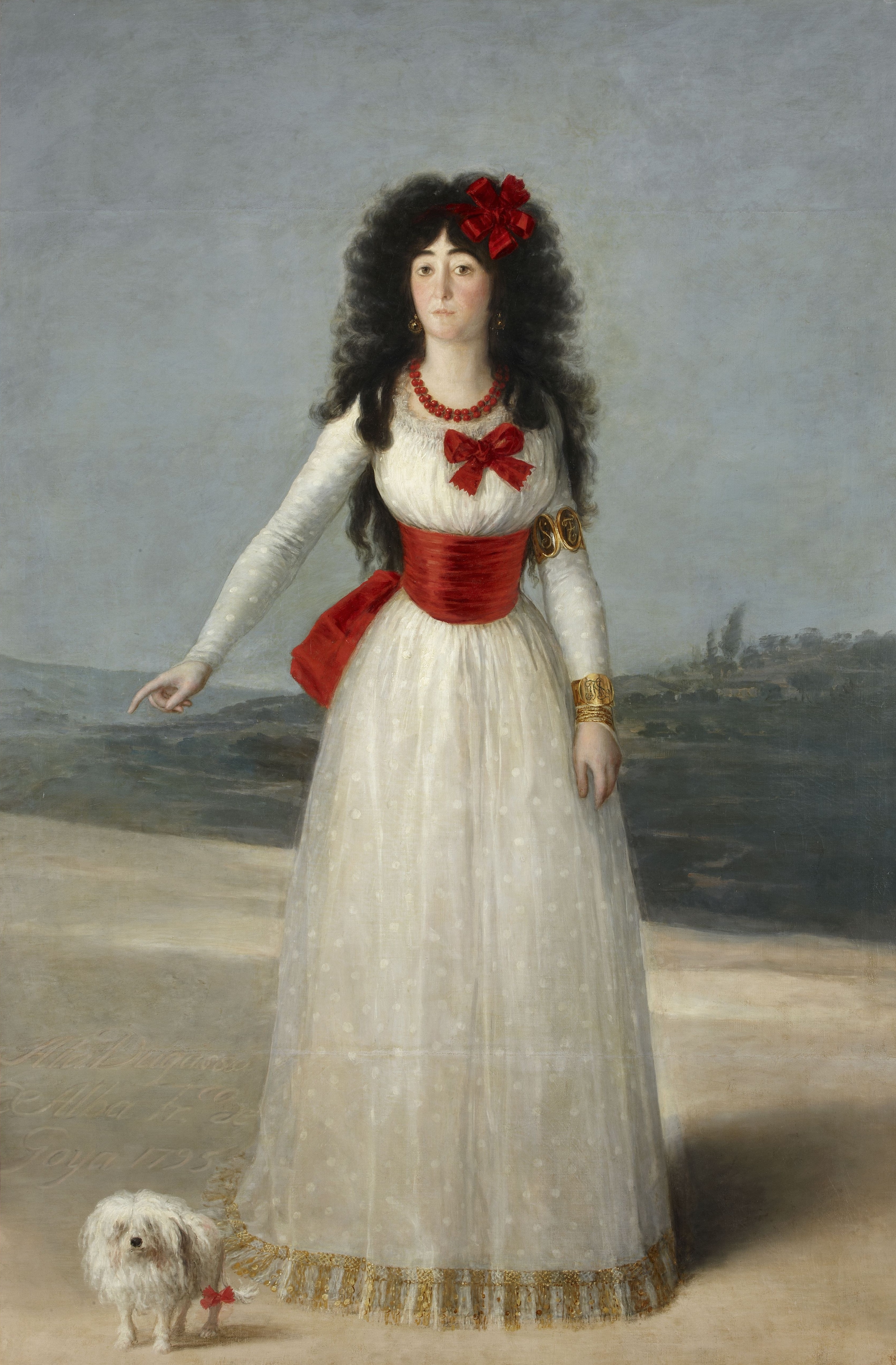
9 – 1795
1. Redingote or riding coat of c. 1790, with "pouter-pigeon" front. This lady wears a mannish top hat for riding and carries her riding crop.
2. Self-portrait of Rose Adélaïde Ducreux with harp.
3. 1791 illustration of woman playing with an early form of yo-yo (or "bandalore") shows slight bust draping, which in more extreme form became the "pouter pigeon" look.
4. Illustration of women's fashion from 1792
5. Sketch by Isaac Cruikshank (father of George), showing both male and female middle-class English styles of the early 1790s.
6. La Comtesse Bucquoi wears a sashed gown with a high-necked, frilled chemise beneath, a turban on her head, and a newly fashionable scarlet shawl. 1793.
7. Mrs. Richard Yates, 1793, wears a very conservative gown with a kerchief and a gathered mob cap with a large ribbon bow.
8. María Rita de Barrenechea y Morante, Marchioness of la Solana
9. The Duchess of Alba wears a simple white gown, with a red sash and bow on her low collar. She wears her hair loose and free. This portrait shows the influence of French fashion in Spain at the end of the 18th century, 1795.

===== Caricature =====
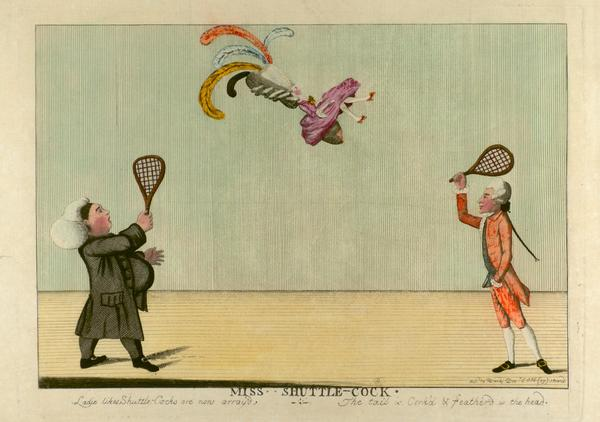
Miss Shuttle-Cock (1776) compares women's dresses and feathered headwear to the shuttlecocks used in the sport of Badminton.

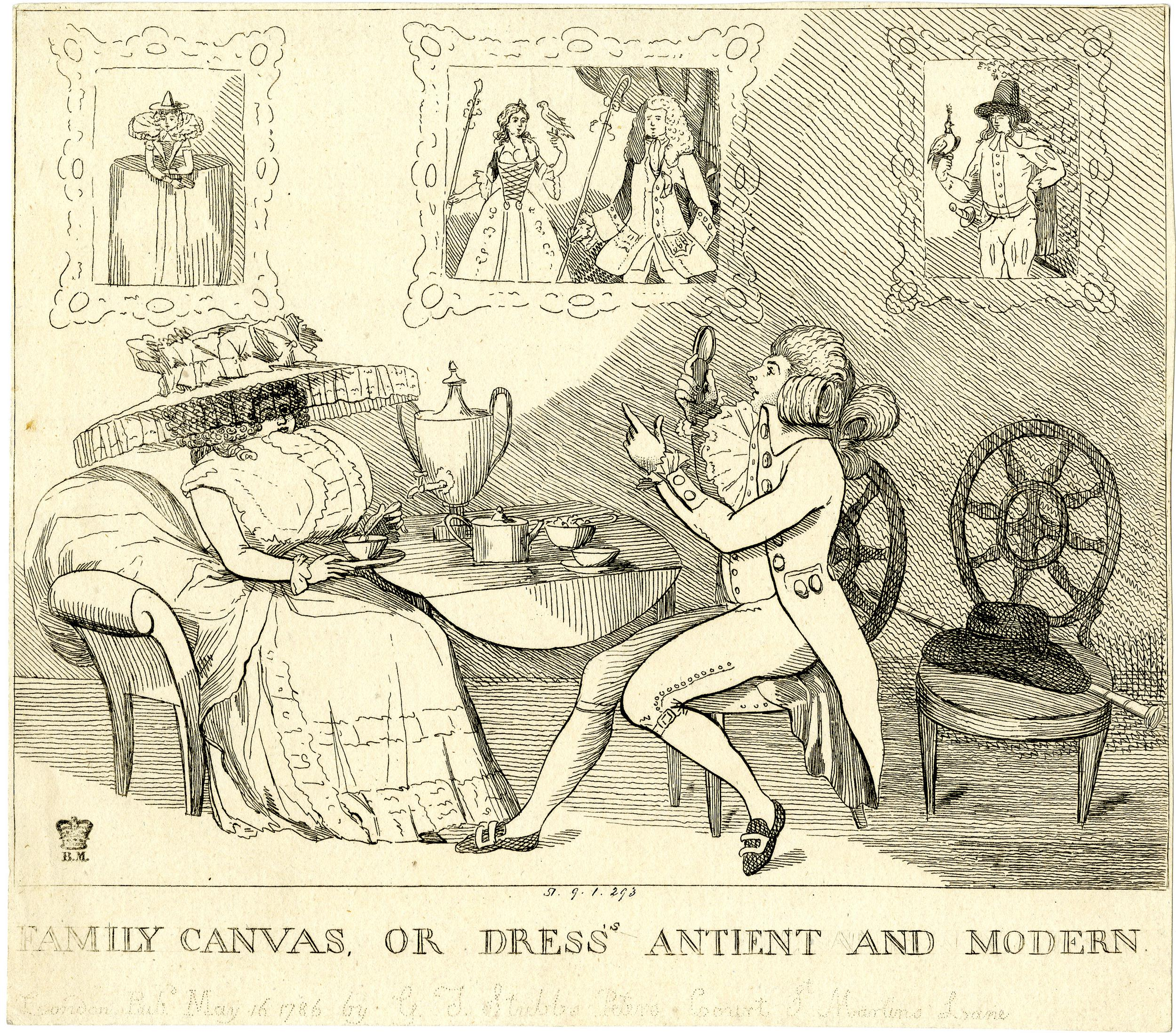
Modern dress (1786) illustrates the 1780s emphasis on rounded pouting bosoms and broad-brimmed hats.

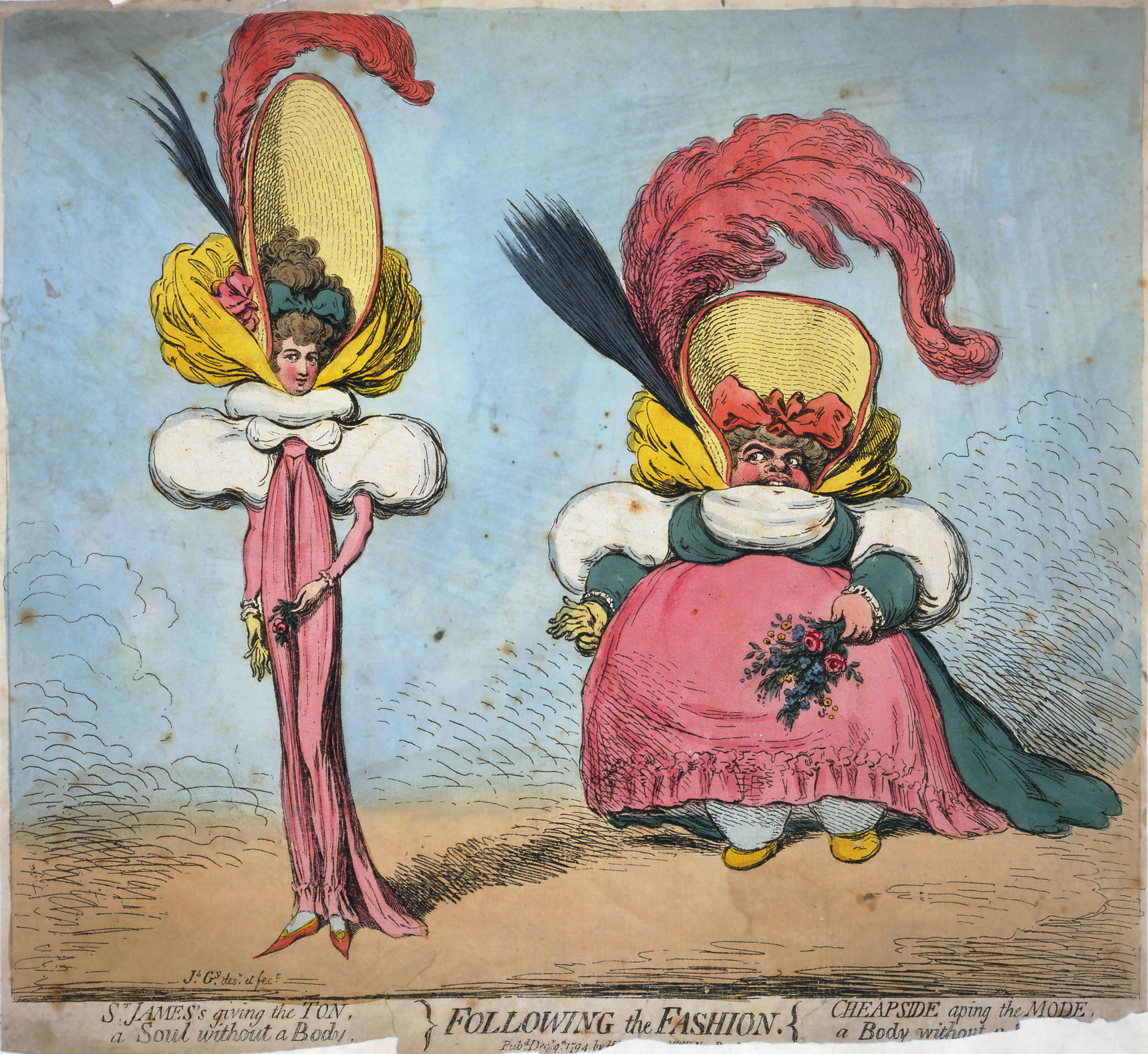
In Following the Fashion (1794), James Gillray caricatured figures flattered and not flattered by the high-waisted gowns then in fashion.

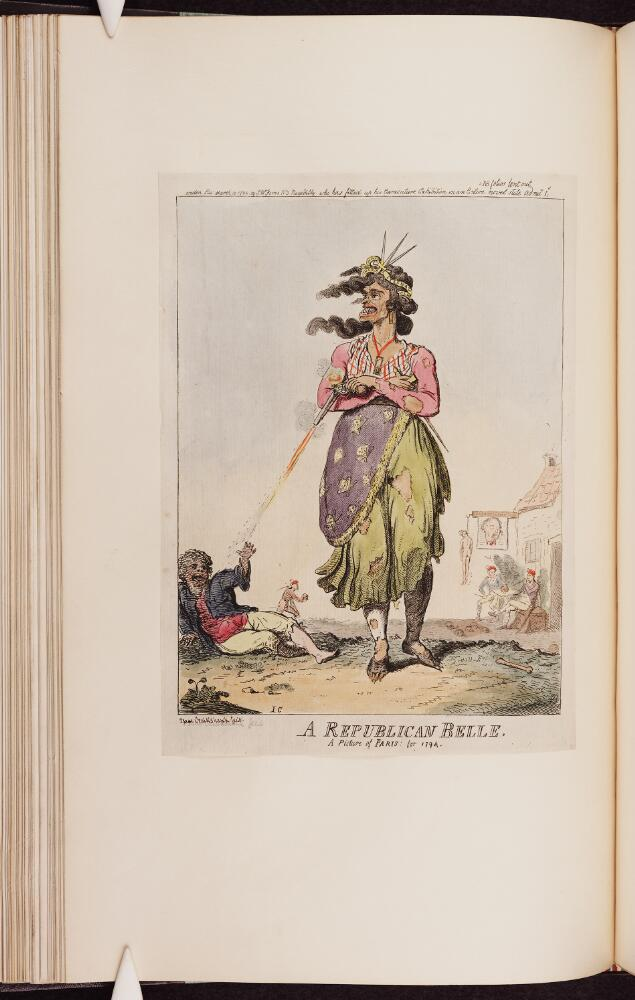
Isaac Cruikshank's caricature of a female French revolutionary, emphasizing colorful, mismatched clothes (1794).

=== French fashion ===
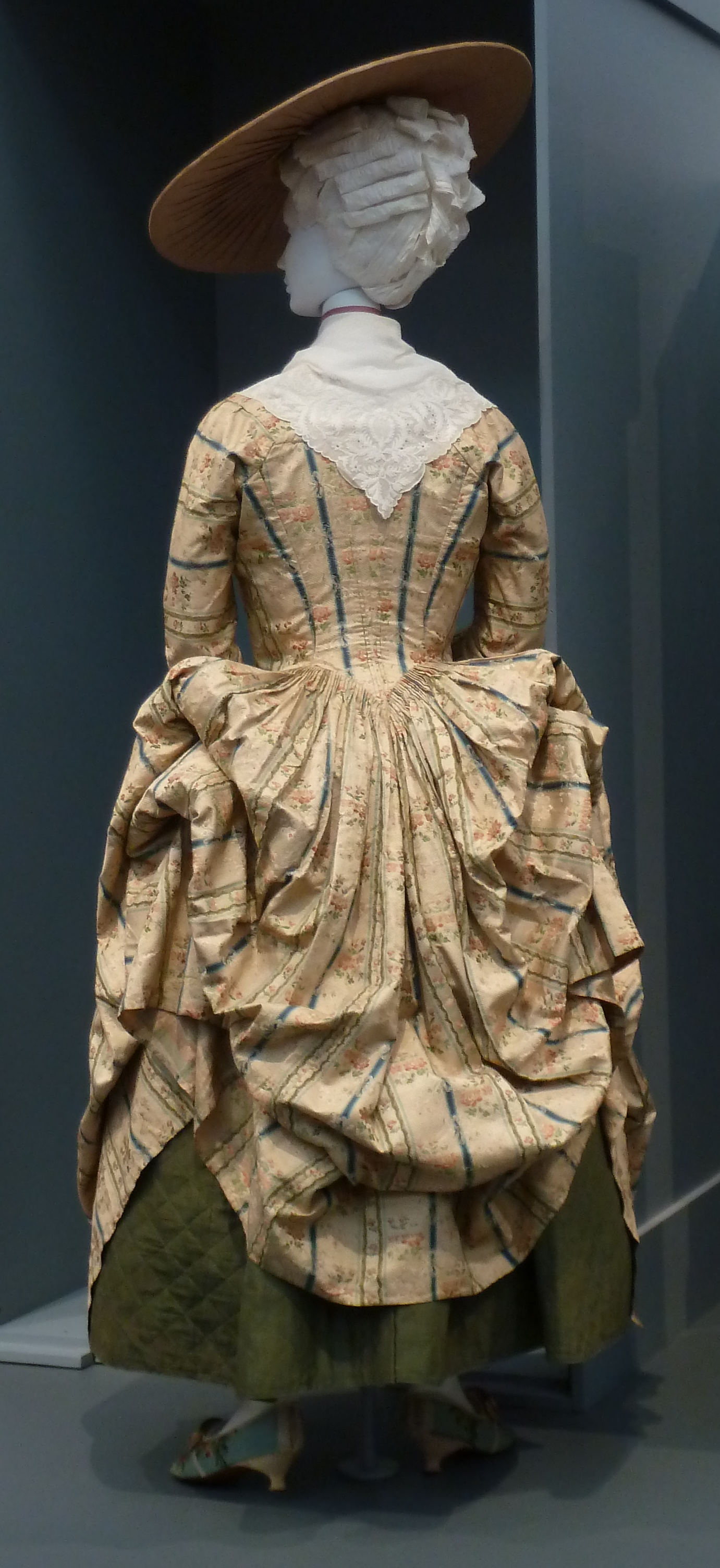
Dress, c. 1775 with fitted back of the robe à l'anglaise and skirt draped à la polonaise. LACMA

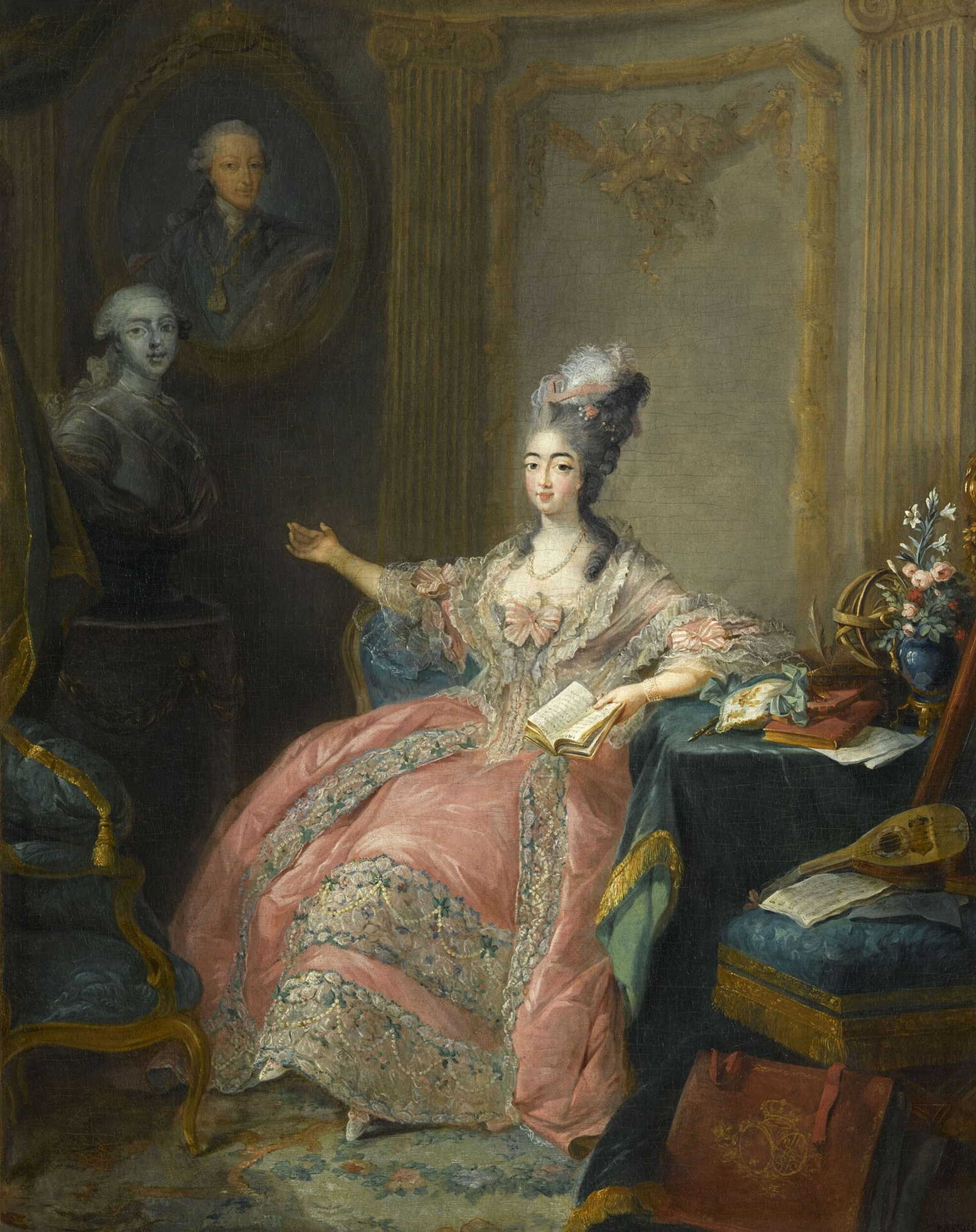
France, 1777

France, 1781

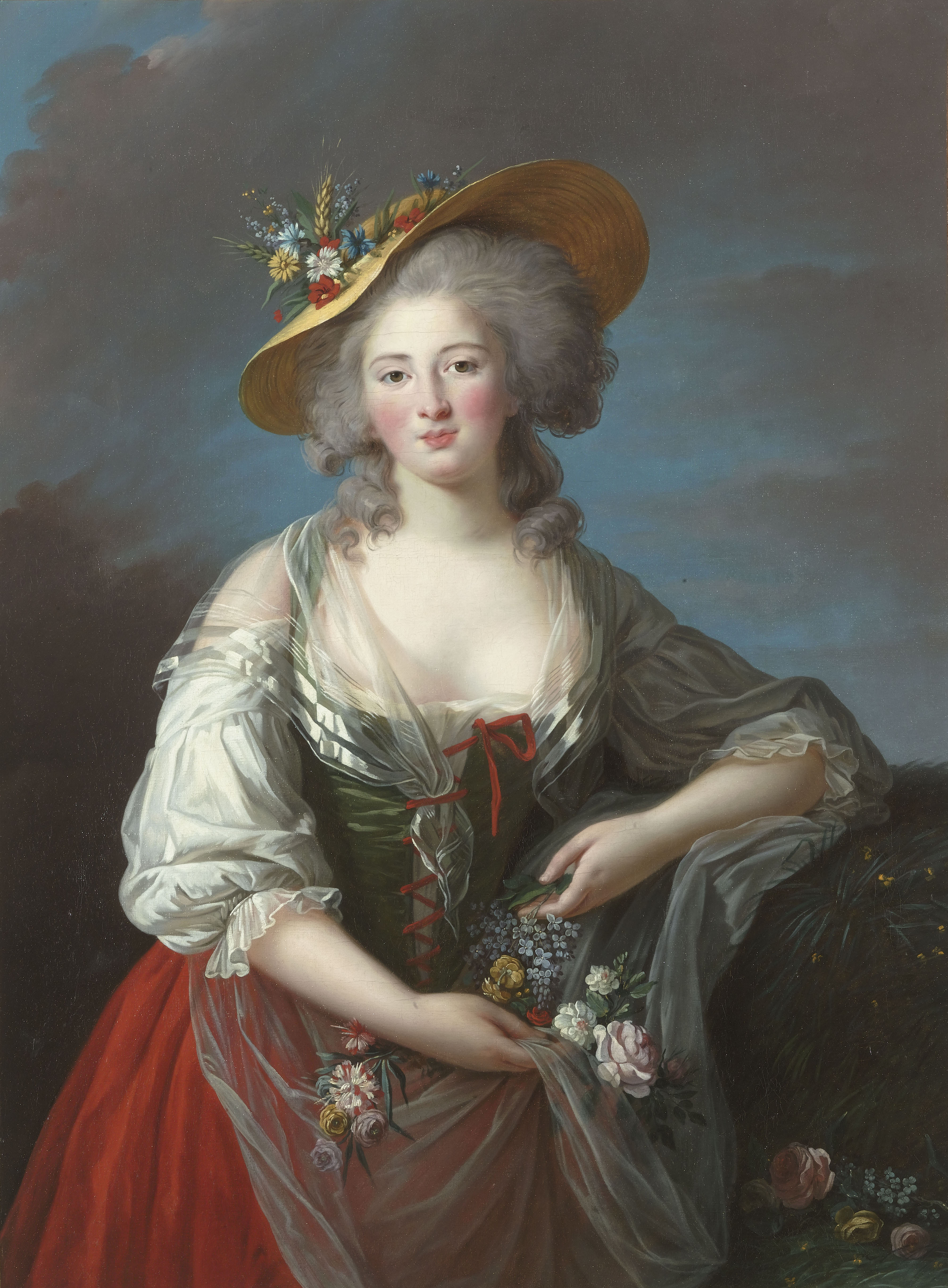
France, 1782

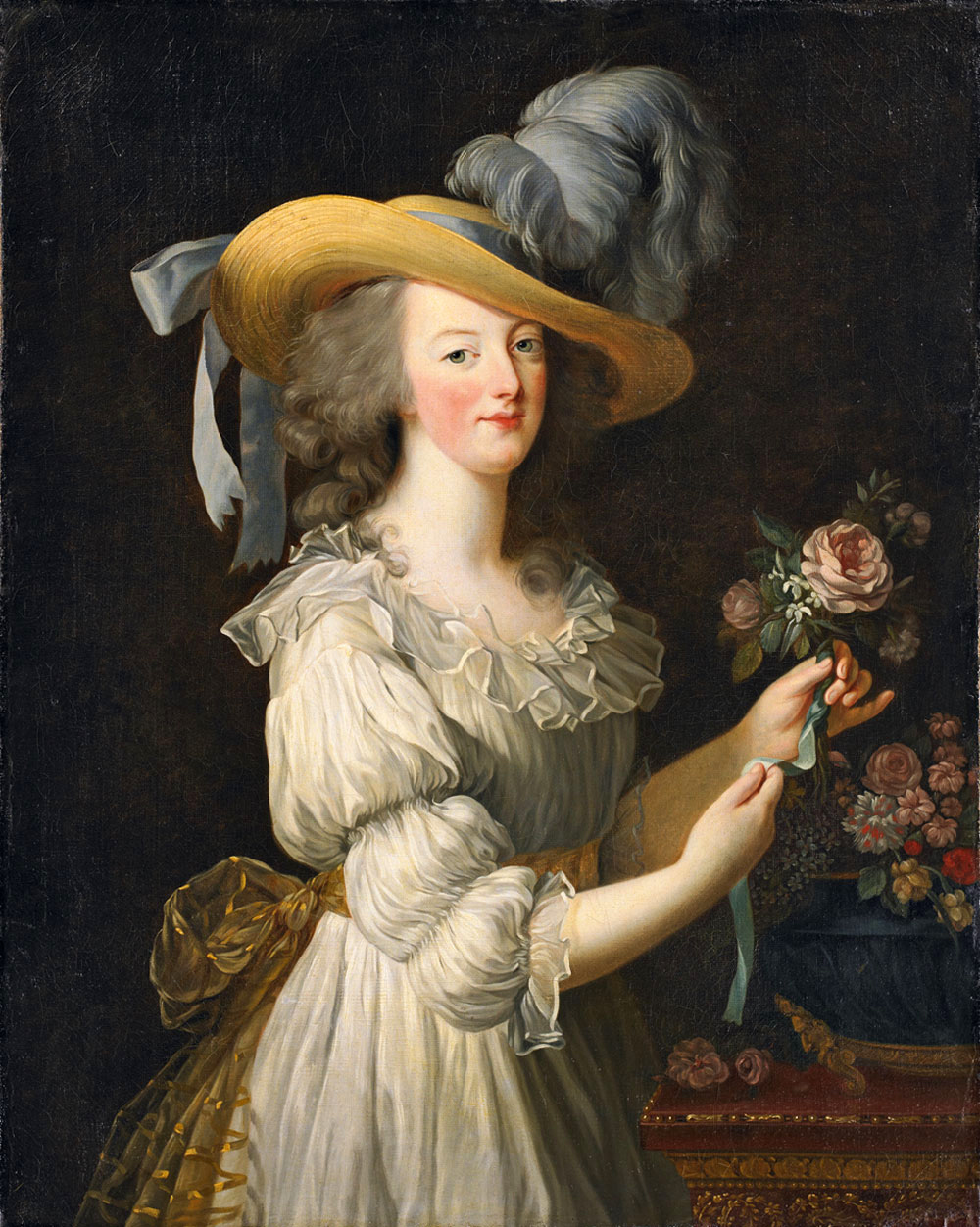
France, 1783

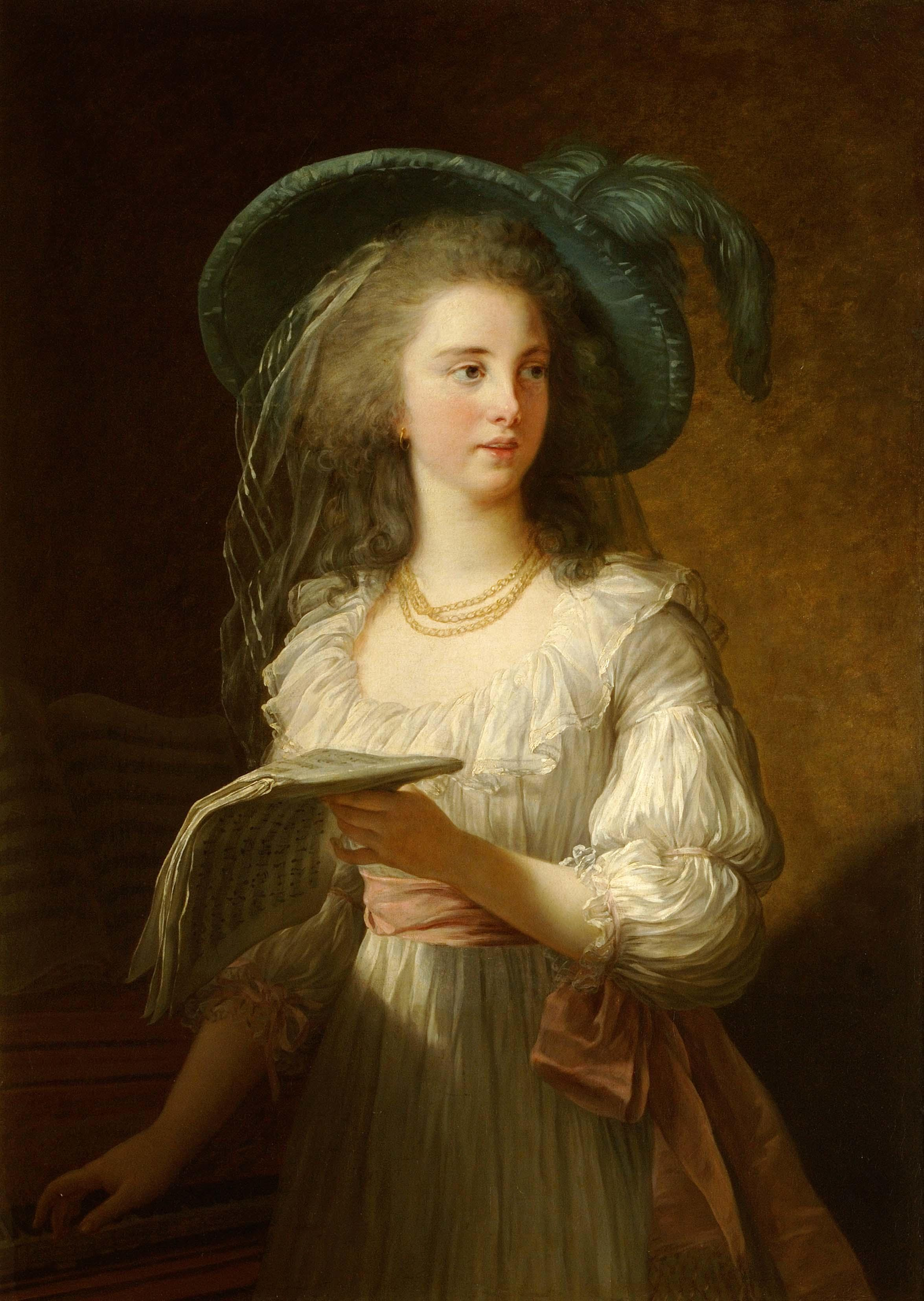
France, 1783

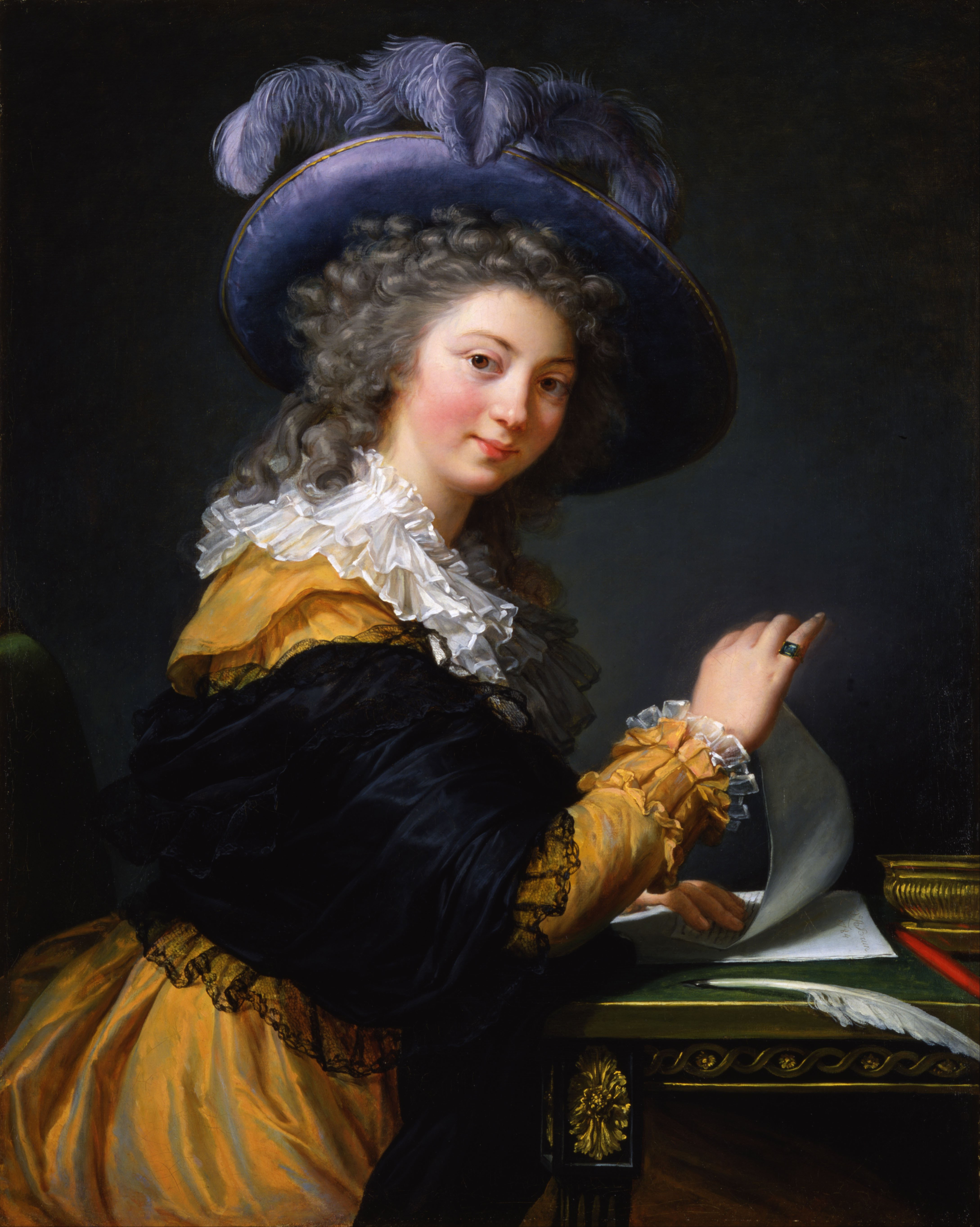
France, 1784

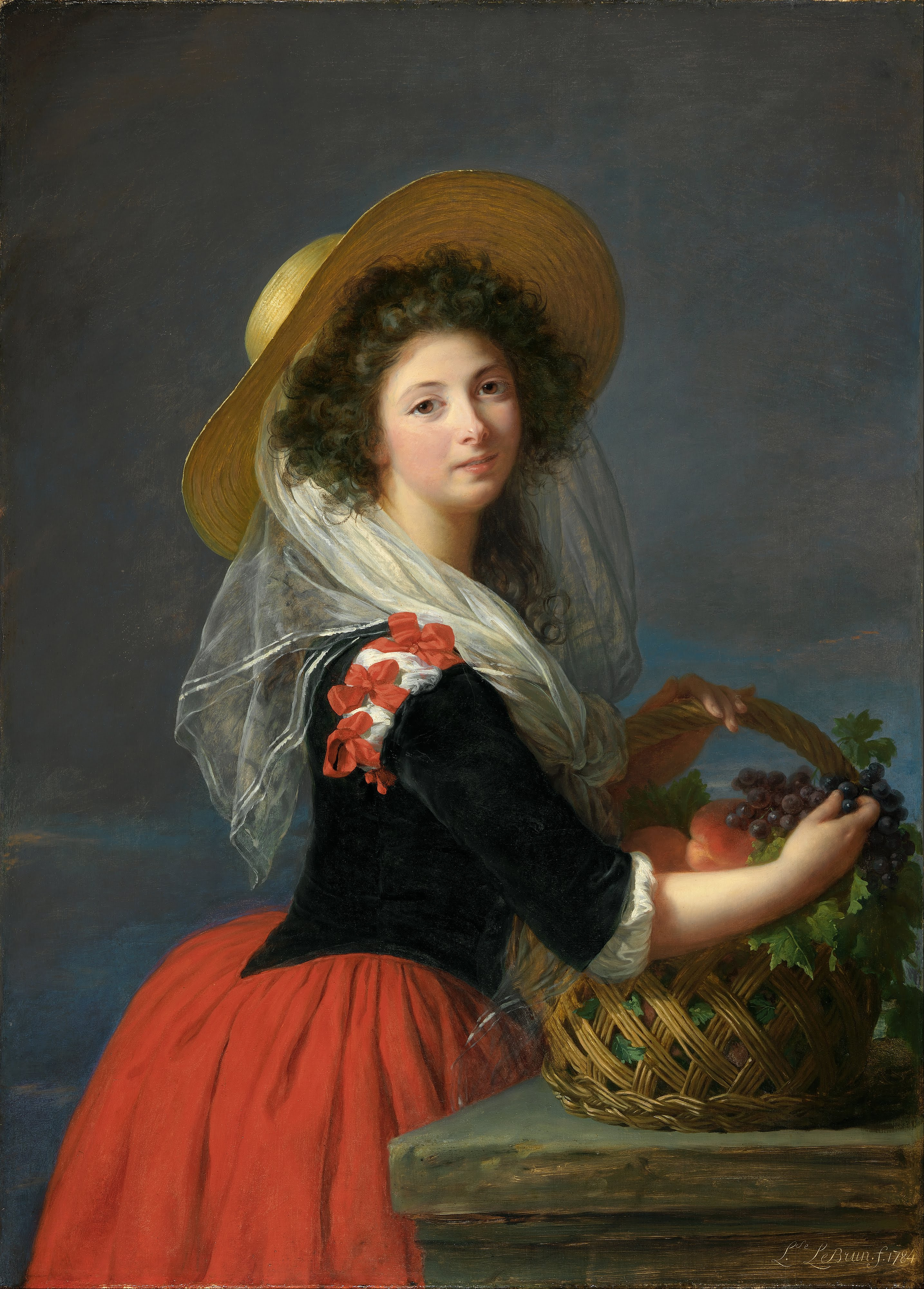
France, 1784

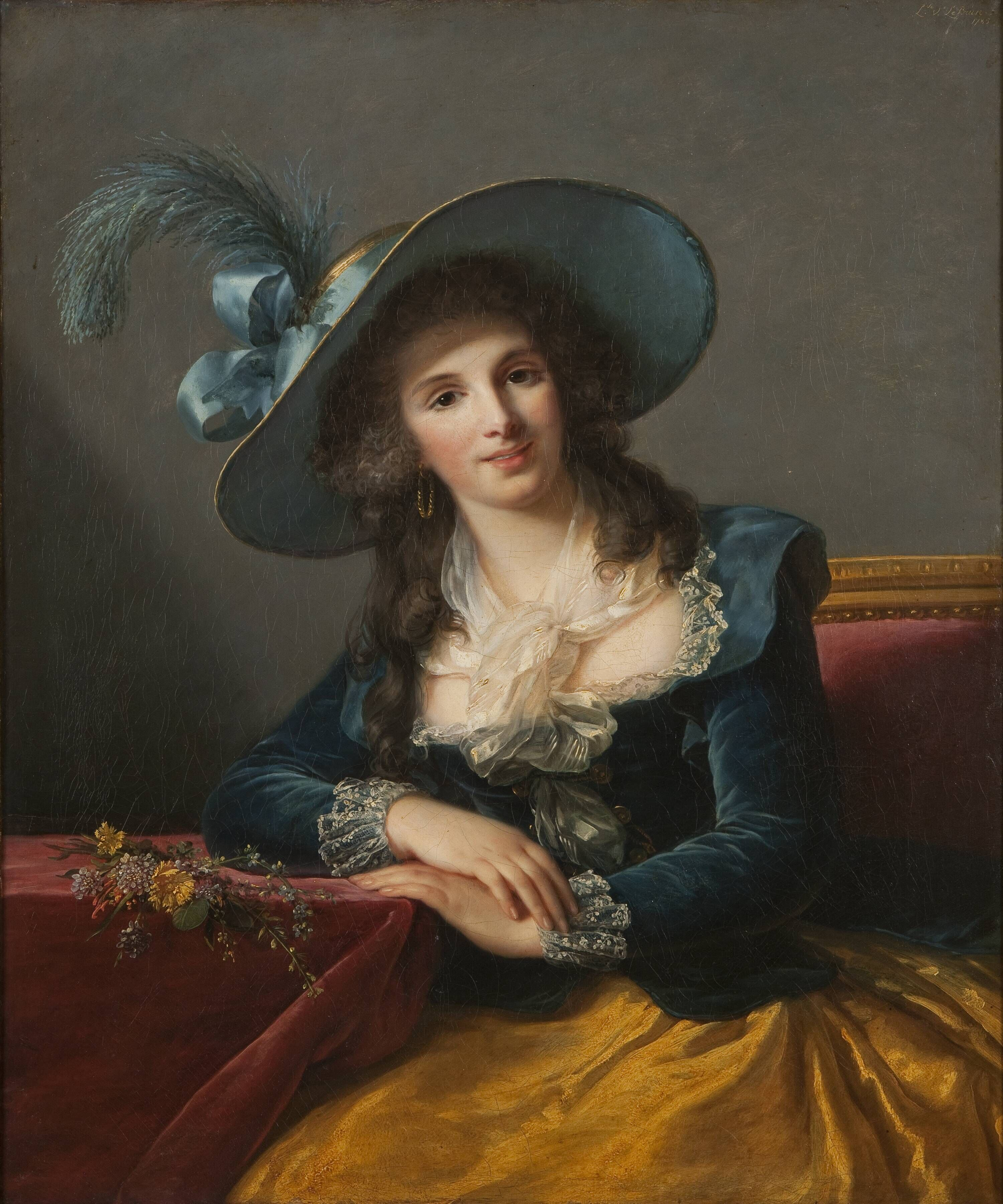
France, 1785

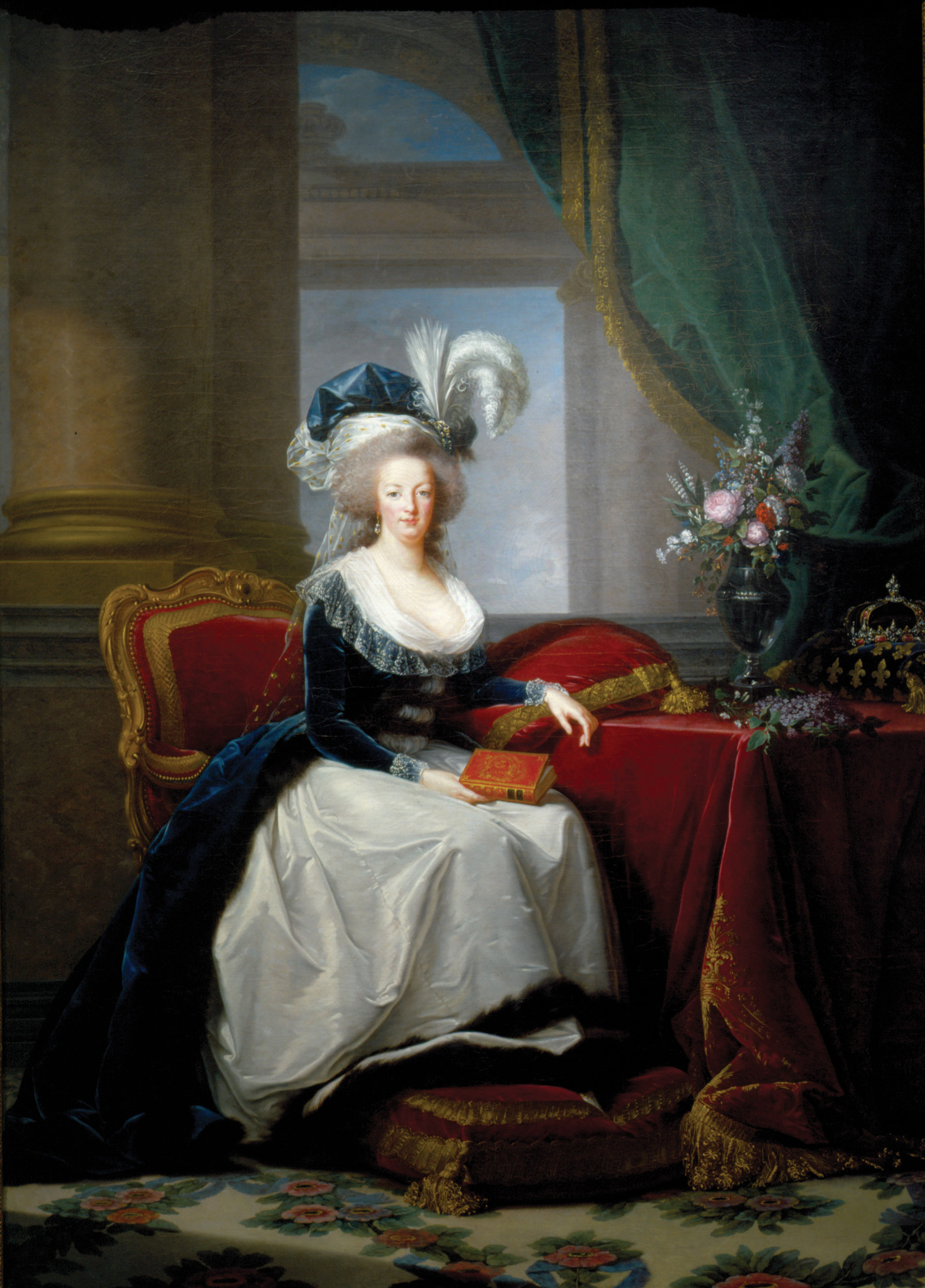
France, 1788

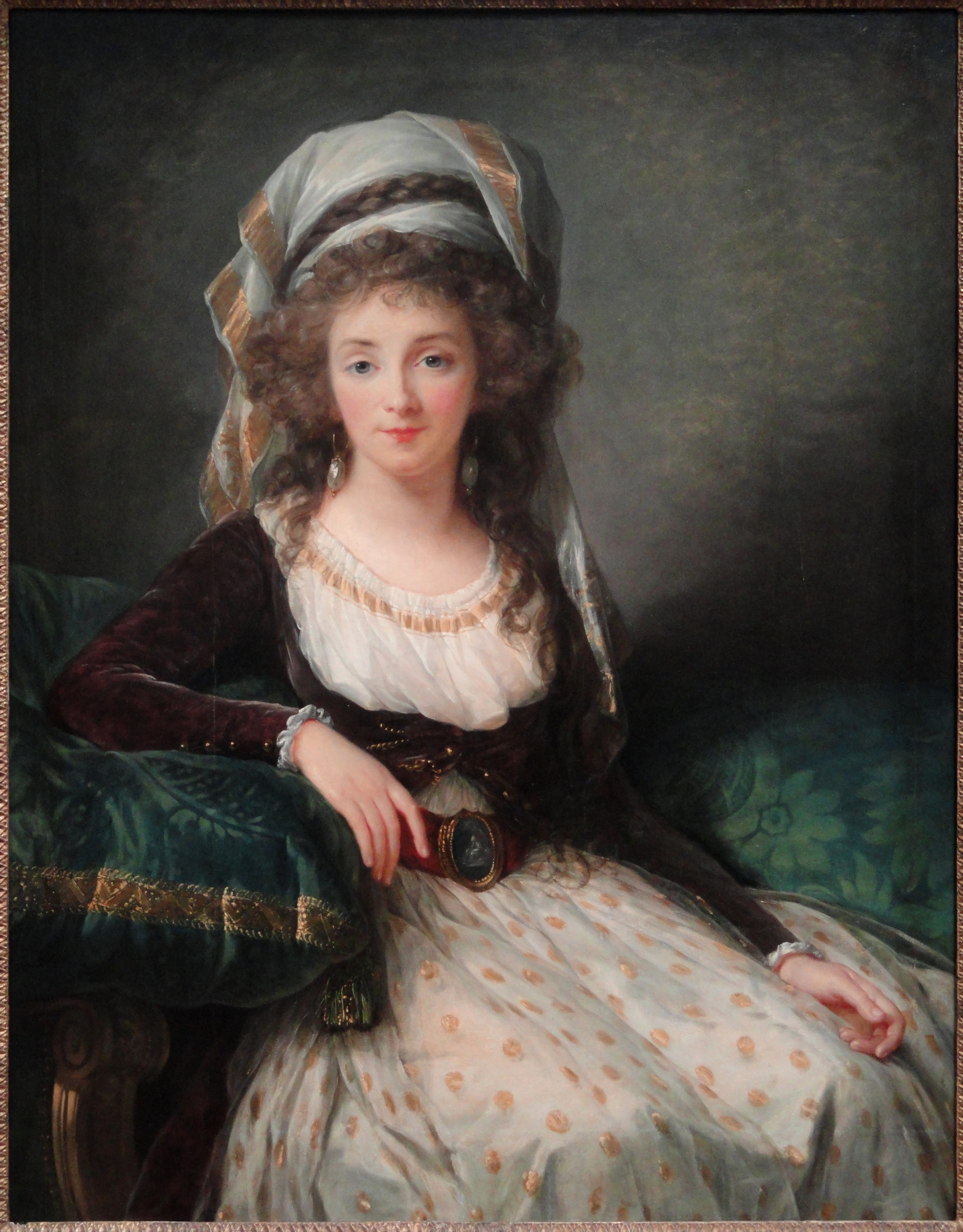
France, 1789

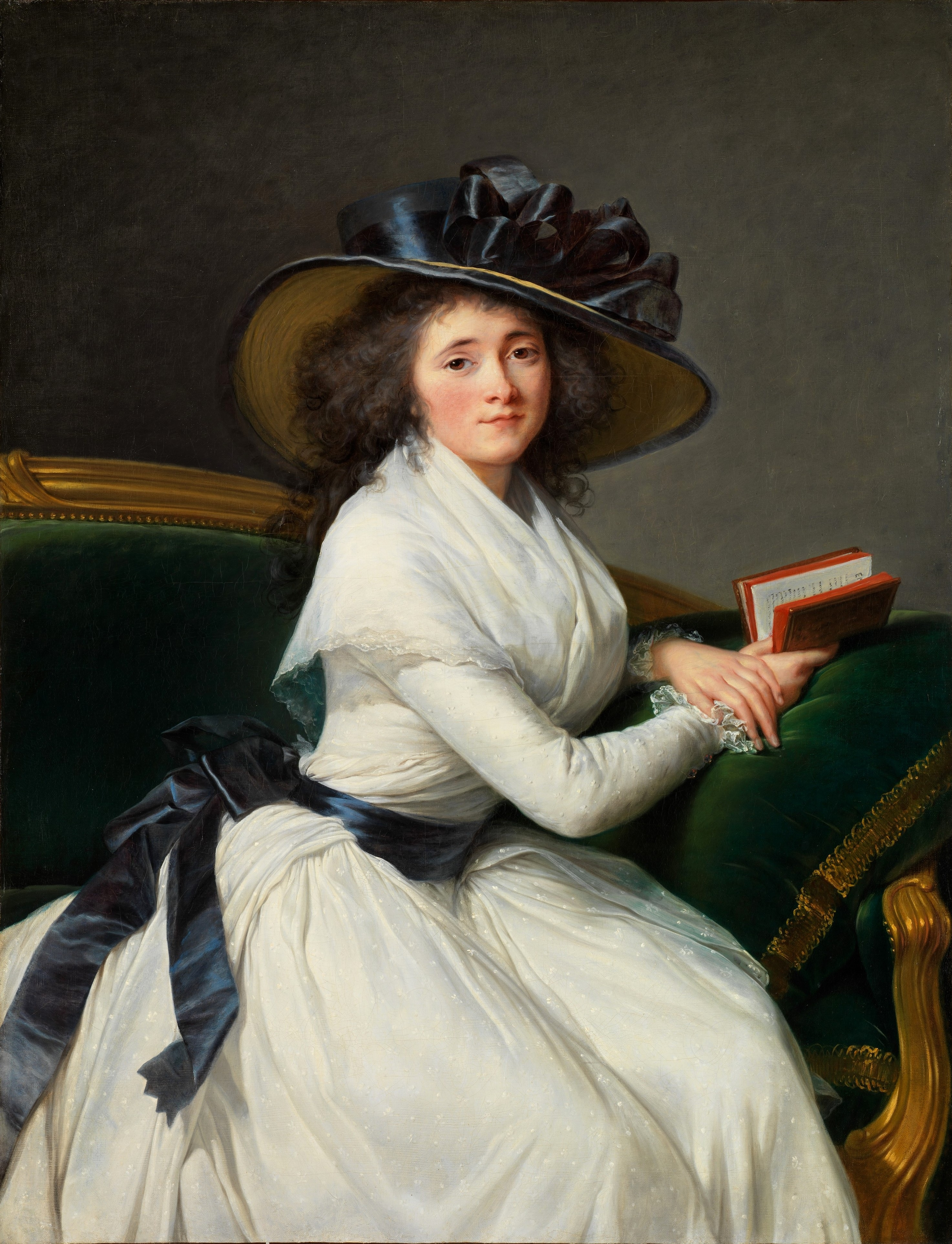
France, 1789

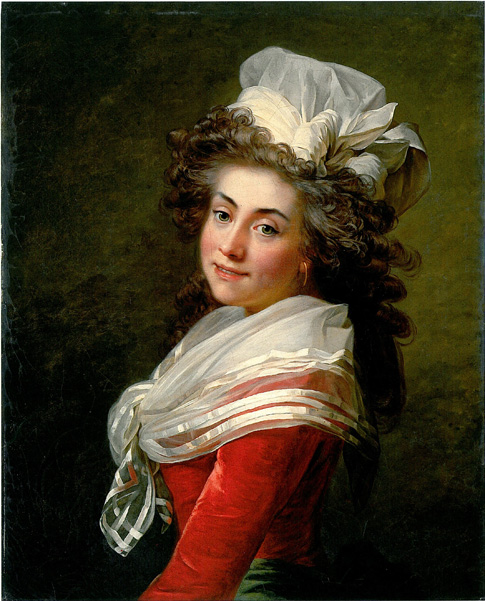
France, 1790

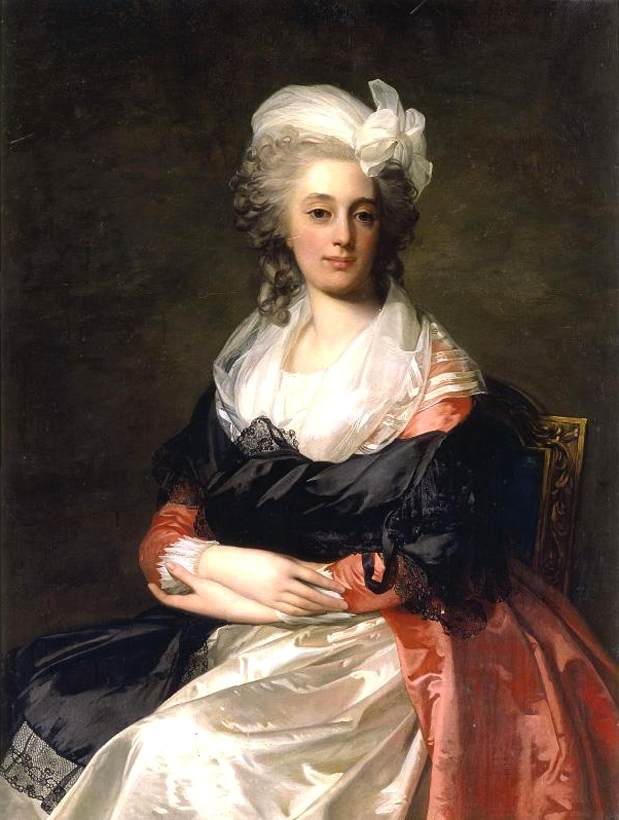
France, 1792

=== Spanish fashion ===
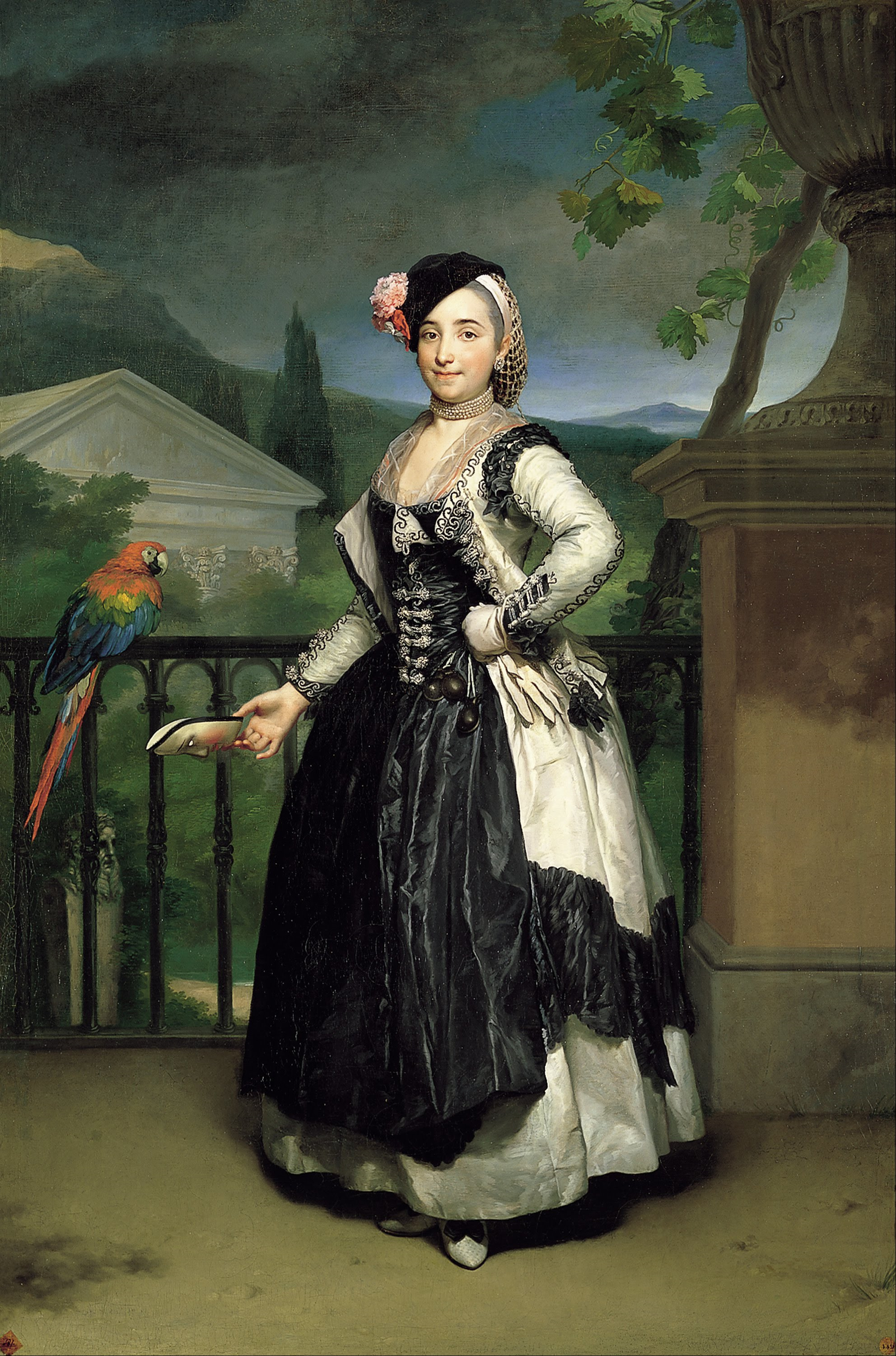
Spain, 1775

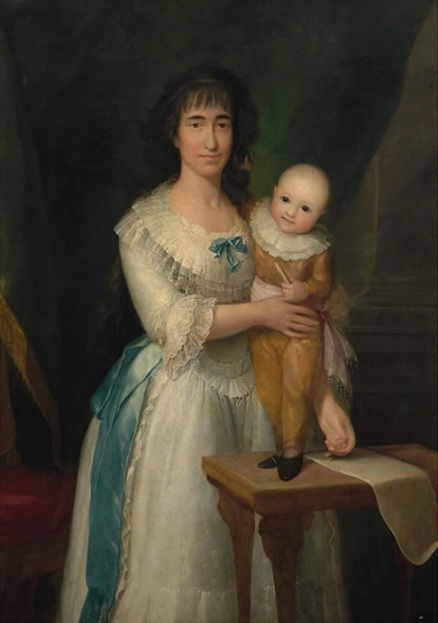
Spain, 1778

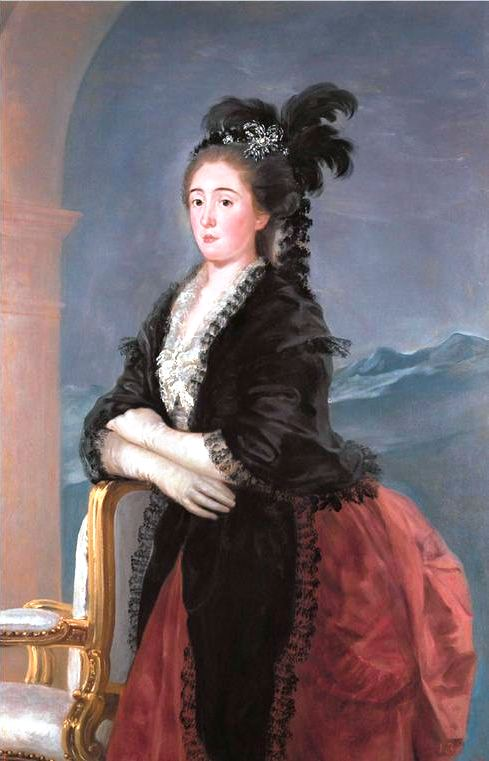
Spain, 1783

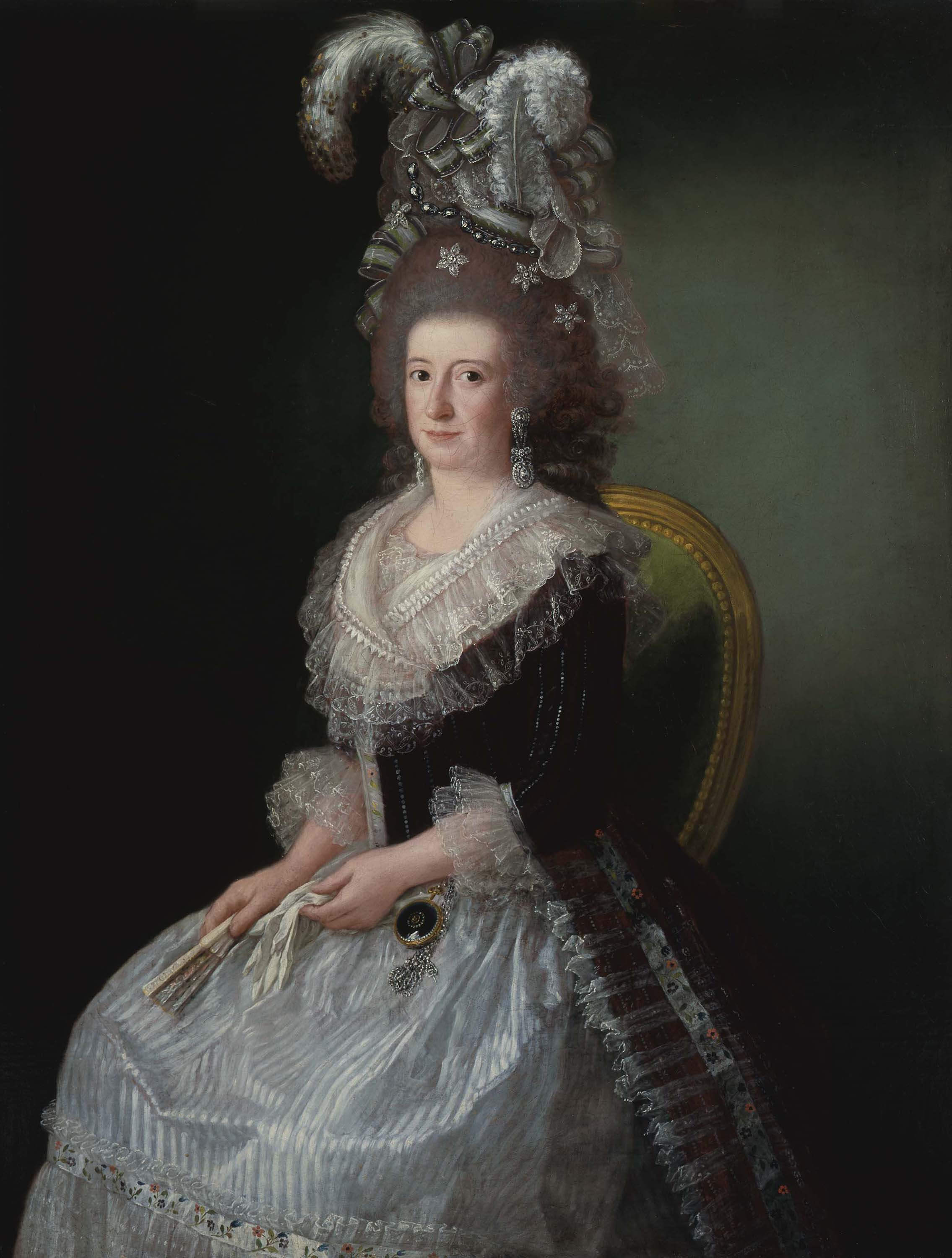
Spain, 1785

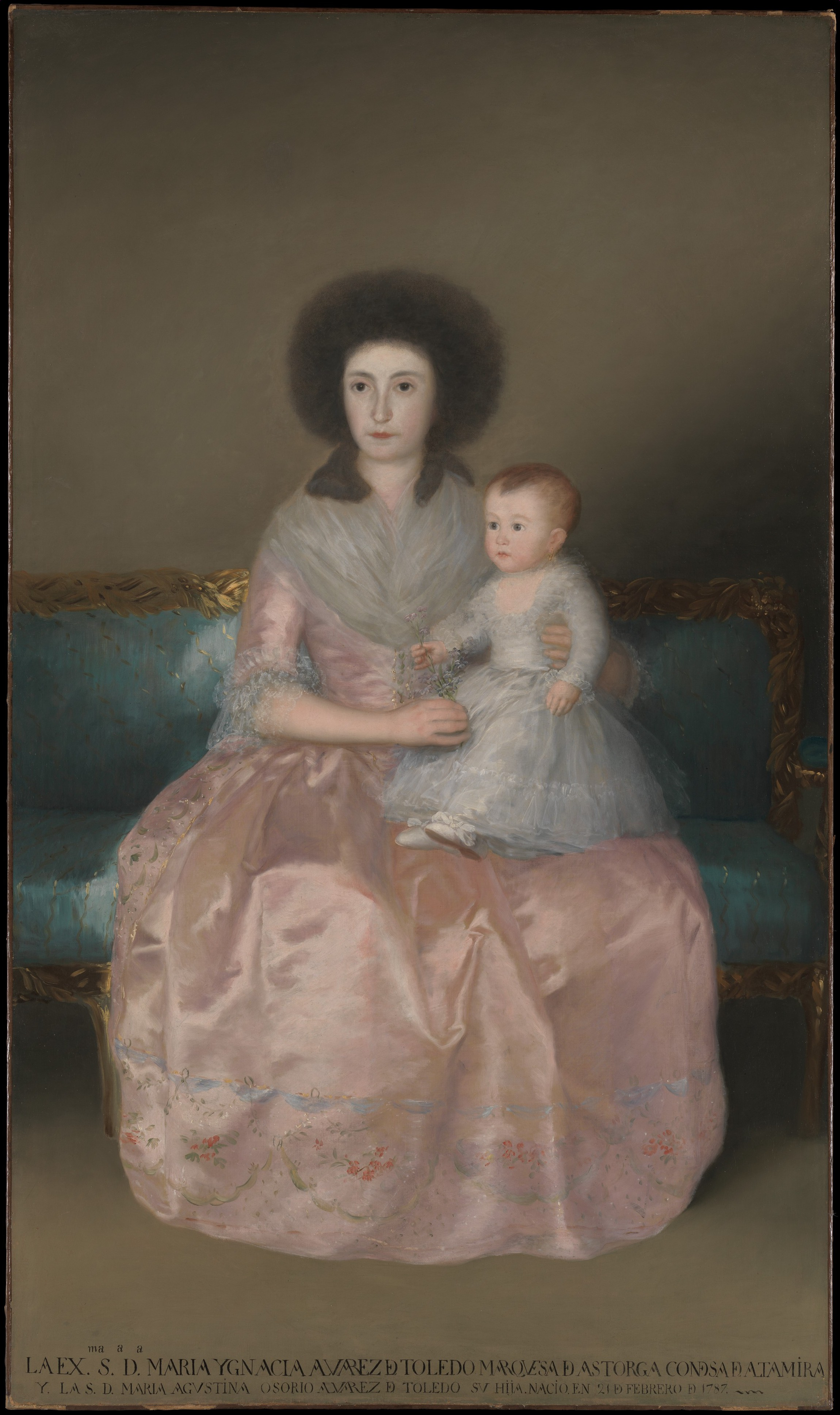
Spain, 1787

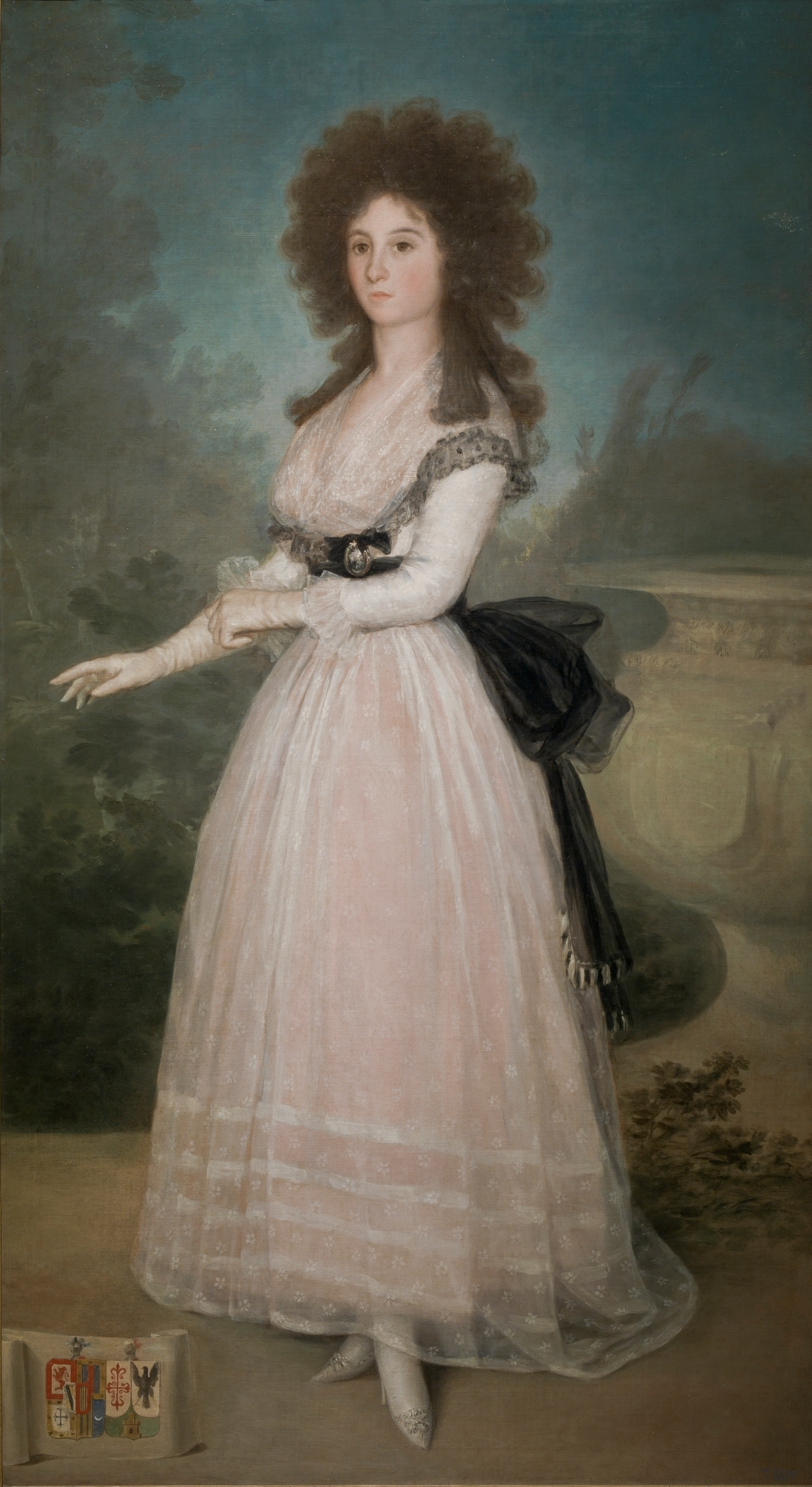
Spain, 1789

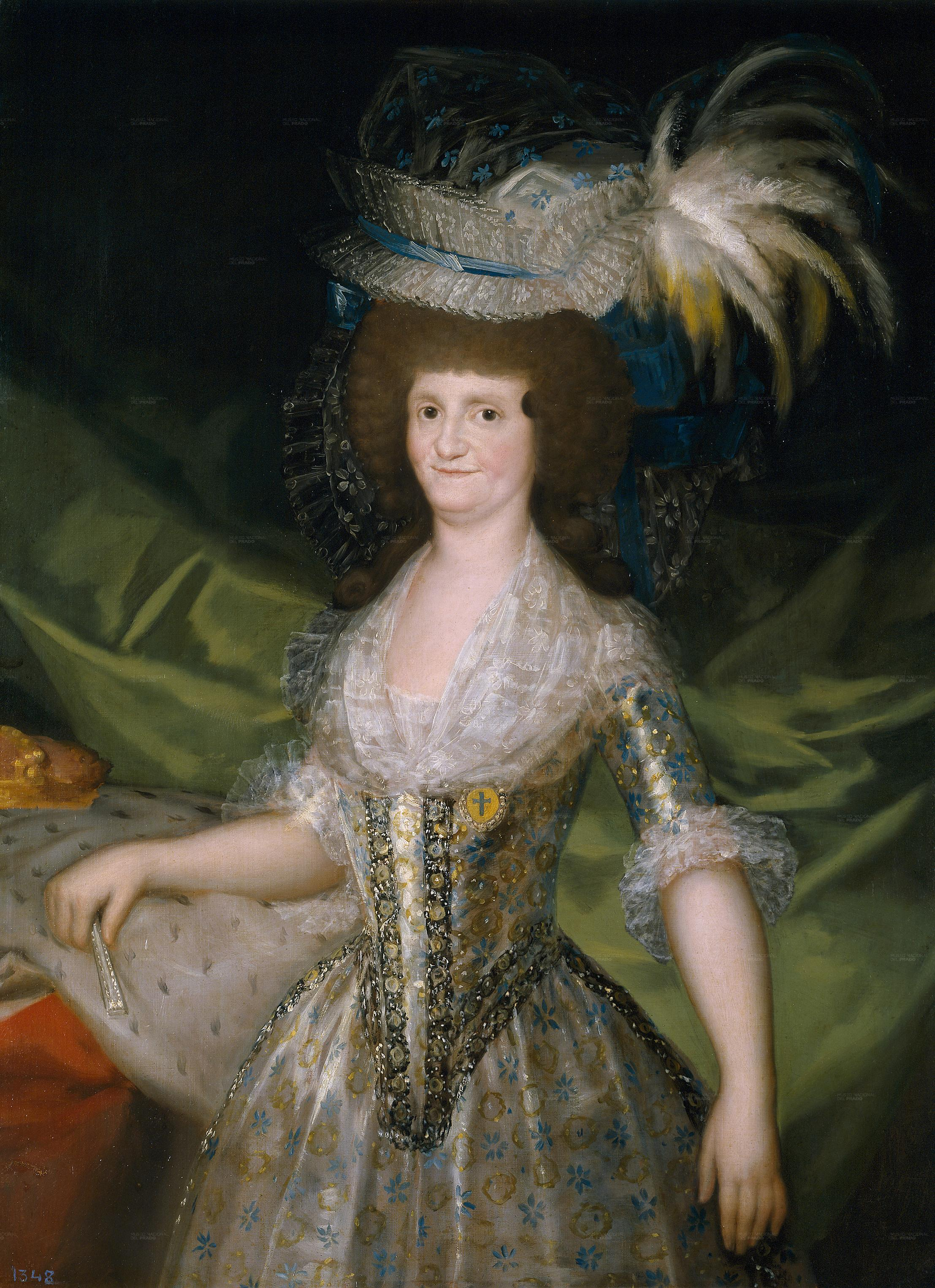
Spain, 1789

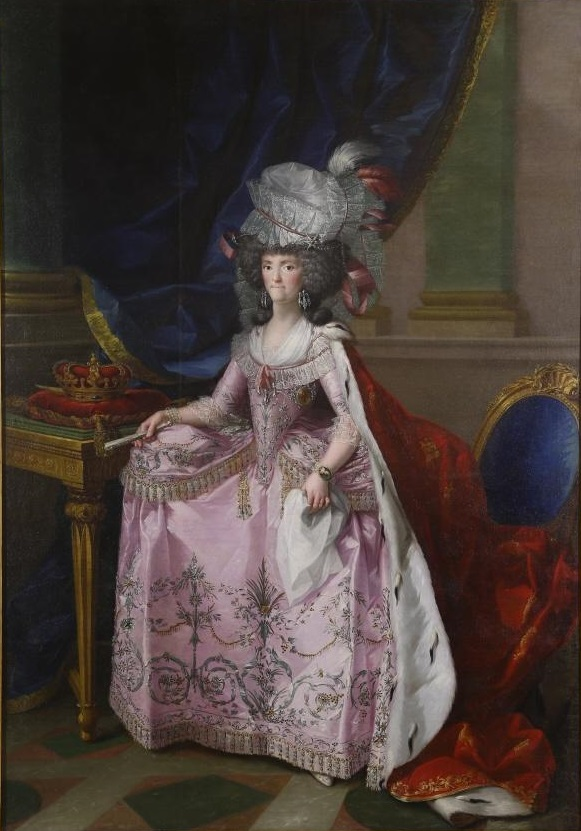
Spain, 1790

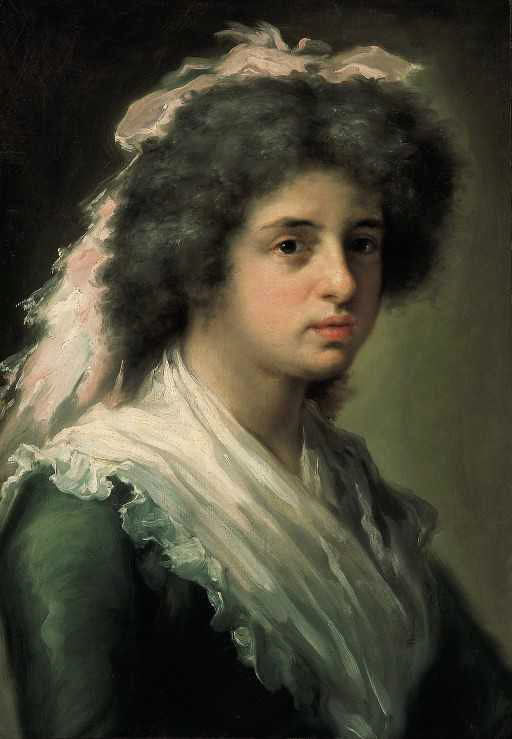
Spain, 1792

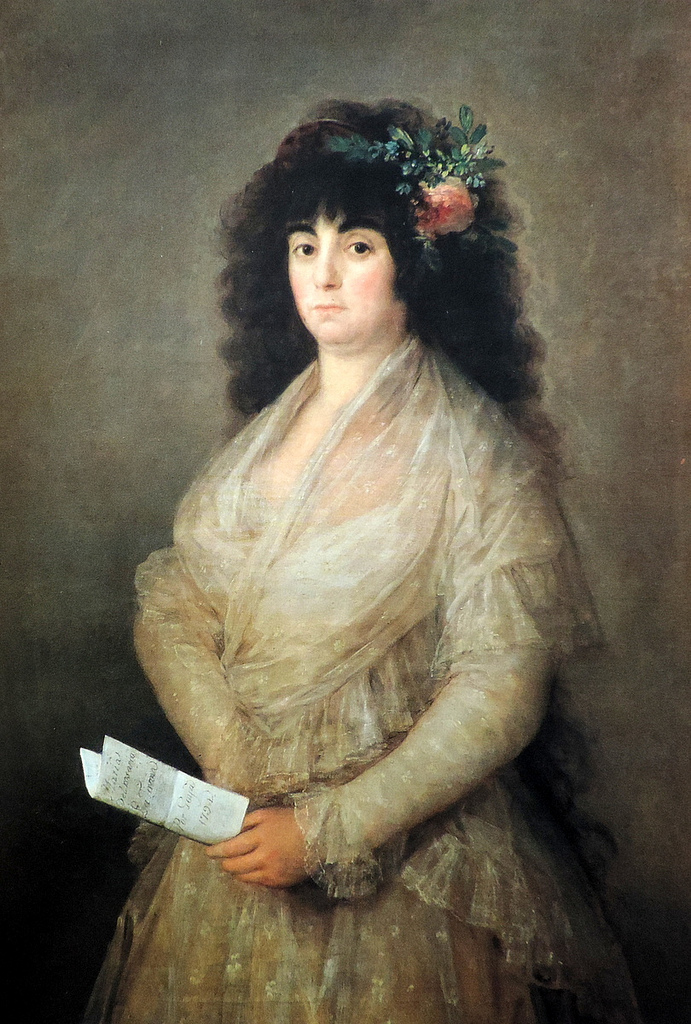
Spain, 1794

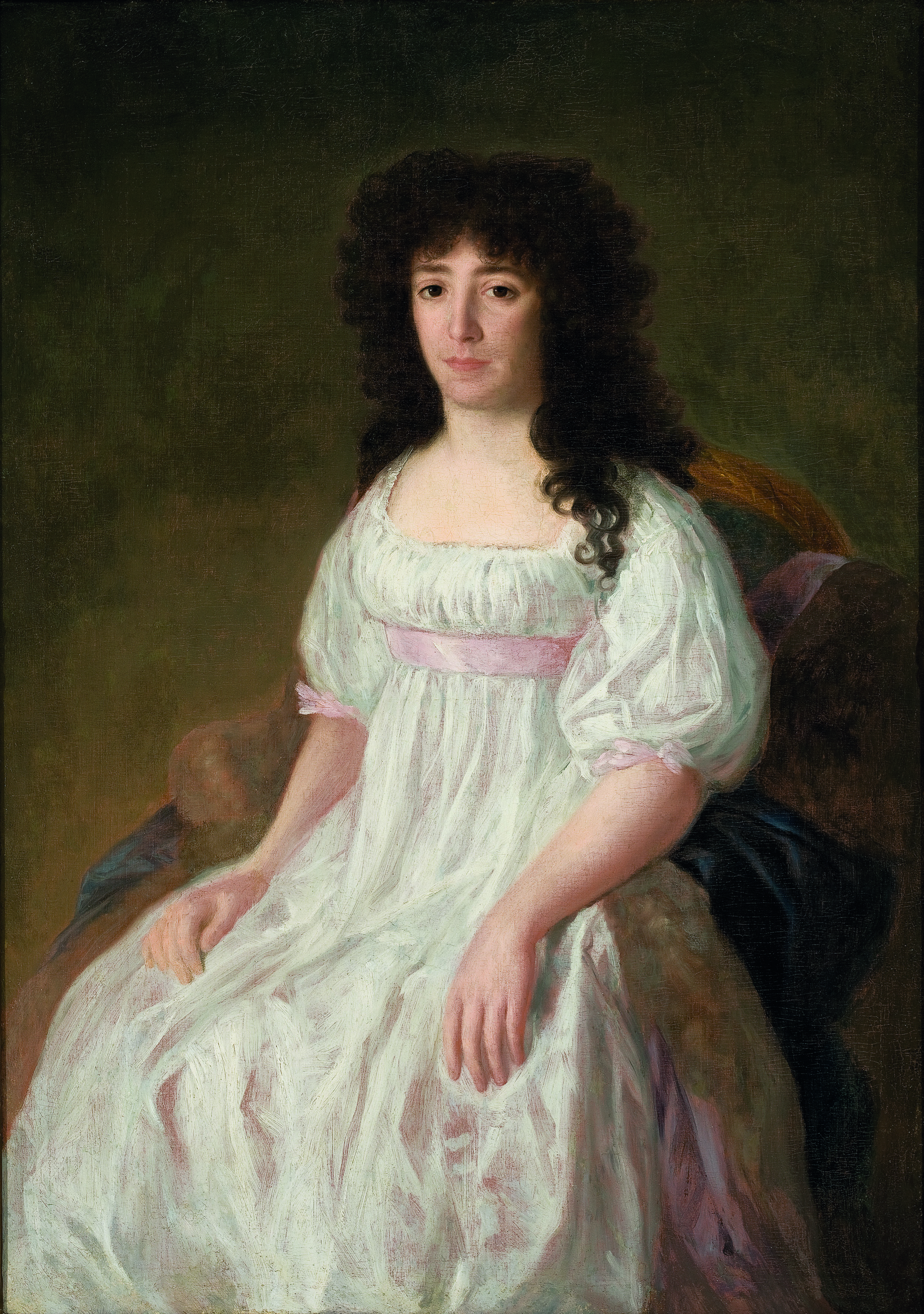
Spain, 1794

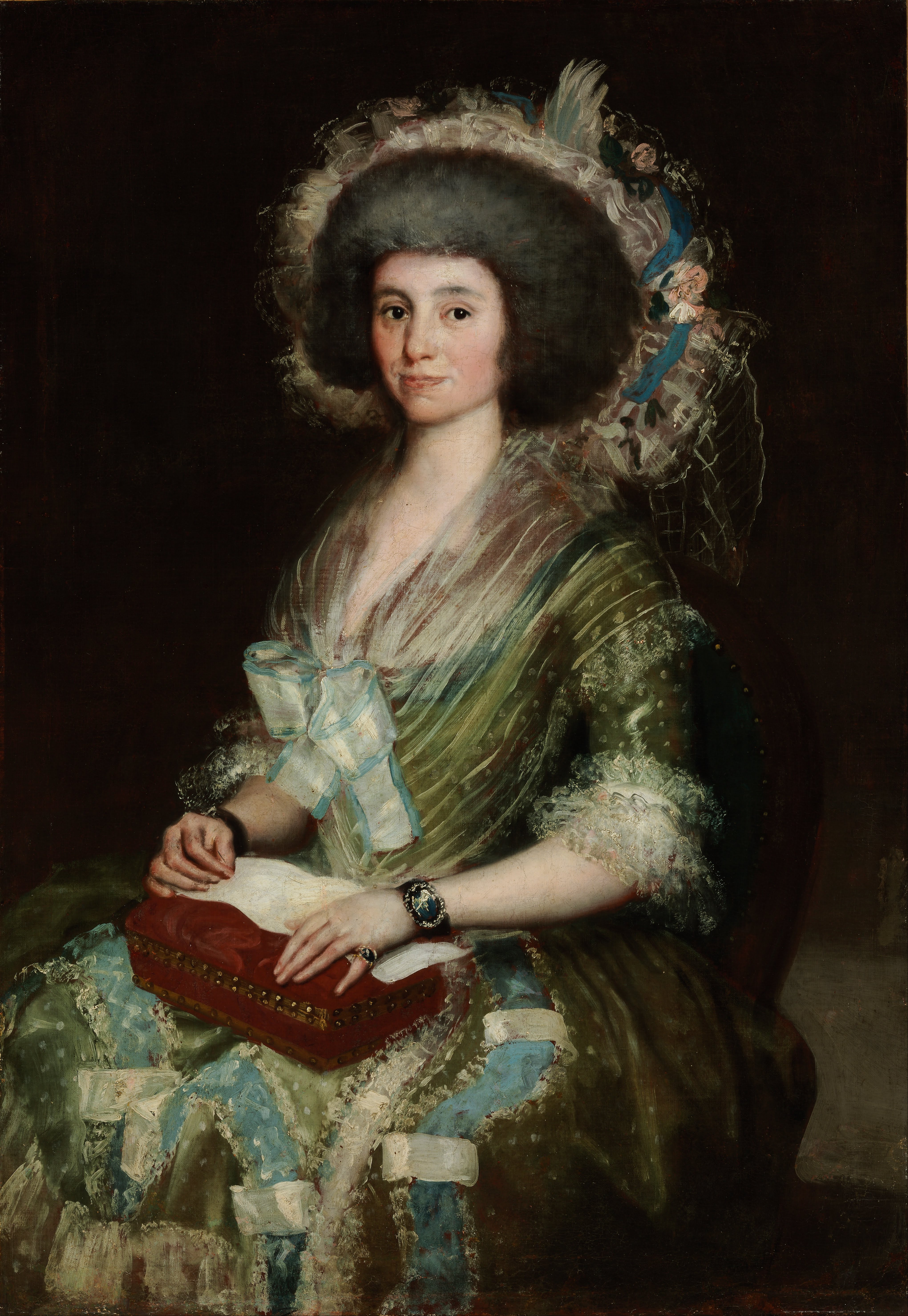
Spain, 1795

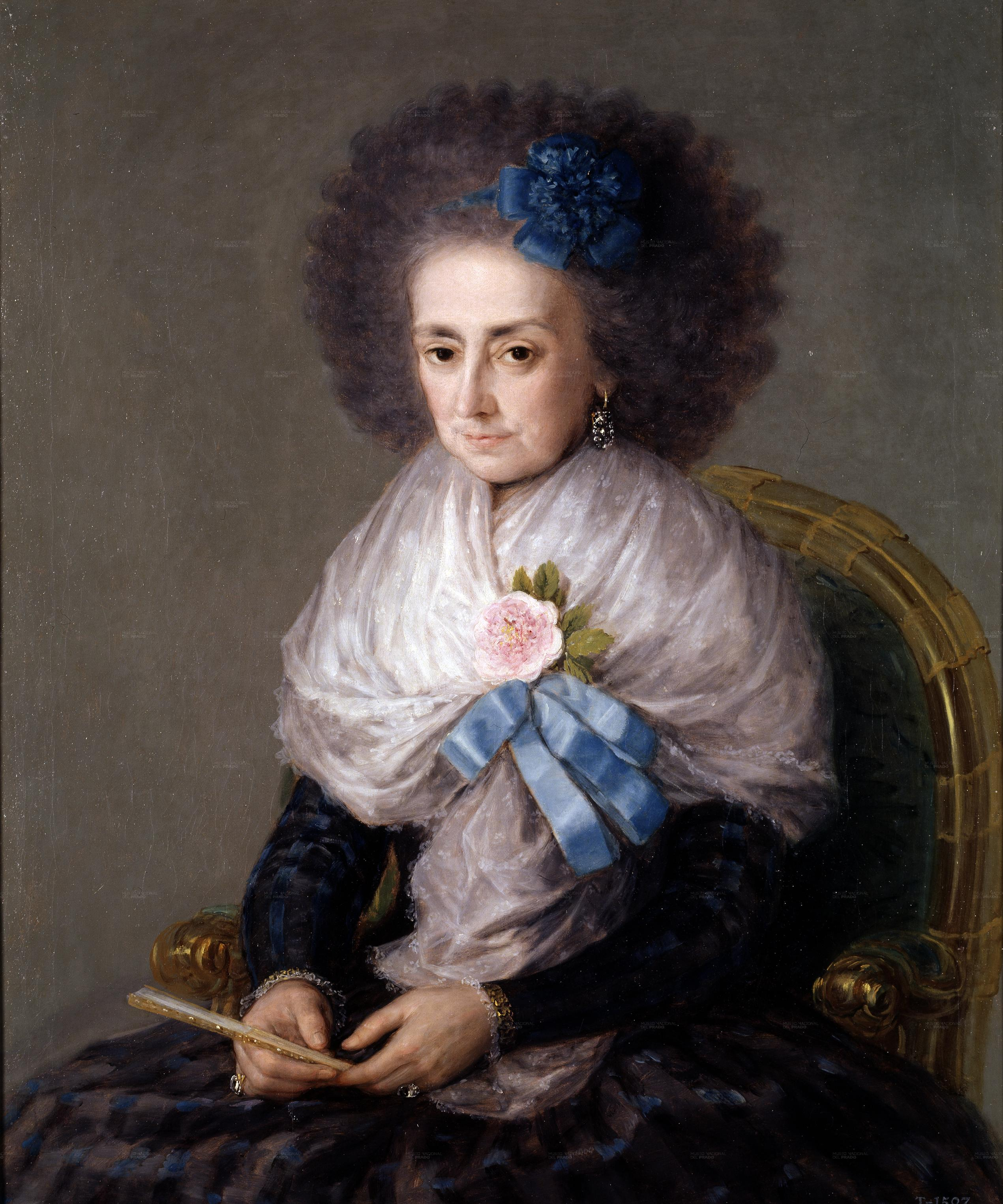
Spain, 1795

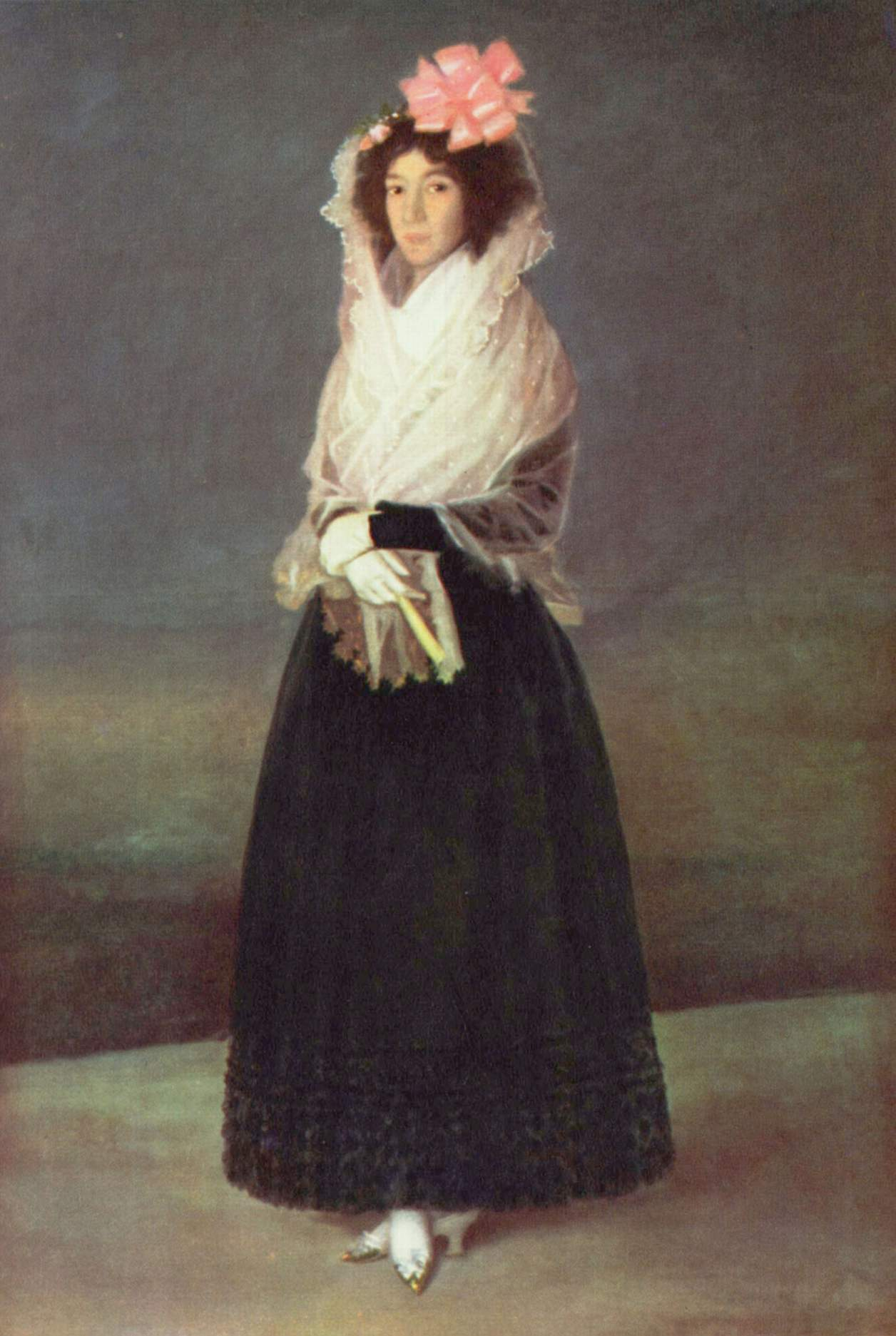
Spain, 1795

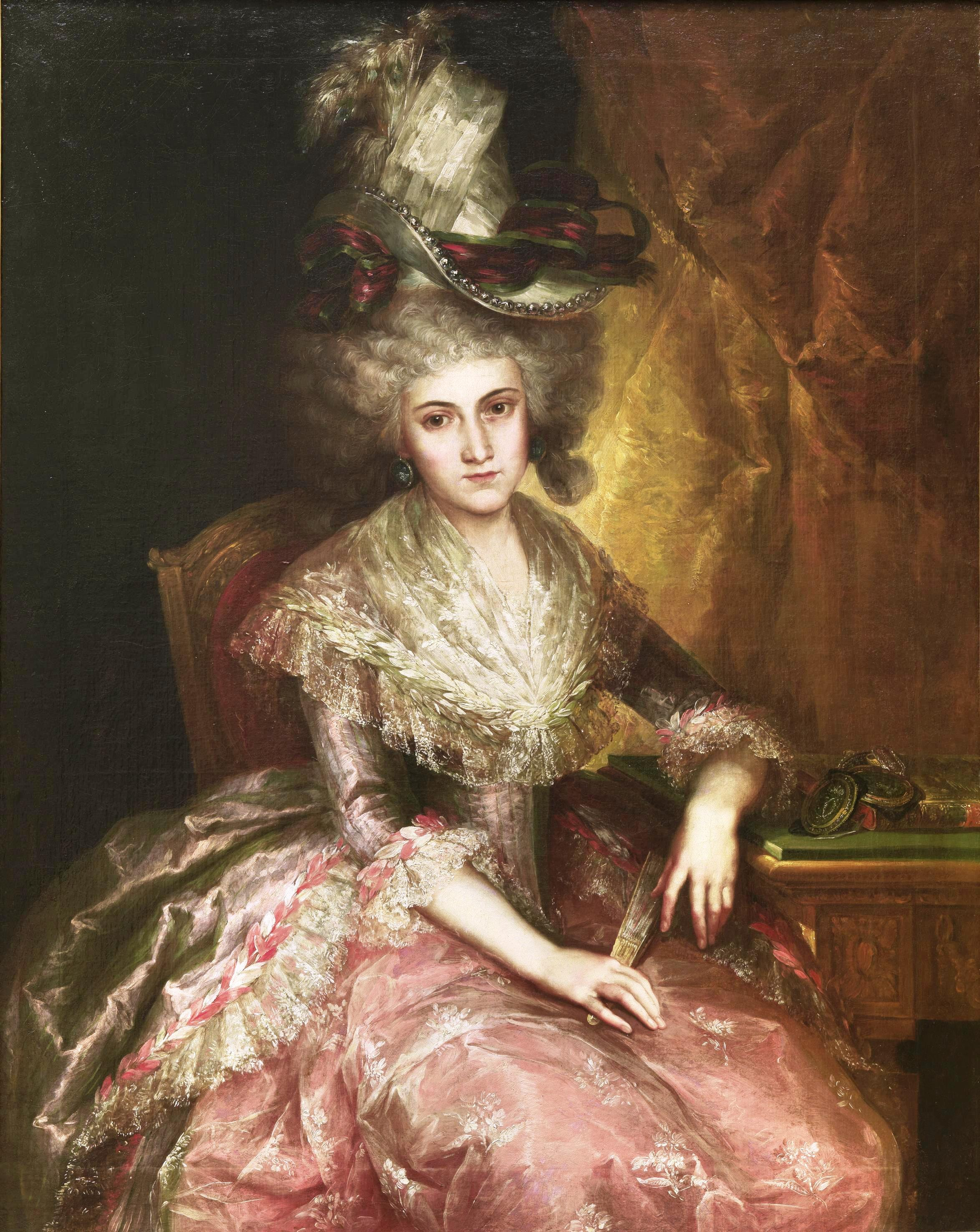
Spain, 1795

== Men's fashion ==
=== Overview ===
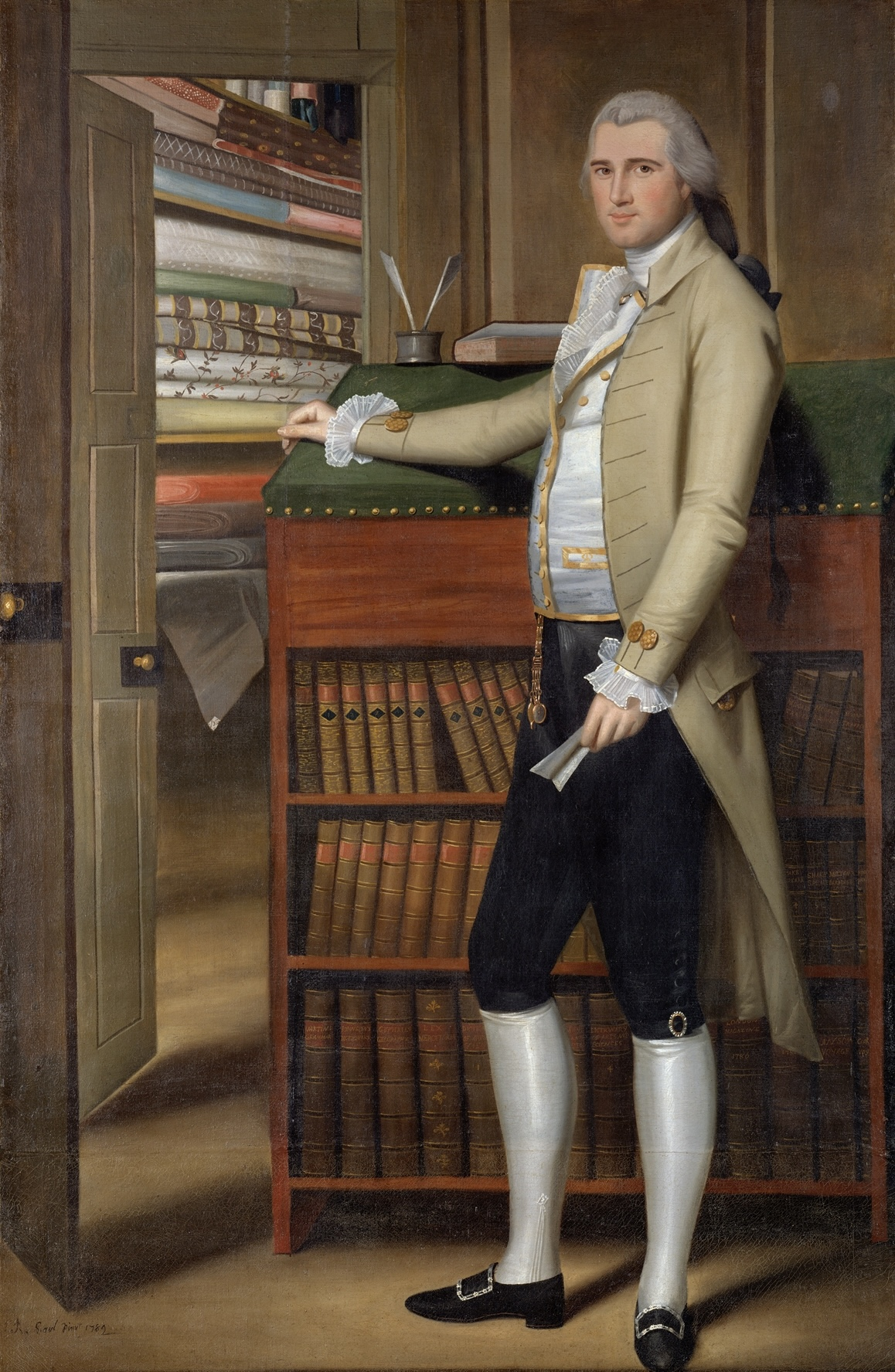
Elijah Boardman (1760–1823) wears a powdered wig tied in a queue, cutaway tailored coat over a waist-length satin waistcoat and dark knee-breeches. United States, 1789.

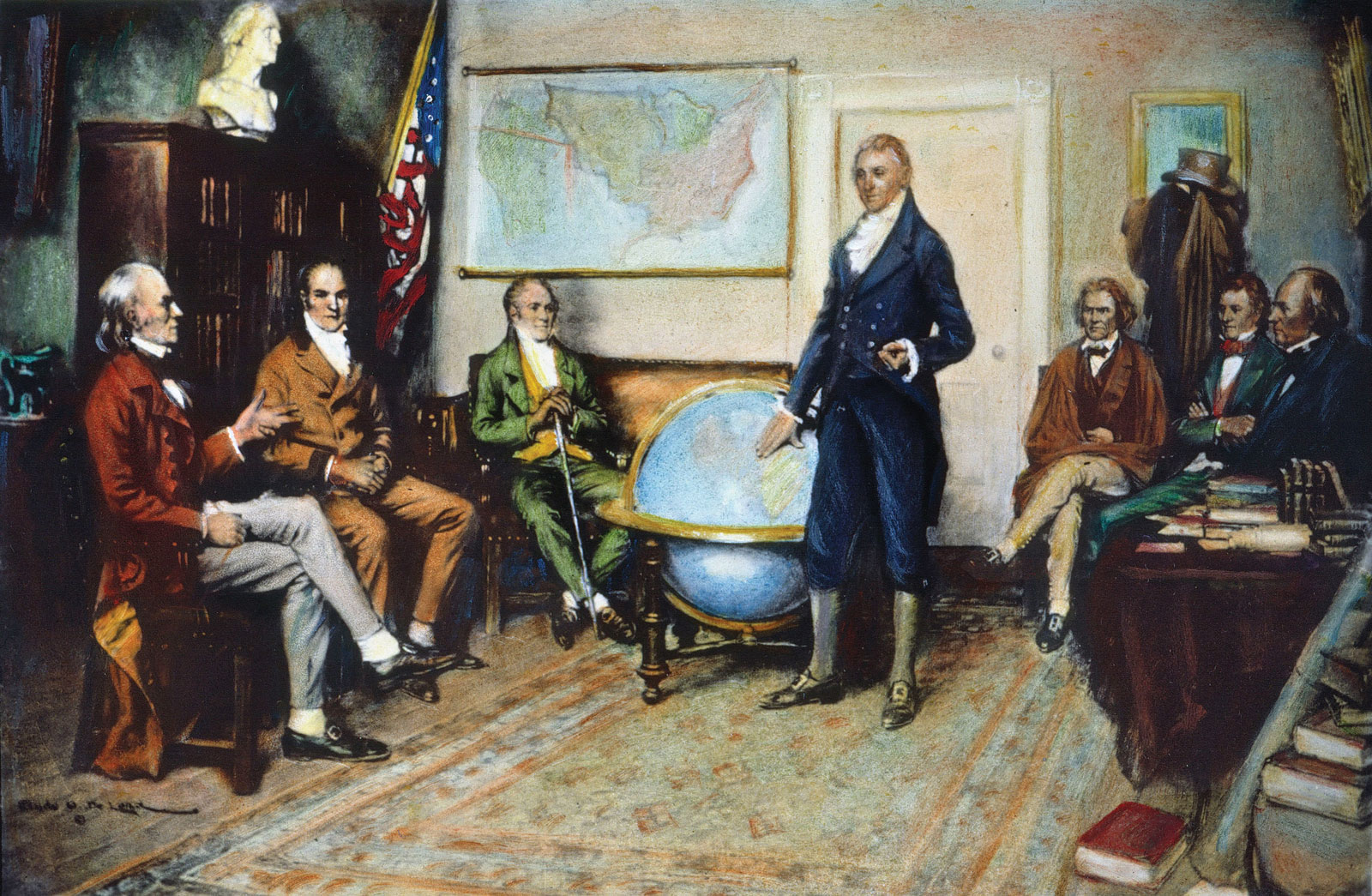
James Monroe (1758–1831), the last U.S. president who dressed according to an old-fashioned style of the 18th century, with his Cabinet, 1823. The president wears knee-breeches, while his secretaries (including the future president John Quincy Adams, sitting first from left) wear long trousers.

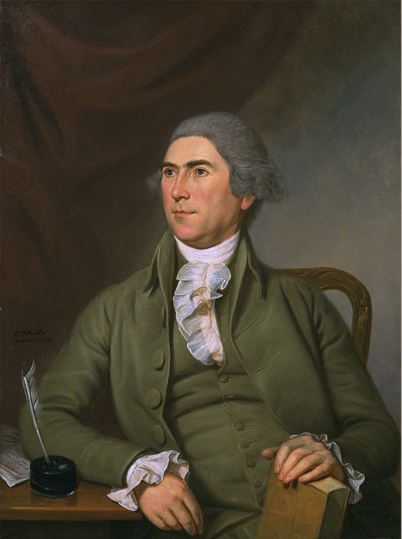
Charles Pettit (1736–1806) wears a matching coat, waistcoat, and breeches. Coat and waistcoat have covered buttons; those on the coat are much larger. His shirt has a sheer frill down the front. United States, 1792.

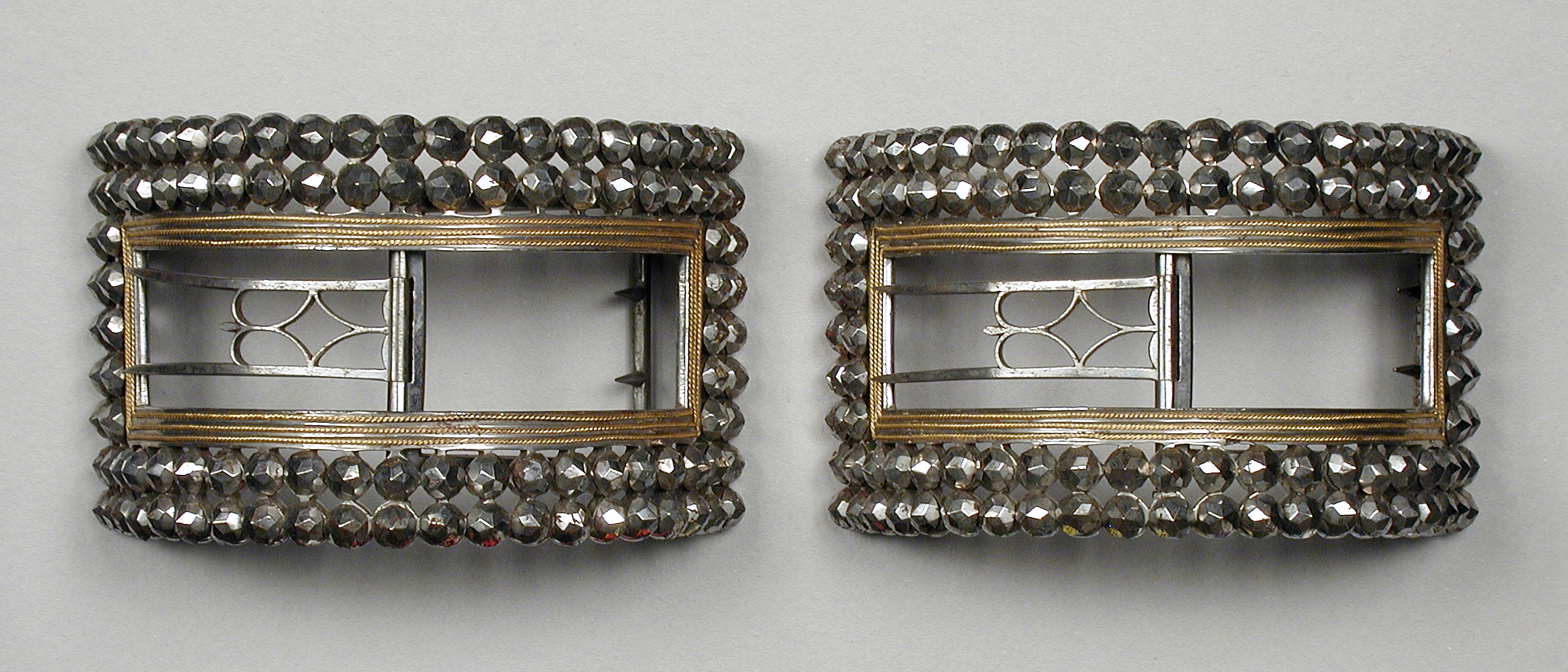
Pair of man's steel and gilt wire shoe buckles, c. 1777–1785. Los Angeles County Museum of Art, M.80.92.6a-b

Throughout the period, men continued to wear the coat, waistcoat, and knee-breeches. However, changes were seen in both the fabric used as well as the cut of these garments. More attention was paid to individual pieces of the suit, and each element underwent stylistic changes. Under new enthusiasms for outdoor sports and country pursuits, the elaborately embroidered silks and velvets characteristic of "full dress" or formal attire earlier in the century gradually gave way to carefully tailored woolen "undress" garments for all occasions except the most formal.

In Boston and Philadelphia in the decades around the American Revolution, the adoption of plain undress styles was a conscious reaction to the excesses of European court dress; Benjamin Franklin caused a sensation by appearing at the French court in his own hair (rather than a wig) and the plain costume of Quaker Philadelphia. At the other extreme was the "macaroni".

In the United States, only the first five Presidents, from George Washington (1732–1799) to James Monroe (1758–1831), dressed according to this fashion, including wearing of powdered wigs tied in a queue (except for Washington who powdered, curled and tied in a queue his own long hair), tricorne hats and knee-breeches. James Monroe earned the nickname "The Last Cocked Hat" because of this. His successor John Quincy Adams (1767–1848) wore a short haircut instead of long hair tied in a queue and long trousers instead of knee-breeches at his inaugural ceremony in 1825, thus becoming the first president to have made the change of dress.

The latest-born notable person to be portrayed wearing a powdered wig tied in a queue according to this fashion was Archduke John of Austria (born in 1782, portrayed in c. 1795).

=== Coats ===
By the 1770s, coats exhibited a tighter, narrower cut than seen in earlier periods, and were occasionally double-breasted. Toward the 1780s, the skirts of the coat began to be cutaway in a curve from the front waist. Waistcoats gradually shortened until they were waist-length and cut straight across. Waistcoats could be made with or without sleeves. As in the previous period, a loose, T-shaped silk, cotton or linen gown called a banyan was worn at home as a sort of dressing gown over the shirt, waistcoat, and breeches. Men of an intellectual or philosophical bent were painted wearing banyans, with their own hair or a soft cap rather than a wig. This aesthetic overlapped slightly with the female fashion of the skirt and proves the way in which male and female fashions reflected one another as styles became less rigid and more suitable for movement and leisure.

A coat with a wide collar called a frock coat, derived from a traditional working-class coat, was worn for hunting and other country pursuits in both Britain and America. Although originally designed as sporting wear, frock coats gradually came into fashion as everyday wear. The frock coat was cut with a turned down collar, reduced side pleats, and small, round cuffs, sometimes cut with a slit to allow for added movement. Sober, natural colors were worn, and coats were made from woolen cloth, or a wool and silk mix.

=== Shirt and stock ===
Shirt sleeves were full, gathered at the wrist and dropped shoulder. Full-dress shirts had ruffles of fine fabric or lace, while undress shirts ended in plain wrist bands. A small turnover collar returned to fashion, worn with the stock. In England, clean, white linen shirts were considered important in Men's attire. The cravat reappeared at the end of the period.

=== Breeches, shoes, and stockings ===
As coats became cutaway, more attention was paid to the cut and fit of the breeches. Breeches fitted snugly and had a fall-front opening.

Low-heeled leather shoes fastened with shoe buckles were worn with silk or woolen stockings. Boots were worn for riding. The buckles were either polished metal, usually in silver (sometimes with the metal cut into false stones in the Paris style) or with paste stones, although there were other types. These buckles were often quite large and one of the world's largest collections can be seen at Kenwood House; with the French Revolution they were abandoned in France as a signifier of aristocracy.

=== Hairstyles and headgear ===
Powdered wigs tied in a queue were worn for formal occasions, or the hair was worn long, curled and powdered, brushed back from the forehead and clubbed (tied back at the nape of the neck in a queue) with a black ribbon. Due to the association with a ruling class in France the wearing of wigs as a symbol of social status was largely abandoned during the period of the French Revolution (1789–1799). While in the early phase of the revolution most revolutionary leaders, including younger ones, kept wearing a powdered wig as the standard wardrobe, later during the period of the Directory (1795–1799) the popularity of wig-wearing rapidly decreased.

The wide-brimmed tricorne hats turned up on three sides were now turned up front and back or on the sides to form bicornes. Toward the end of the period, a tall, slightly conical hat with a narrower brim became fashionable (this would evolve into the top hat in the next period).

Leaders of the French Revolution in powdered wigs
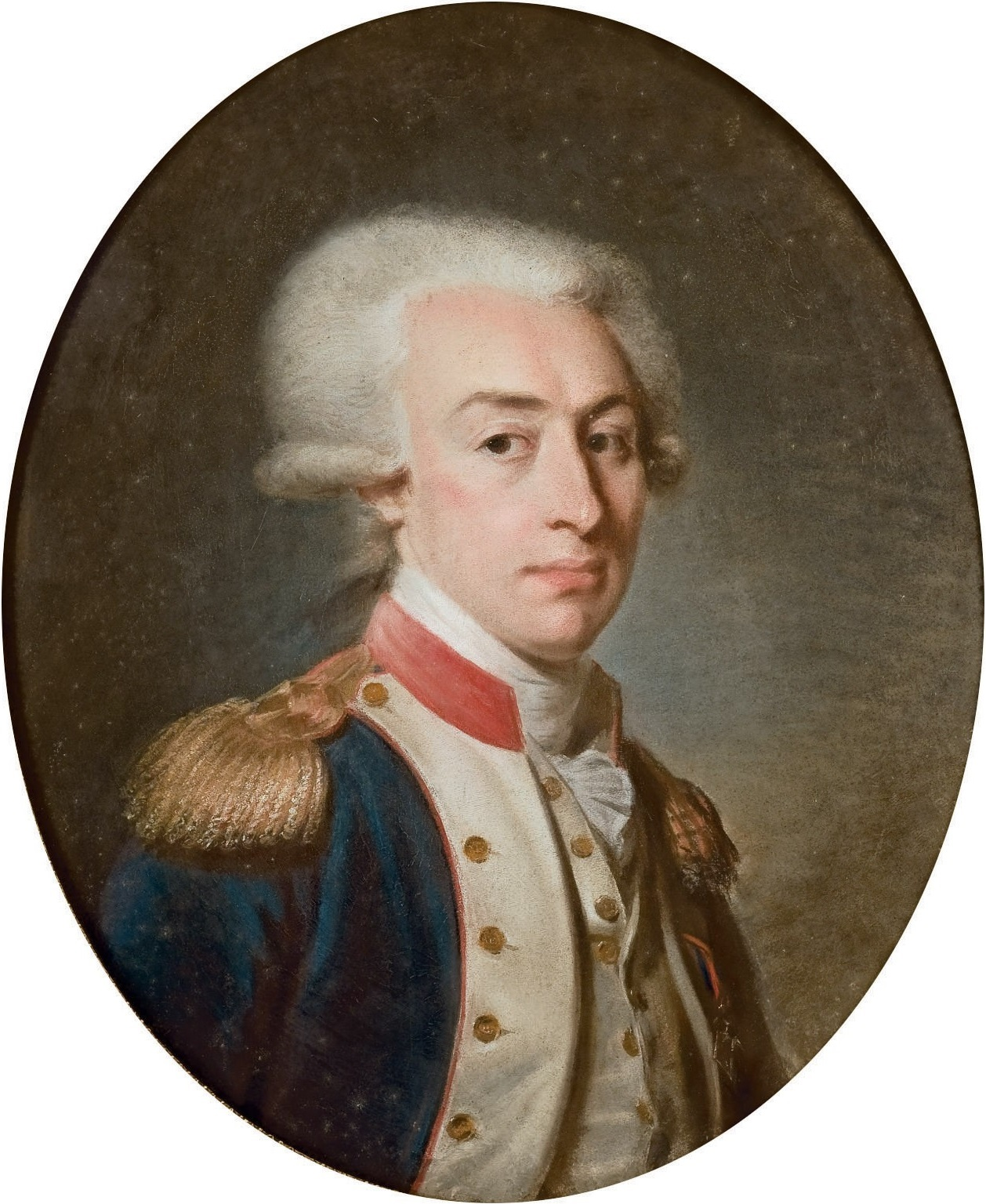
Marquis de Lafayette (1757–1834).

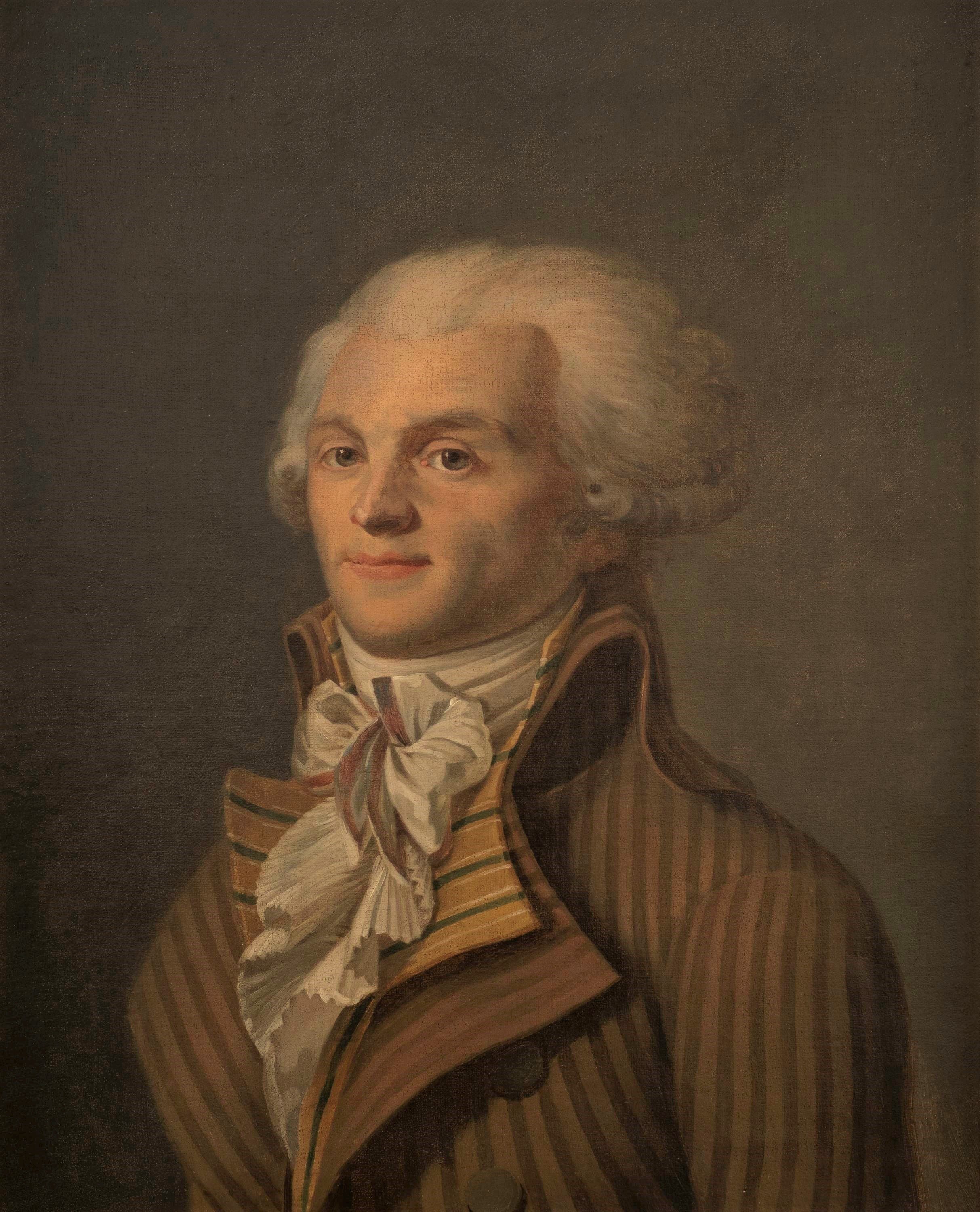
Maximilien Robespierre (1758–1794).

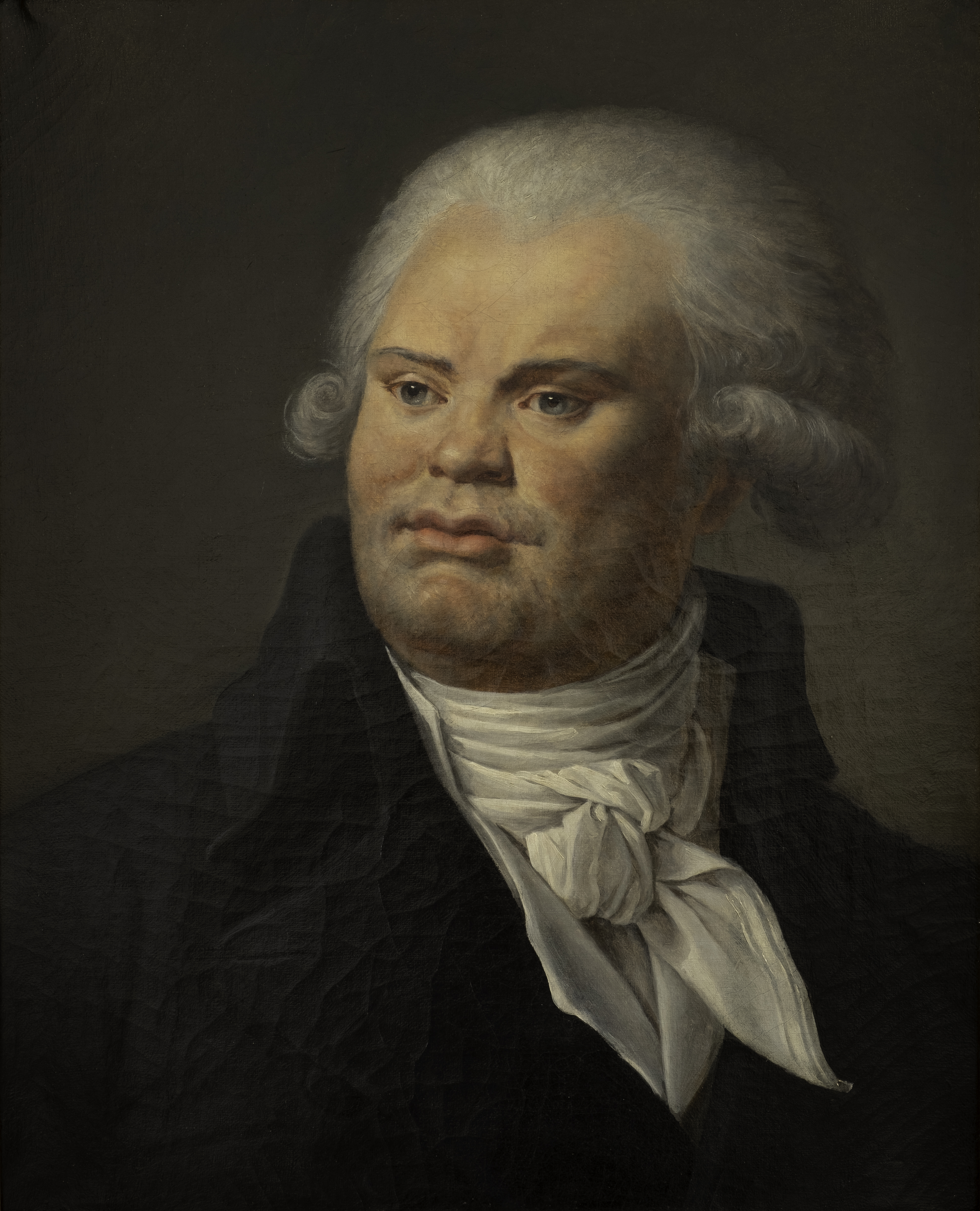
Georges Danton (1759–1794).

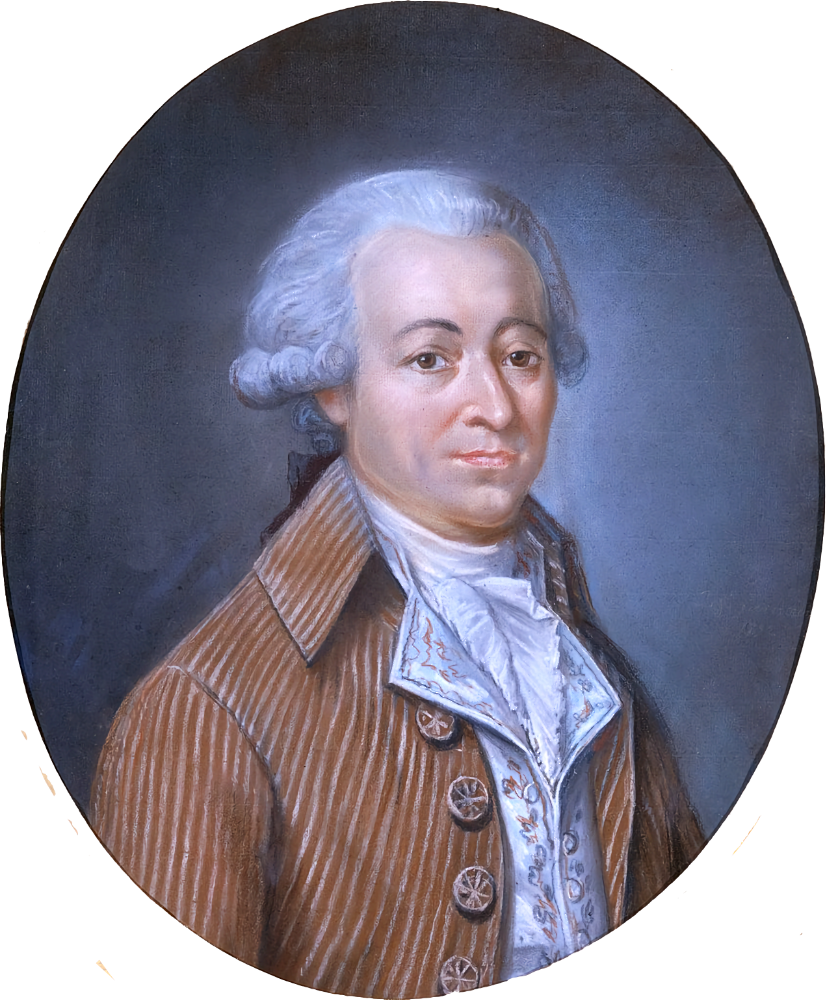
François Buzot (1760–1794).

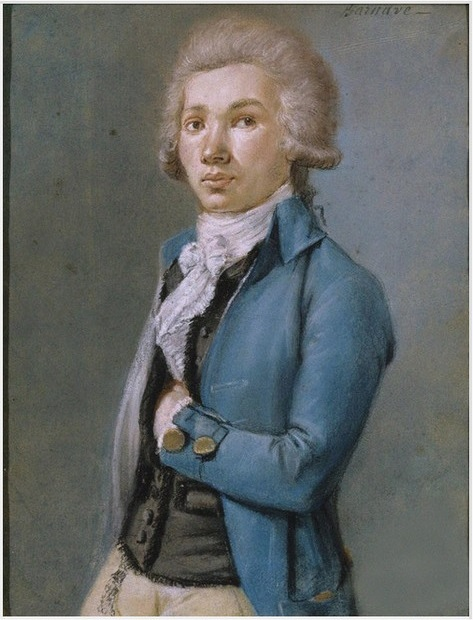
Antoine Barnave (1761–1793).

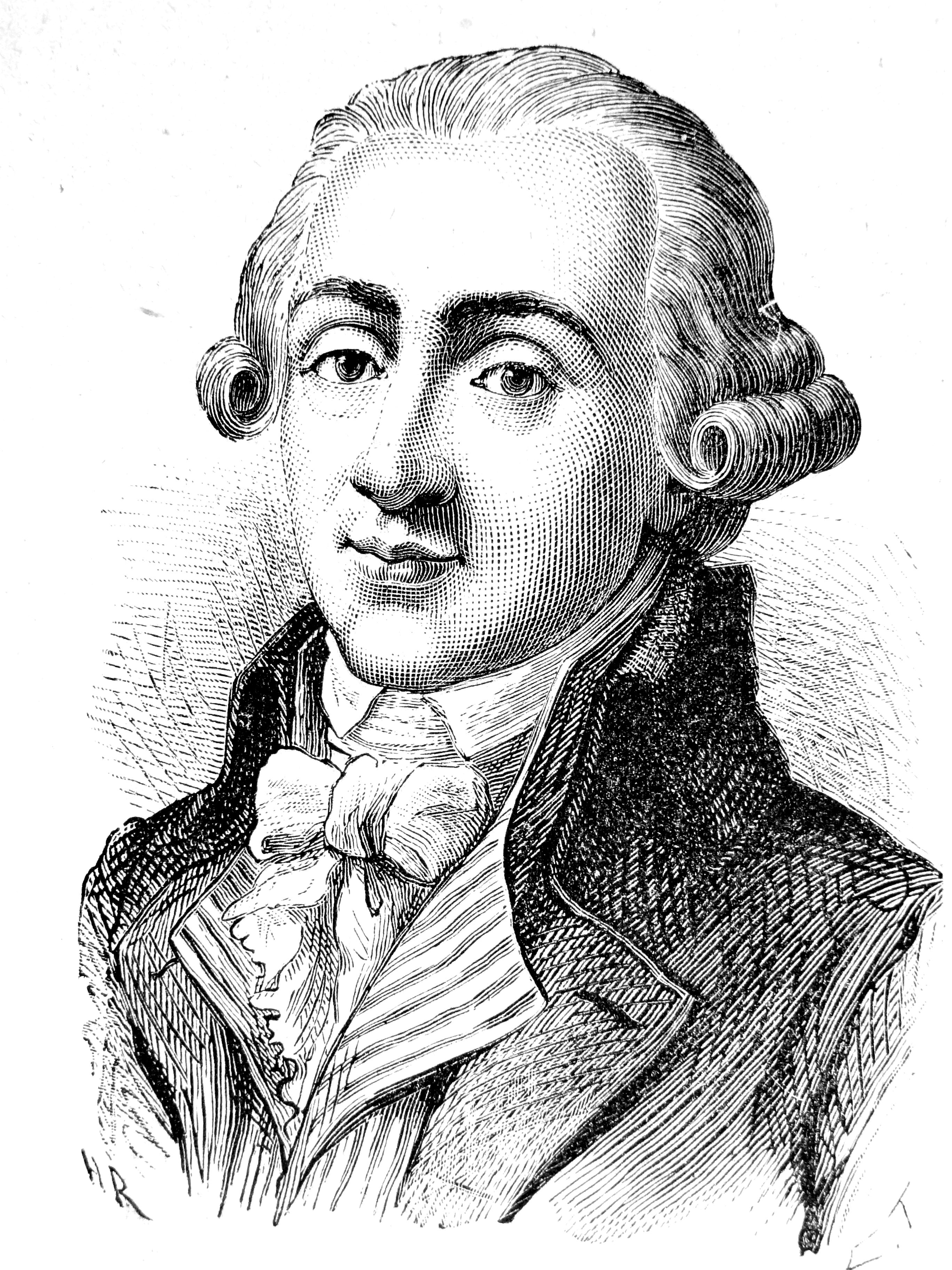
Jean-Lambert Tallien (1767–1820).

=== Style gallery ===
==== 1775–1795 ====
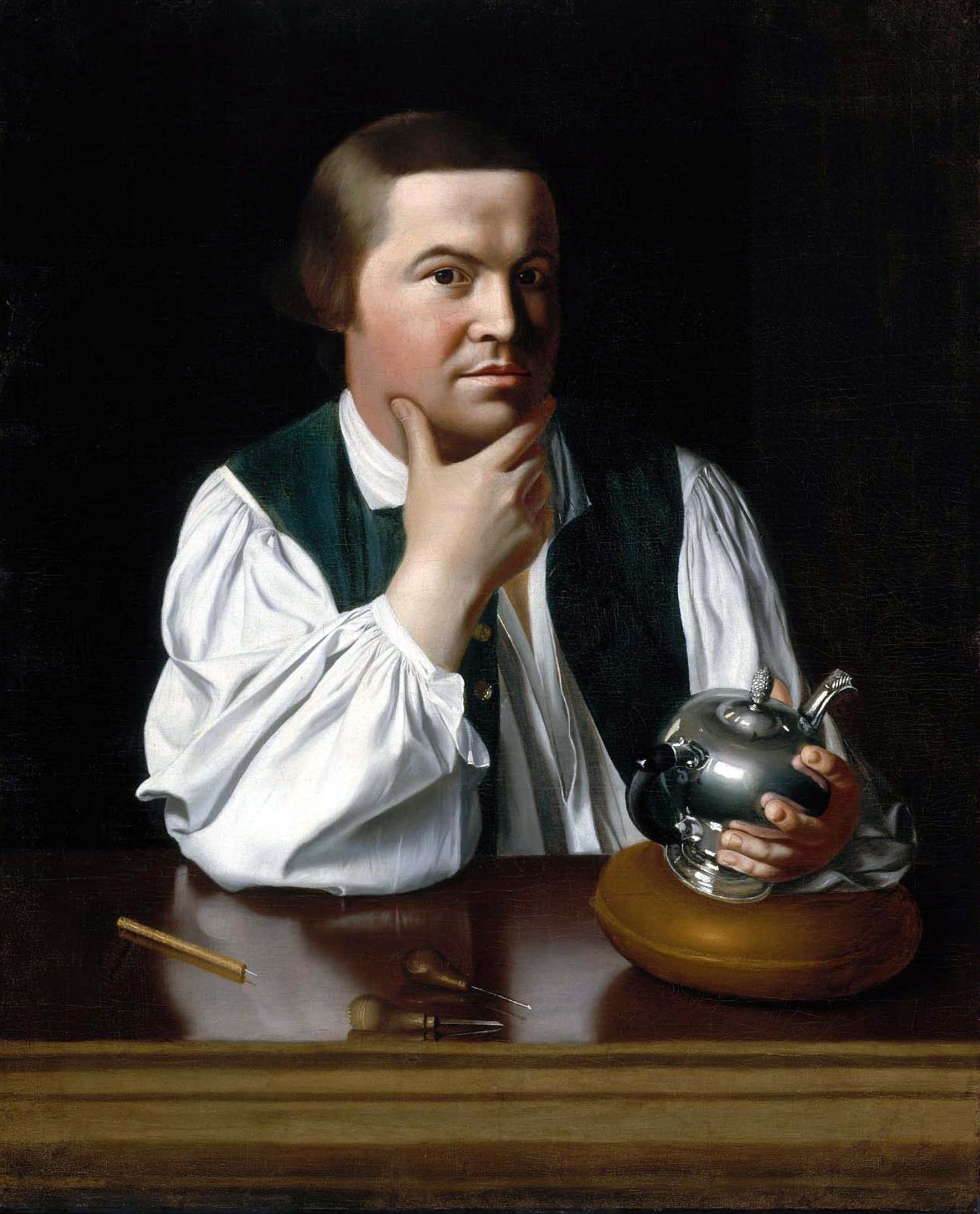
1 – 1776

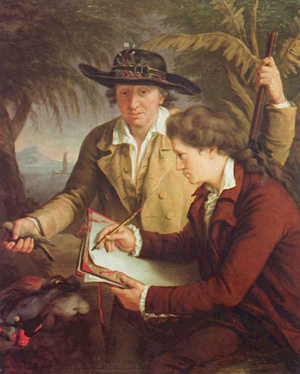
2 – 1775–80

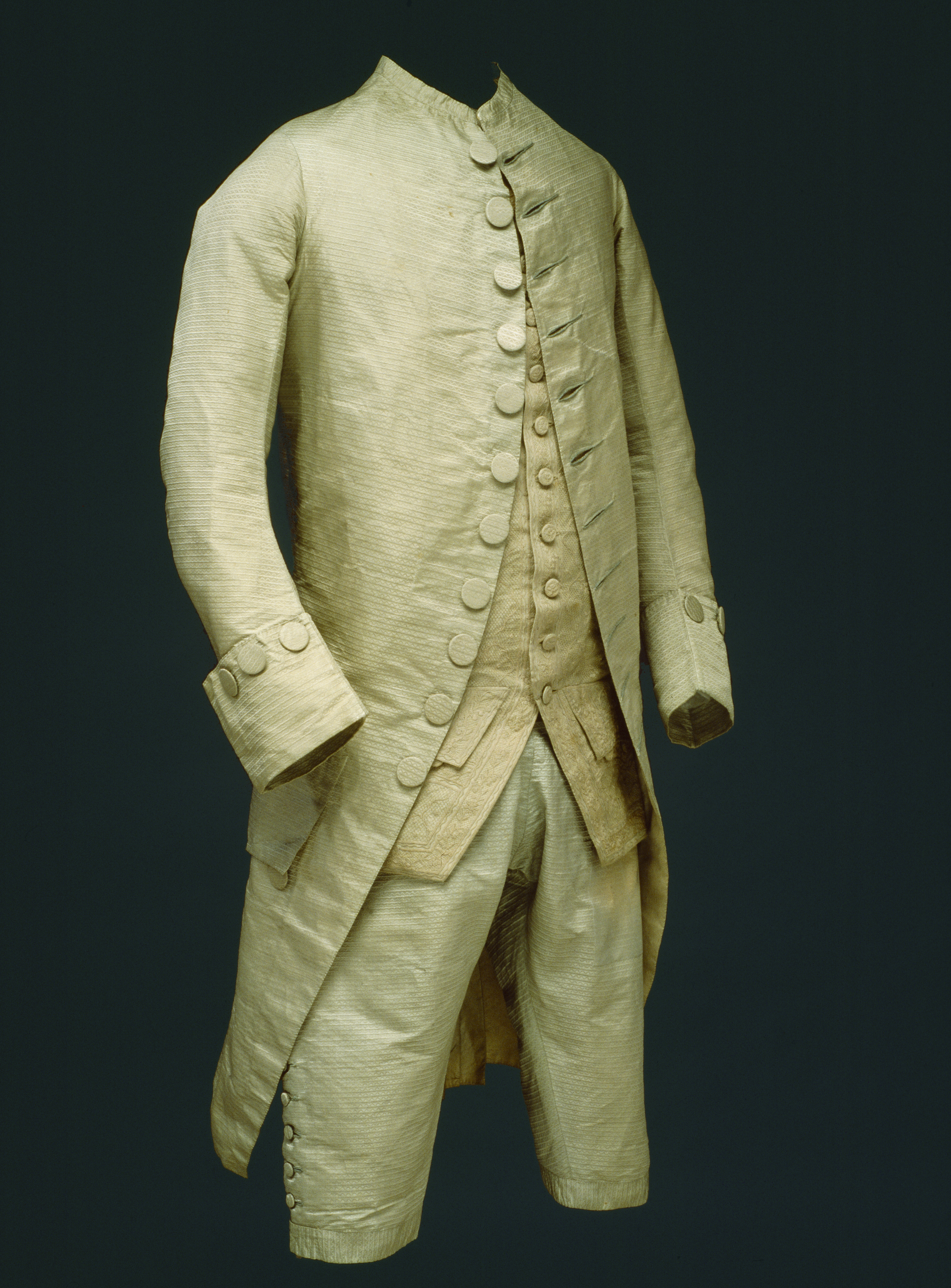
3 –1777

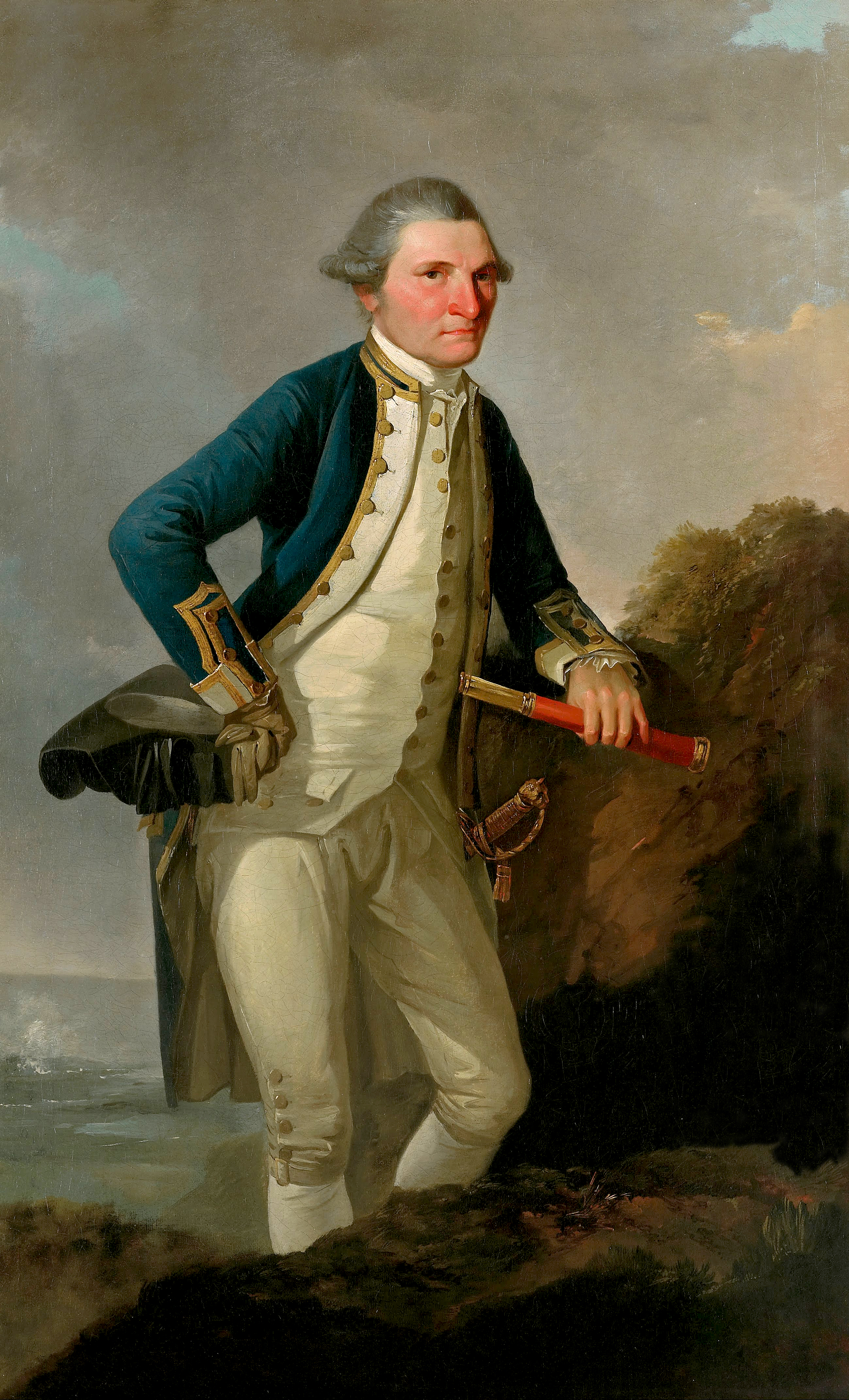
4 –1780

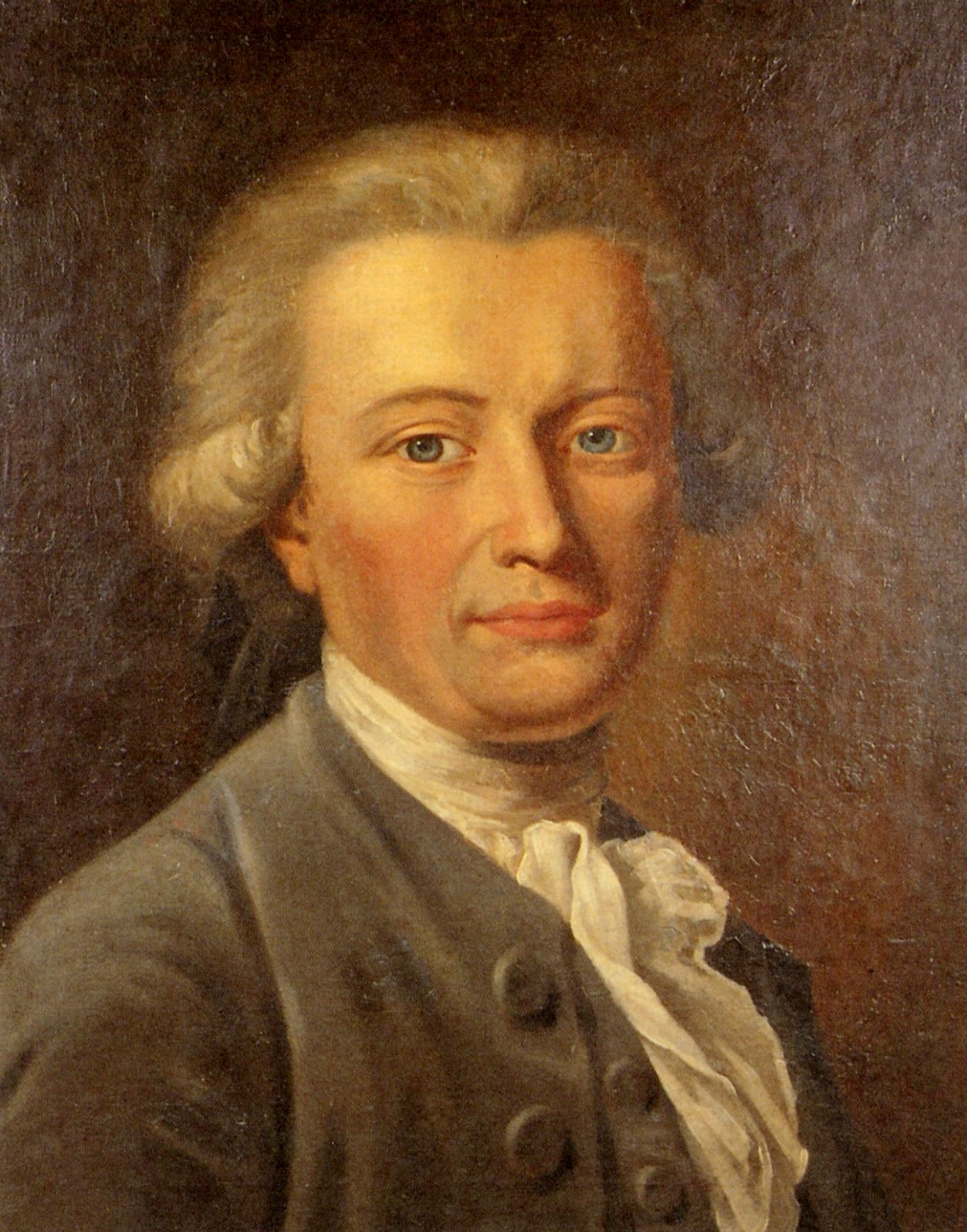
5 – c. 1785

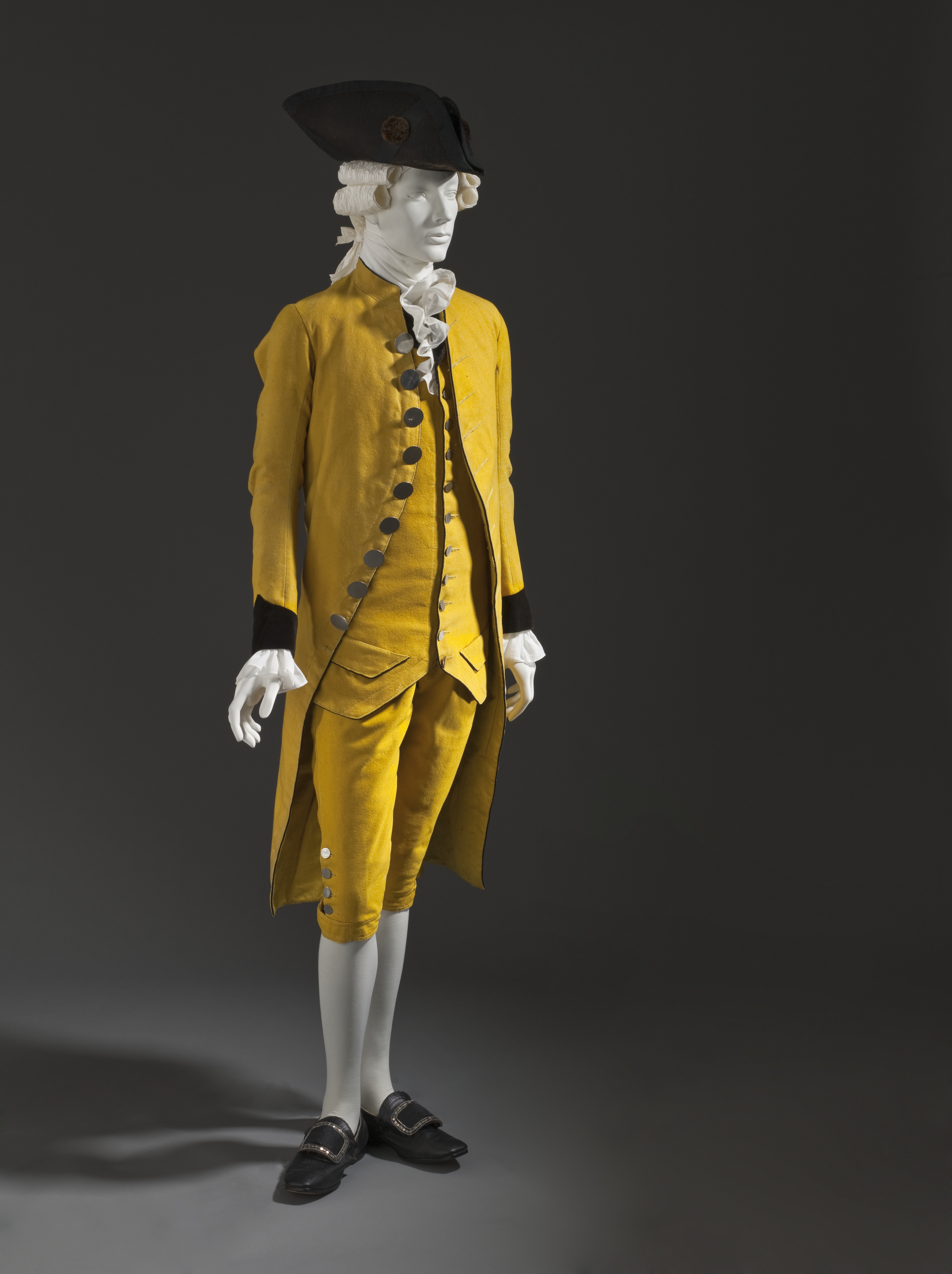
6 – c. 1785

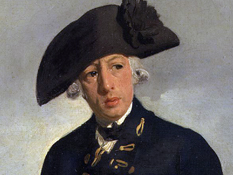
7 – 1786

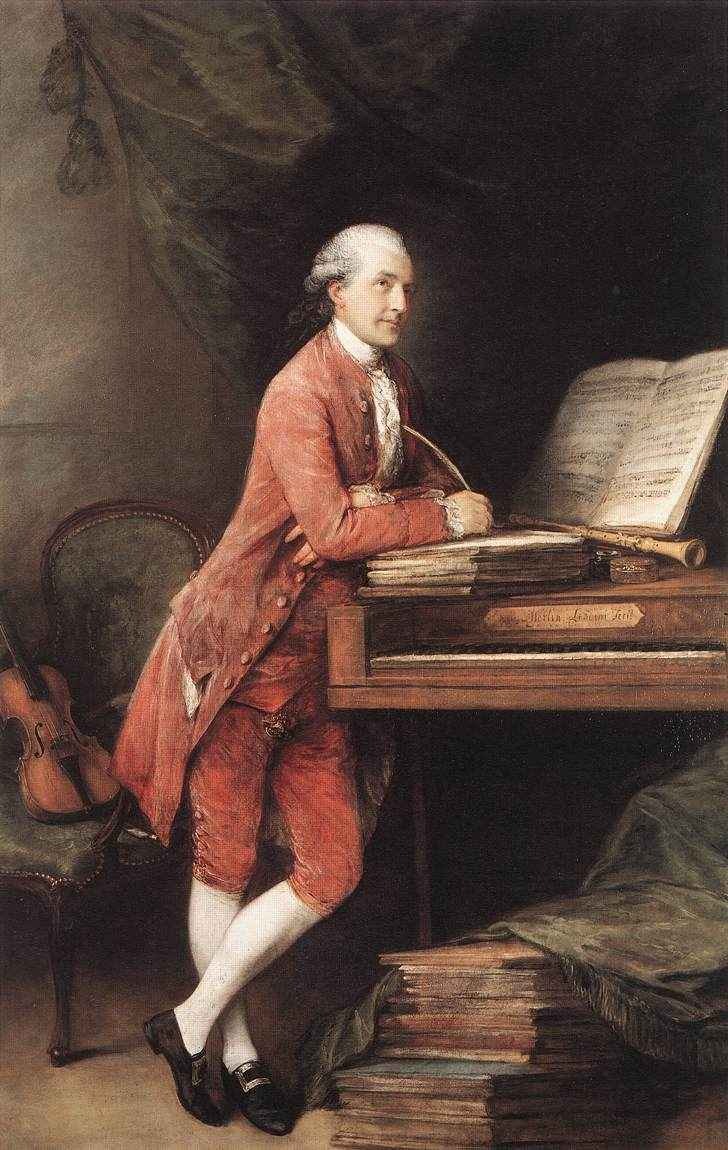
8 – 1780s

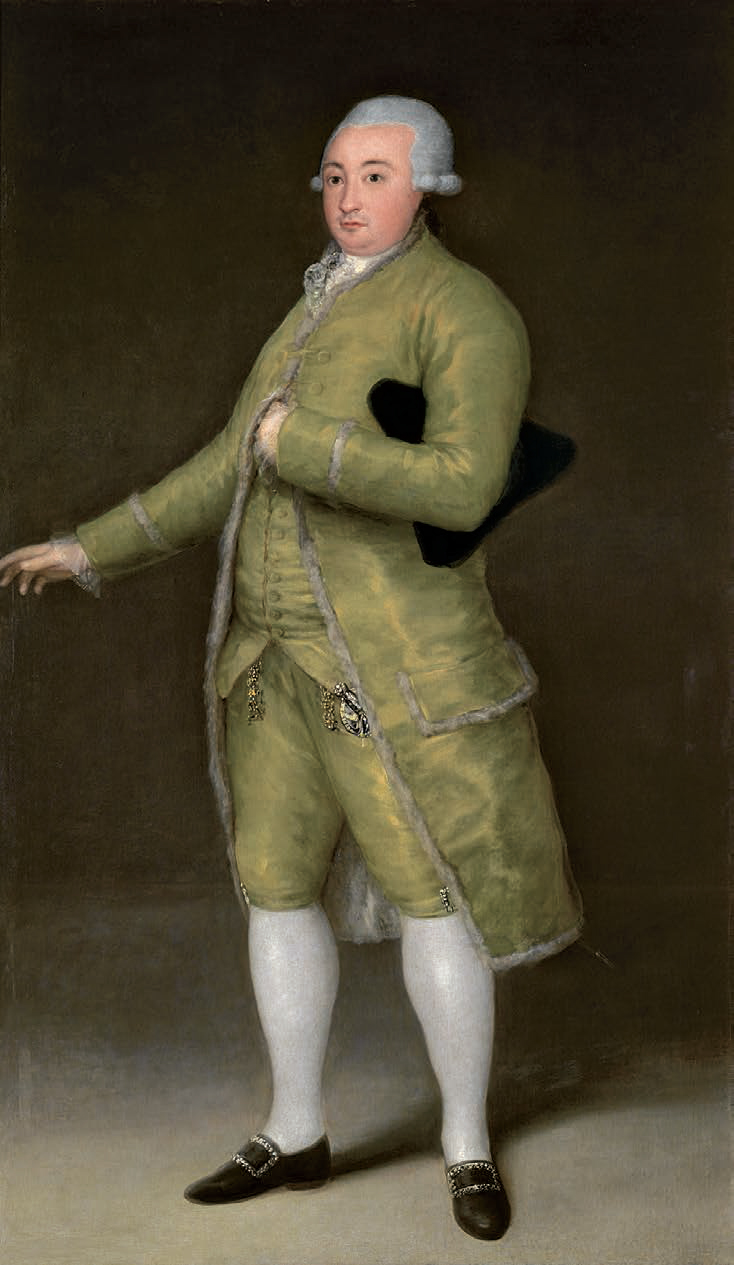
9 – 1788

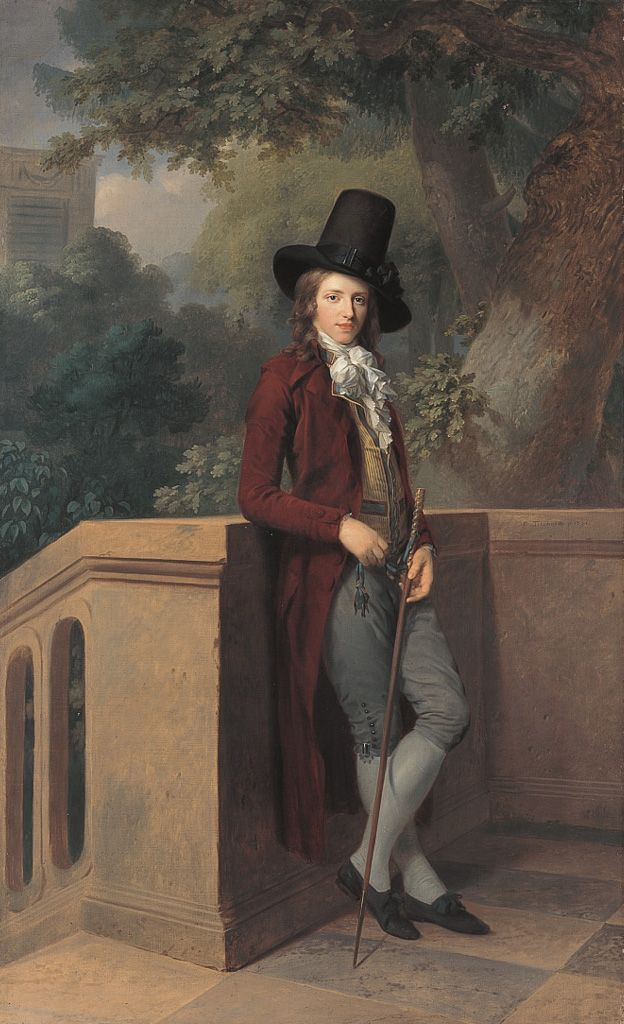
10 – 1791

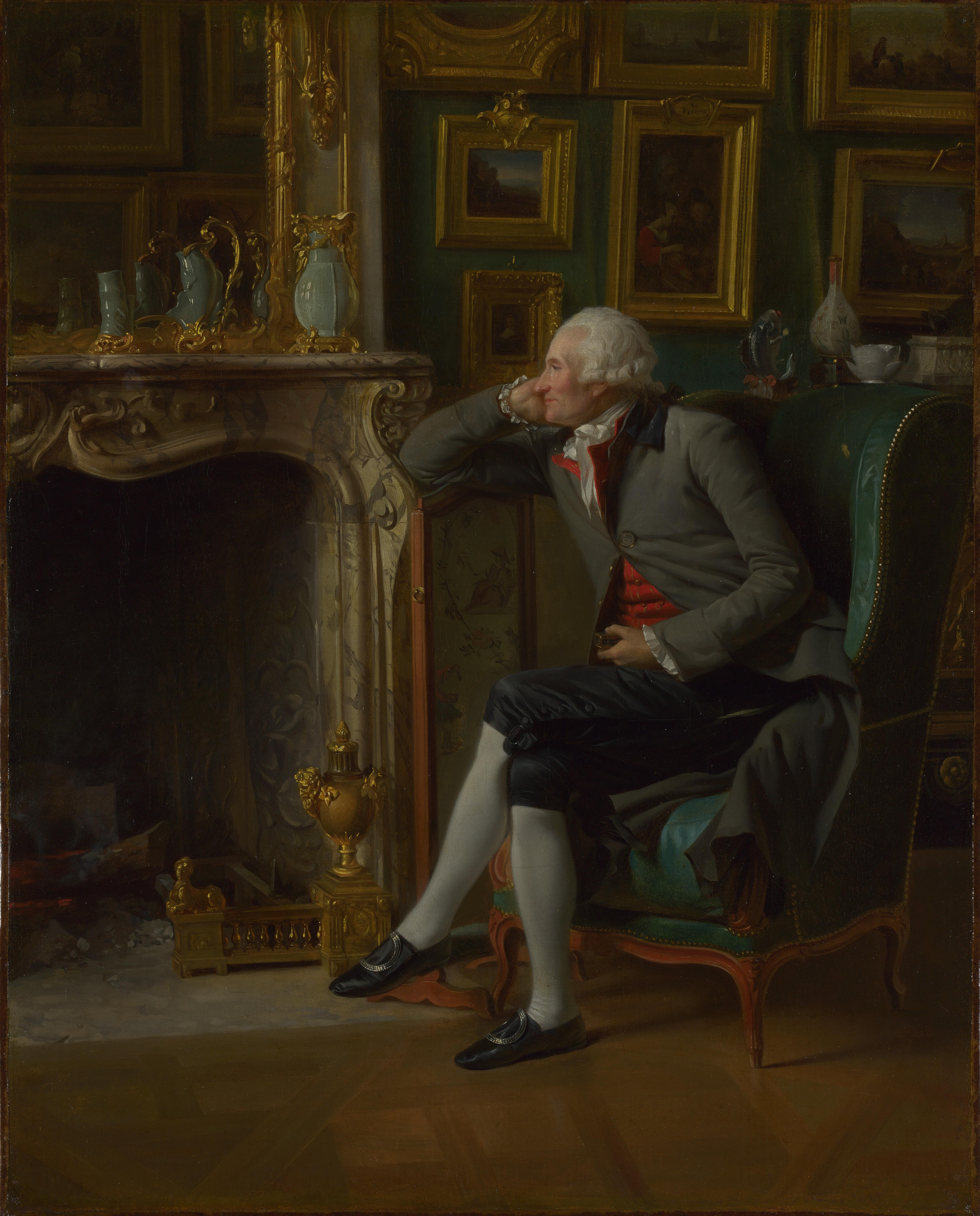
11 – c. 1791

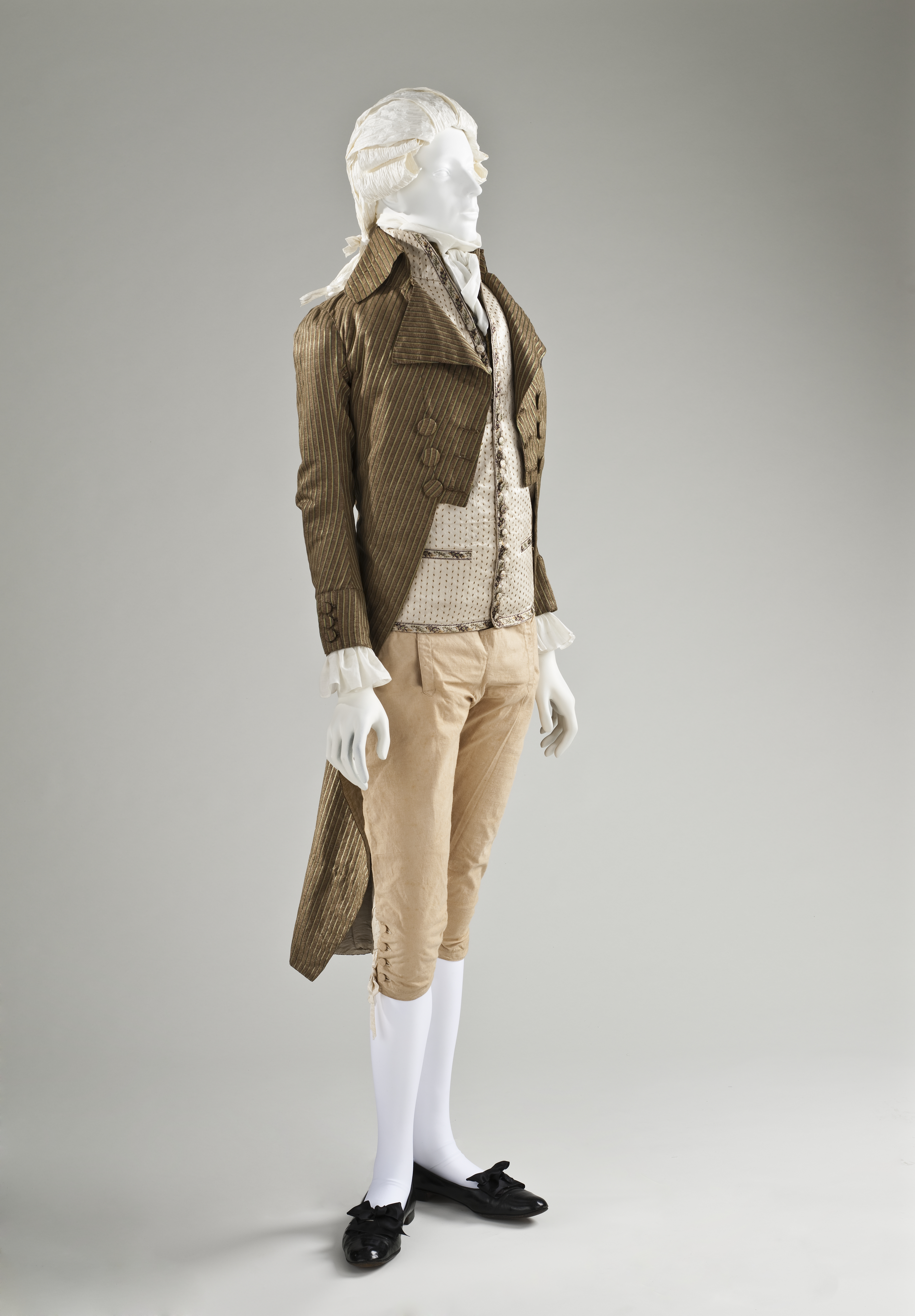
12 - 1790–95

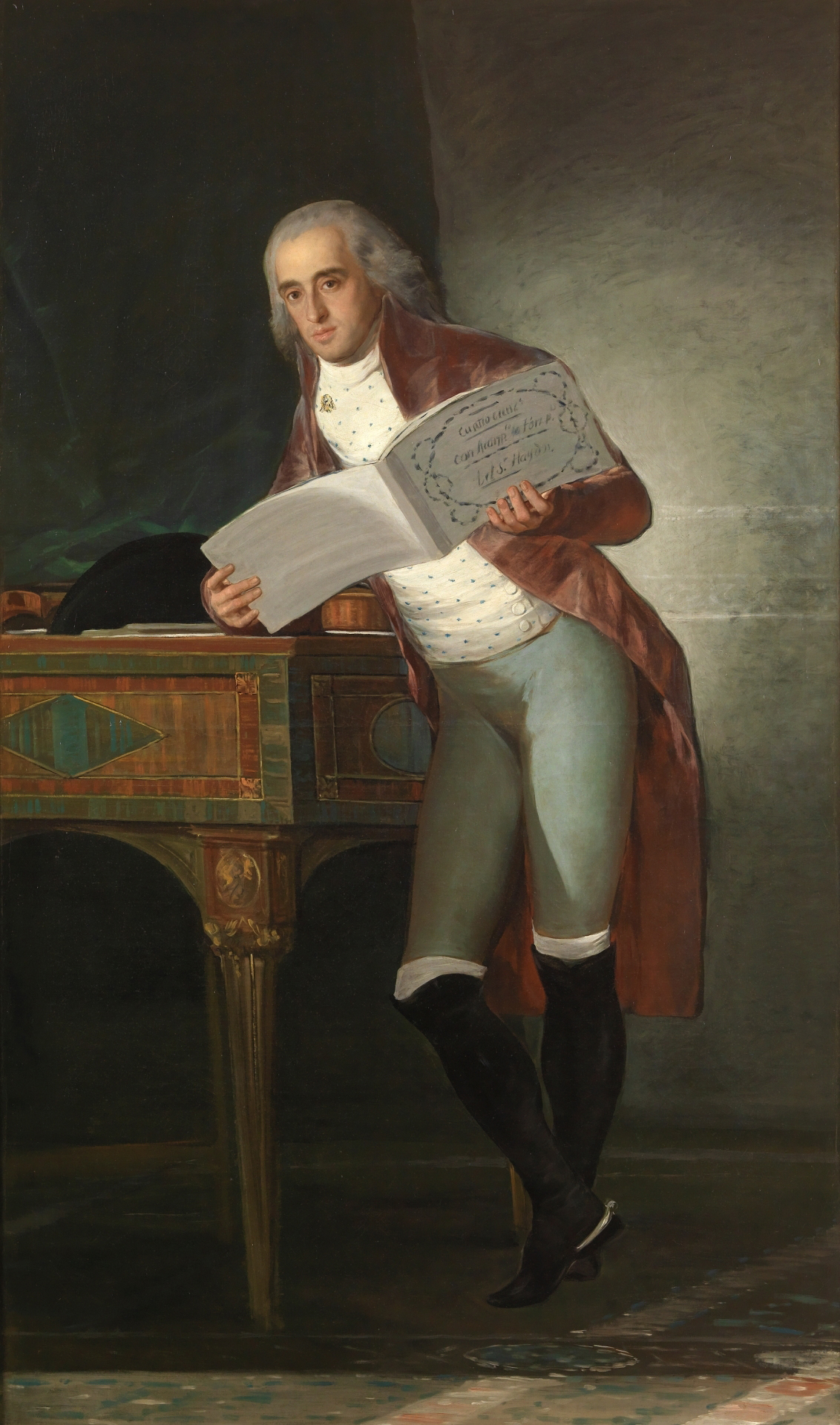
13 – 1795

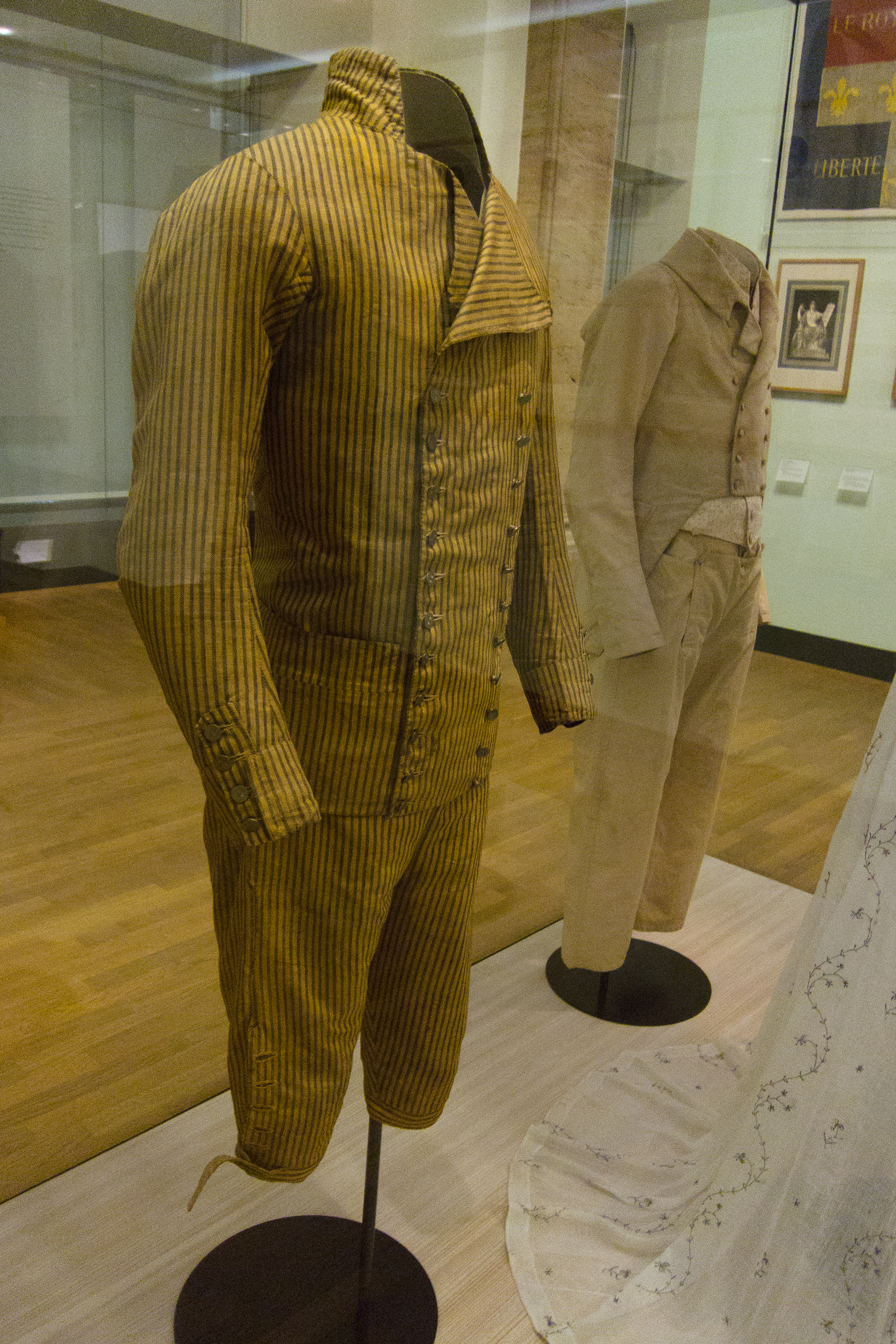
14 - 1790s

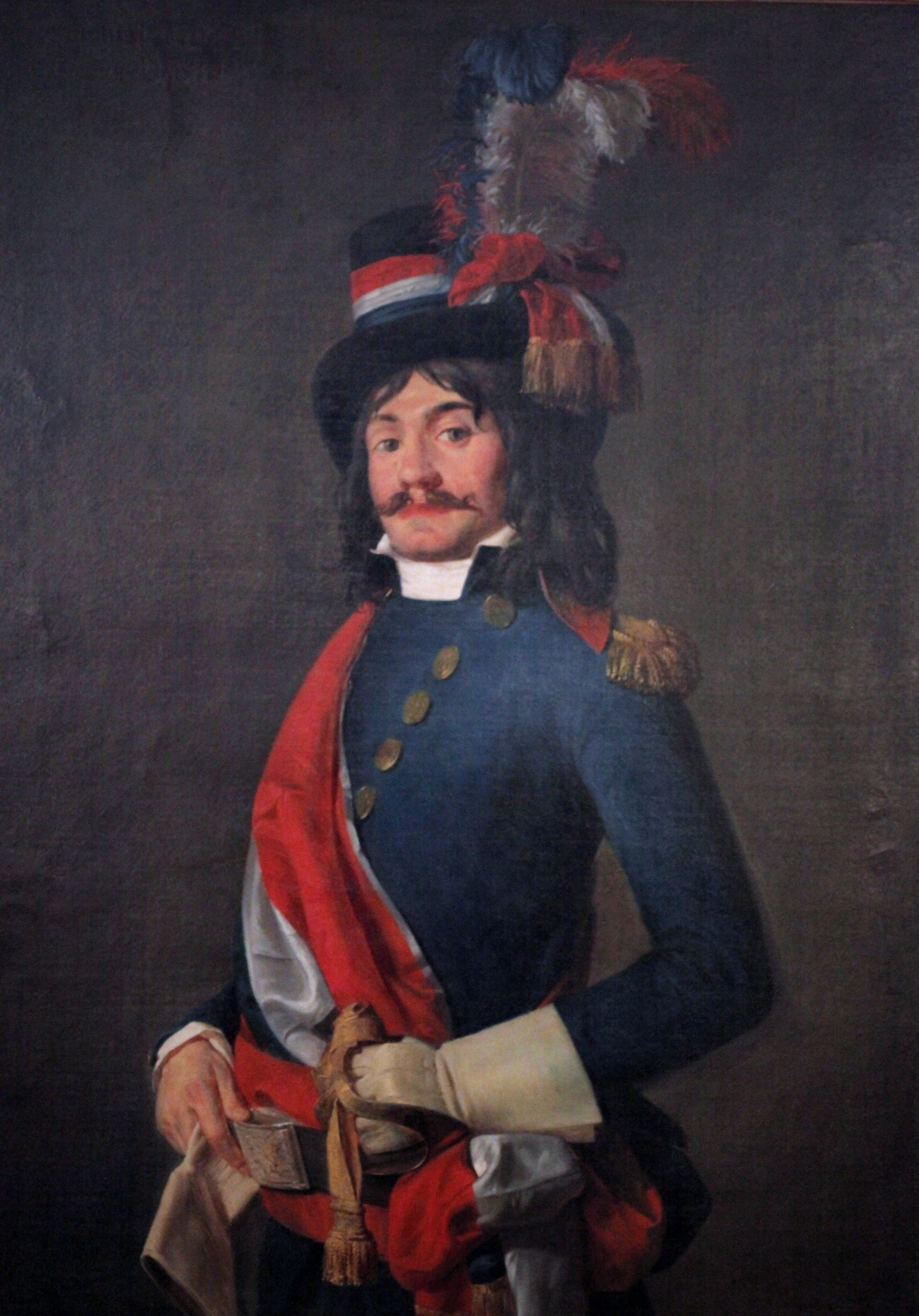
15 - 1793

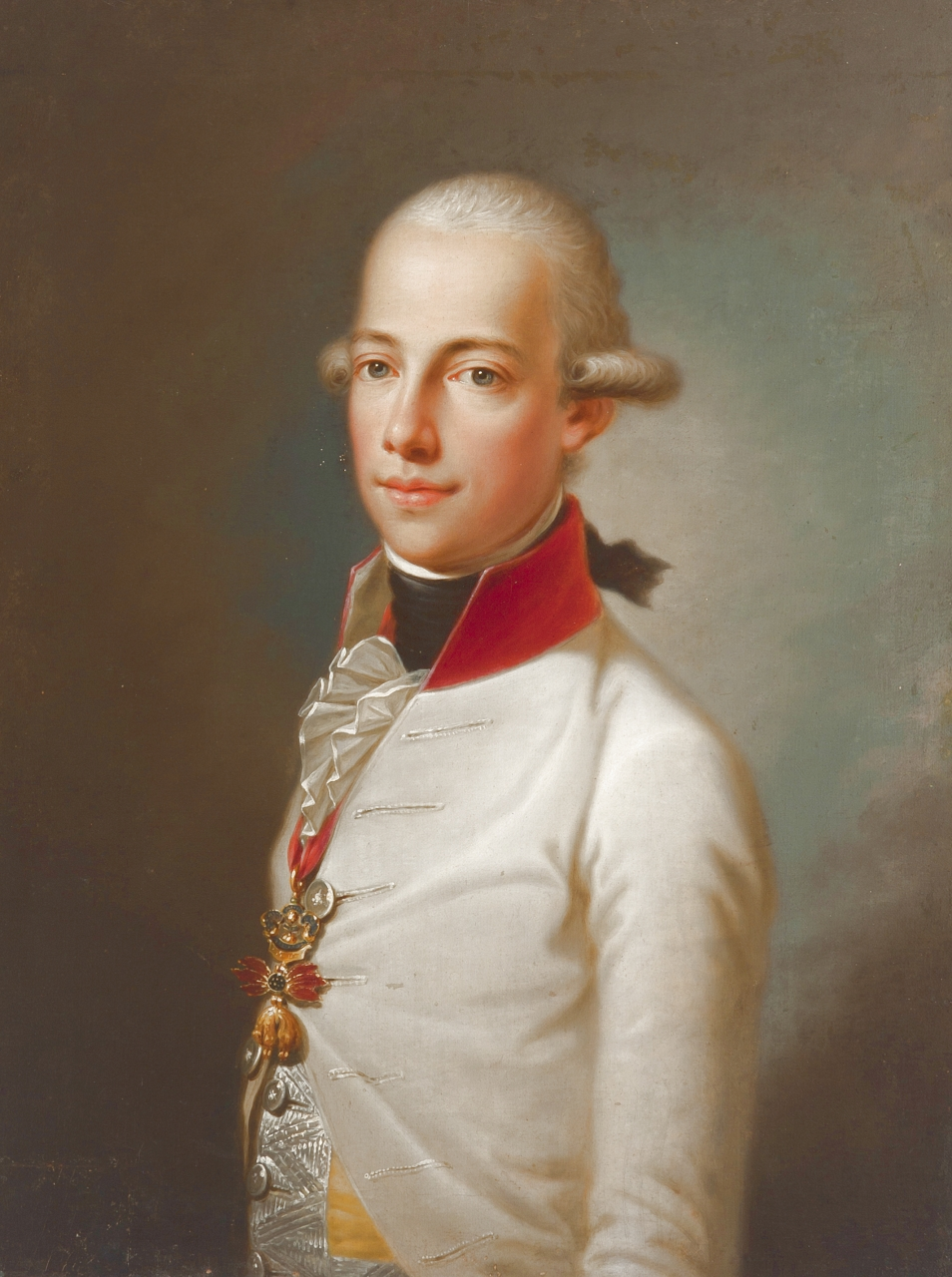
16 - c. 1795
1. Paul Revere's shirt has full sleeves with gathers at shoulder and cuff, plain wristbands, and a small turnover collar.
2. Naturalists Johann Reinhold Forster and his son Georg Forster wear collared frock coats and open shirt collars for sketching. The portrait depicts them in Tahiti, 1775–80.
3. Celadon colored silk coat, waistcoat and breeches, 1777
4. Captain James Cook in naval uniform, c. 1780
5. Another portrait of Georg Forster depicts him in a collarless dress coat and matching waistcoat with covered buttons, c. 1785. His shirt has a pleated frill at the front opening and his hair is powdered, c. 1785.
6. Yellow wool suit with silk velvet trim shows the influence of English tailoring on European fashion. Spain, c. 1785, Los Angeles County Museum of Art, M.2007.211.801a-c.
7. Royal Navy officer and Governor of New South Wales, Arthur Phillip in naval uniform, including bicorn hat, 1786
8. 1780s suit of matching coat, waistcoat and breeches. The waistcoat is hip length, 1780s.
9. Francisco Cabarrús holds the popular tricorne and wears a yellow-mustard suit of matching coat, waistcoat and breeches; the waistcoat is hip length, 1788.
10. Nicolas Châtelain wears a tall, slightly conical hat, a predecessor of the top hat, 1791.
11. Baron de Besenval wears a short patterned red waistcoat with his grey coat and black satin breeches. His coat has a dark contrasting collar, and his linen shirt has plain fabric ruffles, Paris, 1791.
12. French fashions of 1790–95 include a tailcoat of silk and cotton plain weave with silk satin stripes, shown over two layered figured silk vests. (Los Angeles County Museum of Art)
13. The Duke of Alba, 1795, a portrait by Francisco de Goya, who depicts this nobleman wearing plain colors in the newly fashionable English style, although the duke still powders his hair. He is wearing long riding boots that reach the breeches.
14. Relatively plain men's suits from 1790s France. In the aftermath of the French Revolution, excessively ornamental styles were abandoned in favour of simple designs.
15. French Revolutionary style, 1793: Édouard Jean Baptiste Milhaud, deputy of the Convention, in his uniform of representative of the People to the Armies, by Jean-François Garneray or another follower of Jacques-Louis David.
16. Archduke John of Austria, the latest-born notable person to be portrayed wearing a powdered wig tied in a queue, c. 1795.

==== Caricature ====
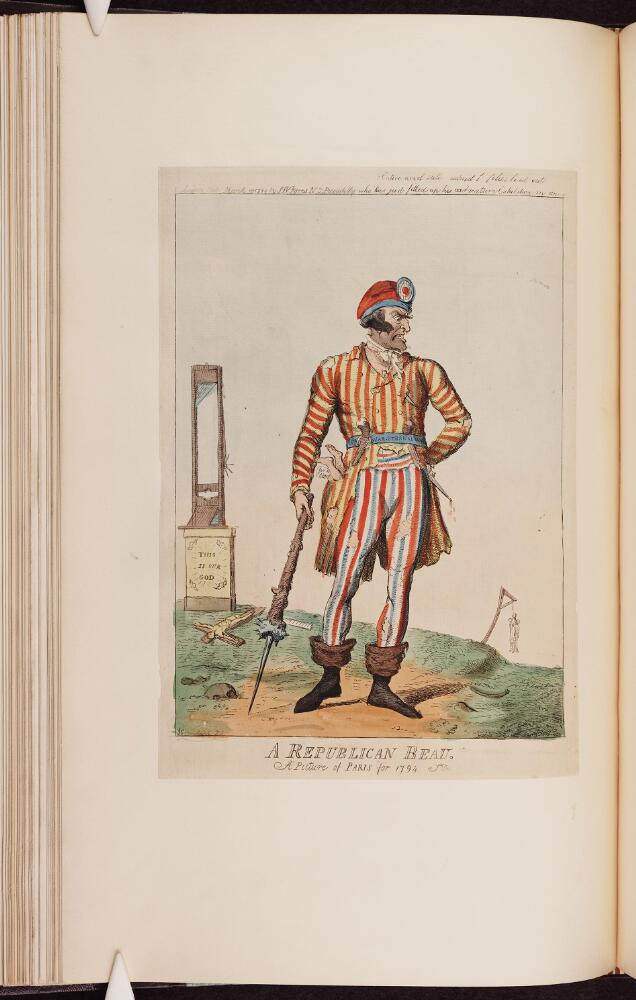
Isaac Cruikshank's caricature of a French revolutionary (1794), emphasizing striped clothing and a Phrygian cap.

== Children's fashion ==
In the late 18th century, new philosophies of child-rearing led to clothes that were thought especially suitable for children. Toddlers wore washable dresses called frocks of linen or cotton. British and American boys after perhaps three began to wear rather short pantaloons and short jackets, and for very young boys the skeleton suit was introduced. These gave the first real alternative to boys' dresses, and became fashionable across Europe.

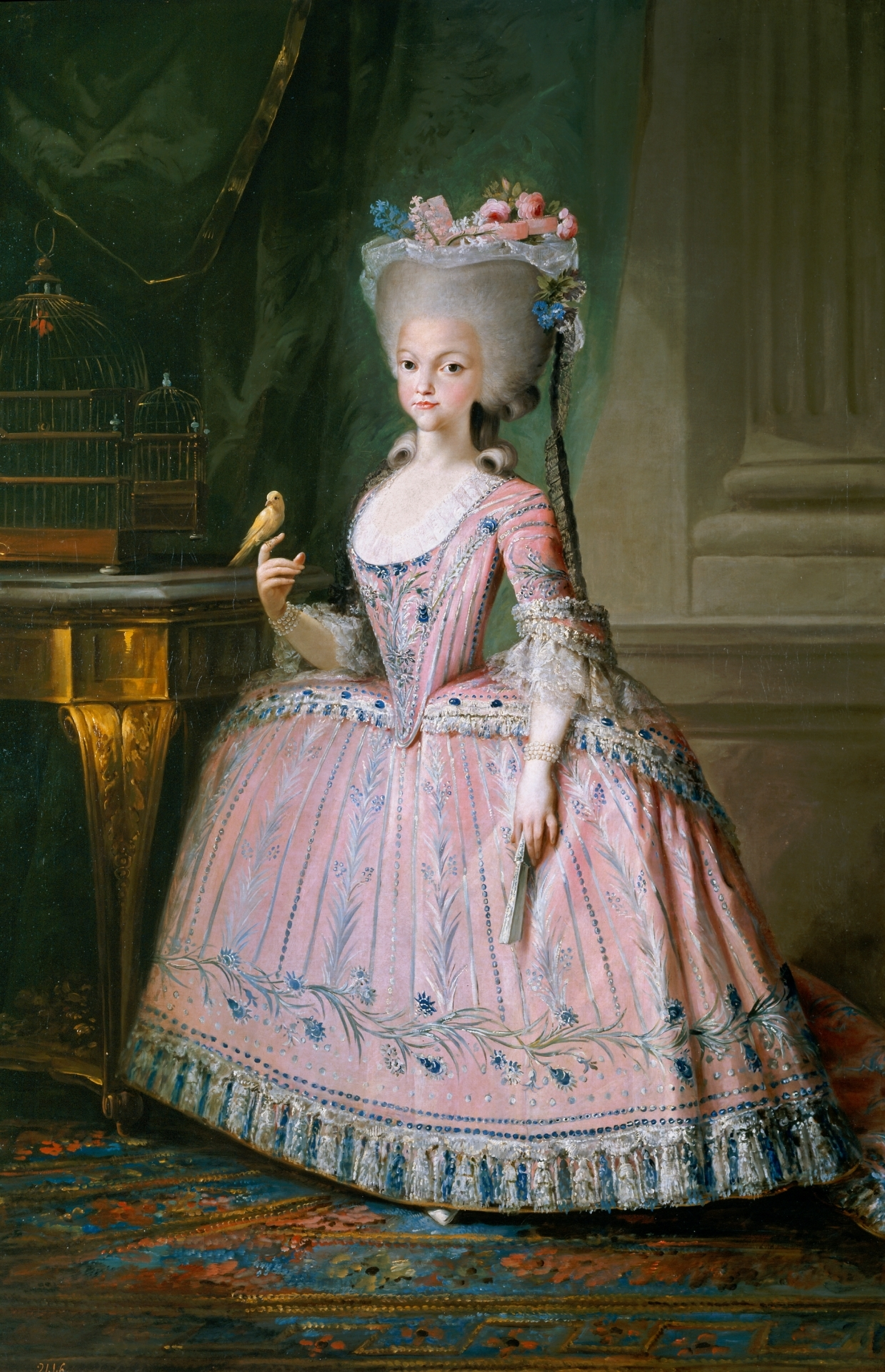
1 – 1775–1778

2 – 1775

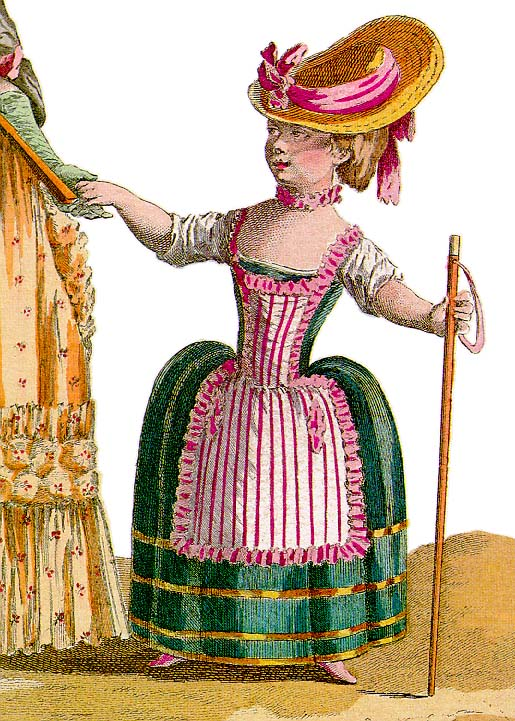
3 – 1778

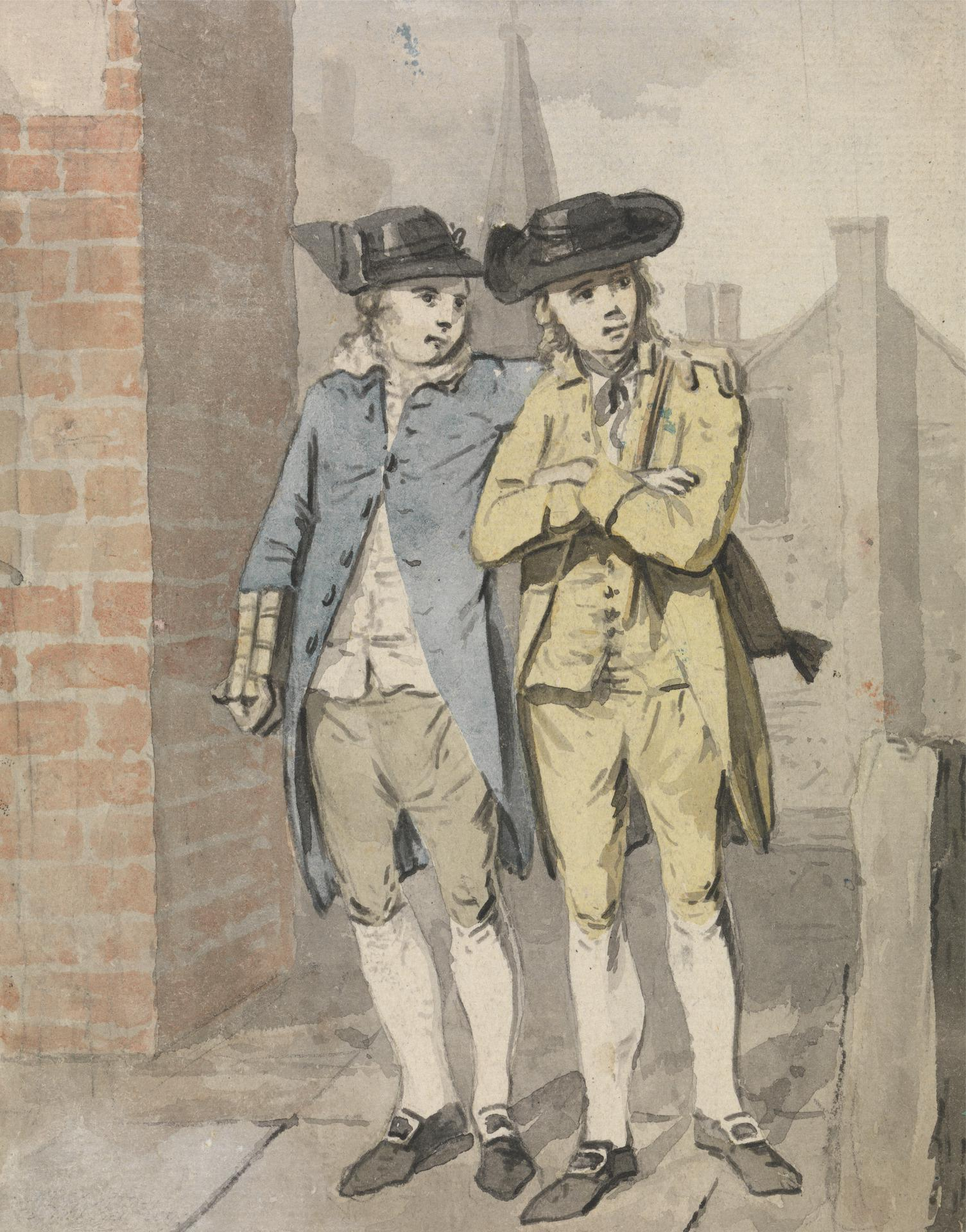
4 – ca 1780

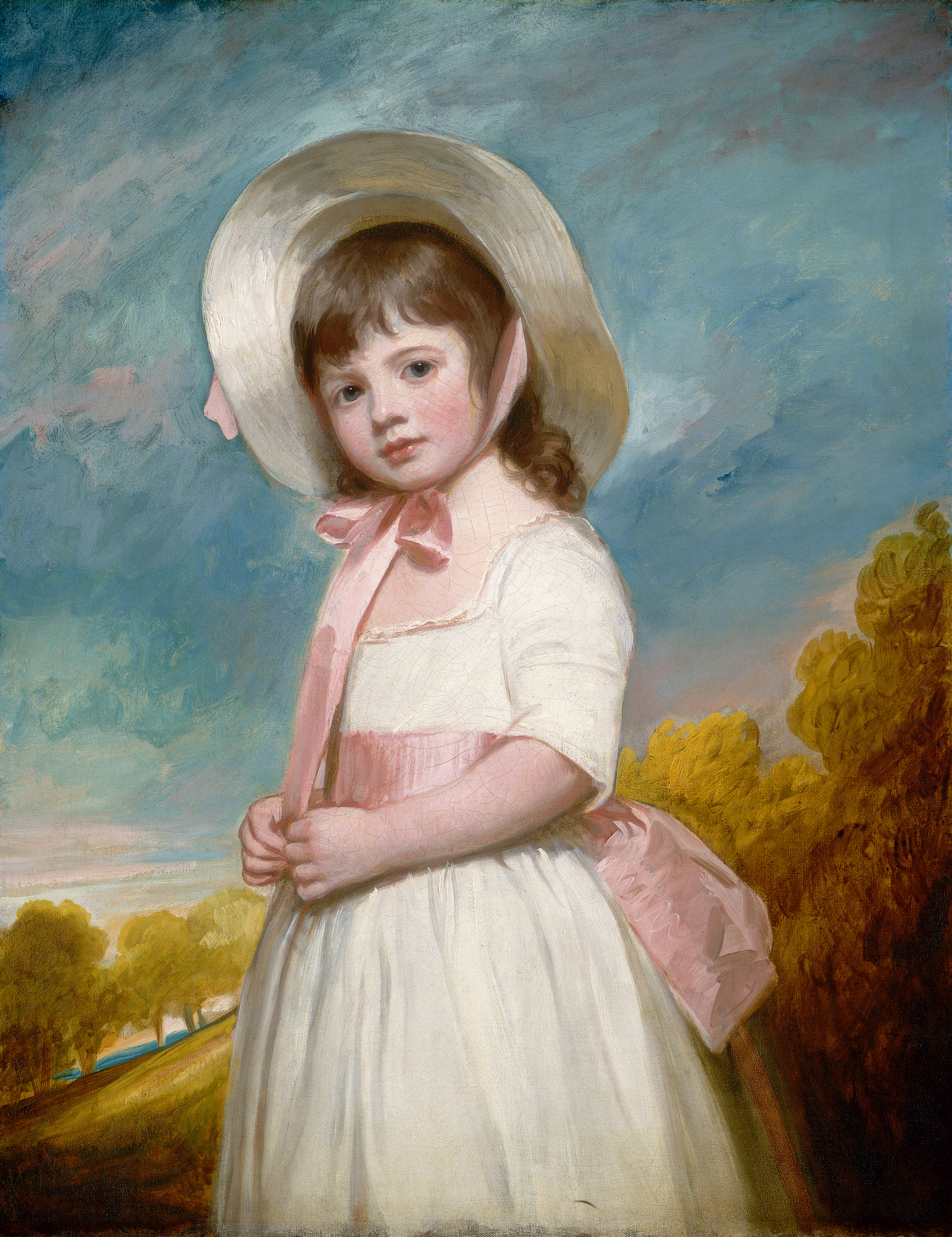
5 – 1781–83

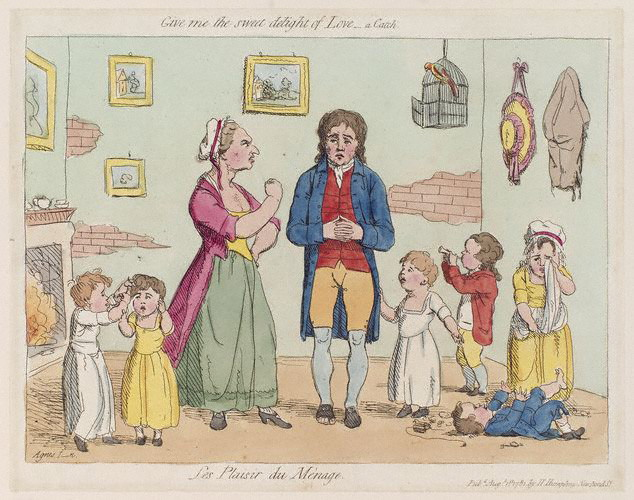
6 – 1781

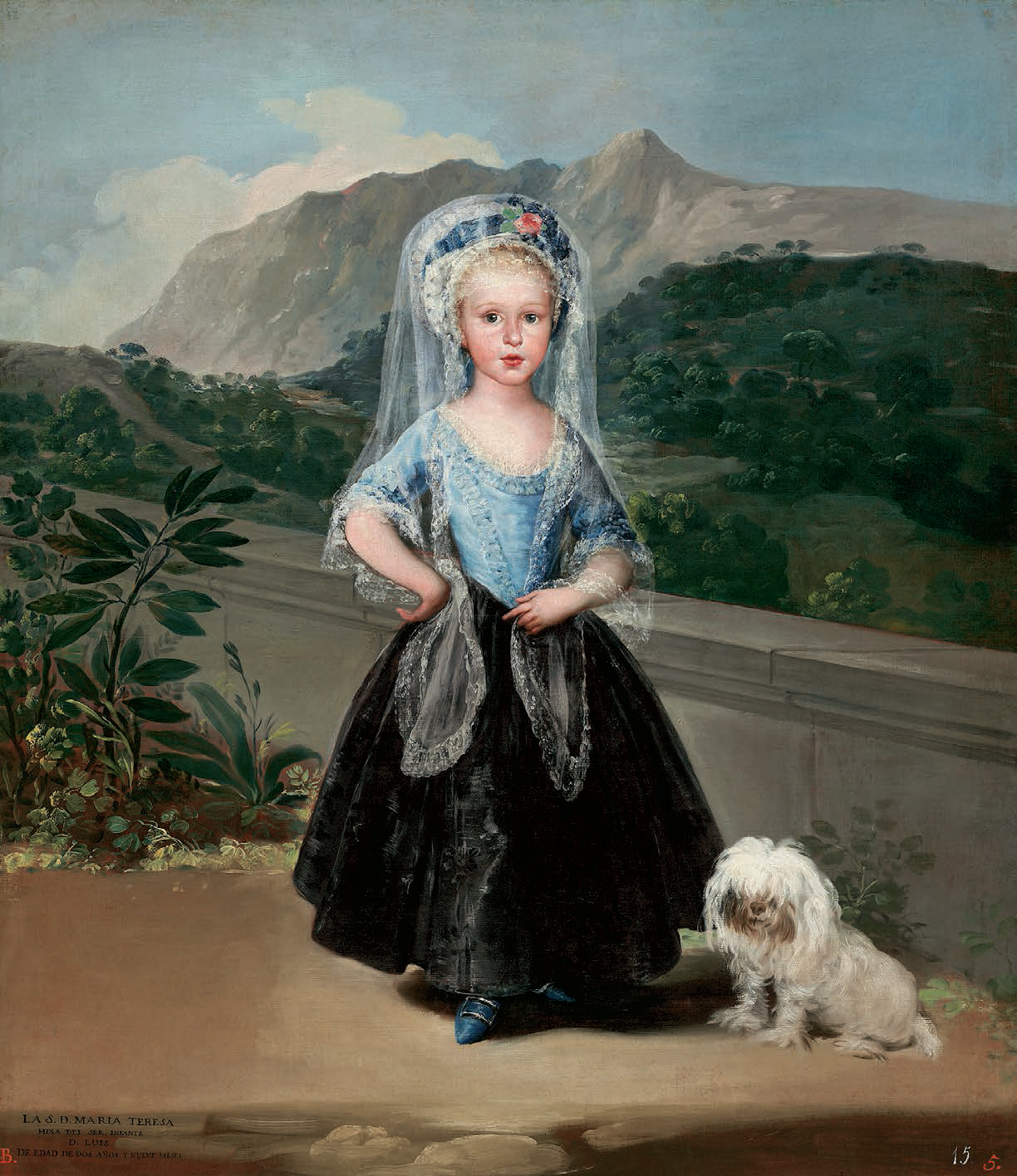
7 – 1783

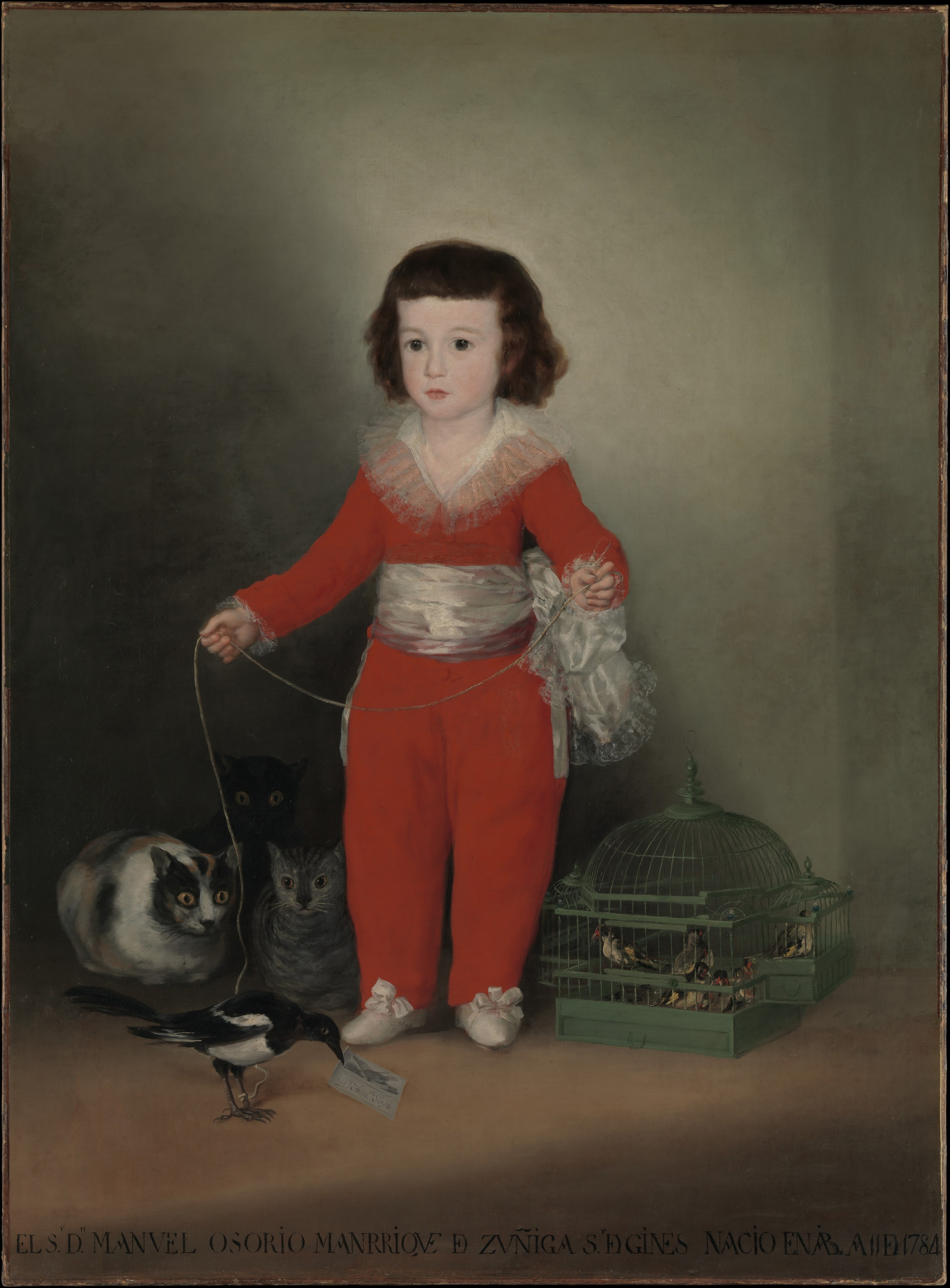
8 – 1784

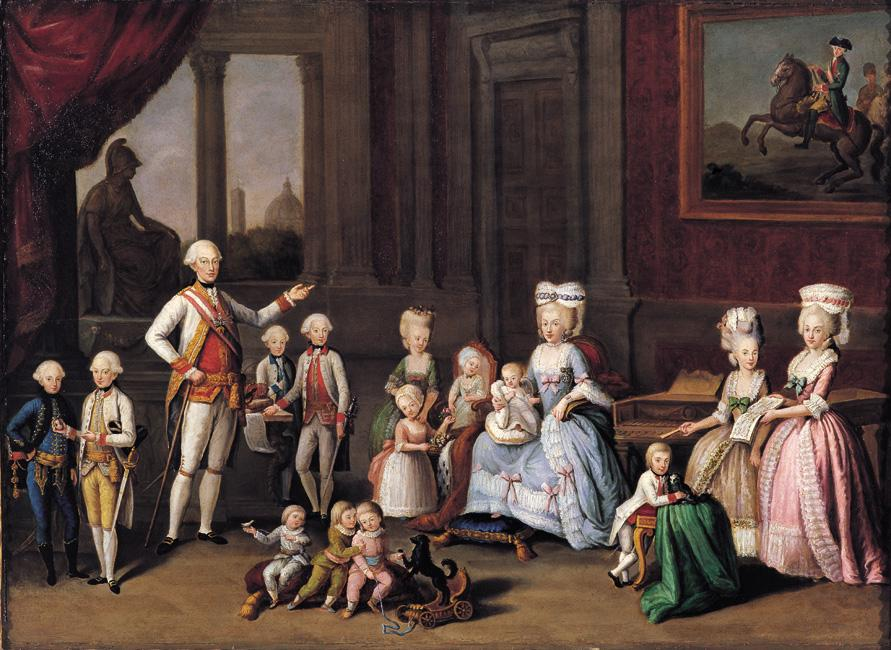
9 - 1784–85

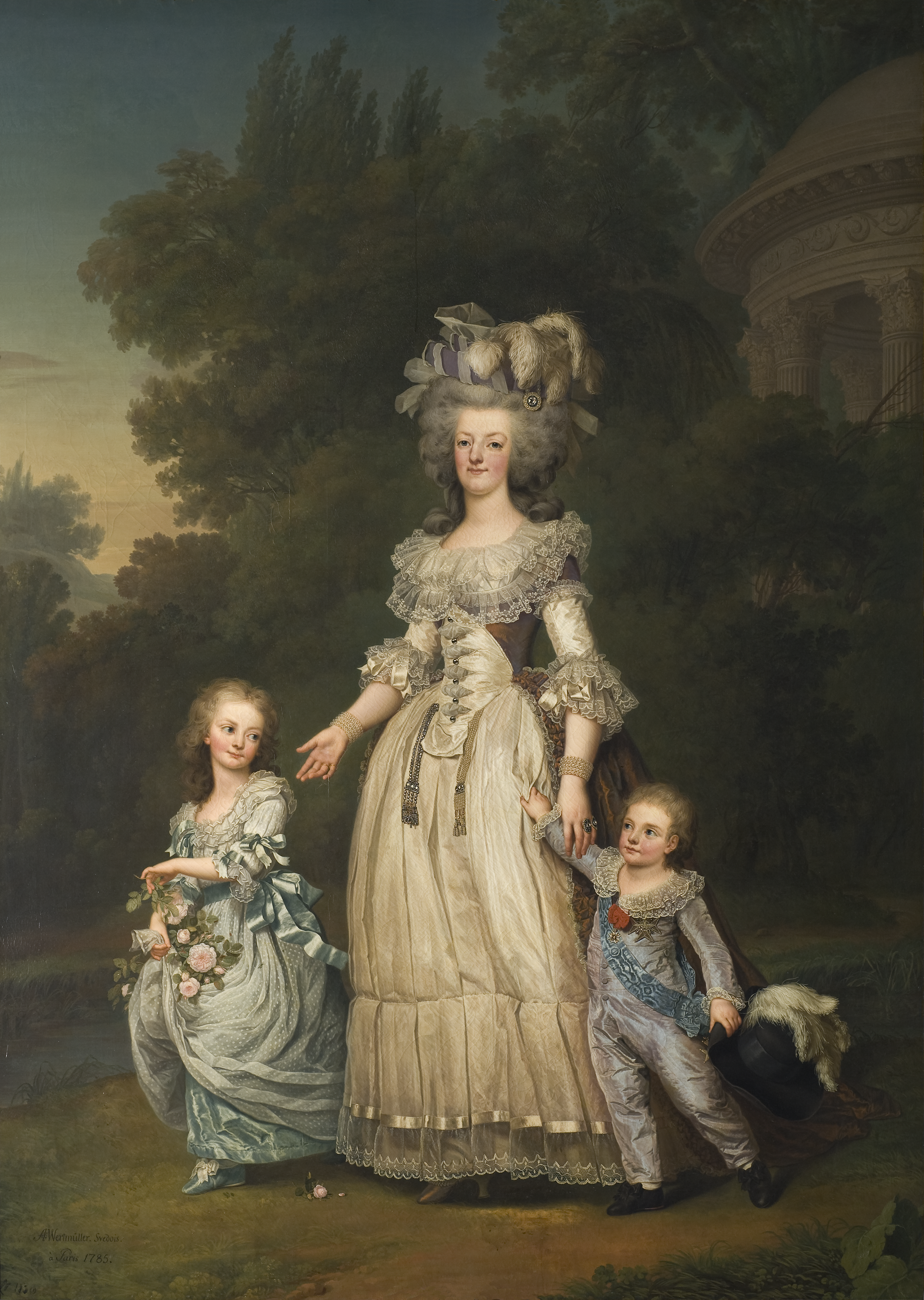
10 – 1785–86

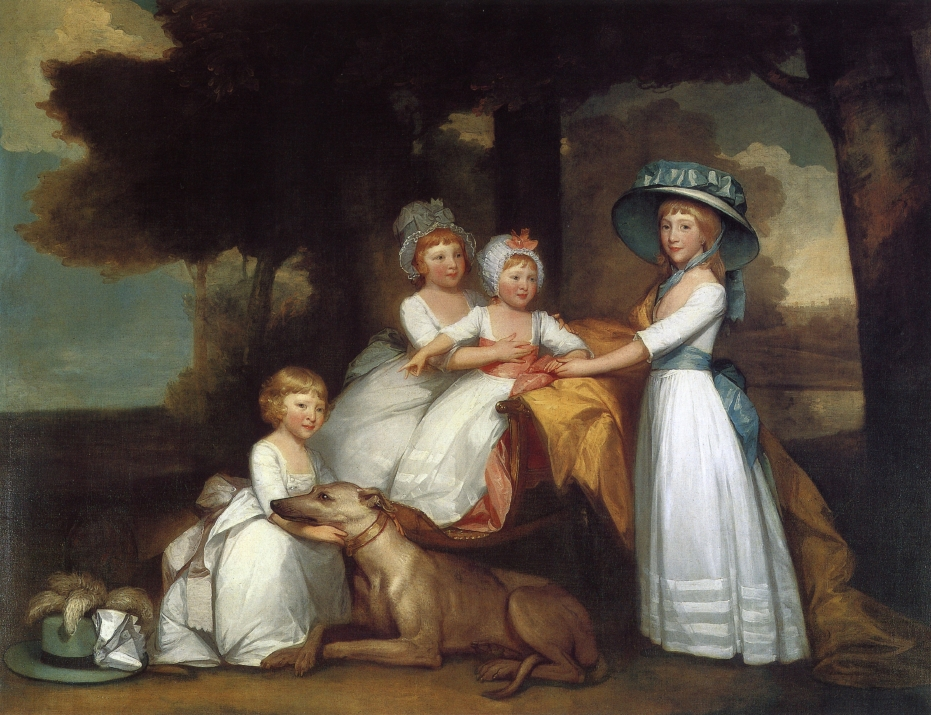
11 – 1787

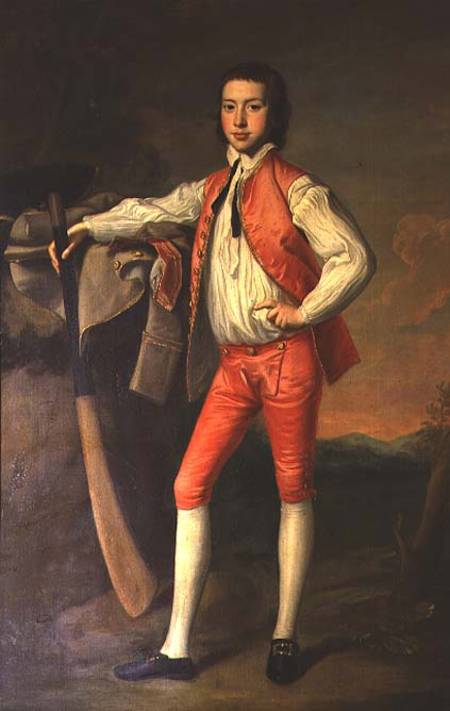
12 – c. 1790
1. Queen Charlotte of Portugal as a child, effectively in adult court dress.
2. Baby dress made 1775 for a child of Hedvig Elisabeth Charlotte of Holstein-Gottorp.
3. The cumbersome outfit of the young daughter of a French bourgeois, 1778.
4. Schools boys ca 1780.
5. Miss Willoughby wears the loose, sashed white frock that is the English girl's equivalent of the fashionable lady's chemise dress, with a straw hat, 1781–83.
6. Everyday clothes of young children in a middle-class family, 1781.
7. Spanish girl María Teresa de Borbón in a blue bodice, black skirt, and a mobcap with a veil, 1783.
8. Spanish boy in an early skeleton suit with a round frilled collar and waist sash, 1784.
9. The family of Leopoldo I, Grand Duke of Tuscany and Maria Luisa of Spain, 1784–85.
10. Marie Antoinette and her children on a 1785–1786 portrait, showing the change to loose ankle-length skirts for little girls. Her son wears a light blue skeleton suit.
11. The children of Hugh Percy, 2nd Duke of Northumberland wear loose white frocks with cloth belts. The younger girls wear mobcaps and the older girls wear fashionable hats, 1787.
12. Young William Fitzherbert wears fall-front breeches, a full shirt, and a narrow black stock, c. 1790.

== Working-class clothing ==
Working-class people in 18th-century England and the United States often wore the same garments as fashionable people: shirts, waistcoats, coats and breeches for men, and shifts, petticoats, and dresses or jackets for women. However, they owned fewer clothes, which were made of cheaper and sturdier fabrics. Working-class men also wore short jackets, and some (especially sailors) wore trousers rather than breeches. Smock-frocks were a regional style for men, especially shepherds. Country women wore short hooded cloaks, most often red. Both sexes wore handkerchiefs or neckerchiefs.

Men's felt hats were worn with the brims flat rather than cocked or turned up. Men and women wore shoes with shoe buckles (when they could afford them). Men who worked with horses wore boots.

During the French Revolution, men's costume became particularly emblematic of the movement of the people and the upheaval of the aristocratic French society. It was the long pant, hemmed near the ankles, that displaced the knee-length breeches culottes that marked the aristocratic classes. Working-class men had worn long pants for much of their history, and the rejection of culottes became a symbol of working class, and later French, resentment of the Ancien Régime. The movement would be given the all-encompassing title of sans-culottes, wearing the same as the working class. There was no culotte "uniform" per se, but as they were turned into a larger symbol of French society, they had certain attributes attributed to them. In contemporary art and description, culottes become associated with the Phrygian cap a classical symbol. French citizens on all levels of society were obligated to wear the blue, white and red of the French flag on their clothing, often in the form of the pinned the blue-and-red cockade of Paris onto the white cockade of the Ancien Régime, thus producing the original cockade of France. Later, distinctive colours and styles of cockade would indicate the wearer's faction although the meanings of the various styles were not entirely consistent and varied somewhat by region and period.

In the 17th century, a cockade was pinned on the side of a man's tricorne or cocked hat, or on his lapel.

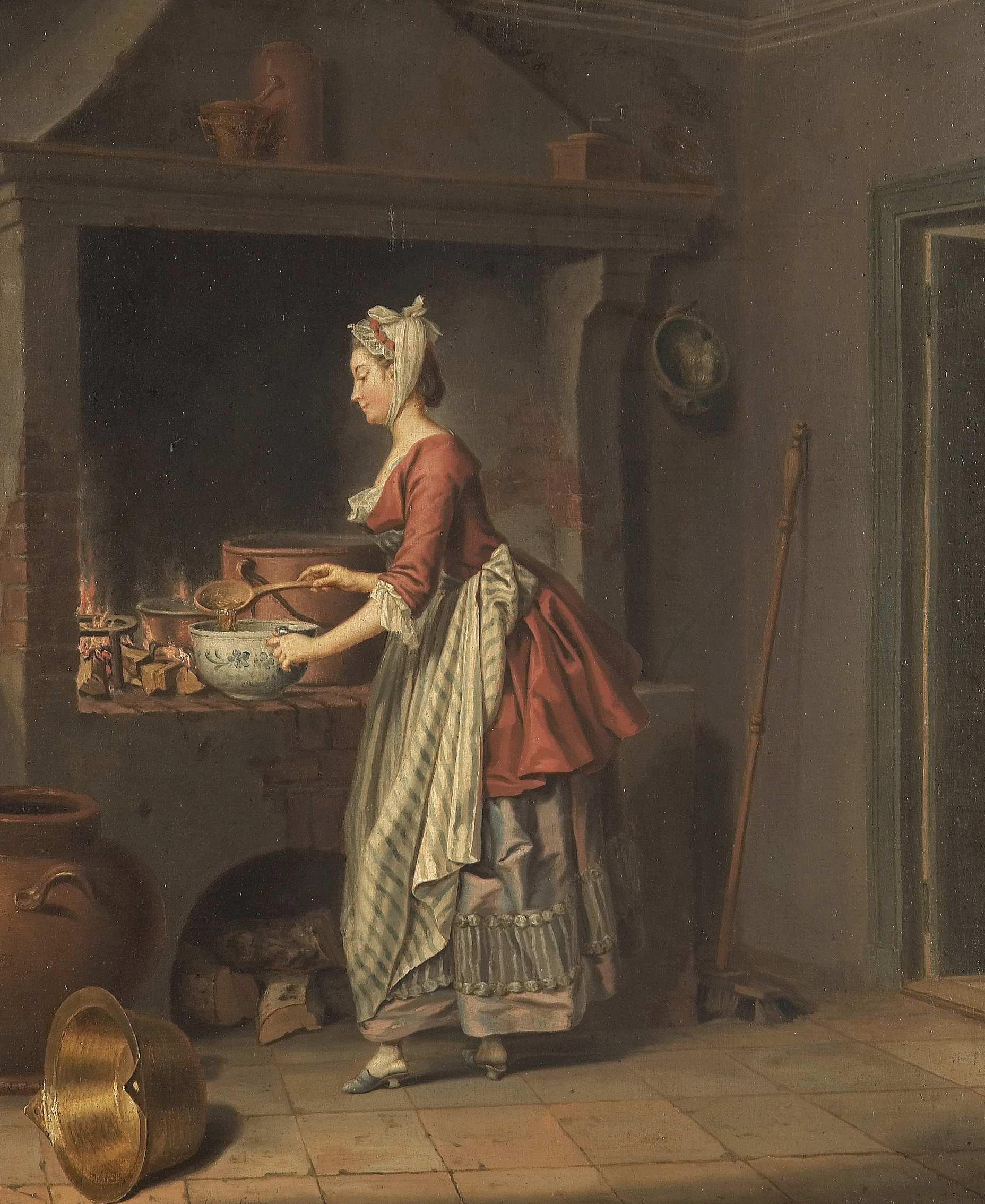
Sweden, c. 1780

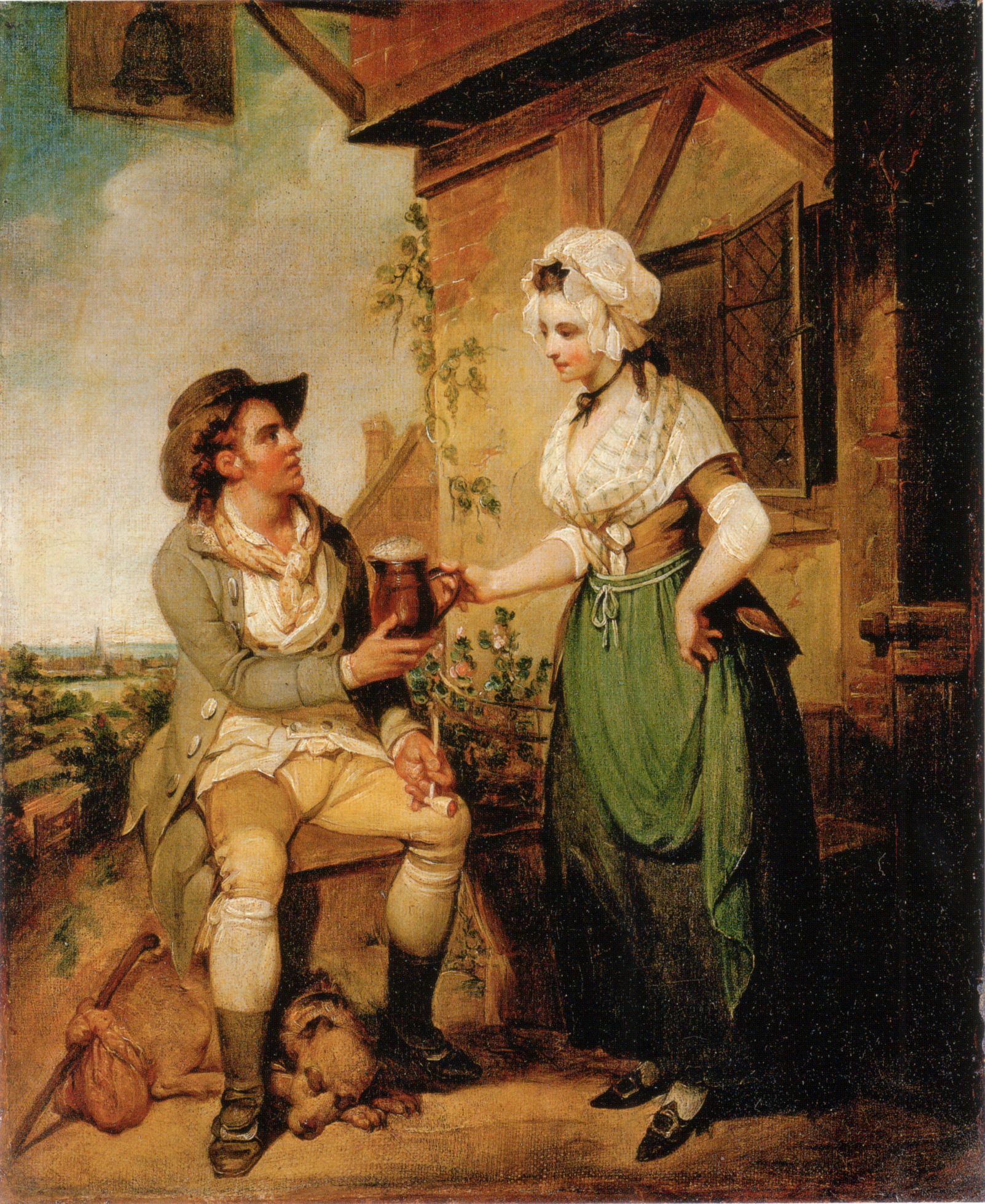
England, c. 1790

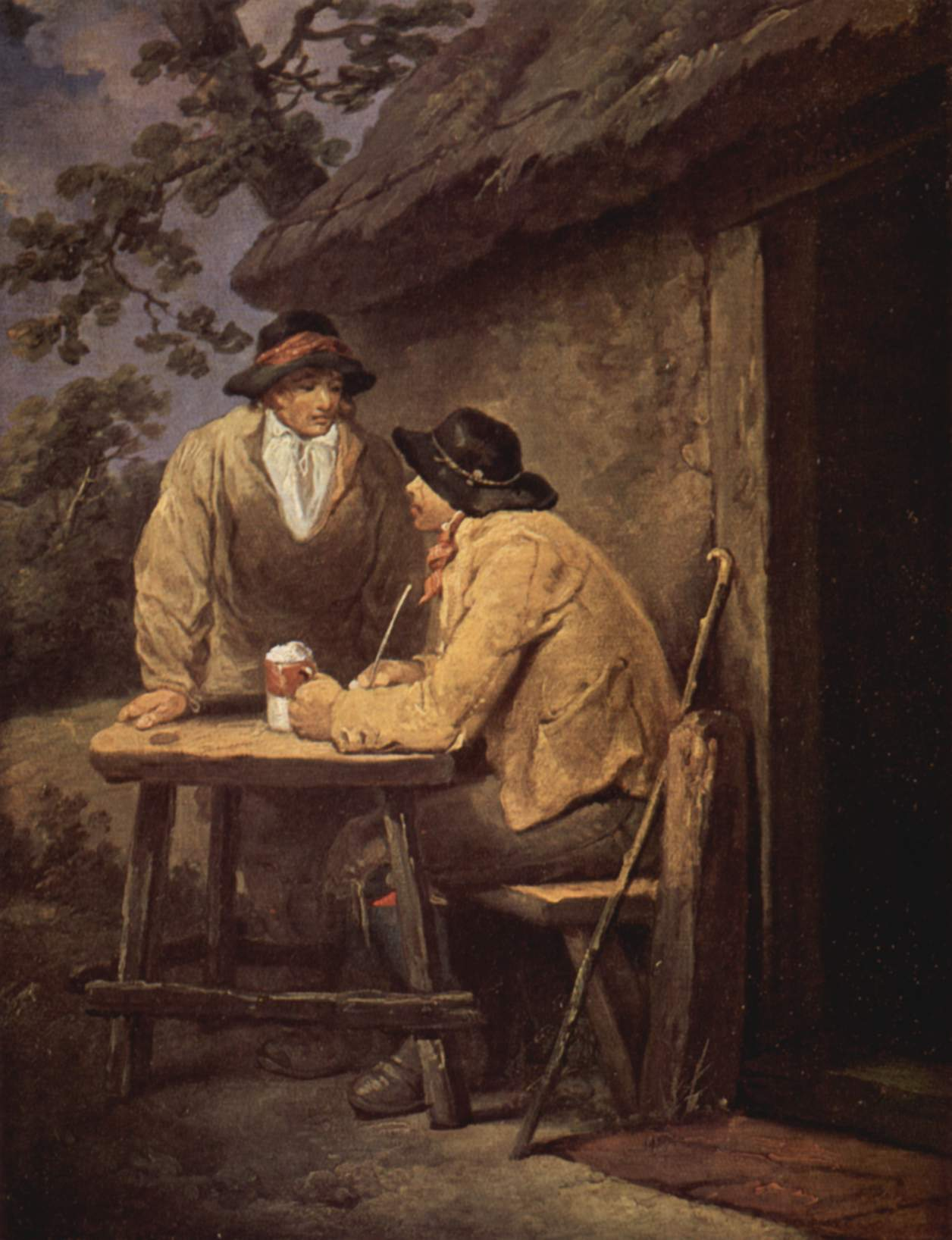
England, 1792

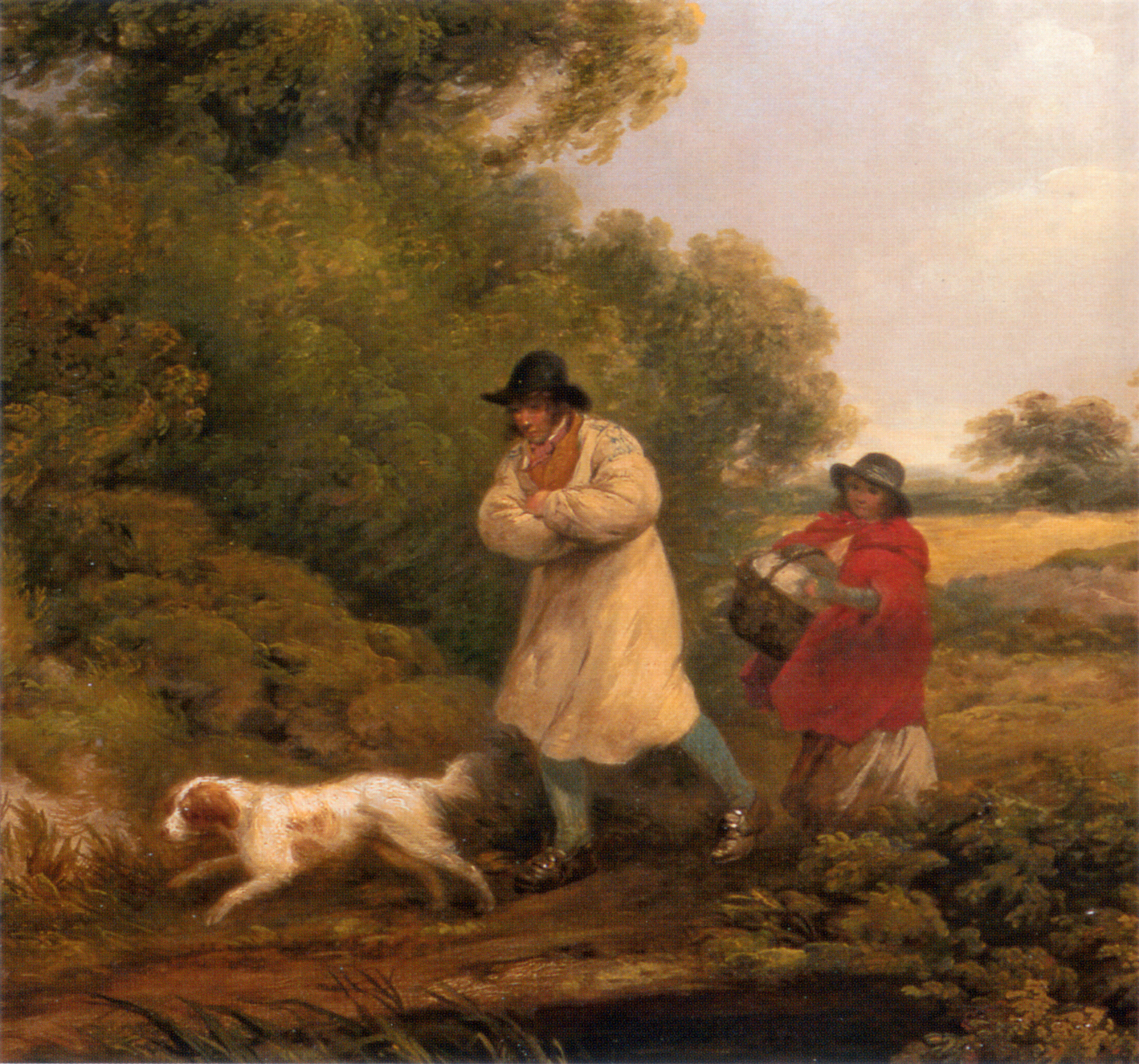
England, 1790s

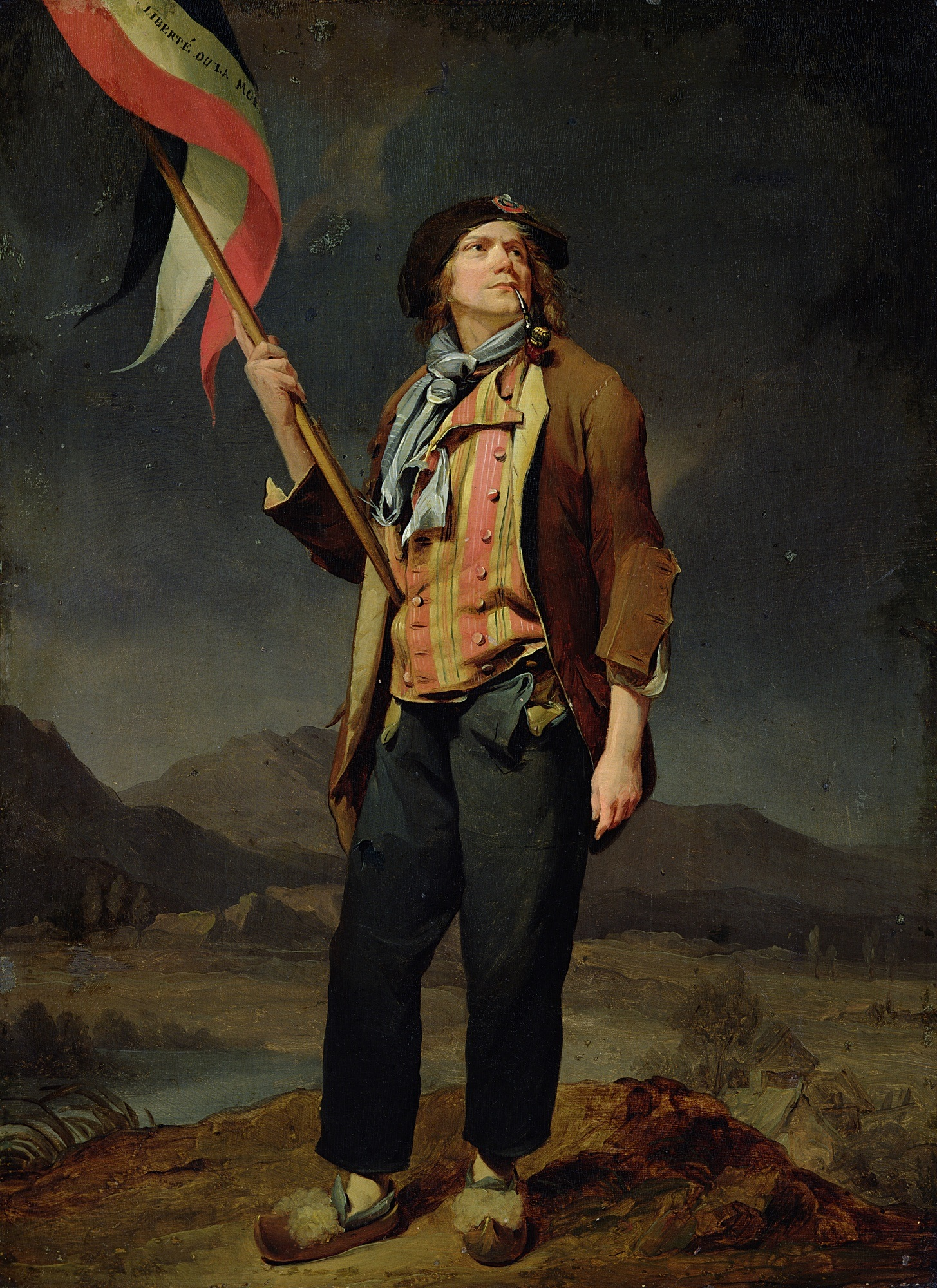
French sans-culotte, 1790s
1. A maid in a well-to-do household pours soup from a pot. She wears a caraco jacket over a petticoat together with a protective apron and high heeled shoes with curved heels, painted by Pehr Hilleström
2. Everyday day dress in England reflected fashionable styles. The man wears a coat with stylish large buttons over a double-breasted waistcoat and breeches. His hat brim is not cocked and he wears a spotted neckerchief. The woman wears a green apron over a skirted jacket and petticoat.
3. Two men at an alehouse wear felt hats. The man at the right wears a short jacket rather than a coat.
4. English countryman wears a round felt hat and a smock-frock. The countrywoman wears a short red cloak and a round hat over her cap, 1790s.
5. Idealized sans-culotte by Louis-Léopold Boilly

== Contemporary summaries of 18th-century fashion change ==
These two images provide 1790s views of the development of fashion during the 18th century (click on images for more information):

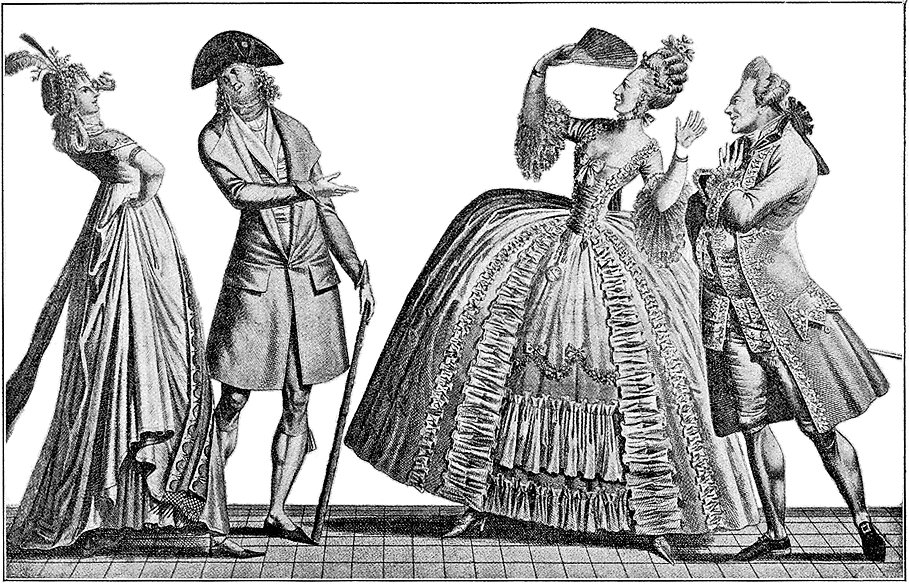
This caricature contrasts 1778 (at right) and 1793 (at left) styles for both men and women, showing the large changes in just 15 years

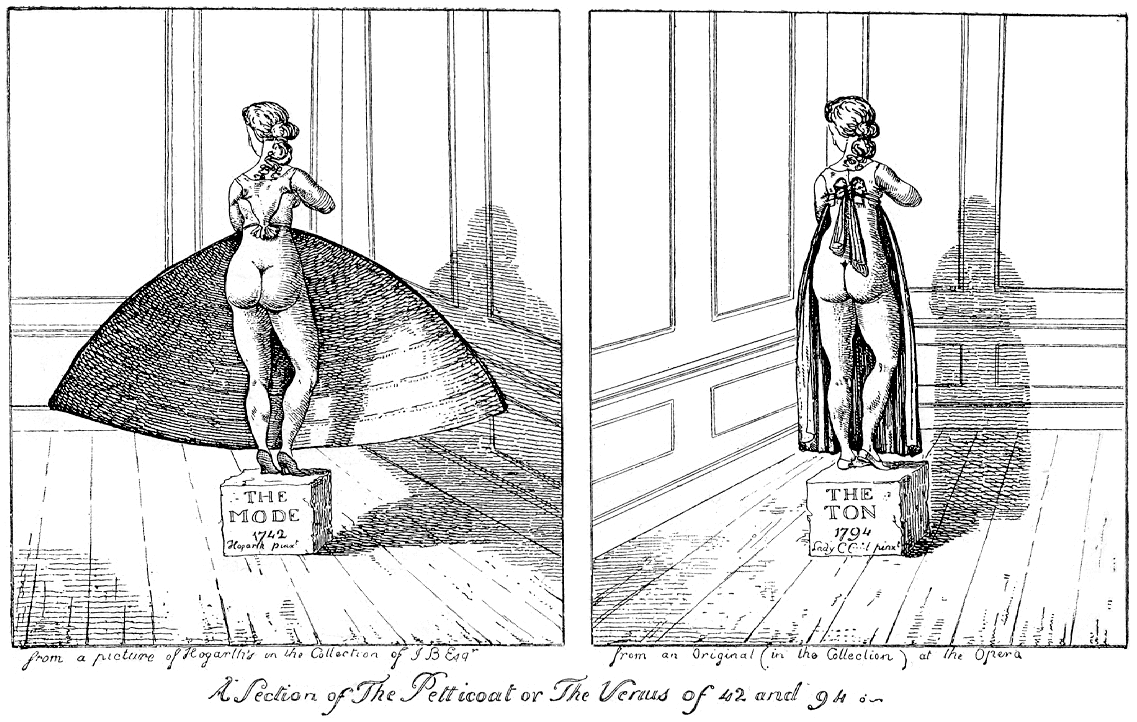
This caricature contrasts the hoop-skirts (and high-heeled shoes) of 1742 with the high-waisted narrow skirts (and flat shoes) of 1794
