= List of United States presidential firsts =

The following lists achievements and distinctions of various presidents of the United States. It includes distinctions achieved in their earlier life and post-presidencies. Due to some confusion surrounding sovereignty of nations during presidential visits, only nations that were independent, sovereign, or recognized by the United States during the presidency are listed here as a precedent.

== George Washington (1789–1797) ==
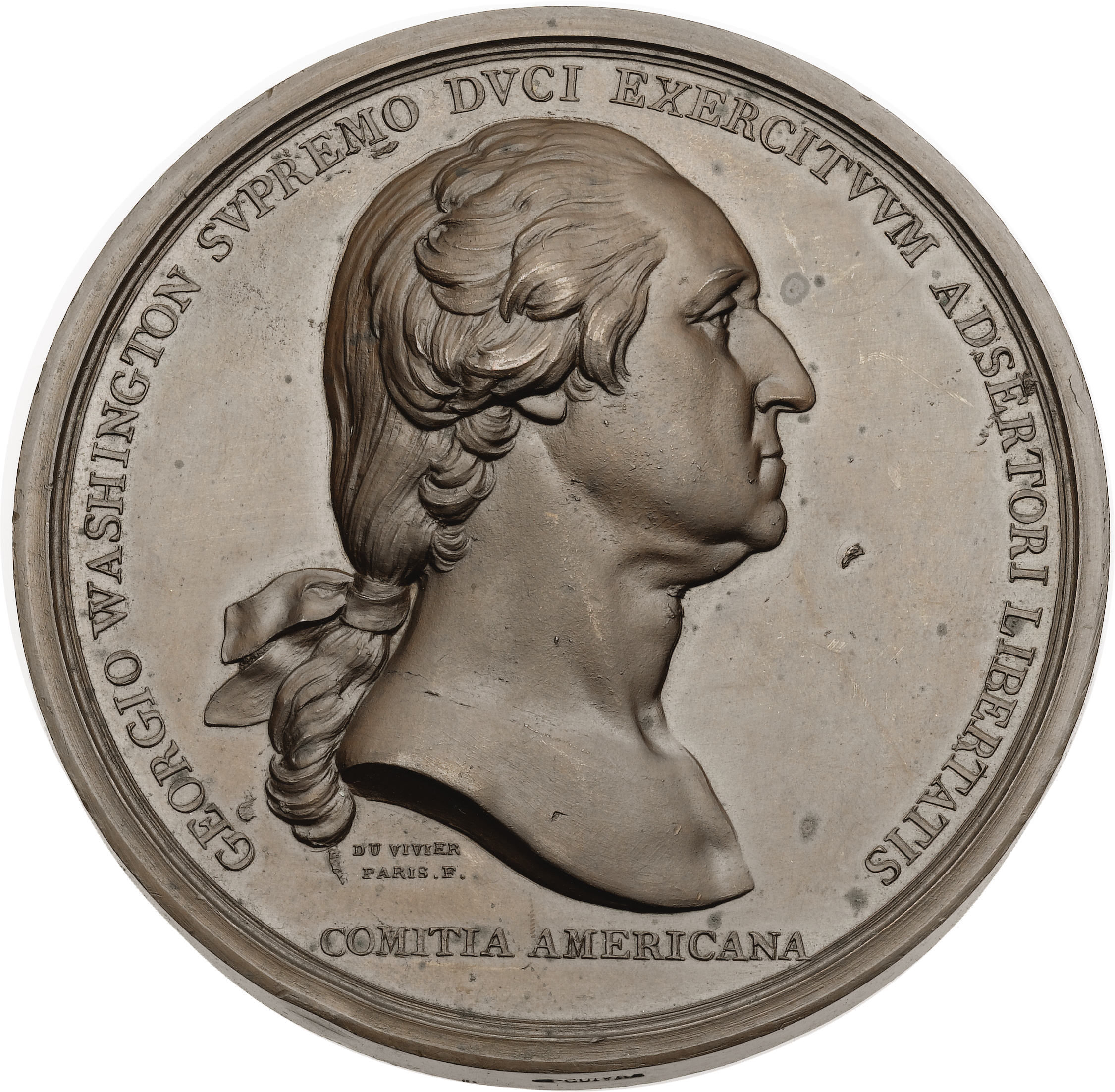
George Washington was awarded the Congressional Gold Medal in 1776, 13 years before becoming president.

- First president of the United States
- First president to have been born in the 18th century
- First president to have been a military veteran (Note: Colonel George Washington served in the French and Indian War, seeing action in the Braddock Expedition)
- First president to have served in the American Revolutionary War
- First president born in Virginia
- First president to be elected to a second term in office
- First president to own slaves
- First president to be an Episcopalian
- First president to be a Freemason
- First president to appear on a postage stamp
- First president to receive votes from every presidential elector in an election (Note: In both the 1789 and 1792 elections, each elector voted for Washington and for another candidate.)
- First president to be inaugurated in New York City
- First president to fill the entire body of the United States federal judges; including the United States Supreme Court
- First president to deliver a State of the Union address (1790)
- First president to have a first lady older in age (Note: Martha Washington, the wife of George Washington and thus the first First Lady of the United States, was born on June 2, 1731, making her 265 days older than her husband.)
- First president to command a standing field army while in office (during the Whiskey Rebellion)
- First president who was not affiliated with any political party
- First president to go uncontested in an election
- First president to not have any biological children
- First president to be declared an honorary citizen of a foreign country, and an honorary citizen of France
- First president to deliver a farewell address
- First president to have a constitutional amendment passed during his tenure (the first 11 amendments were passed during his two terms)

== John Adams (1797–1801) ==
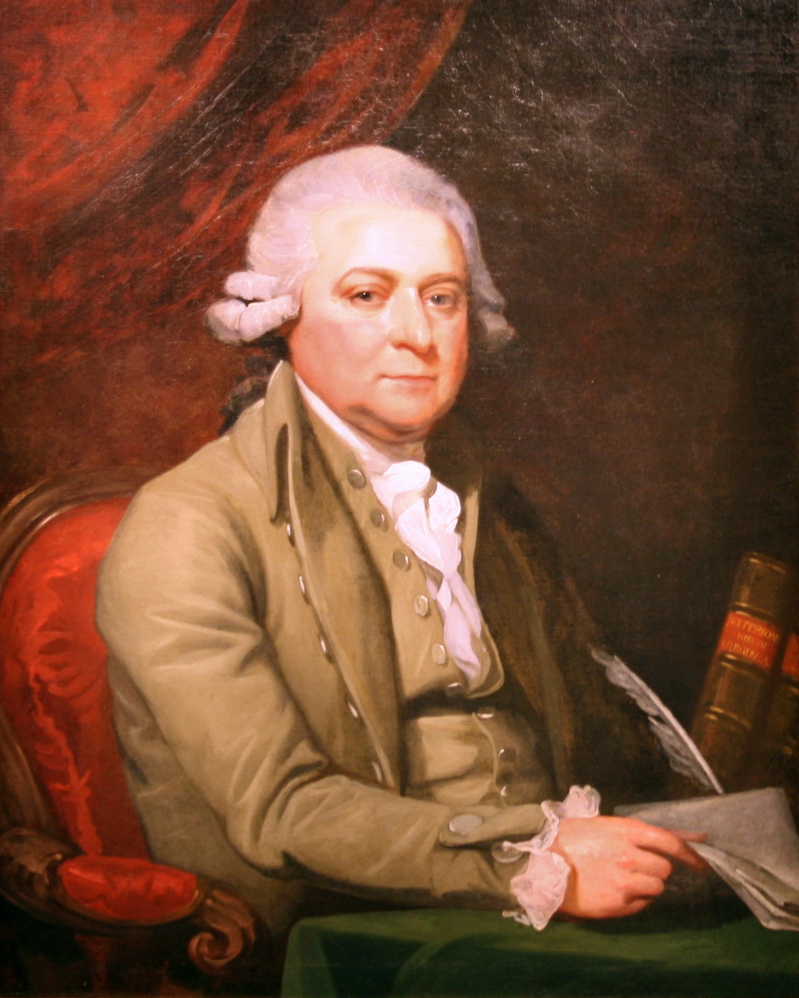
John Adams was the first president to wear a powdered wig tied in a queue in the fashion of the 18th century.

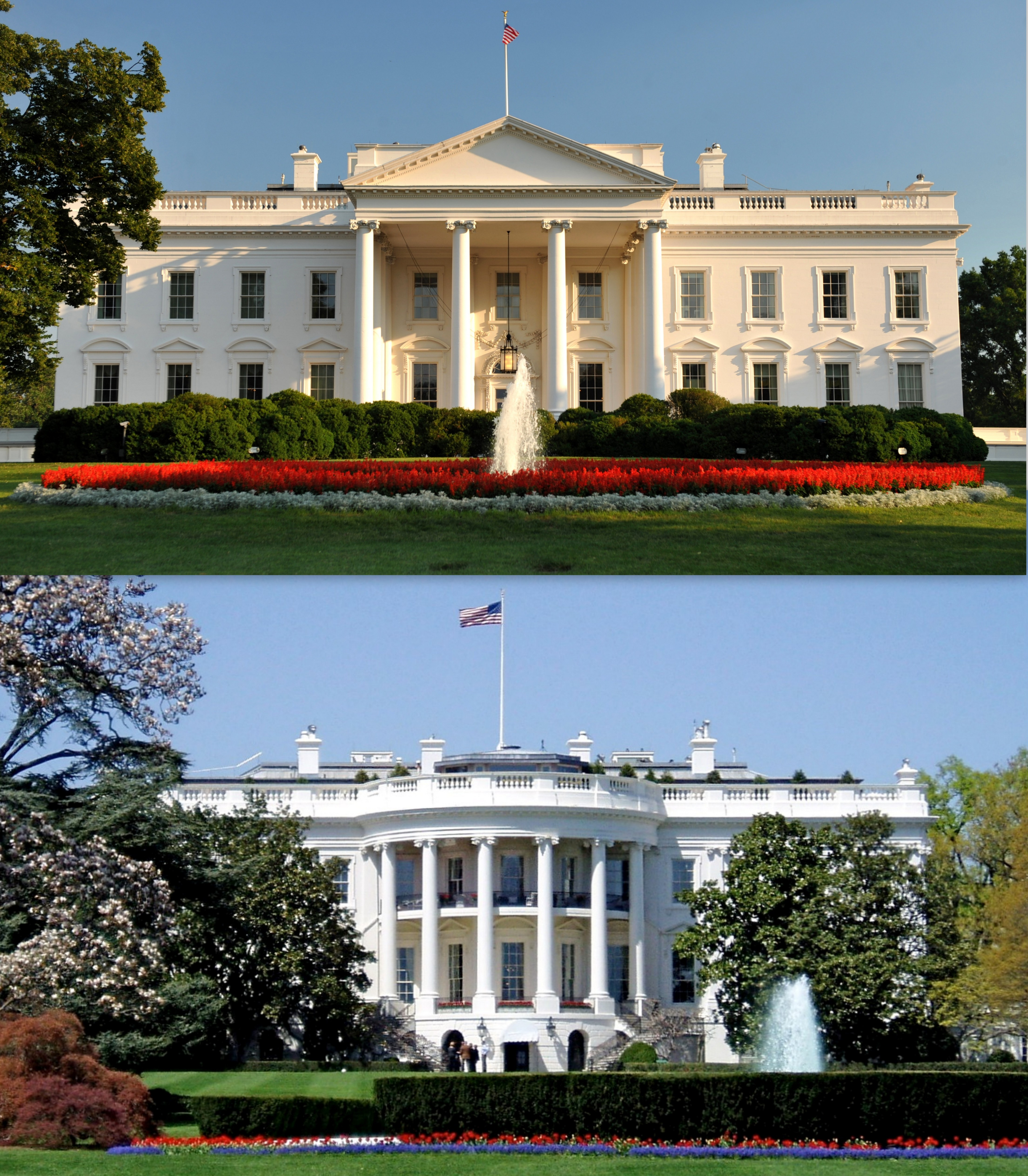
John Adams was the first president to live in the White House.

- First president to live in the White House
- First president to have previously served as vice president (Note: Adams served as vice president under George Washington, and thus was the first vice president of the nation.)
- First president to have previously served as an ambassador to a foreign country
- First president to be a lawyer
- First president who had never served in the military
- First president to not be a slave owner
- First president to wear a powdered wig tied in a queue in the fashion of the 18th century (Note: George Washington powdered his own long hair tied in a queue.)
- First president who attended one of the Ivy League colleges
- First president to have biological children (Note: Adams and his wife Abigail had six children, including John Quincy Adams, the sixth president. Washington did not have any children by his own, and was only a stepfather.)
- First president to receive the oath of office from a chief justice of the Supreme Court
- First president not to veto any bills while in office
- First president to have a child (Charles Adams) die while in office (Note: Charles Adams, the second son of John Adams, died of liver cirrhosis on November 30, 1800, when his father was still president. He was a chronic alcoholic, and was estranged from his family at the time of his death.)
- First president to be defeated for a second term in office
- First president to not attend the inauguration of his successor (Note: Adams did not attend Thomas Jefferson's inauguration.)
- First president to have a first lady younger in age
- First president to have a child (John Quincy Adams) serve as president of the United States
- First president to live to the age of 90. (Note: Adams, who was born on October 30, 1735, and died on July 4, 1826, the 50th Independence Day of the United States, lived for 90 years, 247 days, and was the longest-lived president until 2001, when his record was broken by Ronald Reagan.)
- First president to have signed the Declaration of Independence
- First president to have visited Europe
- First president to meet a reigning British monarch
- First president to outlive another former president
- First president to be multilingual
- First president to not have any constitutional amendment be ratified during his term

== Thomas Jefferson (1801–1809) ==
- First president to have previously been a governor (Note: Jefferson was Governor of Virginia from 1779 to 1781.)
- First president to have previously served as secretary of state
- First president to have been widowed prior to his inauguration (Note: Jefferson's wife Martha died in 1782, 19 years before he was inaugurated. He was also the first president whose hostess was his daughter.)
- First president to be inaugurated in Washington, D.C.
- First president to have his inaugural speech reprinted in a newspaper
- First president whose inauguration was not attended by his immediate predecessor (Note: John Adams did not attend Jefferson's inauguration, due to personal problems.)
- First president to live a full presidential term in the White House
- First president to have previously lost a presidential election.
- First president to defeat an opponent he had previously lost to in a presidential election
- First president who defeated an incumbent president
- First president whose election was decided in the United States House of Representatives
- First president to have an inaugural parade; occurred during his second inauguration
- First president to cite the doctrine of executive privilege
- First president to have a vice president elected under the Twelfth Amendment (Note: Originally the runner-up in the presidential election was named vice president. Adams, Jefferson and Aaron Burr became vice presidents in this way.)
- First president to expand the country's territory
- First president to have pets at the White House; two grizzly bear cubs and a mockingbird
- First president to found a university after being in office; the University of Virginia in 1819
- First president to serve as rector of a university (University of Virginia)
- First president to deliver a State of the Union address via writing; this practice continued until 1913.
- First president to die on the Fourth of July
- First president to be outlived by one of his predecessors
- First president to father children while in office (Note: Jefferson fathered Madison and Eston Hemings during his time as President.)

== James Madison (1809–1817) ==
- First president to have served in the United States House of Representatives
- First president to ask Congress for a declaration of war
- First president to serve as a wartime commander-in-chief
- First president to have an inaugural ball
- First president to issue a pocket veto
- First president to have previously lost a senate election. (1788 Virginia Senate election)
- First president to have a parent live throughout his presidency (Note: Madison left office in 1817 and his mother Nelly Conway Madison died in 1829, only seven years before her son.)
- First president to have a second cousin as a future president (Zachary Taylor)
- First president to host a wedding in the White House
- First president to have a vice president die in office and the first president to have a vacancy in the office of vice president

== James Monroe (1817–1825) ==
- First president to have served in the United States Senate
- First president to have a child marry at the White House (Note: Monroe's daughter Mary married in 1820 at the Blue Room on the State Floor of the White House.)
- First president to ride on a steamboat
- First president to have previously lost a House of Representatives election (1789 Virginia's 5th congressional district election)
- First president to have previously lost a race for a major party's nomination for president (1808 Democratic-Republican nomination)
- First president to have held over 50 years of elected public office positions by the end of his presidency
- First president to have held two cabinet positions at once prior to assuming office
- First president to have a foreign capital named after him (Monrovia, Liberia)

== John Quincy Adams (1825–1829) ==
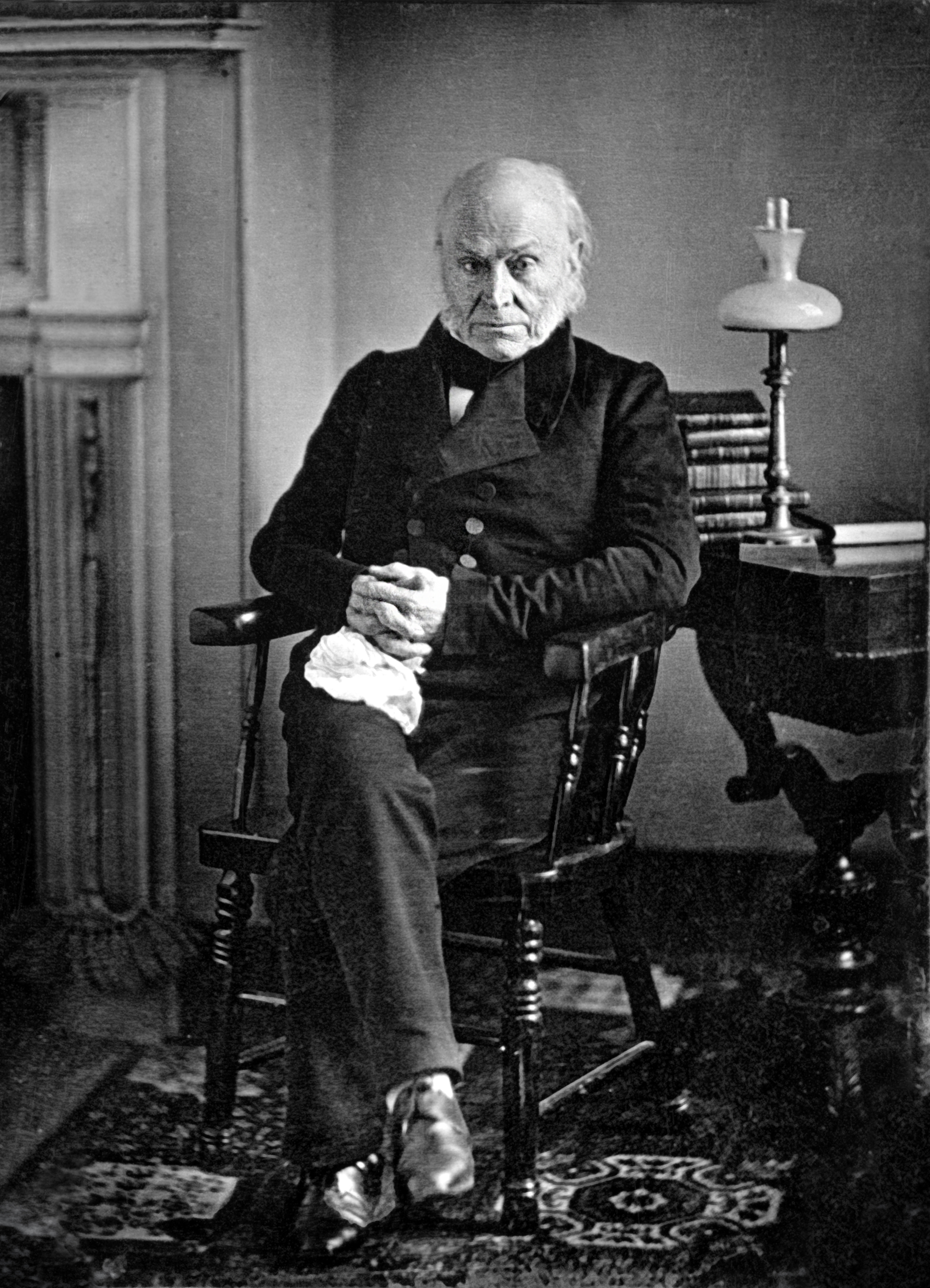
Philip Haas took this daguerreotype of John Quincy Adams in 1843.

- First president to be the son of another president (Note: Adams was the eldest son of John Adams and his wife Abigail Adams.)
- First president whose father lived to see him become president (Note: Adams' father, former president John Adams, was still alive when he took office, and died in 1826.)
- First president to have a foreign-born spouse
- First president to have a son marry at the White House (Note: Adams' son John Adams II married in the Blue Room on February 25, 1828.)
- First president to have a surviving photograph of him
- First president elected despite receiving fewer votes in the popular election than his opponent
- First president elected despite receiving fewer electoral votes than one of his opponents (Andrew Jackson)
- First president to adopt a short haircut instead of long hair tied in a queue
- First president to have been inaugurated wearing long trousers instead of knee breeches
- First president to serve in Congress after serving in the presidency
- First president to die from a stroke
- First president to have been nominated to the Supreme Court (Note: Adams was nominated by James Madison in 1811 and confirmed by the Senate, but declined the appointment.)
- First president to have any facial hair
- First president to have a foreign-born child
- First president who was not a Founding Father
- First president to swear upon a book other than the Bible during their oath of office

== Andrew Jackson (1829–1837) ==
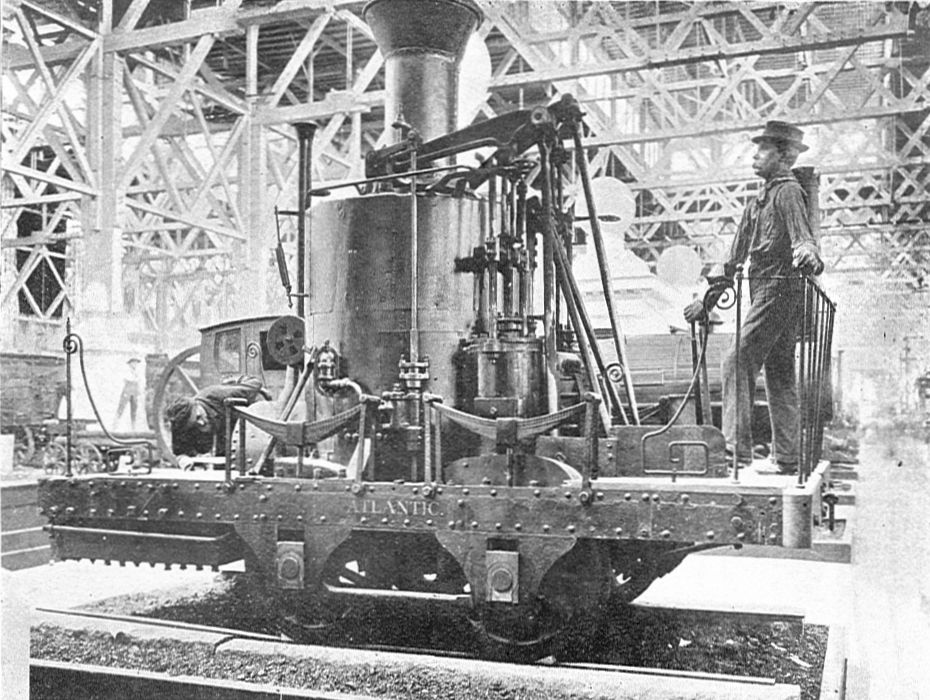
Baltimore & Ohio Grasshopper locomotive, 1832, the same model Andrew Jackson would have been a passenger on

- First president born in a log cabin
- First president born to immigrant parents (Note: Jackson's parents and two brothers emigrated from Ireland in 1765, two years before he was born.)
- First president to be inaugurated on the East Portico of the United States Capitol, facing the Library of Congress and Supreme Court
- First president to pay off the entire national debt
- First president born after the death of his father (Note: Jackson's father, Andrew Jackson Sr., died in an accident in late February 1767, around three weeks before his son was born.)
- First president elected as a Democrat to the presidency
- First president to marry a divorced woman
- First president to kill someone in a duel (Note: Jackson dueled with Charles Dickinson. Jackson was injured in the chest but killed Dickinson.)
- First president to survive an assassination attempt while in office (Note: On January 30, 1835, a painter named Richard Lawrence tried to assassinate Jackson by trying to shoot him with his gun, but was unsuccessful. Lawrence was arrested soon after, but was found not guilty due to mental iilness, and was sent to a mental hospital, where he lived until his death in 1861. Jackson was uninjured in the attack.)
- First president born in the Carolinas
- First president to ride on a railroad train
- First president to be censured by the Senate, although it was expunged in 1837
- First president to have previously administered the oath of office to a vice president of the United States (John C. Calhoun)
- First president to die outside of the original British Thirteen Colonies.

== Martin Van Buren (1837–1841) ==
- First president born after the Declaration of Independence (Note: Van Buren was born on December 5, 1782, 6 years, 154 days after the Declaration of Independence.)
- First president to be a non-native speaker of English (Note: Dutch was Van Buren's first language. He was called as Careful Dutchman for this factor. He spoke English as a second language.)
- First president not of British ancestry
- First president to have Dutch ancestry
- First president from the state of New York
- First president to be born a citizen of the United States and not a British subject
- First president to have multiple members of the same party (Whig) run against him
- First president to receive over 1 million votes in an election while in office
- First president from the Northern United States to have owned a slave
- First president to run for presidency on a third-party ticket

== William Henry Harrison (1841) ==
- First president elected as a Whig to the presidency
- First president to have 10 or more biological children (Note: Harrison had 10 children from his wife Anna Harrison, and is allegedly believed to have a daughter from a slave.)
- First president to be a grandfather of a future president (Note: Benjamin Harrison was the grandson of William Henry Harrison, being the son of W. H. Harrison's son John Scott Harrison, who is thus the only person to have been both the son of a president and the father of another president.)
- First president to give an inaugural address of more than 5,000 words
- First president to not issue an executive order
- First president to die in office (Note: Harrison, who fell ill after suffering from pneumonia just three weeks after taking office, died on April 4, 1841, aged 68. He served as president for just 32 days, and is the shortest-served president.)
- First president to serve less than one full term in office (Note: Harrison took office on March 4, 1841, and died in office on April 4, 1841, just 32 days after taking office. His presidency remains the shortest of all presidents.)
- First president to have previously lost an election for governor of a state (1820 Ohio gubernatorial election)
- First president to receive over 1 million votes in a presidential election before assuming office
- First president to have a photograph taken while in office (Note: Harrison's photograph, taken shortly after his inauguration, has been lost to history. Former president John Quincy Adams was the first president to have a surviving photograph of him, taken in 1843, while James K. Polk had his photograph taken as an incumbent after he took office in 1845, which also survives.)

== John Tyler (1841–1845) ==
- First president to ascend to the presidency by the death of his predecessor
- First president to have a veto overridden
- First president to face a vote of impeachment in the House (it was unsuccessful)
- First president to be widowed while in office (Note: Tyler's first wife, First Lady Letitia Christian Tyler, died on September 10, 1842, due to a massive stroke. Aged only 51, she is the shortest-lived First Lady in U.S. history.)
- First president to have previously lost a presidential election as a running mate (1836 United States presidential election)
- First president to remarry while in office (Note: Tyler married Julia Gardiner Tyler on June 27, 1844, and had children with her.)
- First president to be born after the ratification of the United States Constitution
- First president to be expelled from his political party while in office
- First president to be buried under a foreign flag (Note: Tyler died in Richmond, Virginia, then capital of the breakaway Confederate States of America, in 1862. His casket was draped with a Confederate flag.)
- First president to have links to the Confederate States of America
- First president to never win a presidential election
- First president to father children after leaving office (Note: Tyler fathered seven children with Julia Gardiner Tyler after leaving office in 1845.)

== James K. Polk (1845–1849) ==
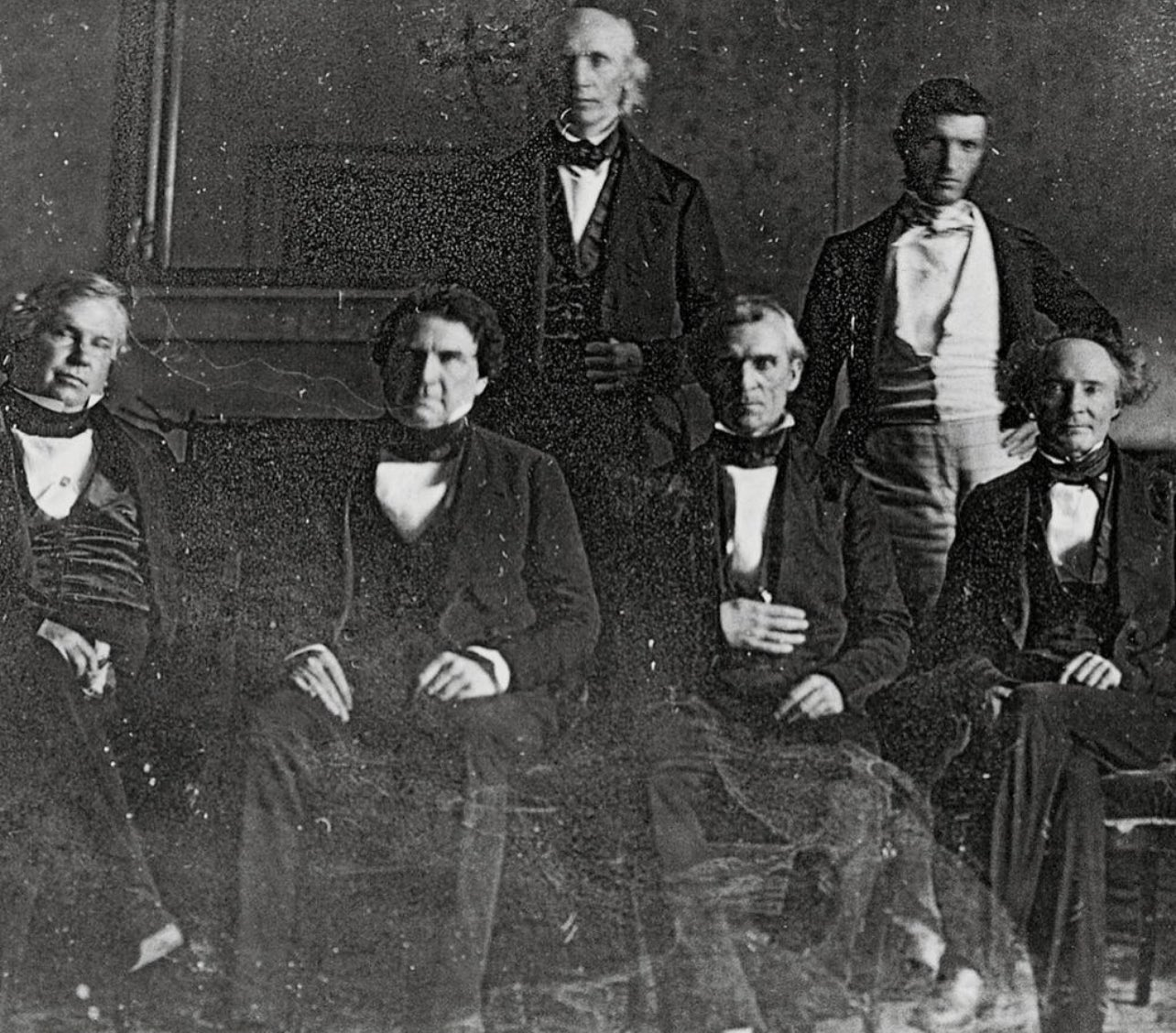
Polk and his cabinet in the White House dining room, 1846. Front row, left to right: John Y. Mason, William L. Marcy, James K. Polk, Robert J. Walker. Back row, left to right: Cave Johnson, George Bancroft. Secretary of State James Buchanan is absent. This was the first photograph taken in the White House, and the first of a presidential cabinet.

- First president to be under the age of 50 upon election and upon entering office (Note: Polk was aged 49 years, 122 days when he was inaugurated.)
- First president to have served as speaker of the House of Representatives (Note: Polk served as the speaker from 1835 to 1839, during the presidency of his mentor Andrew Jackson.)
- First president to be elected despite losing his states of birth and residence (Note: Polk lost both North Carolina, his state of birth, and Tennessee, his state of residence, but still managed to win the elections and became the president.)
- First president to be nominated by his party as a dark horse
- First president not to seek re-election upon the completion of his one term
- First president to die before reaching the age of 60 (Note: Polk was aged 53 years, 225 days when he died of cholera on June 15, 1849. He remains the shortest-lived president to die from natural causes.)
- First president to predecease a parent and a mother (Note: Polk died in 1849, soon after leaving office. Jane Knox Polk, his mother, died in 1852, having outlived her son by three years.)
- First president not to keep a pet during his term in office
- First president to have his cabinet photographed
- First president to have a surviving photograph taken of him while in office

== Zachary Taylor (1849–1850) ==
- First president who had served in no prior elected office
- First president to serve in the Mexican–American War
- First president to take office while his party held a minority of seats in the Senate
- First president to win election with his party holding no majority in either chamber of Congress
- First president to win a presidential election in November
- First president to be awarded the Congressional Gold Medal more than once (Note: Taylor was awarded the Congressional Gold Medal three times, first in 1846, second in 1847 and third in 1848.)
- First president to use the term "First Lady"
- First president to be a second cousin of a previous president (James Madison)

== Millard Fillmore (1850–1853) ==
- First president to establish a permanent White House library
- First president born in the 1800s (Note: Fillmore was born on January 7, 1800, six days after the year began. He was also the first president who was born after the death of a former president, since he was born 24 days after the death of George Washington, who died on December 14, 1799.)
- First president to leave office while his father was alive (Note: Fillmore left office in 1853 and his father Nathaniel Fillmore died in 1863.)
- First president to install a kitchen stove in the White House
- First president to formally have a direct communication with Japan

== Franklin Pierce (1853–1857) ==
- First president born in New Hampshire
- First president to install central heating in the White House
- First president to deliver his inaugural address from memory
- First president to affirm the oath of office rather than to swear it
- First president who had been elected to actively seek reelection but be defeated for nomination for a second term by his party
- First president to have a Christmas tree in the White House
- First president to keep his original cabinet members for his entire four-year term
- First president to have multiple vetoes overridden

== James Buchanan (1857–1861) ==
- First president born in Pennsylvania
- First president to serve in the military and not become an officer during their service (Note: Buchanan served as a private in the War of 1812 during the Battle of Baltimore, to date the first and only president to have only served in a non-officer capacity)
- First president to defeat a sitting president of the same party at the nominating convention
- First president to be a bachelor (Note: Buchanan was actually engaged to his girlfriend Anne Caroline Calman, whom he met in Lancaster, but she broke off the engagement after hearing some rumors about him, and died soon after. This incident devastated Buchanan very much, and he vowed never to marry in his lifetime. He still remains the only bachelor to have served as the president.)

== Abraham Lincoln (1861–1865) ==
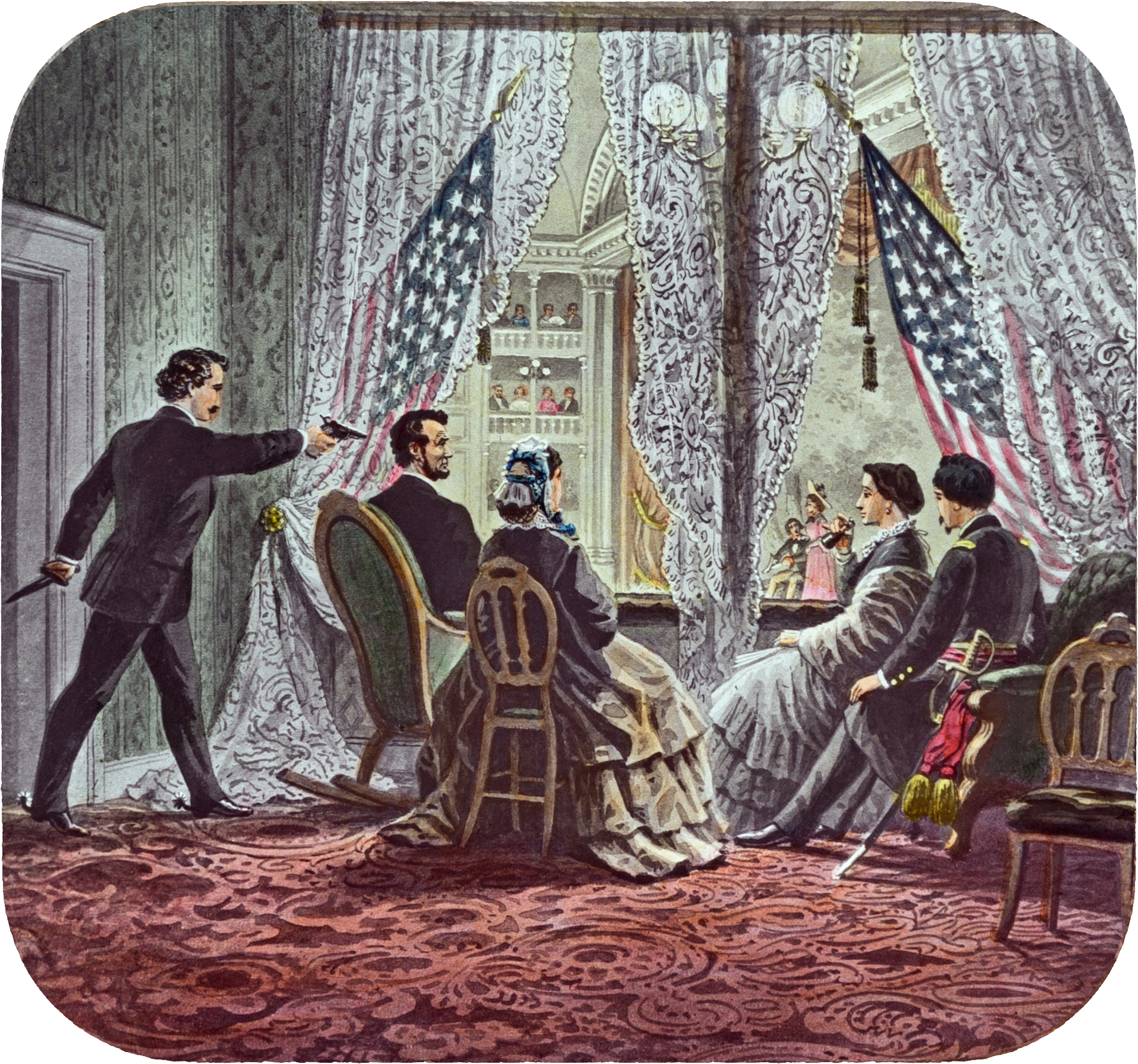
Abraham Lincoln was the first president to be assassinated.

- First president born in Kentucky
- First president born outside of the original 13 colonies
- First president to hold a patent
- First president to be assassinated
- First president elected as a Republican to the presidency
- First president to have a beard
- First president born in the Southern United States who never owned slaves
- First president to have pet cats

== Andrew Johnson (1865–1869) ==
- First president born in a current state capital (Raleigh, North Carolina)
- First president to ascend to the presidency by the assassination of his predecessor
- First president to be impeached by the House of Representatives
- First president to have members of his own party vote for impeachment
- First president to serve in the Senate after being president
- First president to issue more than twenty vetoes
- First president to have more than ten vetoes overridden

== Ulysses S. Grant (1869–1877) ==
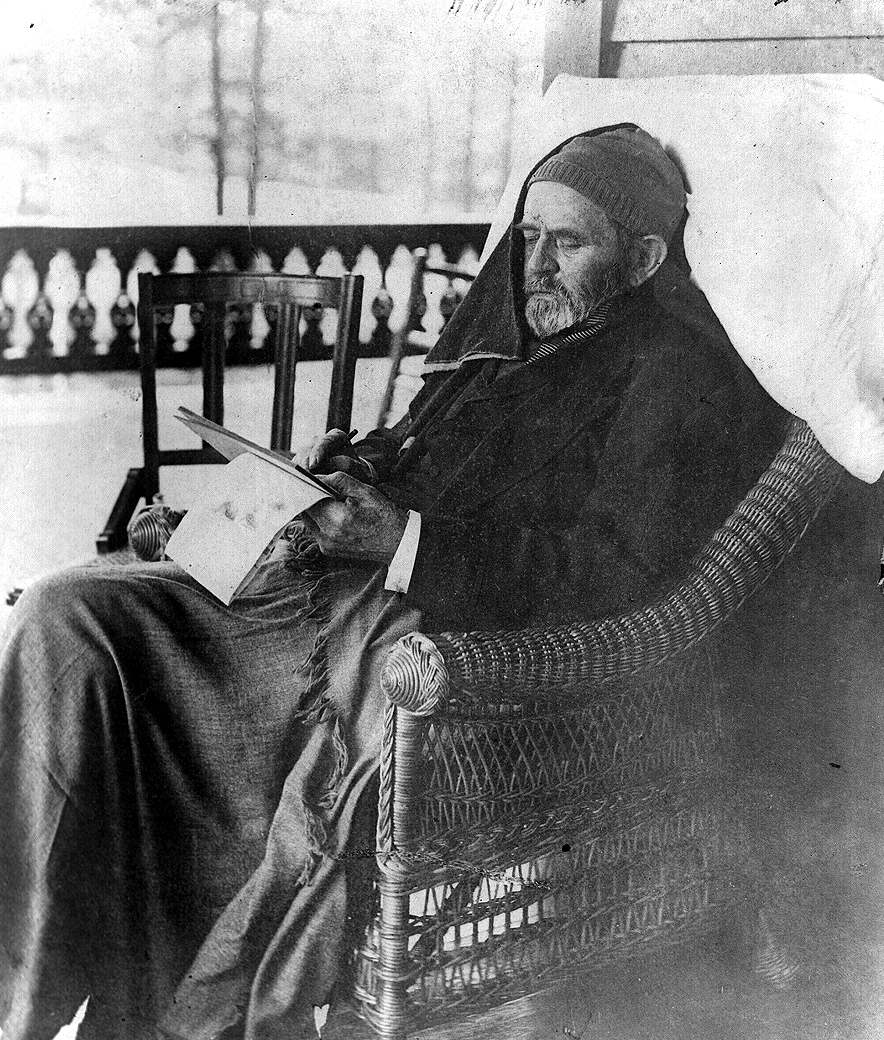
Ulysses S. Grant, seen here shortly before his death, was the first president to write a memoir.

- First president born in Ohio
- First president to have both parents alive during his presidency (Note: Grant's father, Jesse Root Grant, died in 1873, and his mother Hannah Simpson Grant died in 1883. Neither attended the inauguration of their son.)
- First president to appear with a moustache in office
- First president to veto more than fifty bills
- First president to visit Ireland, Egypt, China, and Japan (in 1878–1879, after leaving the presidency)
- First president to publish his memoirs
- First president to issue more than 40 pocket vetoes
- First president to issue more than 100 executive orders
- First president to attend a synagogue service while in office
- First president to have served in the American Civil War
- First president to host an Indian chief in the White House
- First president to approve of and sign in a National Park
- First president to set aside federal land for wildlife protection
- First president to be placed under arrest while in office

== Rutherford B. Hayes (1877–1881) ==
- First president to hold a state Thanksgiving dinner
- First president to hold the White House Easter Egg Roll
- First president to have a telephone installed in the White House
- First president to have a typewriter installed in the White House
- First president to visit the West Coast of the United States while in office
- First president to win the electoral vote but lose the popular vote.
- First president to be wounded in the American Civil War

== James A. Garfield (1881) ==
- First president to be elected to the presidency directly from the House of Representatives
- First president to be left-handed or ambidextrous (Note: It is widely believed that Garfield could simultaneously write Greek with his left hand and Latin with his right hand.)
- First president to die before reaching the age of 50 (Note: Garfield, born on November 19, 1831, was aged 49 years, 304 days when he died as a result of complications caused by gunshot.)
- First president to have served as a university president
- First president to deliver a campaign speech in a language other than English
- First president who was a mathematician (he found a proof of the Pythagorean theorem).

== Chester A. Arthur (1881–1885) ==
- First president born in Vermont
- First president to take the oath of office in his own home (Note: Arthur was staying at his home in New York in the night of September 19, 1881, when he got the news of Garfield's death. He took oath as the president immediately, with the oath being administered by a judge of New York Supreme Court, John Brady.)
- First president to have an elevator installed in the White House

== Grover Cleveland (1885–1889, 1893–1897) ==
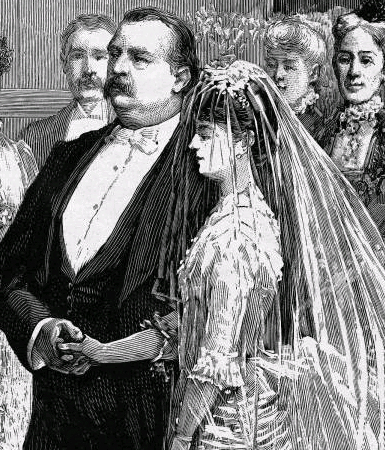
Grover Cleveland was the first president to serve nonconsecutive terms, and the first president to be married (to Frances Folsom) at the White House.

- First president born in New Jersey
- First president to get married at the White House
- First president to have a child born in the White House
- First president to serve nonconsecutive terms
- First president to be filmed
- First president to veto more than 100 bills, with over 500, including over 200 pocket vetoes

== Benjamin Harrison (1889–1893) ==
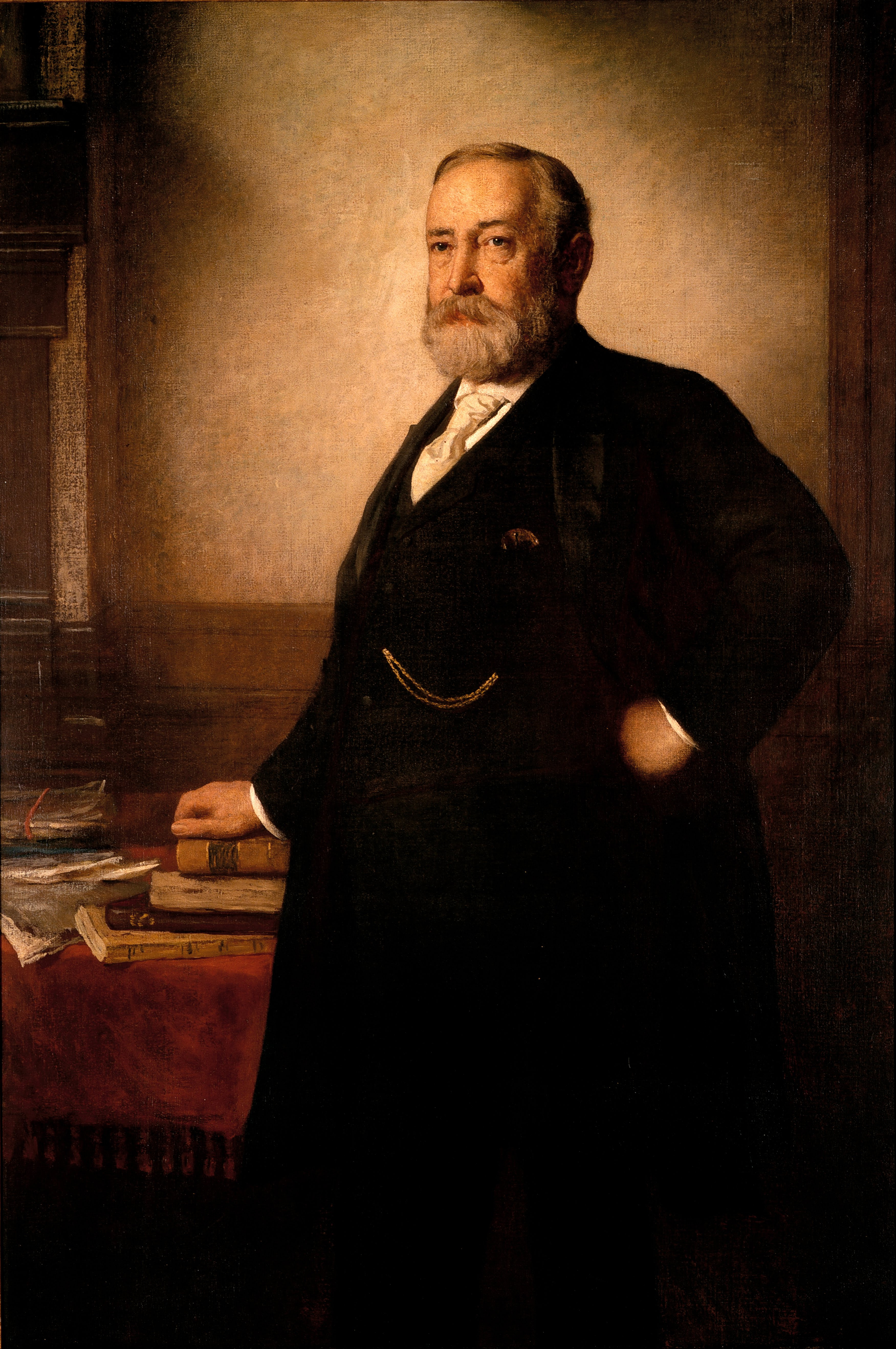
Benjamin Harrison was the first president to be portrayed wearing a modern long tie.

First president to attend a MLB game. https://www.mlb.com/cut4/benjamin-harrison-is-first-u-s-president-to-attend-mlb-game-in-1892-c233930574

- First president to be the grandson of another president (Note: Harrison was the grandson of William Henry Harrison, being the son of W. H. Harrison's son John Scott Harrison, who is thus the only person to have been both the son of a president and the father of another president.)
- First president to have a lighted Christmas tree at the White House
- First president to have electric lighting installed in the White House
- First president to have his voice recorded.
- First president to create and designate a United States Prehistoric and Cultural Site
- First president to be portrayed wearing a modern long tie. (Note: Portrayed in 1895, two years after his presidency ended.)

== William McKinley (1897–1901) ==
- First president to ride in an automobile (Note: McKinley rode with Freelan Oscar Stanley of the Stanley Motor Carriage Company in his steam car in 1899. He also rode in an electric ambulance that carried him to the hospital where he was treated after being shot.)
- First president to campaign by telephone
- First president to use a modern campaign button for an election

== Theodore Roosevelt (1901–1909) ==
President Theodore Roosevelt prepares to take his first airplane ride with pilot Arch Hoxsey (back to camera) at Kinloch Field during the 1910 International Aeronautic Tournament

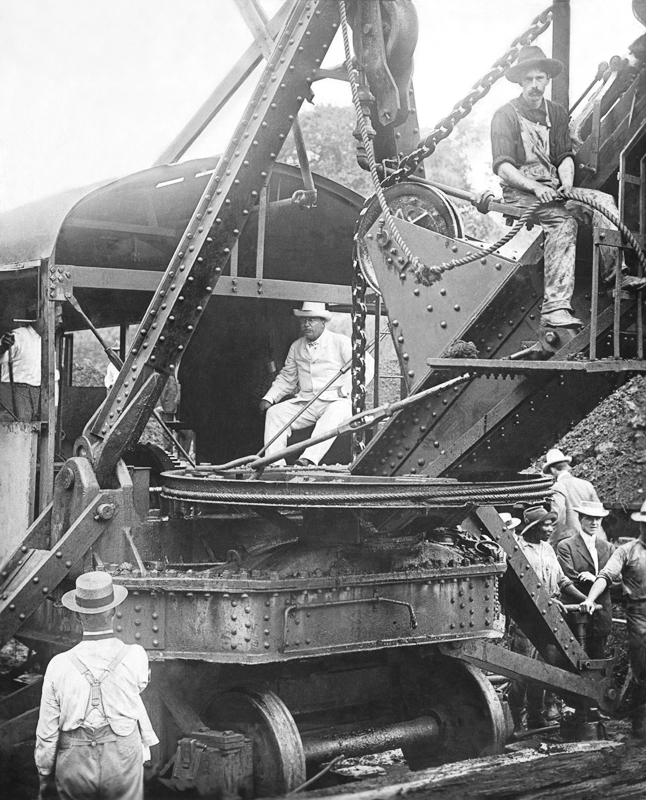
Theodore Roosevelt, shown here sitting in a steam shovel along the Panama Canal route in 1906, was the first president to visit a foreign country while in office.

- First president born in New York City
- First president who ascended to the presidency upon the death of a predecessor, and later was elected to the presidency in his own right (Note: Roosevelt was elected vice president in 1900, ascended to the presidency after the assassination of William McKinley in 1901, and was elected in his own right in 1904.)
- First president (and first American) to be awarded the Nobel Peace Prize (Note: Roosevelt won the award in 1906, due to his successful mediation to end the Russo-Japanese War (1904–1905).)
- First president to ride in any sort of aircraft
- First president to ride in a submarine
- First president to travel outside the contiguous United States and to visit a foreign country while in office (Note: Roosevelt travelled to the Panama Canal Zone in 1906, where he inspected construction of Panama Canal, and visited Panama.)
- First president to have his offices in the West Wing
- First president to earn the Medal of Honor (Note: Roosevelt won the award for his service in the Spanish–American War, and in particular his role in the Battle of San Juan Hill. The Medal of Honor was awarded posthumously in 2001, by the then-president Bill Clinton.)
- First president to issue over 1000 executive orders
- First president to call for global governance
- First president to fully campaign for a third presidential term.
- First president to be wounded in an assassination attempt while out of office (Note: Roosevelt was injured by a gunshot on October 14, 1912, while campaigning as a candidate for Progressive Party, a party which he formed after leaving office. The bullet, fired by a former saloonkeeper named John Flammang Shrank, lodged in Roosevelt's chest, destroying his steel eyeglass case and a 50-page manuscript of his speech. Despite warnings from doctors, Roosevelt continued his speech and went for tests only after ending it. Shrank was arrested on spot, but was later proven not guilty due to matter of insanity, and was sentenced for institutionalization.)
- First president to have previously lost a mayoral election (1886 New York City mayoral election)
- First president to designate a National Wildlife Refuge
- First president to wear eyeglasses full time in office (Note: Roosevelt suffered from high myopia throughout his life, and could not even distinguish his children when he was not wearing glasses. He was well known for his pince-nez frames.)
- First president to appoint a Jew (Oscar Straus) to a cabinet office
- First president to be widowed and remarried prior to taking office
- First president to be portrayed wearing a modern long tie while in office. (Note: First president portrayed wearing a long tie was Benjamin Harrison in 1895, two years after his presidency ended.)
- First president to not swear upon anything during their oath of office.

== William Howard Taft (1909–1913) ==
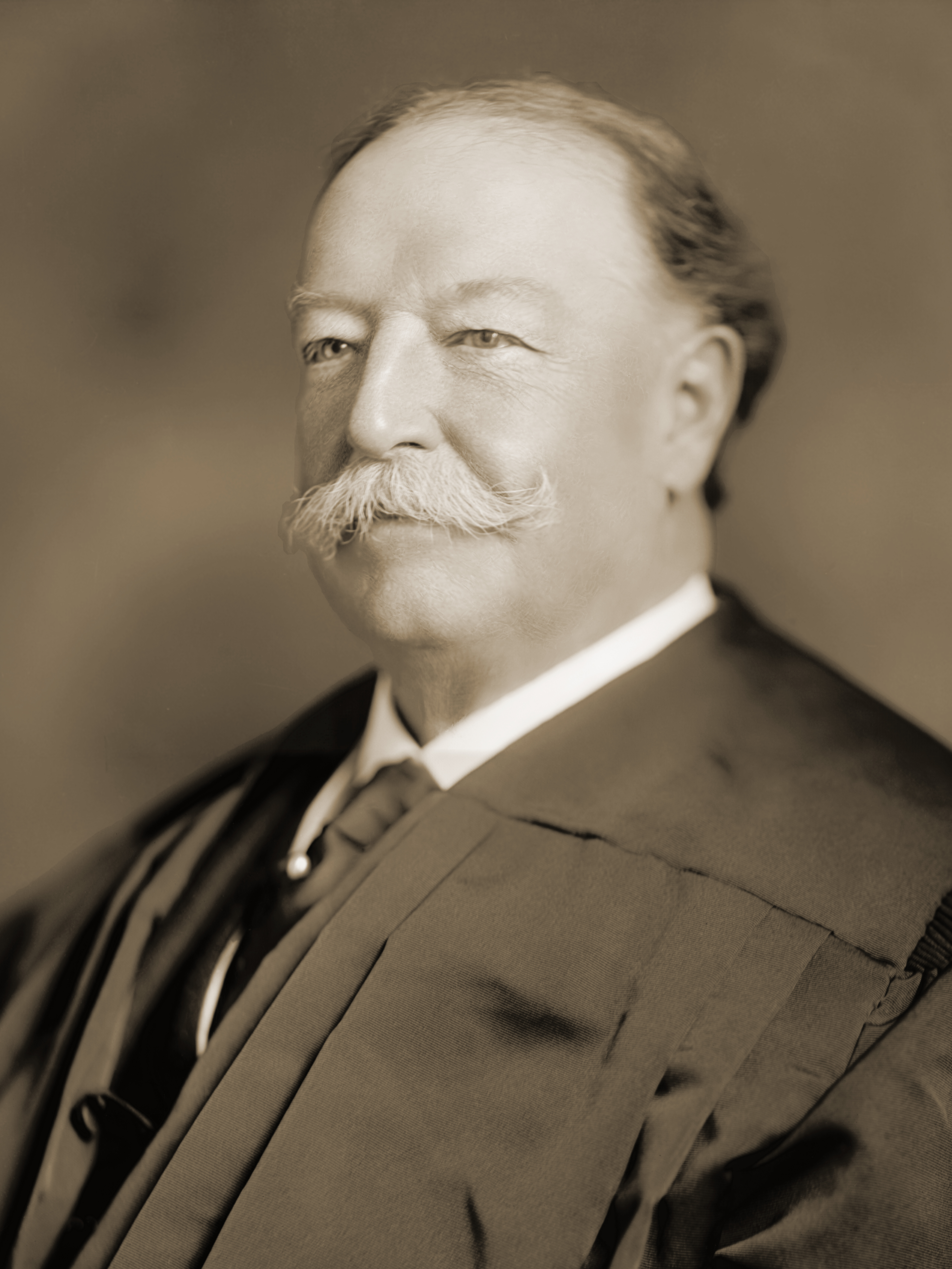
William Howard Taft was the first president to also serve on the United States Supreme Court.

- First president to throw out a ceremonial first pitch (Note: Taft threw his pitch at Griffith Stadium, Washington, D.C., on the Washington Senators' Opening Day. The pitch took place on April 14, 1910.)
- First president to have weighed over 300 pounds
- First president to own an automobile (Note: In fact, Taft owned four cars when he was in office.)
- First president to serve in the federal judiciary, having served on the United States Court of Appeals for the Sixth Circuit
- First president to have been a former solicitor general (Note: Taft served as solicitor general from 1890 to 1892. He became president in 1909.)
- First president to preside over all of the 48 contiguous states (Note: Arizona and New Mexico were admitted to the Union under Taft's presidency.)
- First president to visit Mexico while in office
- First president to use the Oval Office
- First president to serve on the Supreme Court (Note: Taft left office as president in 1913. He was appointed chief justice in 1921, by President Warren Harding. As chief justice, he administered the oath of office to Calvin Coolidge and Herbert Hoover.)
- First president to be honorary president of the Boy Scouts of America
- First president to be buried at Arlington National Cemetery. He was also the first member of the Supreme Court to be buried at Arlington National Cemetery upon his death in 1930.

== Woodrow Wilson (1913–1921) ==
- First president to declare a national emergency (Note: With Proclamation 1354, Wilson declared a national emergency relating to water transportation and shipping in the United States.)
- First president to have a PhD (Note: Wilson received a PhD in political science from Johns Hopkins University.)
- First president to visit Europe while in office (Note: In 1918–19, Wilson visited: France, the United Kingdom, Italy (along with the Holy See, not yet a sovereign nation), and Belgium.)
- First president to meet with the pope while in office (Note: Wilson met Pope Benedict XV in 1919, during his visit to Vatican city.)
- First president to meet with a reigning British monarch while in office (Note: Wilson met with King George V in 1918, during his visit to the United Kingdom.)
- First president to hold a press conference or regular news briefings
- First president to appoint a Jew (Louis Brandeis) to the Supreme Court
- First president to attend a World Series game (Note: Wilson attended Game 2 of the 1915 World Series in Philadelphia between the Boston Red Sox and the Philadelphia Phillies.)
- First president to be buried in Washington, D.C. (Note: Wilson died in 1924, three years after he left office, and was interred in a sarcophagus in Washington National Cathedral.)
- First president to have the first lady perform presidential duties (Note: Edith Wilson, the second wife of Woodrow Wilson, and also his second first lady, performed the duties as president when Wilson suffered a debilitating stroke while in office in October 1919, which significantly impacted his life. She is also the first woman to perform presidential duties.)
- First president to serve in office during a World War (Note: Wilson served as the president during the First World War. He was also instrumental in the founding of the League of Nations, the first global organization formed after the World War I, but never allowed his country to join it.)

== Warren G. Harding (1921–1923) ==
- First president born after the Civil War (Note: Harding was born on November 2, 1865, more than six months after the end of the Civil War.)
- First president to have been a publisher
- First president to have been a lieutenant governor (Note: Harding served as Lieutenant Governor of Ohio from 1904 to 1906.)
- First president to be elected while being a sitting U.S. senator (Note: Harding was serving as a senator from Ohio when elected. He resigned his position as senator and was replaced by Frank B. Willis.)
- First president to learn about his victory over the radio
- First president to be elected on his birthday
- First president elected after women gained the right to vote
- First president to ride to and from his inauguration in a car
- First president to appoint a former president (William Howard Taft) to the Supreme Court
- First president to give his inaugural address over an amplified system
- First president to own and install a radio in the White House
- First president to learn to drive a car
- First president to visit Canada while in office
- First president to predecease his father (Note: Harding died in 1923, and his father, George Tryon Harding, died in 1928, five years after his son.)
- First president to be heard on a radio broadcast, over Navy radio station NOF in Anacostia, Washington, D.C.
- First president to use the term "Founding Fathers"

== Calvin Coolidge (1923–1929) ==
- First president to have the oath of office administered to him by a parent (Note: Coolidge was sworn in for the first time by his father, John Calvin Coolidge Sr., a Vermont notary public and justice of the peace in 1923.)
- First president born on the Fourth of July
- First president to be sworn in by a former president (Note: Coolidge was sworn in for the second time by William Howard Taft, who was chief justice at the time of the second inauguration of Coolidge in 1925.)
- First president to give a radio broadcast from the White House
- First president to visit Cuba while in office
- First president to be a Congregationalist
- First president to appear on U.S. coinage while alive and in office
- First president to serve as both governor and lieutenant governor of a state (Note: Coolidge served as Lieutenant Governor of Massachusetts from 1916 to 1919 and governor of Massachusetts from 1919 to 1921.)
- First president to be an honorary member of a Native American tribe

== Herbert Hoover (1929–1933) ==
- First president born west of the Mississippi River and first born in Iowa
- First president who was a Quaker
- First president to have a telephone on his desk
- First president to have a post-presidency of more than 30 years (Note: Hoover left office in 1933, and died on October 20, 1964, 31 years, 230 days after leaving office.)
- First president to have a multiethnic and Native American vice president (Charles Curtis) (Note: Charles Curtis, who served as vice president under Hoover, had a Native American ancestry, and was the first such person ever to reach the post.)
- First president to outlive his entire cabinet (Note: The last surviving member of Hoover's cabinet, Patrick J. Hurley, died on July 30, 1963, more than a year before Hoover's death on October 20, 1964.)
- First president to be filmed in color
- First president to have a Canadian parent
- First president to have Swiss ancestry

== Franklin D. Roosevelt (1933–1945) ==
- First president to be inaugurated on January 20 (per the Twentieth Amendment) (Note: Roosevelt's first inauguration took place on March 4, 1933. His second inauguration took place on January 20, 1937, and is the first inauguration to take place on that date. As a result of this, his first term was cut short by 43 days.)
- First president to appoint a woman (Frances Perkins) to a cabinet post (Note: Perkins was appointed United States Secretary of Labor in 1933. She served in that position until 1945, and resigned after Roosevelt died in office. She is the longest-served Secretary of Labor till date.)
- First president to appear five times on a national ticket, a record tied by Richard Nixon
- First president to appear on television (Note: On April 30, 1939, Roosevelt appeared at the opening ceremony of the 1939 New York World's Fair and gave a speech. The speech was televised, and Roosevelt became the first president of the United States to give a speech that is broadcast by television. Roosevelt's speech was seen on black and white television sets with 5 to 12-inch tubes.)
- First president to serve more than two terms (Note: Roosevelt won a record four presidential elections, and served four terms in office from 1933 to 1945. More precisely, Roosevelt served three full terms, and died 2 months and 24 days into his fourth term. He still remain the longest-served president of the United States. After his death, the term limit was reduced to two terms.)
- First president to establish a presidential library
- First president to veto more than 600 bills (Note: Roosevelt's total vetoes were 635, though 9 were overridden.)
- First president to issue more than 250 pocket vetoes (Note: Roosevelt issued 263 pocket vetoes.)
- First president to visit South America and Africa while in office (Note: Roosevelt visited Colombia, Brazil, Argentina, and Uruguay in his administration. However, Theodore Roosevelt visited Panama, which was considered part of South America when he visited but no longer is.)
- First president to fly in an airplane while in office
- First president to make a transatlantic flight (Note: Roosevelt traveled aboard a Boeing 314 Clipper during his secret 1943 mission to Casablanca. As a result of this trip, he also became the first president to visit Africa while in office. He visited Morocco, Liberia, Tunisia, Gambia, Egypt and Algeria.)
- First president to fly for state business in 1943
- First president to visit the Soviet Union, Iran and Haiti
- First president to establish the "First 100 Days" benchmark and tradition
- First president to be named Time Person of the Year
- First president to meet with a king of Saudi Arabia, Ibn Saud in 1945
- First president to use a wheelchair
- First president to have a child born in Canada
- First president to use Camp David as a presidential retreat

== Harry S. Truman (1945–1953) ==
- First president born in Missouri
- First president to be assigned a Secret Service code name
- First president to serve in World War I (Note: Truman served as an officer of the American Expeditionary Forces and commanded Battery D of the 129th Field Artillery Regiment. He saw combat service in the Meuse-Argonne Offensive. He was discharged from the Army in 1919, with the rank of major. He remained affiliated with the United States Army Reserve until 1953. He was promoted to lieutenant colonel in 1925 and colonel in 1932.)
- First president to have a nationally televised inauguration (Note: Truman's second inauguration in 1949 was the first presidential inauguration televised. Millions of people watched the inauguration, broadcast as a single live program that aired on every network. Many schoolchildren watched from their classrooms. Truman authorized a holiday for federal employees so that they could also watch. The ceremony, and Truman's speech, were also broadcast abroad through the Voice of America, and translated into other languages including Russian and German. According to some calculations, the 1949 inauguration had more witnesses than all previous presidential inaugurations combined.)
- First president to leave office on January 20 (after the passage of the Twentieth Amendment) (Note: Truman left office on January 20, 1953, and was succeeded by Dwight D. Eisenhower as the 34th president of the United States.)
- First president and person to be issued a Medicare card (Note: In 1965, President Lyndon B. Johnson signed the Medicare bill at the Harry S. Truman Presidential Library and Museum and gave the first two Medicare cards to Truman and his wife Bess Truman, to honor the former president's fight for government health care while in office.)
- First president to have his Farewell Address broadcast from the Oval Office
- First president to authorize the use of nuclear weapons against a foreign nation
- First president to meet a Swedish prime minister (he met Tage Erlander in 1952)
- First president to visit Germany

== Dwight D. Eisenhower (1953–1961) ==
- First president born in Texas
- First president to serve in World War II
- First president to serve in both World Wars
- First president to preside over all fifty contemporary U.S. states (Note: While being territories in prior administrations, Alaska and Hawaii would be formally admitted as states on January 3rd, 1959 and August 21, 1959, respectively)
- First president to begin his presidency on January 20 (per the Twentieth Amendment) (Note: Eisenhower began his presidency on January 20, 1953, succeeding Harry S. Truman.)
- First president awarded the Order of Muhammad
- First president to travel by jet aircraft and helicopter
- First president and first American to be appointed to the British Order of Merit
- First president to have a pilot's license
- First president to give a televised news conference, in 1955
- First president to appear on color television
- First president to deliver an address from a communications satellite – the first message from space
- First president to visit a mosque
- First president to have received an honorary knighthood from a foreign nation (Eisenhower received 22 such honors)
- First president to receive the Army Distinguished Service Medal, the Navy Distinguished Service Medal, and the Legion of Merit
- First president to receive the Philippine Distinguished Service Star, the French Médaille militaire, the French Croix de Guerre 1939–1945, the Belgian Croix de guerre, and the Luxembourgish Military Medal.
- First president to be made a Grand Cordon of the Japanese Order of the Chrysanthemum
- First president and American to receive the Soviet Order of Victory, for serving as Supreme Commander of the Allied Expeditionary Force
- First president to receive an Emmy Award
- First president to authorize a National Park in a United States territory: Virgin Islands National Park
- First president to visit Switzerland, Turkey, Pakistan, Afghanistan, India, Greece, Spain, Portugal, Chile, South Korea, the Philippines, and Taiwan while in office
- First president of Pennsylvania Dutch descent

== John F. Kennedy (1961–1963) ==
- First president who was Catholic
- First president born in the 20th century (Note: Kennedy was born in 1917 and took office in 1961. But four of his successors were older than him, the oldest of them being Lyndon B. Johnson, his immediate successor, who was born in 1908, and thus is the earliest-born president of the 20th century.)
- First president to be a member of the Greatest Generation
- First president to have been a Boy Scout
- First president of entirely Irish descent
- First president who had no ancestry from the American colonial period
- First president to have previously served in the United States Navy
- First president to receive the Purple Heart, awarded in 1943 after he was wounded in action aboard PT-109
- First president (along with future president Richard Nixon) to participate in the first televised presidential debates (Note: Kennedy and Nixon took part in four televised debates in 1960.)
- First president to win in a case of dueling electors without counsel
- First president to be awarded a Pulitzer Prize (Note: Kennedy received the Pulitzer Prize for Biography in 1957, for his book Profiles in Courage.)
- First president to have an inaugural poet; Robert Frost
- First president to use the Situation Room
- First president to visit Austria, Costa Rica, Venezuela, and Ireland while in office
- First president to have both his parents outlive him (Note: Kennedy was assassinated on November 22, 1963. His father Joseph P. Kennedy Sr. outlived him by six years, dying in 1969. His mother Rose Fitzgerald Kennedy outlived him by more than 30 years, dying in 1995. He has been, to date, the only president to have both parents outlive him, and also the shortest-lived U.S. president, dying at the age of 46 years, 177 days.)
- First president to have a grandparent outlive him (Note: Kennedy was assassinated on November 22, 1963. His maternal grandmother, Mary Josephine Hannon, died on August 8, 1964, at the age of 98. Already ailing at the time of her grandson's assassination, she was never told of his assassination.)
- First president to receive the Navy and Marine Corps Medal, awarded for his heroism as commanding officer of the Motor Torpedo Boat PT-109 when the ship was rammed and sunk by the Japanese destroyer Amagiri in 1943
- First president to ceremoniously grant a non-U.S. citizen honorary citizenship (Note: Kennedy granted honorary citizenship to former British Prime Minister Sir Winston Churchill in 1963.)
- First president to have an airport named after him

== Lyndon B. Johnson (1963–1969) ==
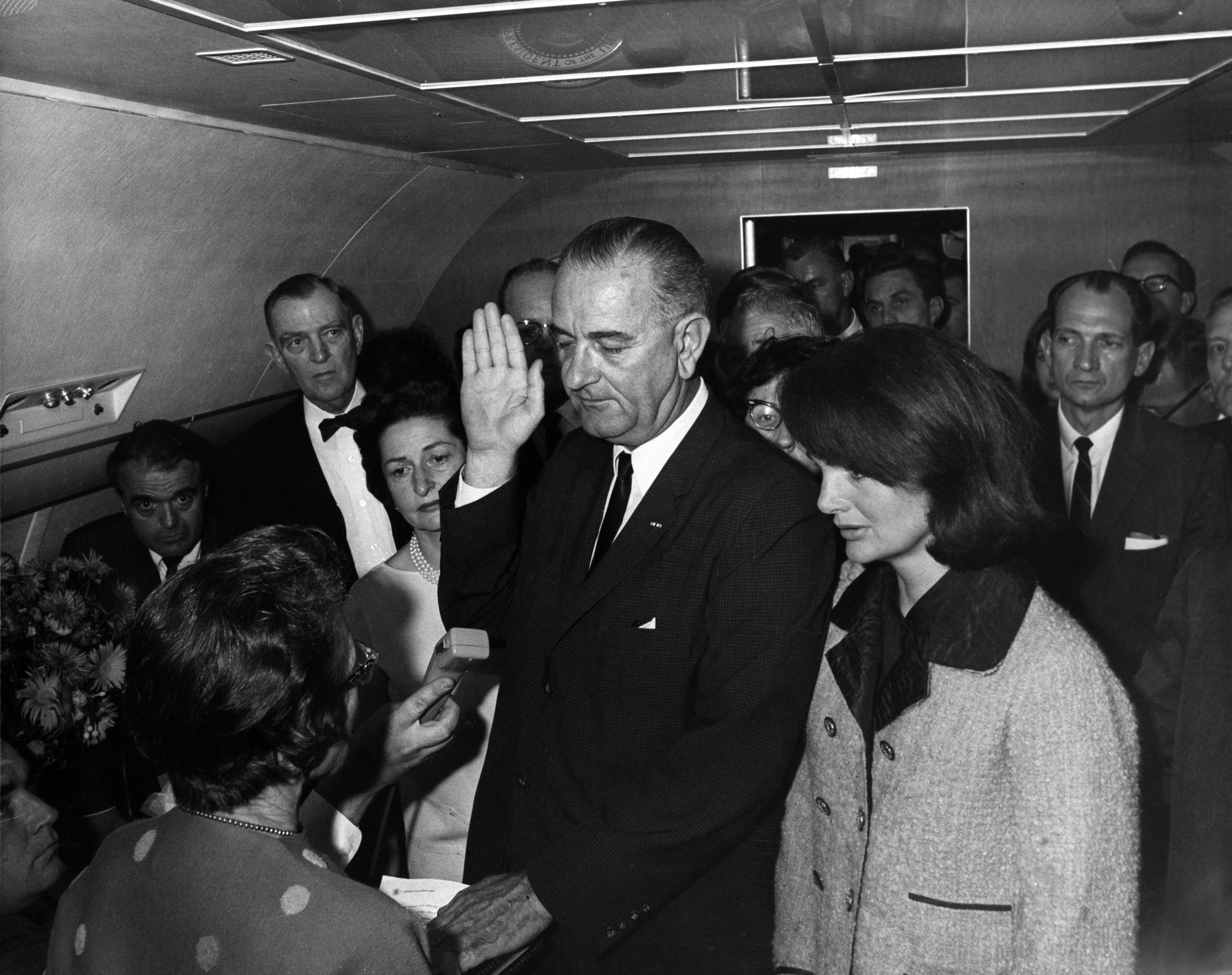
Following the assassination of John F. Kennedy, Lyndon B. Johnson became the first president to be inaugurated on an airplane and the first president to be sworn in by a woman. The inauguration is shown in the photo above.

- First president to have been party leader in the Senate, having been minority leader from 1953 to 1955 and majority leader from 1955 to 1961
- First president to have served as Senate Majority Whip, having served in that office from 1951 to 1953
- First president to be inaugurated on an airplane. His inauguration was held aboard Air Force One in 1963.
- First president to be sworn in by a woman (Sarah T. Hughes)
- First president to visit Australia, New Zealand, Vietnam, Thailand, Malaysia, Suriname, Honduras, Nicaragua, El Salvador, and Guatemala while in office.
- First president to appoint an African American (Thurgood Marshall) to the Supreme Court.
- First president to appoint an African American (Robert C. Weaver) to a cabinet post. Weaver was appointed the first United States secretary of housing and urban development in 1966.
- First president to use the presidential call button
- First president to receive the Silver Star

== Richard Nixon (1969–1974) ==
- First president born in California
- First president (along with past president John F. Kennedy) to have participated in the first presidential debates. He participated in four televised debates in 1960.
- First non-incumbent vice president to be elected president
- First president to attend an NFL game while in office
- First president to travel on a regularly scheduled commercial flight while in office.
- First president to visit the People's Republic of China, Indonesia, Romania, Yugoslavia, Israel, Poland, Iceland, Jordan, and Syria while in office.
- First president to meet an emperor of Japan, having met Hirohito in 1971
- First president to visit all 50 states
- First president to resign from the presidency. The resignation of Nixon in 1974, was a result of the Watergate scandal. There were efforts by the House of Representatives to impeach the president for obstruction of justice, abuse of power, and contempt of Congress.
- First president to be pardoned by another president (Gerald Ford) The pardon of Richard Nixon in 1974, gave Nixon a full and unconditional pardon for any crimes he might have committed against the United States while president.
- First president to relinquish their Secret Service detail

== Gerald Ford (1974–1977) ==
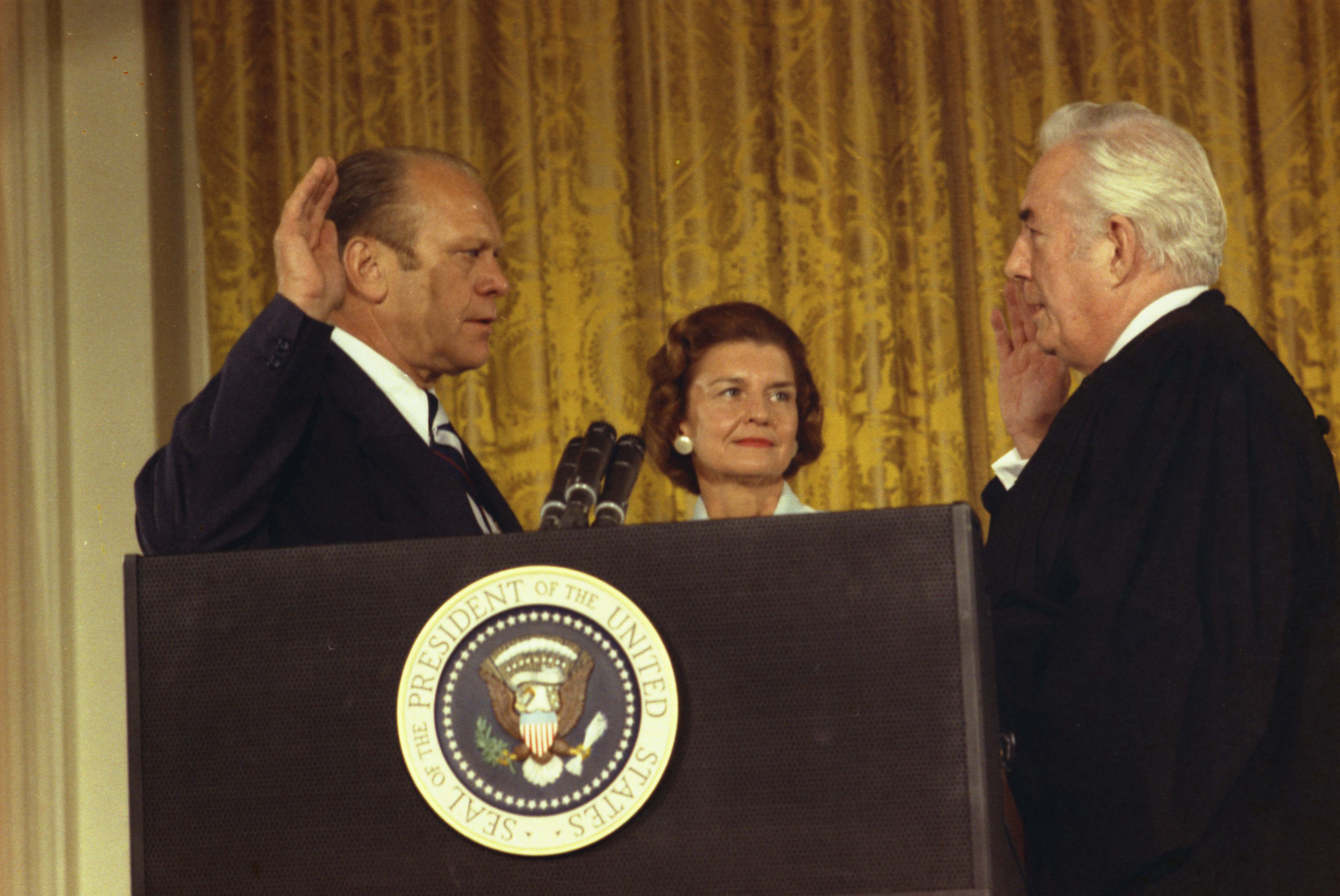
Following the resignation of Richard Nixon, Gerald Ford being sworn in by Warren Burger, was the first man to ascend to the presidency without being elected to either the offices of the president or vice president.

- First president born in Nebraska.
- First president to be an Eagle Scout, and receive the Distinguished Eagle Scout Award
- First president to serve as House Minority Leader, having served in that office from 1965 to 1973
- First president to serve as Republican Conference Chairman of the House of Representatives
- First president to ascend to the presidency by the resignation of his predecessor
- First president to ascend to the presidency without being elected to either the offices of the president or vice president
- First president to pardon another president (Richard Nixon). The pardon of Richard Nixon in 1974 gave Nixon a full and unconditional pardon for any crimes he might have committed against the United States while president.
- First president to visit Japan and Finland while in office
- First president to release a full report of his medical checkup to the public
- First president to have Polish ancestry
- First incumbent president to testify in a criminal trial (against Squeaky Fromme, who had attempted to assassinate him)

== Jimmy Carter (1977–1981) ==
- First president born in Georgia
- First president who was born in a hospital. (Note: Carter was born in the Wise Sanitarium of Plains, Georgia, in 1924, where his mother worked as a nurse.)
- First president to graduate from the United States Naval Academy; part of the class of 1947
- First president to use a nickname (Jimmy) in an official capacity (Note: Jimmy Carter's full name is James Earl Carter Jr, but he is better known by his nickname, "Jimmy" Carter, which was used on all official documents while he was president.)
- First president to walk on Pennsylvania Avenue during the inauguration parade
- First president to appoint a secretary of education (and first woman) (Shirley Hufstedler)
- First president to visit Nigeria and Guadeloupe while in office.
- First president to appoint a woman to be secretary of commerce (Juanita M. Kreps)
- First president who completed at least one full term in office and never made a nomination to the Supreme Court
- First president to have hosted an official papal visit at the White House. In 1979, Pope John Paul II became the first pontiff to visit a sitting president at the White House.
- First president to address the Knesset.
- First president to speak at a Democratic midterm conference (the 1978 Democratic Midterm Conference)
- First president to visit North Korea (post-office, on a diplomatic mission).
- First president to become a centenarian (Note: Carter celebrated his 100th birthday on October 1, 2024, nearly three months before his death on December 29.)
- First president to have been married for over 75 years (Jimmy and Rosalynn Carter were married for 77 years, 135 days.)
- First president to live to 40+ year post-presidency, Carter left the White House in 1981 and lived another 43 years after being president, until 2024.
- First president to live to the year when his official White House Christmas ornament was unveiled

== Ronald Reagan (1981–1989) ==
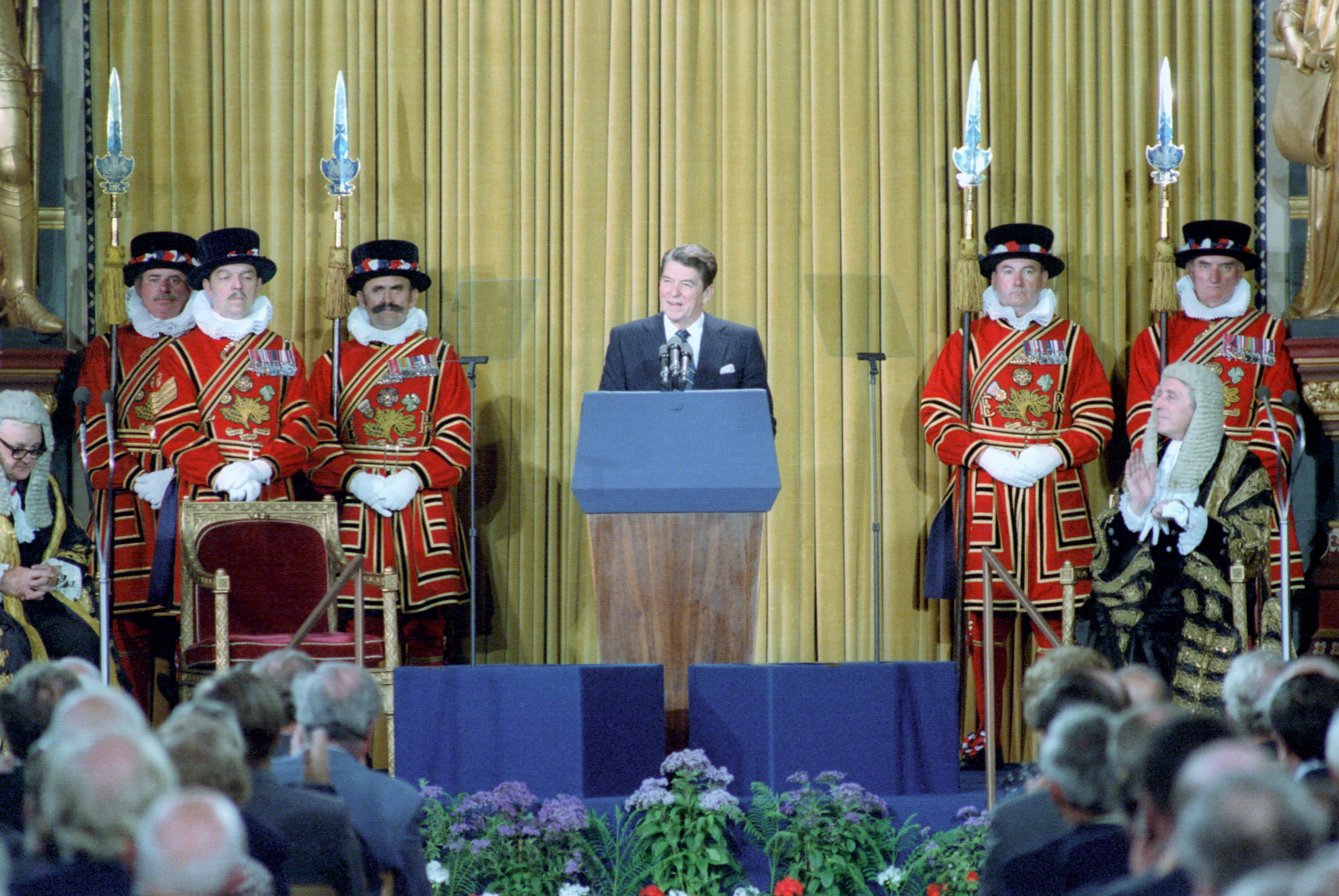
Ronald Reagan addressing the British parliament on June 8, 1982, the first U.S. president to do so

- First president born in Illinois.
- First president to have been divorced. He married his first wife (Jane Wyman) in 1940, and the couple divorced in 1949.
- First president to be the head of a union (the Screen Actors Guild).
- First president to have been an actor.
- First president to nominate a woman to the Supreme Court (Sandra Day O'Connor).
- First president to be inaugurated at the West Front of the Capitol Building.
- First president to be re-elected over the age of 70, as he was 73 years old when he was re-elected in 1984.
- First president to attend a NASCAR race while in office.
- First president to visit the New York Stock Exchange, (on March 28, 1985) while in office.
- First president to attend and open an Olympic Games (the 1984 Summer Olympics in Los Angeles) while in office.
- First president to address both houses of the British parliament. (on June 8, 1982)
- First president to receive a star on the Hollywood Walk of Fame.
- First president to win a Golden Globe Award.
- First president to be wounded in an assassination attempt while in office and survive his injuries.
- First president to visit an independent Jamaica, Barbados, and Grenada while in office
- First president to visit the DMZ while in office.
- First president to temporarily transfer power to the vice president, invoking the Twenty-fifth Amendment to the United States Constitution

== George H. W. Bush (1989–1993) ==
- First president to have been a naval aviator
- First president to have served as Ambassador to the United Nations (1971–1973)
- First president to have served as the chief of the United States Liaison Office in China (1974–1975)
- First president to have served as director of central intelligence (office is now the director of the Central Intelligence Agency) (January 1976 – January 1977)
- First president to have served as the chairperson of the Republican National Committee (1973–1974)
- First president to have served as acting president (when Reagan was sedated for eight hours due to colon surgery)
- First president to have the first Hispanic and first woman Surgeon General (Antonia Novello, M.D.)
- First president to visit Hungary, Malta, the Netherlands, Czechoslovakia, Singapore, Somalia, and the Russian Federation, as well as a reunified Germany while in office.
- First president to have received a Distinguished Flying Cross
- First president to formally pardon a turkey, officially sparking the Turkey Pardon Tradition
- First president to have been married for over 70 years (George H. W. and Barbara Bush were married for 73 years, 101 days.)
- First president to have lived at both Number One Observatory Circle and the White House
- First president to have Swedish ancestry
- First president to see his vice presidential bust unveiled while in office

== Bill Clinton (1993–2001) ==
- First president born in Arkansas
- First president born after World War II.
- First president to be a baby boomer
- First president to be a Rhodes Scholar
- First president whose inauguration was streamed on the Internet
- First president with an official White House website
- First president to nominate a woman for White House press secretary (Dee Dee Myers)
- First president to nominate a woman for secretary of state (Madeleine Albright)
- First president to nominate a woman for United States attorney general (Janet Reno)
- First president to appoint a Jewish woman (Ruth Bader Ginsburg) to the Supreme Court
- First president to nominate an openly gay ambassador (James C. Hormel).
- First president to address the Human Rights Campaign.
- First president to attend and open the FIFA World Cup while in office (1994).
- First president to address the AIPAC while in office.
- First president to host and perform in a jazz festival while in office.
- First president to attend the US Open while in office.
- First president to visit Ukraine, Belarus, Latvia, Kuwait, the Czech Republic, Bosnia and Herzegovina, Croatia, Denmark, Ghana, Uganda, Rwanda, post-apartheid South Africa, Botswana, Senegal, Slovenia, Macedonia, Norway, Bulgaria, Kosovo, Bangladesh, Oman, Tanzania, Brunei, as well as reunited Vietnam while in office
- First president to visit Northern Ireland while in office.
- First president to visit and address the Palestinian National Authority while in office
- First president to visit Panmunjom and the Bridge of no return.
- First president to send an email
- First president to appoint an Asian American to a cabinet post (Norman Mineta)
- First president to establish GPS modernization (Note: While President Reagan first granted civilians access to government GPS technology, President Clinton removed selective availability and granted civilians unrestricted access to GPS satellites, "flipping the blue switch" and unleashing a worldwide revolution in civil and commercial applications, leading to the creation of GPS Block III.)
- First president to attend the World Economic Forum while in office.
- First president to be married to a member of Congress (Note: Clinton's wife Hillary took office as a Senator from New York on January 3, 2001, which was 17 days before Clinton's eight-year tenure as president ended.)

== George W. Bush (2001–2009) ==
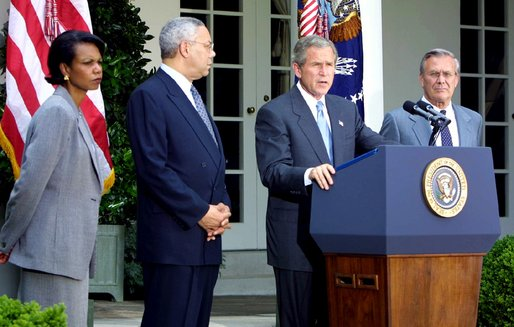
President Bush, Secretary Powell, Advisor Rice, and Secretary Rumsfeld

- First president born in Connecticut
- First president to have an MBA
- First president to have completed a marathon.
- First president to be the known parent of twin children. (Barbara Bush and Jenna Bush Hager)
- First president whose election victory was decided by the Supreme Court (Bush v. Gore)
- First president to have a State of the Union live broadcast on the Internet.
- First president to nominate an African American for secretary of state (Colin Powell)
- First president to nominate an African American woman for secretary of state (Condoleezza Rice)
- First president to deliver a radio address in Spanish (The weekly radio address on Cinco de Mayo in 2001 was delivered both in English and Spanish.)
- First president to have a 90% approval rating in the history of modern political polling
- First president to attend a Papal funeral while in office (death and funeral of Pope John Paul II)
- First president to publicly support a two state solution.
- First president to open the Winter Olympic Games (the 2002 Winter Olympics in Salt Lake City) while in office
- First president to deliver a State of the Union Address presided over by a female Speaker of the United States House of Representatives (Nancy Pelosi during the 2007 State of the Union Address).
- First president to attend the Olympic Games in a foreign country (the 2008 Summer Olympics in Beijing) while in office
- First president to leave office with both parents still alive (Note: Bush left office in 2009, while both his parents died in 2018.)
- First president to celebrate Diwali
- First president to visit Sweden, Lithuania, Qatar, Iraq, Slovakia, Georgia, Mongolia, Estonia, Albania, Bahrain, the United Arab Emirates, and Benin while in office
- First president to eulogize a former president who was also his father

== Barack Obama (2009–2017) ==
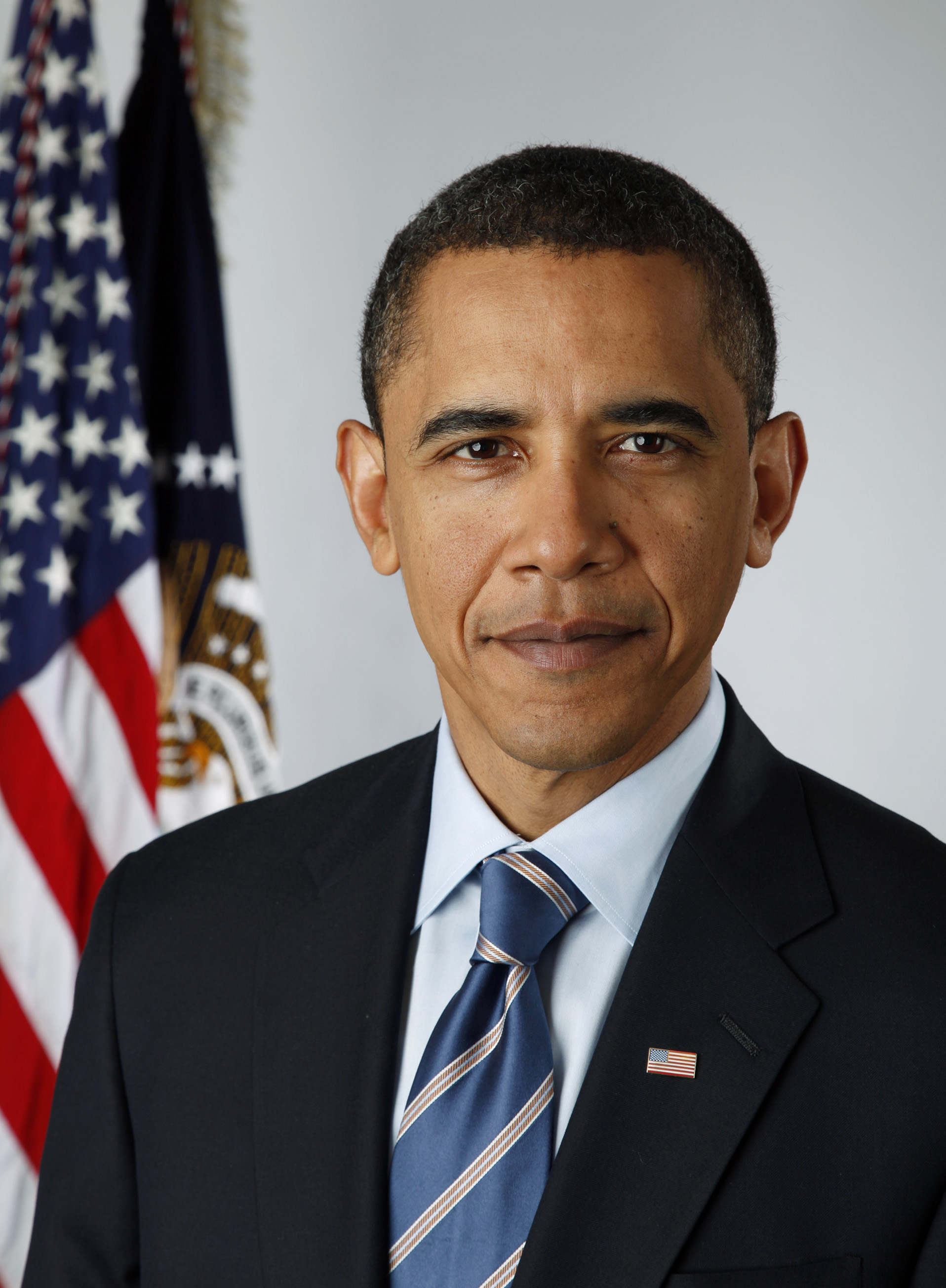
The official portrait of Barack Obama (2009). Taken on a Canon EOS 5D Mark II

- First president born outside of the 48 contiguous states
- First president born in Hawaii
- First president to be multiethnic; his European-American mother was from Kansas and his African father was from Kenya.
- First African American president
- First Kenyan American president.
- First president to have served as president of the Harvard Law Review.
- First president to speak Indonesian (President Obama was able to converse in Indonesian when living in Jakarta from 1967 to 1971).
- First president to have a Catholic vice president (Joe Biden)
- First president to appoint a former first lady to the cabinet (Hillary Clinton as secretary of state).
- First president to publicly endorse same-sex marriage
- First president to nominate a woman for chair of the Federal Reserve (Janet Yellen)
- First president to appoint a Latino American to the Supreme Court (Sonia Sotomayor)
- First president to visit a federal prison
- First president to receive the Israeli Presidential Medal of Honour.
- First president to have his official photograph portrait taken with a digital camera.
- First president to light a diya for Diwali at the White House
- First president to address the African Union while in office
- First president to have visited the Arctic Circle while in office
- First president to visit Hiroshima, Japan, the location where the U.S. dropped the first atomic bomb used in warfare in 1945
- First president to write a scholarly article in a scholarly journal while president
- First president to visit an independent Trinidad and Tobago, Cambodia, Myanmar, Kenya, Ethiopia, and Laos while in office
- First president to visit Wales while in office.
- First president to attend Hannover Messe while in office.
- First president to make his presidential library digital, as opposed to a physical facility.
- First president to appear on a podcast while in office

== Donald Trump (2017–2021, 2025–present) ==
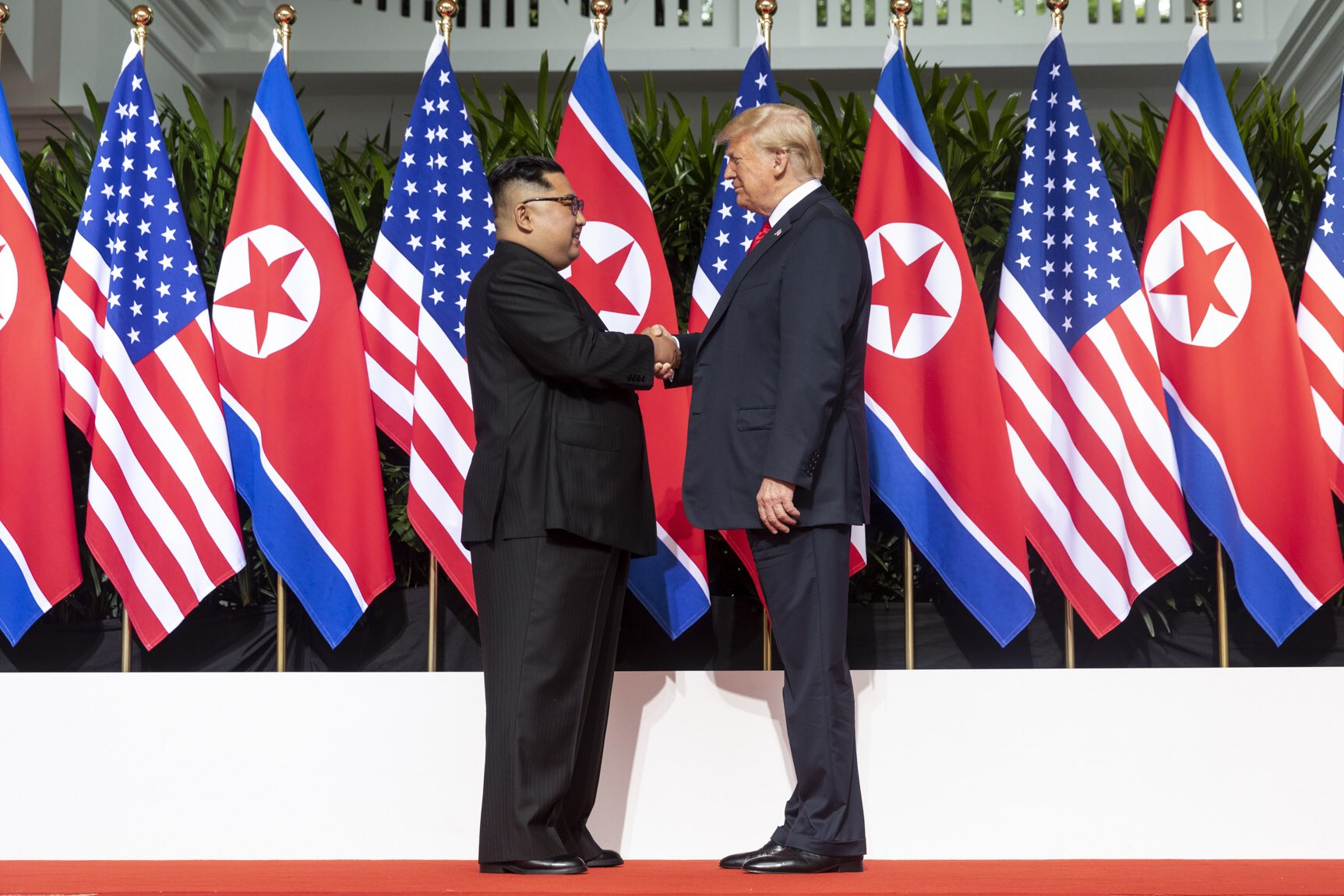
Donald Trump shaking hands with North Korean leader Kim Jong Un on June 12, 2018, the first U.S. president to do so

- First president to assume the office without having had any prior public service experience, military or political
- First president to be a resident of Florida
- First president to launch his own cryptocurrency ($Trump)
- First president to own a social media platform (Truth Social)
- First president presumed to be a billionaire prior to assuming office
- First president to have a personal YouTube channel and reach 1 million subscribers
- First president to have children from three different wives
- First president to have an Orthodox Jewish rabbi (Marvin Hier) give a benediction at his inauguration
- First president to begin tenure with a net negative approval rating in the history of modern political polling
- First president to visit the Western Wall while in office
- First president to meet with two emperors of Japan while in office (Akihito and Naruhito)
- First president to meet with the supreme leader of North Korea while in office (President Trump met Kim Jong Un during the 2018 North Korea–United States Singapore Summit).
- First president to cross over the DMZ and enter North Korea while in office (2019 Koreas–United States DMZ Summit)
- First president to be impeached twice by the House of Representatives (in 2019 and in 2021)
- First president to have a Senate impeachment trial after his presidency (February 2021)
- First president to run for reelection (2020) and to be reelected after being impeached (2024)
- First president to be permanently banned from a social media platform (Twitter); however, the ban was lifted after a change in ownership.
- First president to send a presidential text alert (in this case as a test) through the National Wireless Emergency Alert System
- First president to directly oversee private spaceflight in the United States
- First president to not personally hand over the nuclear football to his successor since its inception.
- First president to be elected as a candidate from Florida (President Trump moved his residence from New York to Florida in 2019 and was elected as the first Floridian to become president in 2024).
- First president to invite foreign heads of state or government to an inauguration.
- First president to attend the Super Bowl while in office (Super Bowl LIX)
- First president to remove his predecessor's appointed board members at the Kennedy Center, as well as the first president to be elected chairman of the center
- First president to have two official state visits to the United Kingdom (2019, 2025).
- First president to pardon a corporation (Paul Weiss)
- First president to attend a UFC competition while in office.
- First president to visit the Sheikh Zayed Grand Mosque while in office.
- First president to invoke Section 740 of the Home Rule Act of 1973 and federalize the Metropolitan Police Department of the District of Columbia.
- First president to have a presidential library being built at a public college (Miami Dade College).
- First president to dismiss an appointed member of the Federal Reserve Board of Governors.
- First president to attend the Ryder Cup while in office.
- First president to be awarded the Grand Order of Mugunghwa.
- First president to host the C5+1 format at the White House.
- First president to host the President of Syria at the White House (President Trump hosted President Al-Sharaa on November 10, 2025).
- First president to receive the FIFA Peace Prize.
- First president to sign a United States Dollar bill while in office (historically, U.S. Dollar bank notes have been signed by the United States Secretary of the Treasury and the United States Treasurer).
- First president to attend an oral hearing at the Supreme Court while in office.
- First president to refer to China as a Superpower.
- First president to attend the NBA Finals while in office (2026 NBA Finals).
- First president to host a professional sports event at a presidential residence (UFC Freedom 250 was held on the South Lawn of the White House on June 14, 2026).
- First president to be featured on a US passport while in office.
- First president to attend the final of a FIFA World Cup while in office (President Trump attended the Final of the 2026 World Cup).
- First president to speak at a midterm convention for the Republican Party (the 2026 Republican National Convention).

=== Campaign ===
- First president to be elected after his 70th birthday.
- First president to be re-elected over the age of 75, as he was 78 years old when he was re-elected in 2024.
- First person to win the presidency by defeating a female nominee for president (Hillary Clinton nominated by the Democrats).
- First president to have a female campaign manager (Kellyanne Conway, 2016) as well as to have two different ones (Susie Wiles, 2024)
- First president to attend and speak at the Libertarian National Convention (2024) and the first to have spoken at a convention for an opposing political party
- First former president to participate in a televised presidential debate against an incumbent president (Joe Biden, June 2024).
- First former president to participate in a televised presidential debate against an incumbent vice president (Kamala Harris, September 2024).

=== Prosecutions ===
- First president to be indicted by a grand jury in a state case (March 2023).
- First president to be indicted by a grand jury in a federal case (June 2023).
- First president to be indicted by a grand jury in a federal case for actions taken while in office (August 2023).
- First president to stand trial for state criminal charges (April 2024).
- First president to be found guilty of committing felony offenses (May 2024; falsifying business records).
- First president to be sentenced for a felony offense (January 2025; unconditional discharge).
- First president to have a police booking photograph taken of him (August 2023), as well as display said photograph in the White House (January 2025).

=== Cabinet ===
- First president to appoint an Indian American to a cabinet-level position (Nikki Haley, as ambassador to the United Nations, 2017)
- First president to appoint an openly gay person to serve in an acting cabinet-level position (Richard Grenell, as director of national intelligence, 2020)
- First president to appoint an openly gay person as secretary of the treasury (Scott Bessent, 2025).
- First president to appoint a female White House chief of staff (Susie Wiles, 2025)
- First president to appoint a Latino American as secretary of state (Marco Rubio, 2025)
- First president to appoint a Pacific Islander American and Hindu to a cabinet-level position (Tulsi Gabbard, as director of national intelligence, 2025)
- First president to have a vice president cast a tie breaking vote for a cabinet nominee (Betsy DeVos, as secretary of education, 2017)
- First president to have a separate vice president cast a tie breaking vote for a cabinet nominee (Pete Hegseth, as secretary of defense, 2025)
- First president to have a Millennial, Marine, and War on Terror veteran serve as vice president (JD Vance).
- First president to appoint a Native American as secretary of homeland security (Markwayne Mullin, 2026)

=== Other appointments ===
- First president to appoint a Hasidic Jew to an U.S. administration position requiring Senate confirmation (Mitchell Silk, 2020)
- First president to appoint an African American as a service chief of the United States Armed Forces (Charles Q. Brown Jr., as chief of staff of the Air Force, 2020)
- First president to appoint an Indian American and Hindu as director of the Federal Bureau of Investigation (Kash Patel, 2025)

== Joe Biden (2021–2025) ==
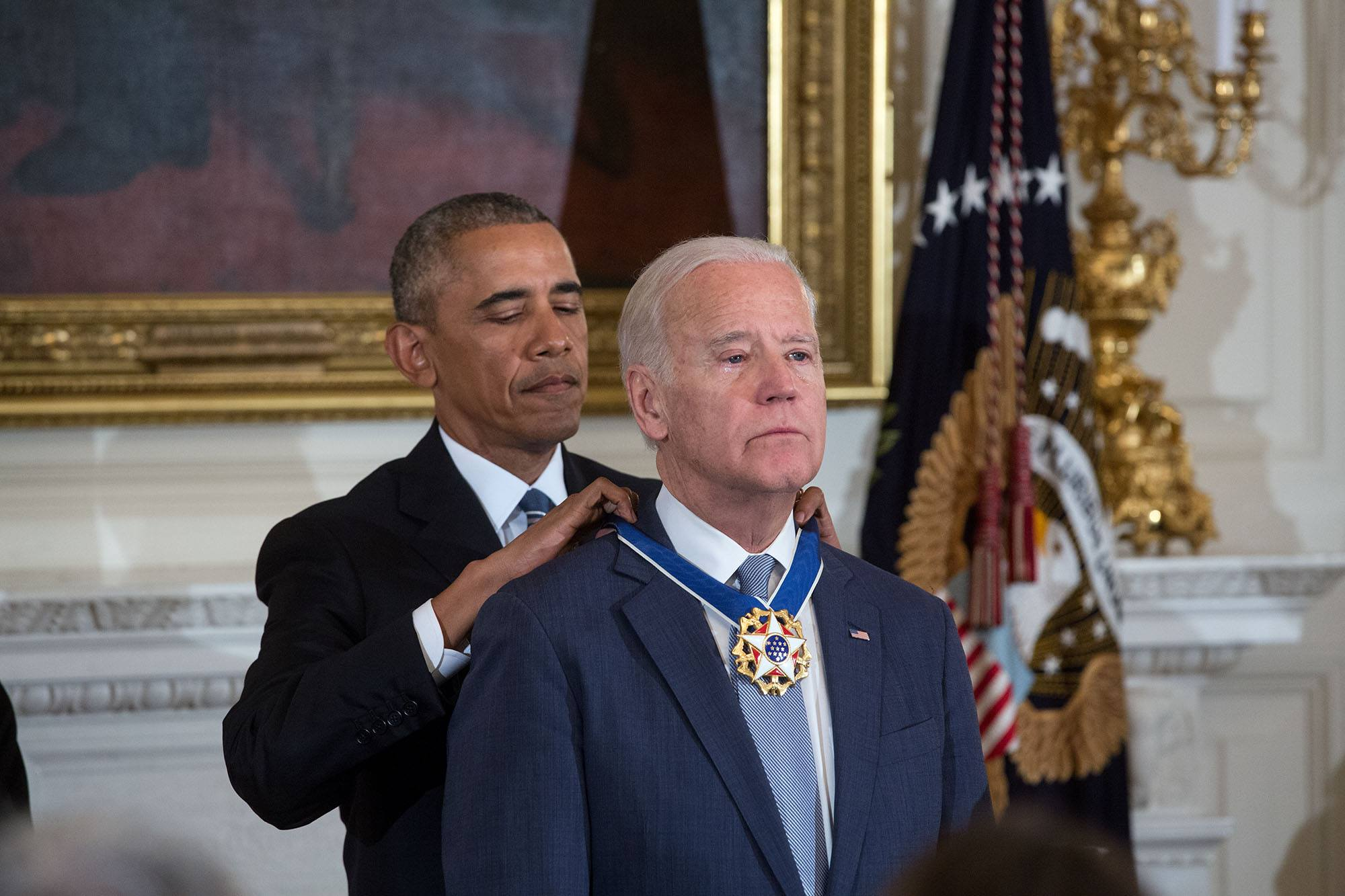
Biden receiving the Medal of Freedom on January 12, 2017, four years prior to his inauguration in 2021, the first U.S. president to do so.

- First president to hold the office over the age of 78 (Note: Biden was 78 years and 61 days old when he was sworn in as president, beating the previous age record held by Ronald Reagan, who was 77 years and 349 days old on his last day as president.) and then turn 80 while in office.
- First president to be a member of the Silent Generation
- First president to have served as a senator for over 35 years
- First president to receive the Presidential Medal of Freedom prior to taking office
- First president to have a sign language interpreter participate in White House press briefings daily
- First president to formally recognize the Armenian genocide
- First president to formally recognize Indigenous Peoples' Day
- First president to attend the Maccabiah Games
- First president to meet with two British monarchs while in office (Queen Elizabeth II and King Charles III)
- First president to travel to an active conflict zone not controlled by the United States military (Ukraine)
- First president to join a picket line while in office
- First president to bring a rescue dog to the White House (Major)
- First president to have one of his children convicted in a criminal trial while in office
- First president to participate in a televised debate against a former president (Donald Trump) and first to do so while in office
- First president to be subject to the presidential immunity doctrine established in Trump v. United States (2024)
- First president to suspend their re-election campaign after winning their party's primary
- First president to visit the Amazon rainforest while in office
- First president to visit Cape Verde and Angola while in office
- First president to grant a pardon to his child
- First president to become a first-time great-grandfather while in office
- First president to write an Oval Office letter to and receive one from their successor and predecessor who were both the same person (Donald Trump)

=== Cabinet ===
- First president to serve with a female, Black, Asian American, Indian American, and Tamil American vice president (Kamala Harris)
- First president to appoint an openly gay person confirmed by the Senate to serve in a cabinet position (Pete Buttigieg, as secretary of transportation)
- First president to appoint a Native American as a cabinet secretary (Deb Haaland, as secretary of the interior)
- First president to appoint an African American as secretary of defense (Lloyd Austin)
- First president to appoint a Latino American as secretary of health and human services (Xavier Becerra)
- First president to appoint a female director of national intelligence (Avril Haines)
- First president to appoint a Latino American as secretary of homeland security (Alejandro Mayorkas)
- First president to appoint a female secretary of the treasury (Janet Yellen)

=== Other appointments ===
- First president to appoint an openly transgender federal official confirmed by the Senate (Rachel Levine, as Assistant Secretary for Health)
- First president to appoint an African American woman to the Federal Reserve Board of Governors (Lisa Cook).
- First president to appoint an African American and openly gay female White House press secretary (Karine Jean-Pierre)
- First president to have the National Security Council include an official dedicated to climate change (John Kerry, as special presidential envoy for climate)
- First president to have a national climate advisor (Gina McCarthy)
- First president to appoint an African American to lead the United States Environmental Protection Agency (Michael S. Regan)
- First president to appoint a Muslim American as an Article III judge (Zahid Quraishi)
- First president to appoint a female and Asian American United States trade representative (Katherine Tai)
- First president to appoint a Black woman and former federal public defender to the Supreme Court (Ketanji Brown Jackson)

== See also ==
- List of First Lady of the United States firsts

== Sources ==
- Brands, Henry William (1997), TR: The Last Romantic (full biography), New York: Basic Books, ISBN 978-0-465-06958-3, OCLC 36954615.
- Hardesty, Von. Air Force One: The Aircraft that Shaped the Modern Presidency. Chanhassen, Minnesota: Northword Press, 2003. ISBN 1-55971-894-3.
- Leech, Margaret (1959). In the Days of McKinley. New York: Harper and Brothers. pp. 594–600. OCLC 456809.
- Miller, Nathan (1992). Theodore Roosevelt: A Life. William Morrow & Co. ISBN 9780688067847..
- Pringle, Henry F. (1998) [First published 1939]. The Life and Times of William Howard Taft: A Biography. Vol. 1 (2008 reprint ed.). Newtown, CT: American Political Biography Press. ISBN 978-0-945707-20-2.
- Pringle, Henry F. (1998) [First published 1939]. The Life and Times of William Howard Taft: A Biography. Vol. 2 (2008 reprint ed.). Newtown, CT: American Political Biography Press. ISBN 978-0-945707-19-6.
- Estin, Blake; George Magazine (1998). The Book of Political Lists. Villard. ISBN 978-0-375750-11-3.
