= Culottes =

Woman's split skirt; earlier, breeches or knickers

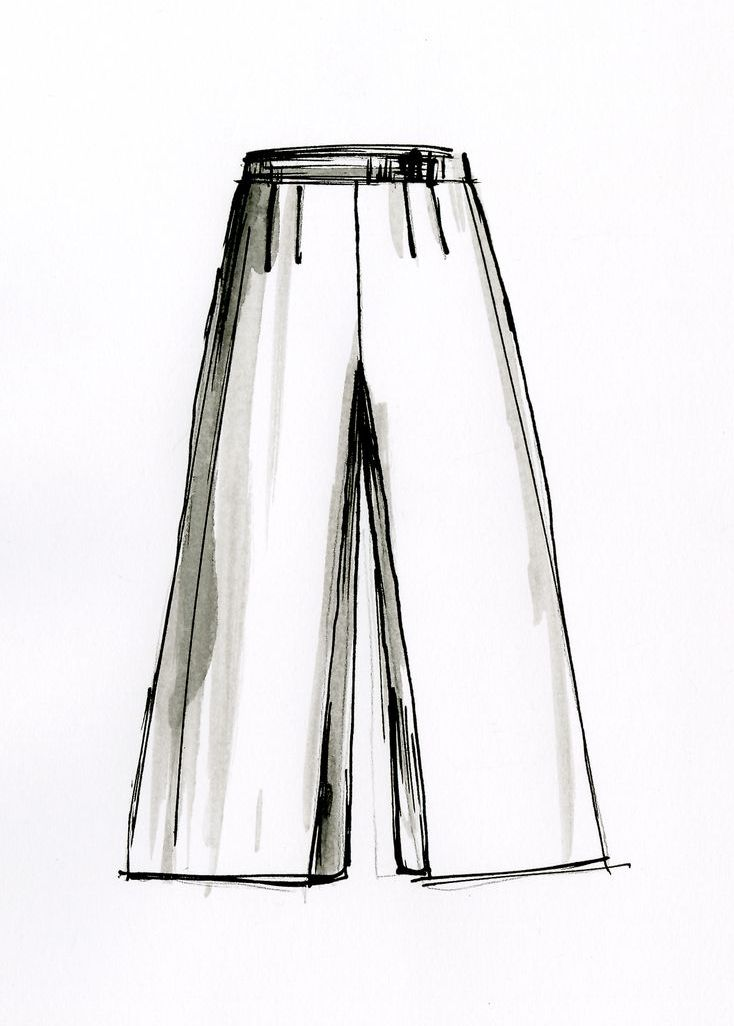
- Sketch of culottes
- Type: Pair of shorts that look like a skirt, or shorts with a skirt-like panel in front and back
- Material: fabric

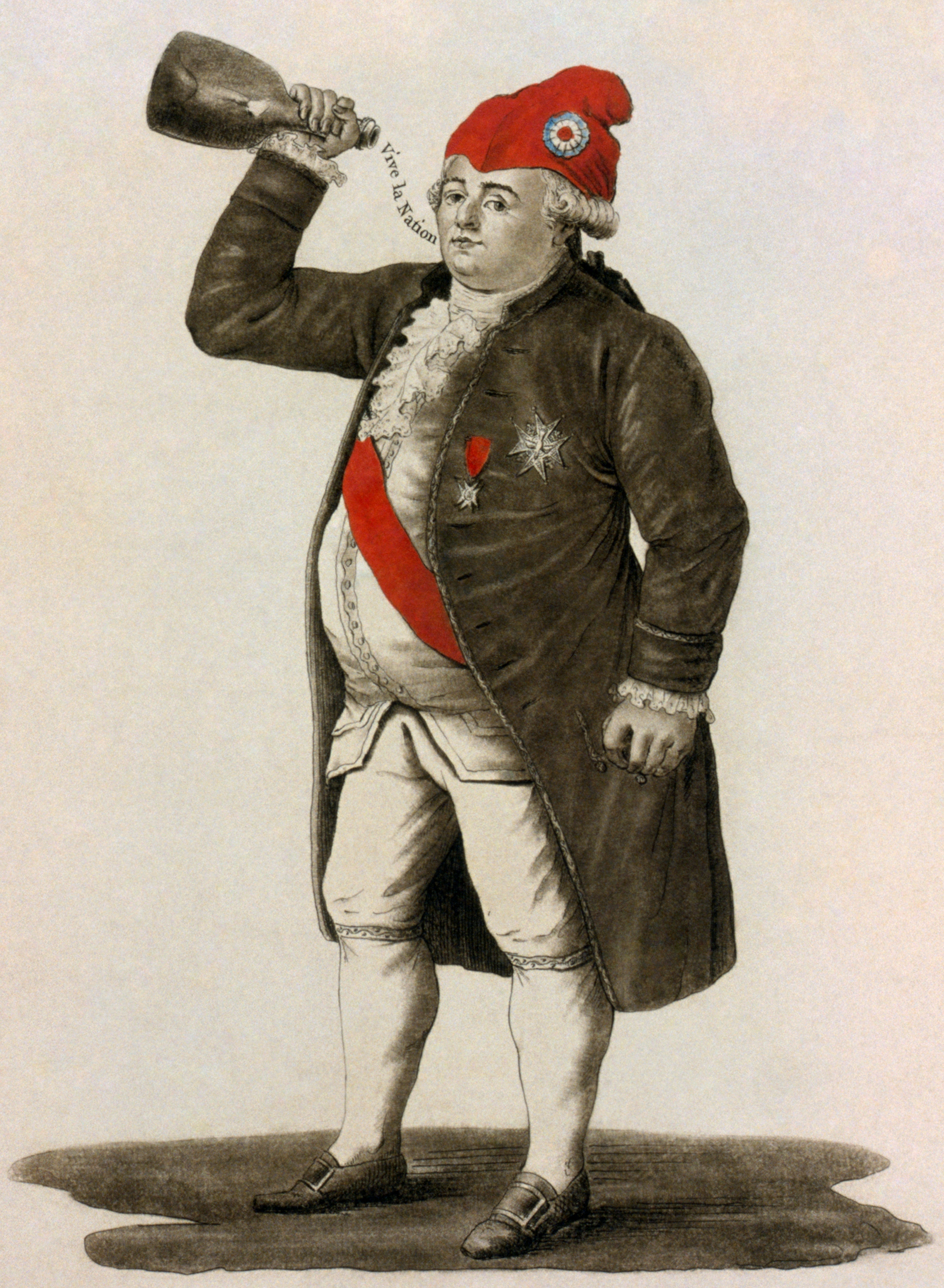
King Louis XVI (1754-1793), dressed in culottes.

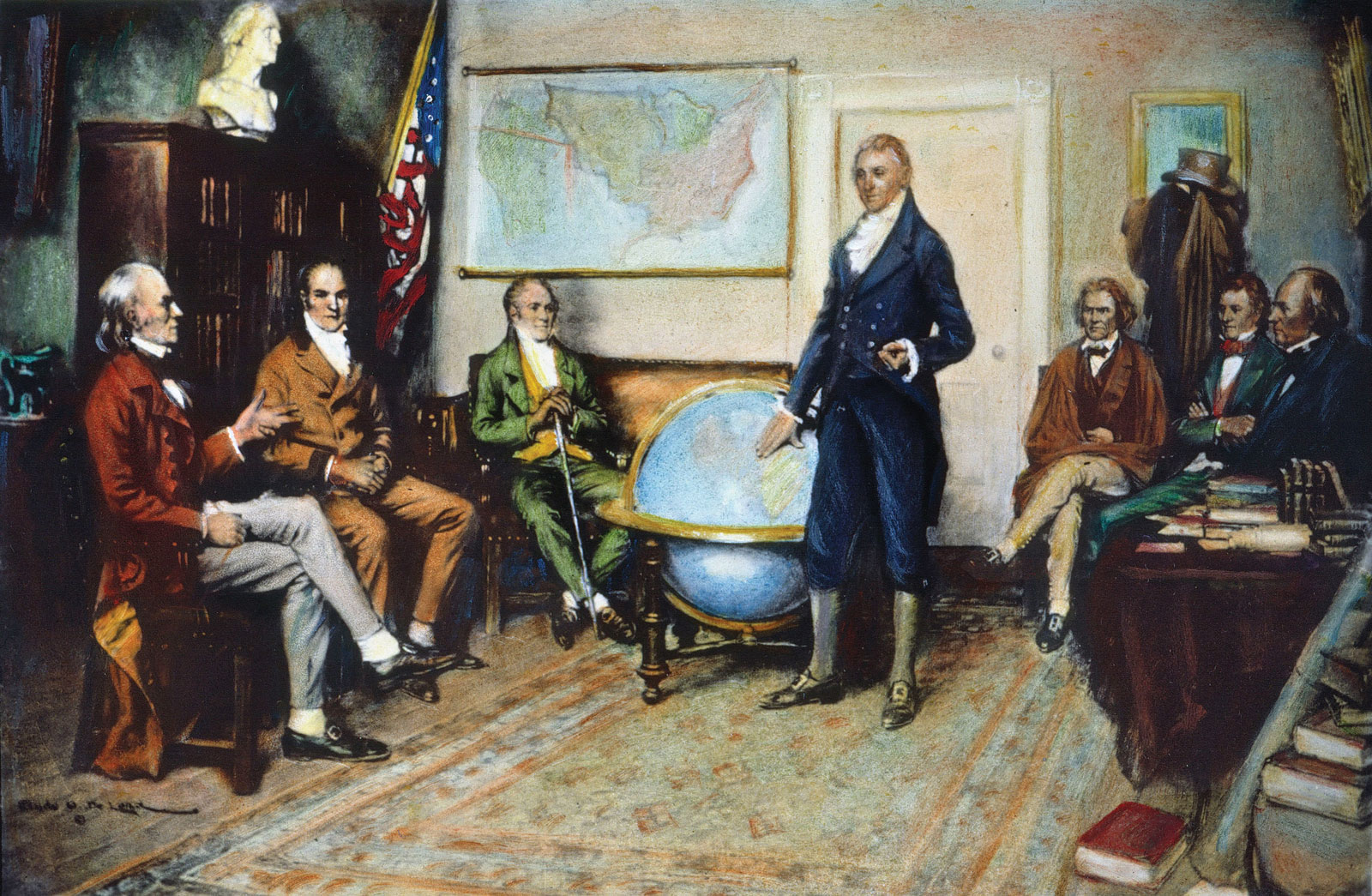
James Monroe (1758-1831), the last U.S. president who dressed according to the style of the late 18th century, with his Cabinet in 1823. The president wears knee breeches, while his secretaries (including the future president John Quincy Adams, sitting first from left) wear long trousers.

Culottes are an item of clothing worn on the lower half of the body. The term can refer to either split skirts, historical men's breeches, or women's underpants. The culotte is an example of a fashion-industry word taken from designs across history, languages and cultures, then being used to describe different garments, often creating confusion among historians and readers. The French word culotte is (a pair of) panties, pants, knickers, trousers, shorts, or (historically) breeches; derived from the French word culot, meaning the lower half of a thing, the lower garment in this case.

In English-speaking history, culottes were originally the knee-breeches commonly worn by gentlemen of the European upper-classes from the late Middle Ages or Renaissance through the early 19th century. The style of tight trousers ending just below the knee was popularized in France during the reign of Henry III (1574–1589). Culottes were normally closed and fastened about the leg, to the knee, by buttons, a strap and buckle, or a draw-string. During the French Revolution of 1789–1799, working-class revolutionaries were known as "sans-culottes" – literally, "without culottes" – a name derived from their rejection of aristocratic apparel.

In the United States, only the first five presidents, from George Washington (1732-1799) through James Monroe (1758-1831), wore culottes according to the style of the late 18th century. John Quincy Adams (1767-1848) wore long trousers instead of knee breeches at his inaugural ceremony in 1825, thus becoming the first president to have made the change of dress.

== In military uniforms ==
European military uniforms incorporated culottes as a standard uniform article, the lower leg being covered by either stockings, leggings, or knee-high boots. Culottes were a common part of military uniforms during the European wars of the eighteenth-century (the Great Northern War, the War of the Spanish Succession, the War of the Austrian Succession, the Seven Years' War, the French and Indian War, and the Revolutionary War).

Historical Japanese field workers and military samurai wore hakama that were sometimes tight at the bottom as French military culottes. Wider bifurcated wrap-skirt hakama were for horse-back riding. Eighteenth and nineteenth-century European women introduced culottes cut with a pattern looking like long hakama, hiding their legs while riding horses. Today Aikido and Kendo masters wear long hakama, to hide their feet from opponents.

== Hassidic clothing ==
Jews in Poland wore culottes with high socks from around the 1800s. Culottes were abandoned among non-Hassidim in the mid-1900s to early 20th century (due to upheavals in traditional Jewish life in those times), but ended up staying customary only among Hassidim, who continue to wear them today. However, culottes are not worn by Russian Hassidic sects, such as Karlin and Chabad.

Different sects of Hassidim have different customs as to when and how they are worn, and whether and how unmarried men wear them on Shabbos and Jewish holidays, or if they wear them at all.

== Culottes for women ==
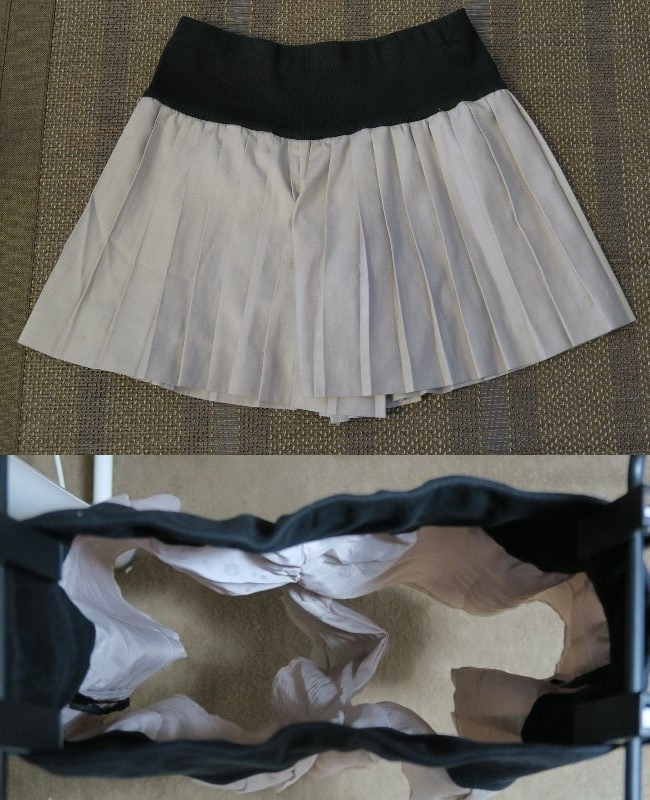
A view of a white knife-pleated culotte skirt with black waistband, and a top-down view of the garment interior showing the shorts-leg division.

Culottes can also describe a split or bifurcated skirt or any garment which "hangs like a skirt, but is actually pants." During the Victorian Era (mid- to late-nineteenth century European culture) long split skirts were developed for horseback riding so that women could sit astride a horse with a safer saddle, like that used by men in that era, rather than riding on a side-saddle designed for the women in that era, that elevated style or 'modesty' over safety. Horse-riding culottes for women were controversial because they were used to break a sexual taboo against women riding horses astride when they were expected to hide their lower limbs at all times. Later, split skirts were developed to provide women more freedom to do other activities as well, such as gardening, cleaning, bike riding, etc. and still look like one is wearing a skirt.

During the 1960s, some upscale restaurants resisted modern fashion trends by refusing to admit women wearing pants, which were considered inappropriate by some proprietors. This posed a problem for women who did not want to wear the skirt styles that were then in fashion. Some women opted to circumvent restaurant bans on women in pants by wearing culottes or palazzo pants as evening wear.

Culottes became associated with Princess Diana during the 1980s.

In modern English, the use of the word culottes can also mean a close-fitting pair of pants ending at the knees, such as Princess Diana also popularised during the early 1980s. The term is used as such in the United Kingdom and Canada. In this sense, culottes are similar to the American knickerbockers (knickers), except whereas the latter are loose in fit.

=== School uniforms ===
Culottes are used in school uniforms for girls. They can be used along with skirts, or they may be used as a replacement for skirts. Culottes are worn as part of a uniform mainly to primary and middle schools. Culottes were also part of the uniform of UK Brownie Guides up until recently, when the uniform was modernized and the traditional brown culottes (and the navy blue culottes worn by the Girl Guides) were replaced.

=== Contemporary French under-pants ===
The term "culottes" in French is now used to describe women's panties, an article of clothing that has little or no relation to the historic men's culotte breeches, except that in French, calling something "culottes" is like calling them "bottoms". The historical French term "sans-culottes" which was once the rejection of aristocrats' breeches, is now used colloquially to mean the same as an English colloquialism "going commando" or not wearing under-pants.

== See also ==
- Skort
- Bloomers
- Underwear
