= Inauguration of John Quincy Adams =

10th United States presidential inauguration

Presidential inauguration of John Quincy Adams
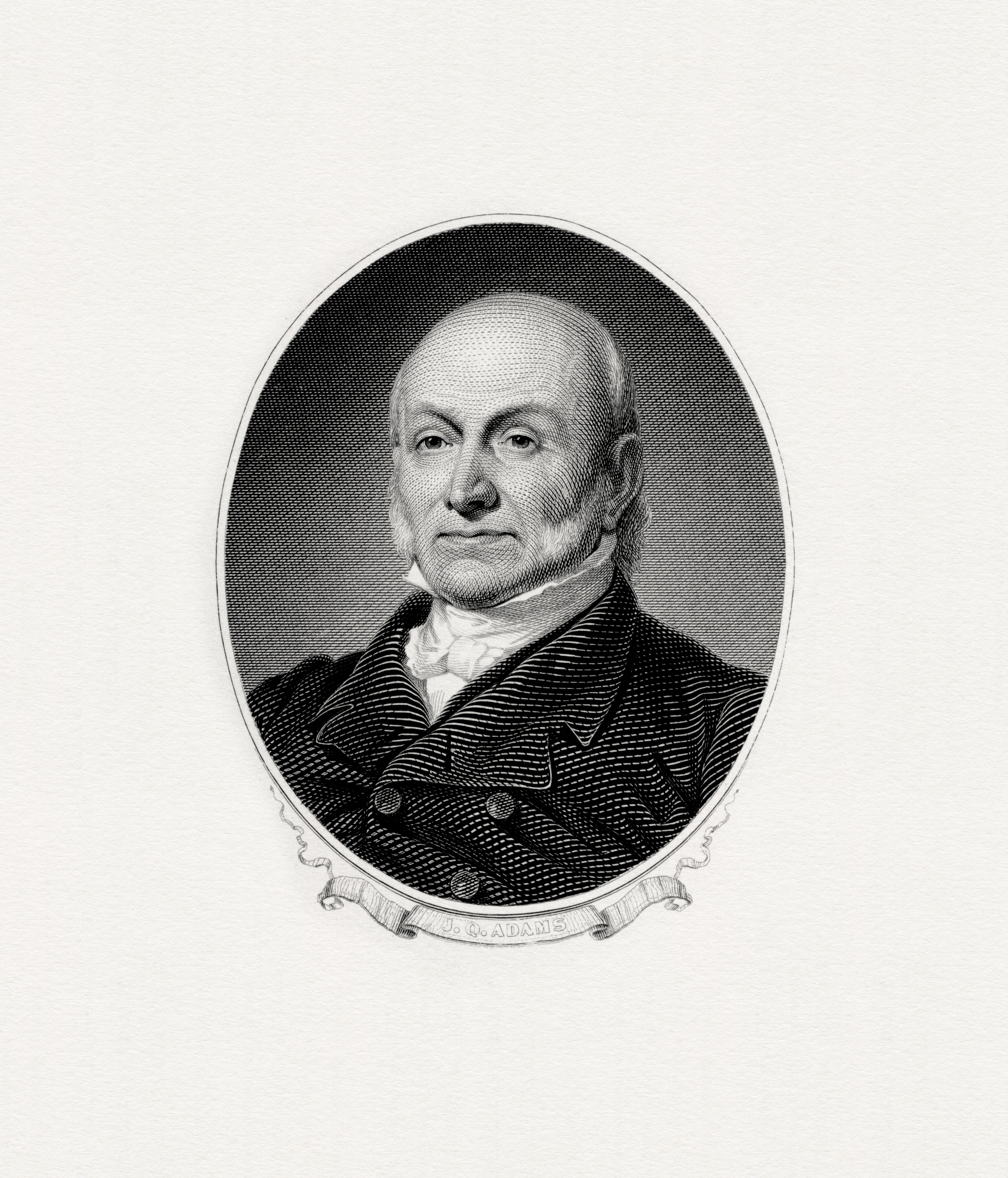
- BEP engraved portrait of Adams as president
- Date: March 4, 1825; 201 years ago
- Location: United States Capitol Washington, D.C.
- Participants: John Quincy Adams; 6th president of the United States — Assuming office John Marshall; Chief Justice of the United States — Administering oath John C. Calhoun; 7th vice president of the United States — Assuming office Unknown — Administering oath

The inauguration of John Quincy Adams as the sixth president of the United States took place on Friday, March 4, 1825, in the House Chamber of the U.S. Capitol in Washington, D.C. The inauguration marked the commencement of the only four-year term of John Quincy Adams as president and the first term of John C. Calhoun as vice president. Adams was the first president to have been the son of a former president–John Adams; and Calhoun, at age 42 on Inauguration Day, was the second-youngest vice president (after Daniel D. Tompkins, who was 3 months younger when inaugurated into office in 1817).

== Background ==
John Quincy Adams was elected president by the House of Representatives after none of the four candidates secured a majority of votes in the electoral college in the 1824 presidential election, as prescribed by the Twelfth Amendment to the Constitution. The outcome was assured when Henry Clay, one of the front-runners, threw his support to Adams so that Andrew Jackson's candidacy would fail. Jackson had polled more popular votes in the election, but he did not gain enough electoral votes to win outright. Adams ran for re-election in 1828, but lost to Jackson.

== Inauguration ==
Chief Justice of the United States John Marshall administered the oath of office to the new president. Adams, as he recalled later, placed his hand upon on a book of law rather than the Bible itself as he recited the oath. This may have been common practice at the time; there is no concrete evidence that any president from John Adams to John Tyler used a Bible to swear the oath upon. His inaugural address was 2,915 words long.

Adams wore a short haircut instead of long hair tied in a queue and long trousers instead of knee breeches, thus becoming the first president who abandoned the fashion of the 18th century and made the change of dress at the inaugural ceremony. The weather that day was described as 'rainy' with a total rainfall of 0.79 inches (20 mm). The estimated noon temperature was 47 °F (8 °C).

== See also ==
- Presidency of John Quincy Adams
- 1824 United States presidential election
