= List of First Lady of the United States firsts =

This list lists achievements and distinctions of various first ladies of the United States. It includes distinctions achieved in their earlier life and post-first lady service.

There have been forty-two official first ladies and forty-five first ladyships. This discrepancy exists because some presidents remarried while in office and President James Buchanan never married.

Also note that first ladies not recognized by the National First Ladies' Library listing include Martha Jefferson Randolph, Emily Donelson, Sarah Yorke Jackson, Angelica Van Buren, Priscilla Tyler, Mary McElroy, Rose Cleveland, Mary McKee, and Margaret Woodrow Wilson.

== Martha Washington ==
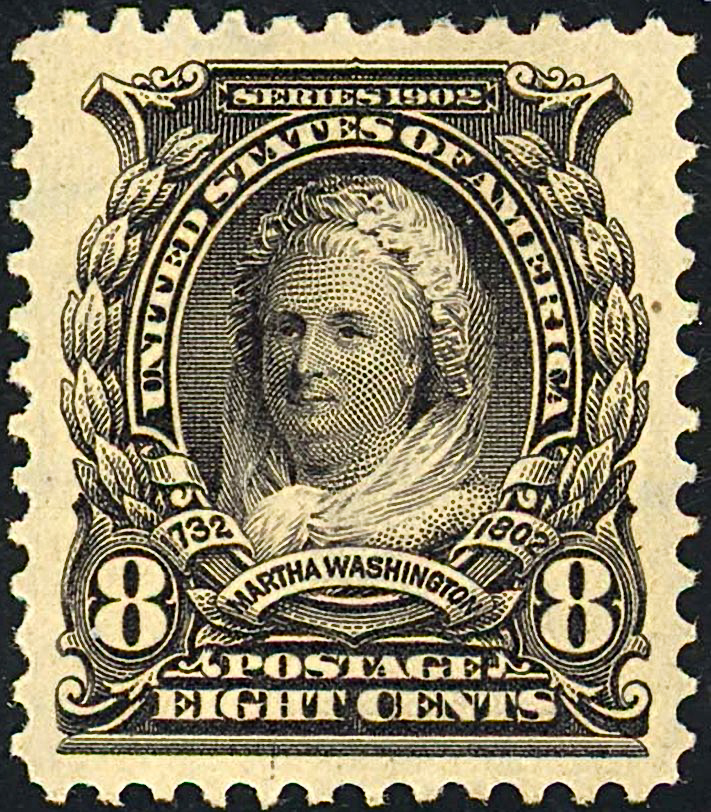
Martha Washington 1902 issue stamp

- First first lady
- First first lady to be born in Virginia
- First first lady to have been born in the 18th century
- First first lady to have had children when she became first lady
- First first lady to outlive her children
- First first lady to outlive her husband
- First first lady to be older than her husband
- First first lady (and first American woman) to appear on a U.S. postage stamp

== Abigail Adams ==
- First first lady to be born in Massachusetts
- First first lady to serve as Second Lady and First Lady on the same day
- First first lady to be younger than her husband
- First first lady to live in the White House
- First first lady to have biological children with a husband who was a president
- First first lady to be the mother of another president (John Quincy Adams)

== Martha Jefferson Randolph ==
- First first lady to not be the wife of the president

== Dolley Madison ==
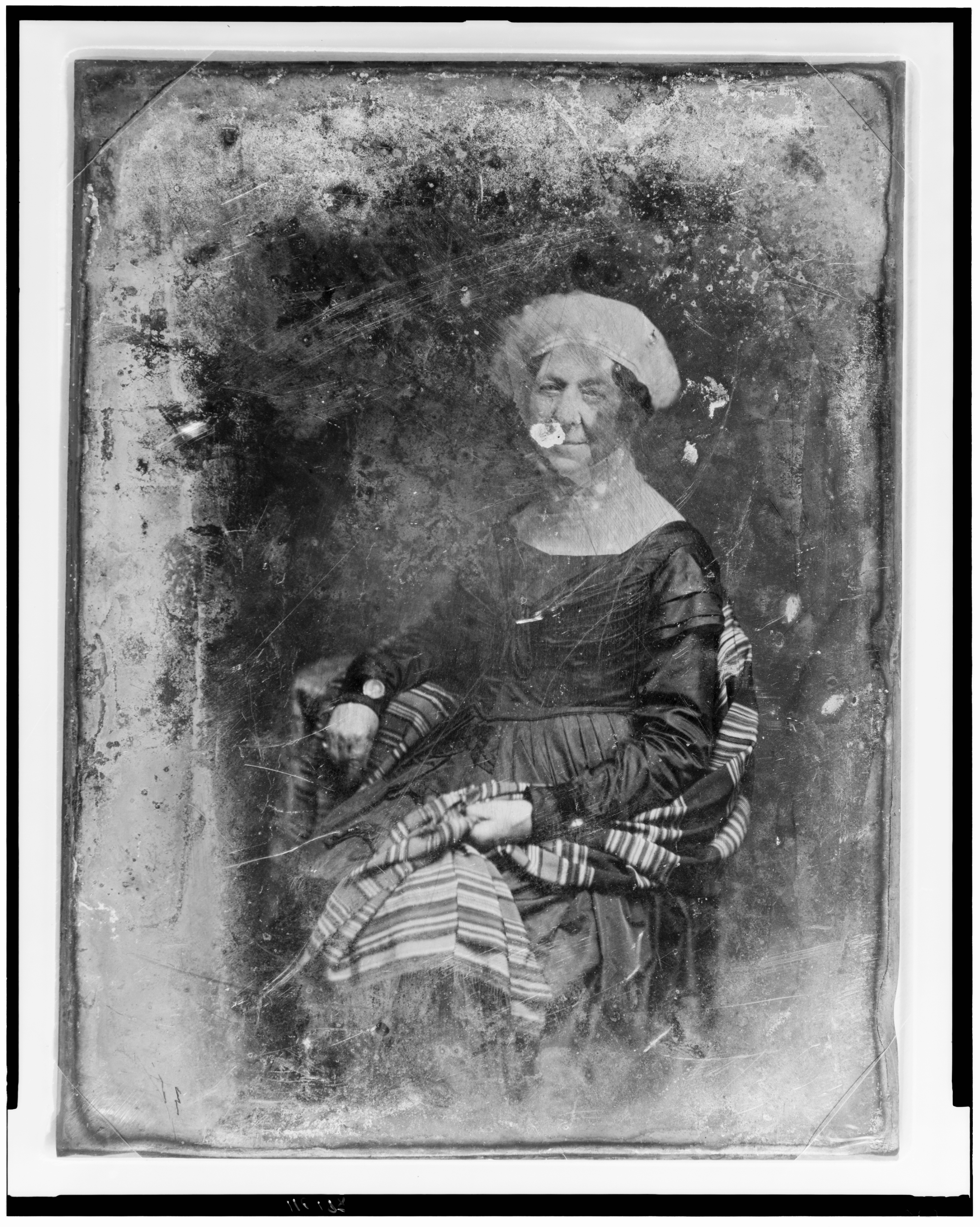
1848 photographic portrait of Dolley Madison

- First first lady to be born in North Carolina
- First first lady to have a parrot as a pet at the White House
- First first lady given an honorary seat on the floor of Congress
- First first lady to respond to a telegraph message
- First first lady to be taller than the president
- First first lady to be photographed
- First first lady to be depicted on the cover of a magazine

== Louisa Adams ==
- First first lady born outside of the United States (She was born in England.)
- First first lady to have both houses of the United States Congress adjourn in mourning on the day of her funeral

== Sarah Yorke Jackson ==
- First first lady born in Pennsylvania

== Anna Harrison ==
- First first lady to be born in New Jersey
- First first lady to be widowed while holding the title
- First first lady to be granted by law a pension as a president's widow
- First first lady to be the grandmother of a president

== Letitia Tyler ==
- First first lady to die in the White House

== Julia Tyler ==
- First first lady to marry a president who was already in office at the time of the wedding

== Abigail Fillmore ==
- First first lady to hold a job while married (she was a teacher)
- First first lady to establish a permanent White House library

== Mary Todd Lincoln ==
- First first lady to be born in Kentucky
- First first lady to hold séances in the White House

== Julia Grant ==
- First first lady to be born in Missouri
- First first lady recorded on film
- First first lady to write her memoirs (The Personal Memoirs of Julia Dent Grant)

== Lucy Hayes ==
- First first lady to be born in Ohio
- First first lady to earn a college degree
- First first lady to ban all alcoholic beverages from the White House
- First first lady to host an Easter Egg roll on the White House lawn

== Frances Cleveland ==
- First first lady to marry in the White House
- First first lady to hold the position of first lady for two nonconsecutive terms
- First first lady to be pregnant at the White House
- First first lady to give birth in the White House

== Caroline Harrison ==
- First first lady to use electricity
- First first lady to raise a Christmas tree in the White House
- First first lady to have written a speech she delivered herself

== Edith Roosevelt ==
- First first lady to be born in Connecticut
- First sitting first lady to travel abroad

== Helen Taft ==
- First first lady to own and drive a car
- First first lady to ride in her husband's inaugural parade
- First first lady to support women's suffrage
- First first lady to publish her memoirs
- First first lady to smoke cigarettes
- First first lady to successfully lobby for safety standards in federal workplaces
- First first lady to plant the first cherry tree saplings that are along Washington, D.C.'s Tidal Basin
- First first lady to be buried in Arlington National Cemetery
- First sitting first lady to turn 50

== Edith Wilson ==
- First first lady to unofficially assume presidential functions

== Florence Harding ==
- First first lady to vote
- First first lady to fly in an airplane
- First first lady to operate a movie camera
- First first lady to own a radio
- First first lady to invite movie stars to the White House

== Grace Coolidge ==
- First first lady to born in Vermont
- First first lady to earn a four-year undergraduate degree
- First first lady to speak in sound newsreels

== Lou Hoover ==
- First first lady to be born in Iowa
- First first lady to make regular nationwide radio broadcasts

== Eleanor Roosevelt ==
- First first lady to hold regular press conferences
- First first lady to write a daily newspaper column and to write a monthly magazine column
- First first lady to host a weekly radio show
- First first lady to fly in an airplane while first lady; she flew with Amelia Earhart in April 1933.
- First first lady to speak at a national party convention (1940)
- First first lady to be depicted as part of a presidential memorial (the Franklin Delano Roosevelt Memorial)
- First first lady (and only) to serve in the role for 12 years (1933–1945)

== Bess Truman ==
- First first lady to live over the age of 90 (Bess Truman lived for 97 years, 247 days.)

== Mamie Eisenhower ==
- First first lady to initiate Halloween decorations to be put up in the White House

== Jacqueline Kennedy ==
- First first lady to hire a press secretary
- First first lady to hire a White House curator
- First first lady to win an Emmy Award
- First first lady to be born in a hospital
- First first lady to select a theme for the White House Christmas tree

== Lady Bird Johnson ==
- First first lady to be born in Texas

== Pat Nixon ==
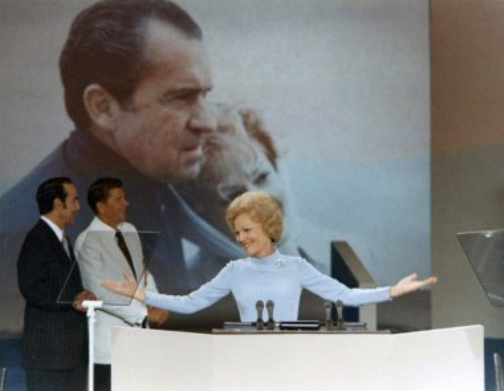
Pat Nixon speaking at the Republican National Convention

- First first lady to be born in Nevada
- First first lady to enter a combat zone
- First first lady to travel to Africa, the People's Republic of China, and the Soviet Union
- First first lady to model trousers in a national magazine
- First first lady to address a Republican National Convention (in 1972)

== Betty Ford ==
- First first lady to be born in Illinois
- First first lady to have a successful battle against dependency on drugs and alcohol, and openly talk about it

== Rosalynn Carter ==
- First first lady to keep her own office in the East Wing
- First first lady to have a VCR in the White House
- First first lady to have been married for over 75 years (Rosalynn and Jimmy Carter were married for 77 years, 135 days.)

== Nancy Reagan ==
- First first lady to be legally adopted by her mother's second husband
- First first lady invited to address the United Nations General Assembly
- First first lady married to a divorcé
- First first lady to attend a British royal wedding
- First sitting first lady to attend an Olympic Games (the 1984 Summer Olympics in Los Angeles)

== Barbara Bush ==
- First first lady to live to see a son become president
- First first lady to have lived at both Number One Observatory Circle and the White House
- First first lady to hire an African-American as her press secretary
- First first lady to throw out a ball to open the baseball season
- First first lady to write a memoir from her dog's perspective
- First first lady to give a live nationally broadcast speech
- First first lady to have been married for over 70 years (Barbara and George H. W. Bush were married for 73 years, 101 days.)

== Hillary Clinton ==
- First first lady to earn a postgraduate degree
- First first lady to have her own professional career up to the time of entering the White House
- First first lady to wear trousers in an official first lady portrait
- First first lady with an office in the West Wing
- First first lady to win a Grammy Award
- First first lady to be subpoenaed to testify before a federal grand jury
- First first lady to run for and to win elected office (for senator from New York in 2000)
- First first lady to march in an LGBT pride parade (2000)
- First first lady to run for president (election in 2008)
- First first lady to be nominated for president by a major U.S. political party (specifically, the Democratic Party, in 2016)
- First first lady to serve as Chancellor at Queen's University Belfast (began 5-year term in January 2020)
- First first lady to be an electoral college elector (election in 2020)

== Laura Bush ==
- First first lady to give birth to twins
- First first lady to substitute for the president in the president's weekly radio address
- First sitting first lady to have a mother-in-law who was also a first lady

== Michelle Obama ==
- First African American first lady
- First first lady to attend an Ivy League university for her undergraduate degree (She majored in sociology and minored in African-American studies at Princeton University.)
- First first lady to announce the winner of an Oscar (Best Picture which went to Argo)
- First first lady to host the Girl Scouts campout at the White House

== Melania Trump ==
- First first lady not to have been born a citizen of the United States or in what would later become the United States (Note: Though Louisa Adams was born outside of the United States, she was the daughter of an American father - Joshua Johnson, the American Consul in London - and American citizenship was, therefore, her birthright.) (She was naturalized in 2006.)
- First first lady to be fluent in a Slavic language (Slovene)
- First first lady to fly in a V-22 Osprey aircraft
- First first lady to visit Malawi
- First first lady to assume the position of first lady at two nonconsecutive inaugurations (2017, 2025)
- First first lady to have two official state visits to the United Kingdom (2019, 2025)
- First first lady to non-consecutively donate two inaugural gowns to the Smithsonian Institution
- First first lady to preside over a United Nations Security Council meeting
- First first lady to host representatives from 45 nations at the White House in a single day
- First first lady to receive the Order of Princess Olga
- First sitting first lady to have a self-produced documentary released in theaters

== Jill Biden ==
- First first lady to have a research doctorate
- First first lady to bring a rescue dog (Major) to the White House
- First first lady to hold a salaried job during the majority of her husband's presidential tenure (Note: The "majority of" qualifier is due to Hillary Clinton, who was a United States senator during the last 17 days of her eight-year stint as first lady.)
- First first lady to carry on with her professional career outside the White House for the majority of her tenure as first lady
- First first lady to attend a British coronation
- First sitting first lady to meet with two British monarchs (Queen Elizabeth II and King Charles III)
- First sitting first lady to reach the age of 70
- First sitting first lady to have one of her stepchildren convicted in a criminal trial
- First sitting first lady to become a step-great-grandmother

== See also ==
- Bibliography of United States presidential spouses and first ladies
- List of United States presidential firsts
