= 1790s in Western fashion =

The 1790s in Western fashion are split between:

- 1775–1795 in Western fashion
- 1795–1820 in Western fashion
