= 1820s in Western fashion =

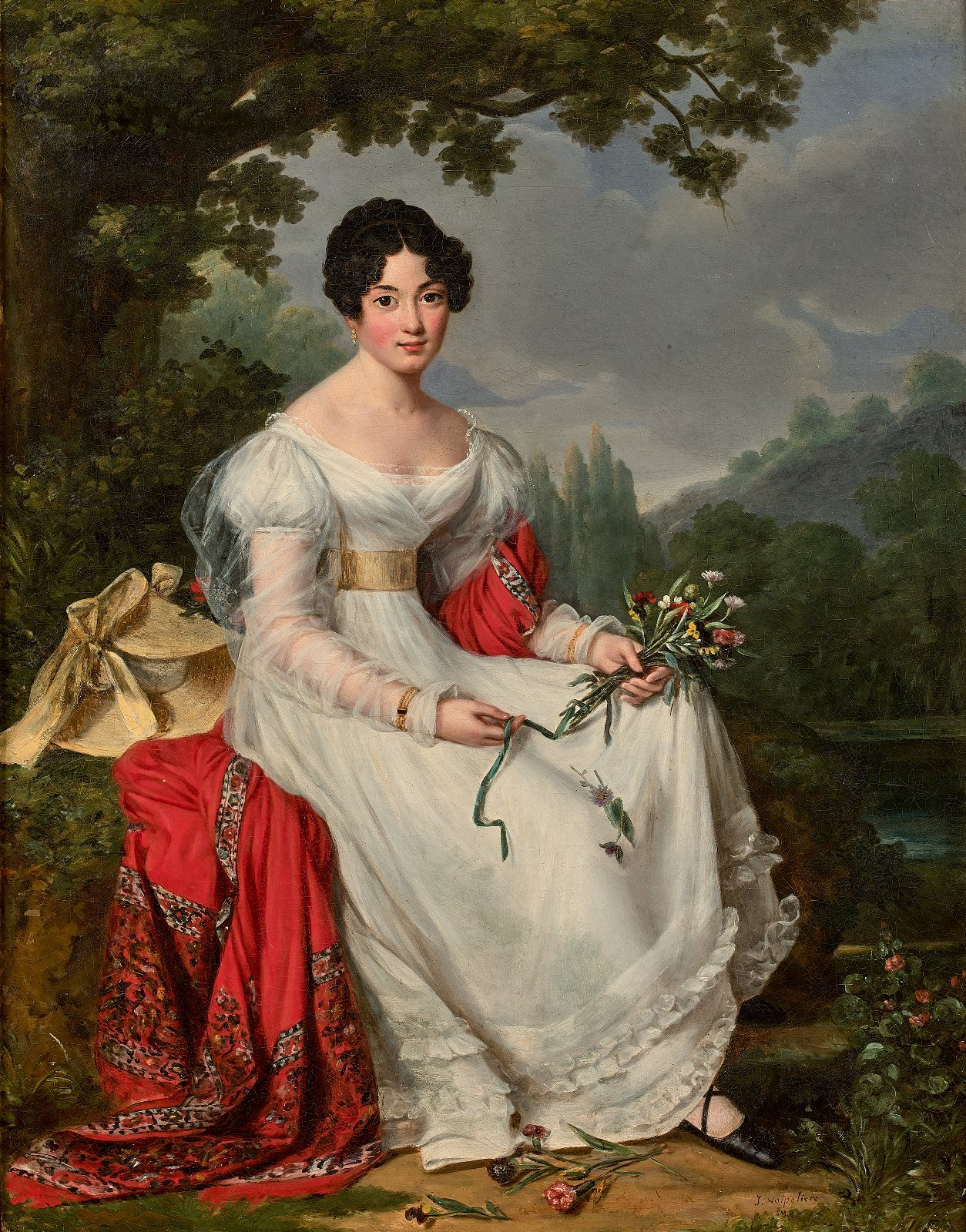
1822 portrait

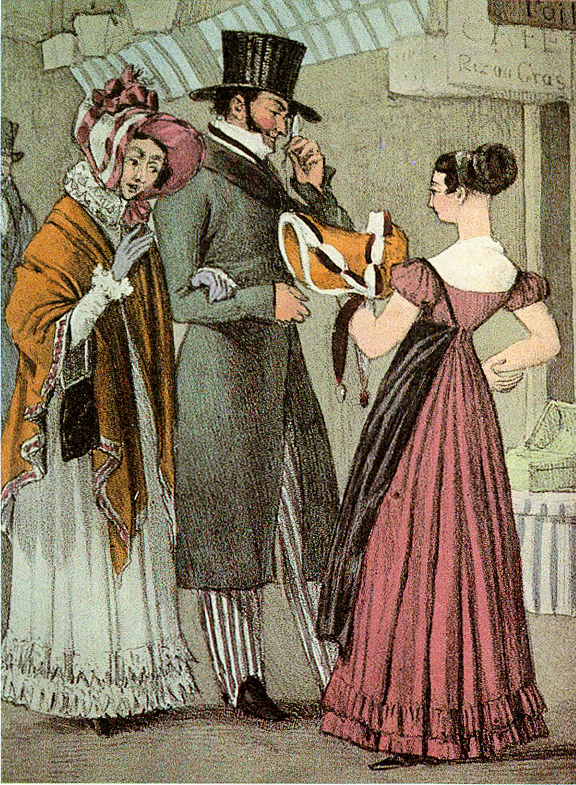
Shopping in Paris, 1822: The woman wears a demure bonnet, a shawl, and gloves over her dress. The man wears a top hat, long coat, tall collar, and striped trousers with straps under his shoes, 1822.

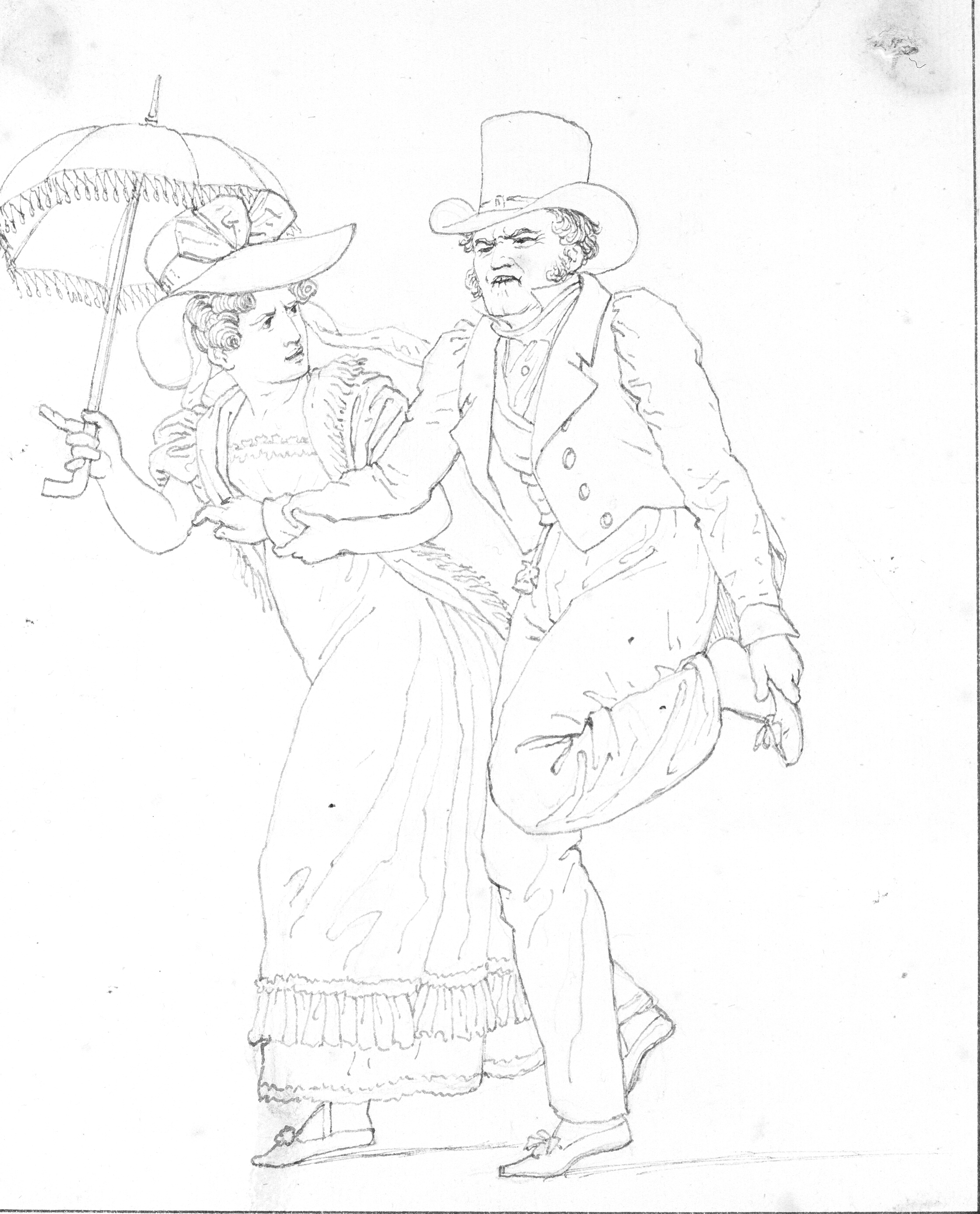
A dressed up couple on a stroll.

During the 1820s in European and European-influenced countries, fashionable women's clothing styles transitioned away from the classically influenced "Empire"/"Regency" styles of c. 1795–1820 (with their relatively unconfining empire silhouette) and re-adopted elements that had been characteristic of most of the 18th century (and were to be characteristic of the remainder of the 19th century), such as full skirts and clearly visible corseting of the natural waist.

The silhouette of men's fashion changed in similar ways: by the mid-1820s coats featured broad shoulders with puffed sleeves, a narrow waist, and full skirts. Trousers were worn for smart day wear, while breeches continued in use at court and in the country.

== Women's fashions ==
=== Overview ===
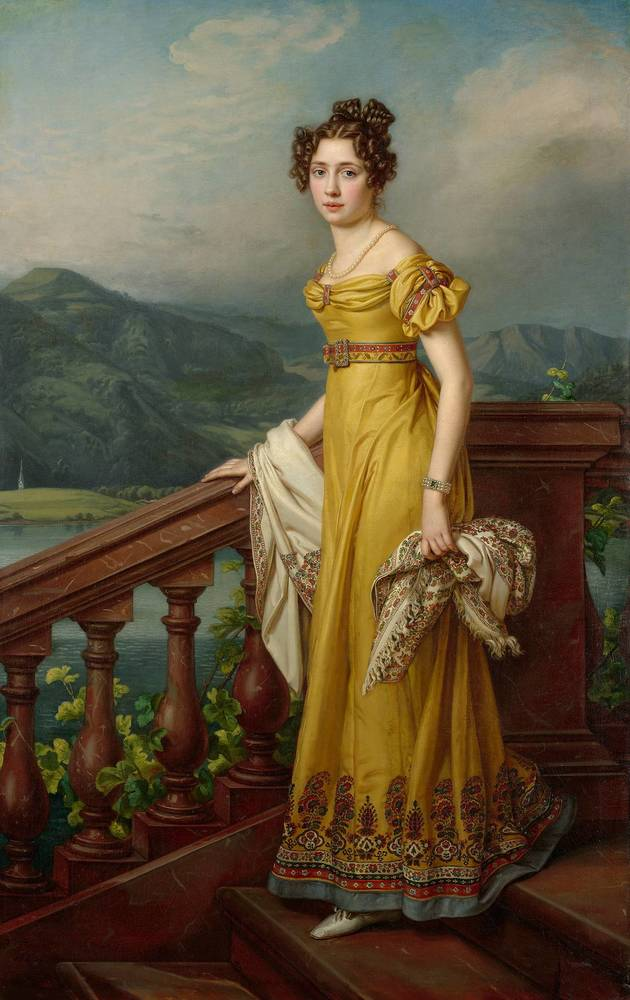
Gown of 1823 features short puffed sleeves and is worn with a patterned shawl. Portrait of Amalie Auguste of Bavaria by Joseph Karl Stieler

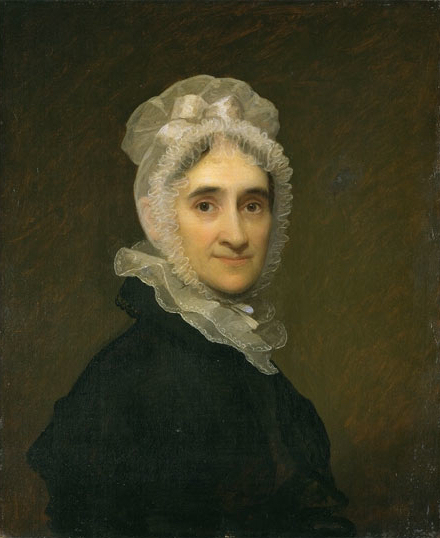
Ruffled collar and sheer linen cap, 1823

During the first half of the 1820s, there were slight gradual modifications of Regency styles, with the position of the waistline trending successively lower than the high waistline of the Regency (just below the breasts), and also further development of the trends of the late 1810s towards giving skirts a somewhat conical silhouette (as opposed to earlier more clinging and free-flowing styles), and in having various types of decoration (sometimes large and ornate) applied horizontally around the dress near the hem. Sleeves also began increasing in size, foreshadowing the styles of the 1830s. However, there was still no radical break with the Empire/Regency aesthetic. Skirts became even wider at the bottom during the 1820s, with more ornamentation and definition toward the bottom of the skirt such as tucks, pleats, ruffles, or loops of silk or fur.

During the second half of the 1820s, this neoclassical aesthetic was decisively repudiated, preparing the way for the main fashion features of the next ten to fifteen years (large sleeves, somewhat strict corseting of the natural waist, full skirts, elaborate large-circumference hats, and visual emphasis on wide sloping shoulders). Rich colors such as chrome yellow and Turkey red became popular, and fabrics with large bold checkerboard or plaid patterns became fashionable, (another contrast with the previous fashion period, which had favored small delicate pastel prints). A bustle was sometimes also worn. Belts accentuated the new defined waist.

Dresses were often worn with a round ruffled linen collar similar to a soft Elizabethan ruff.

=== Hairstyles and headgear ===
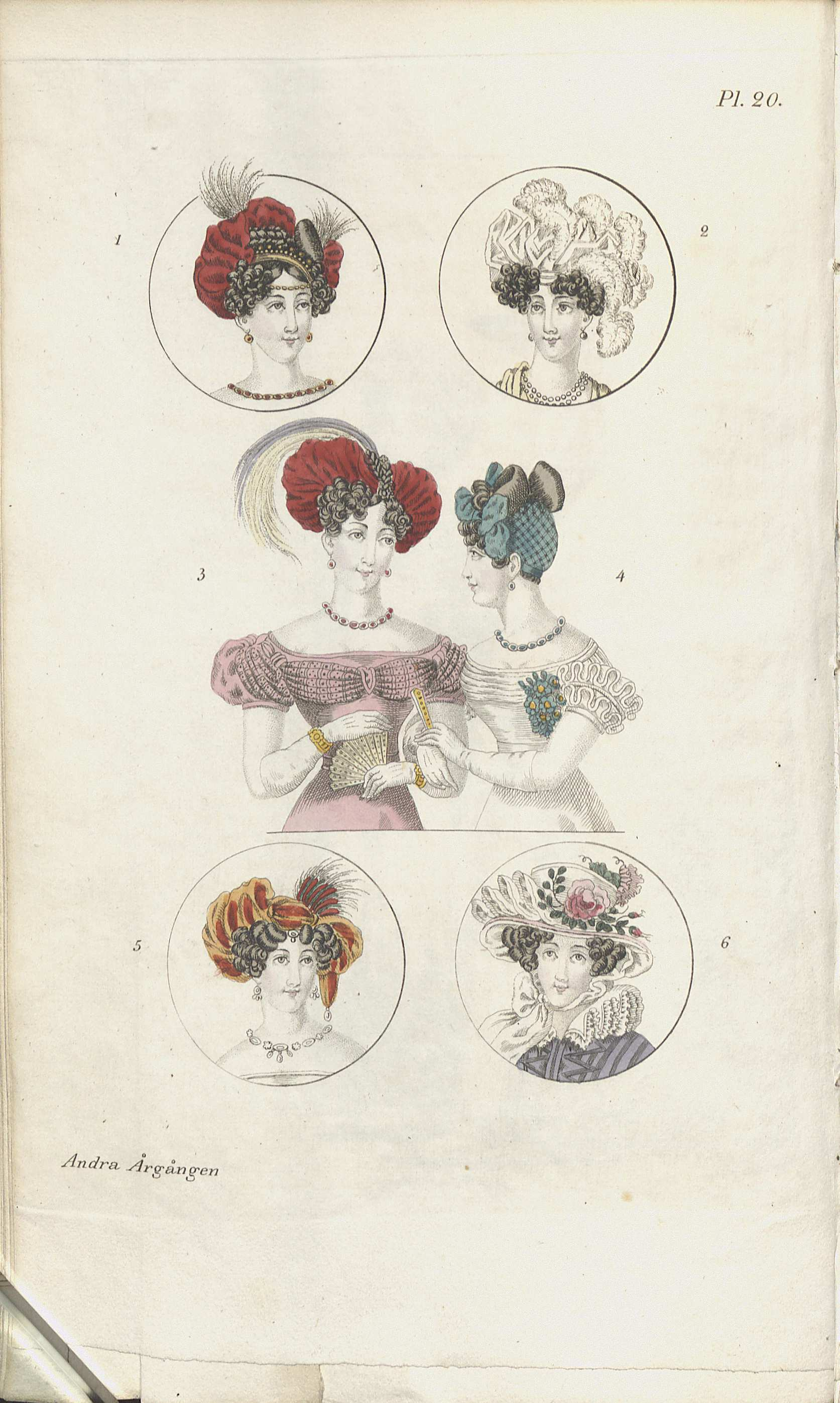
Headgear in 1825

Early in the decade, hair was parted in the center front and styled into tight curls over the temples. As the decade progressed, these curls became more elaborate and expansive. The bun on the back became a looped knot worn high on top of the head. Wide-brimmed hats and hat-like bonnets with masses of feathers and ribbon trims were worn by mid-decade.

Conservative married or older women wore indoor caps of fine linen descended from the earlier mob cap; these had a pleated or gathered caul on the back to cover the hair, and a narrow brim at the front that widened to cover the ears and often tied under the chin. These caps were worn under bonnets for street-wear.

Women also began to wear caps known as a cornette around 1816. These caps were tied under the chin and worn indoors. They also tended to be greatly adorned with plumes, ribbons, flowers, and jewels. Another alternative to the cornette was the turban, also often bejeweled and adorned, which shows the great interest in exotic cultures.

=== Outerwear ===
Shawls remained popular. Cloaks and full-length coats were worn in cold or wet weather.

=== Shoes ===
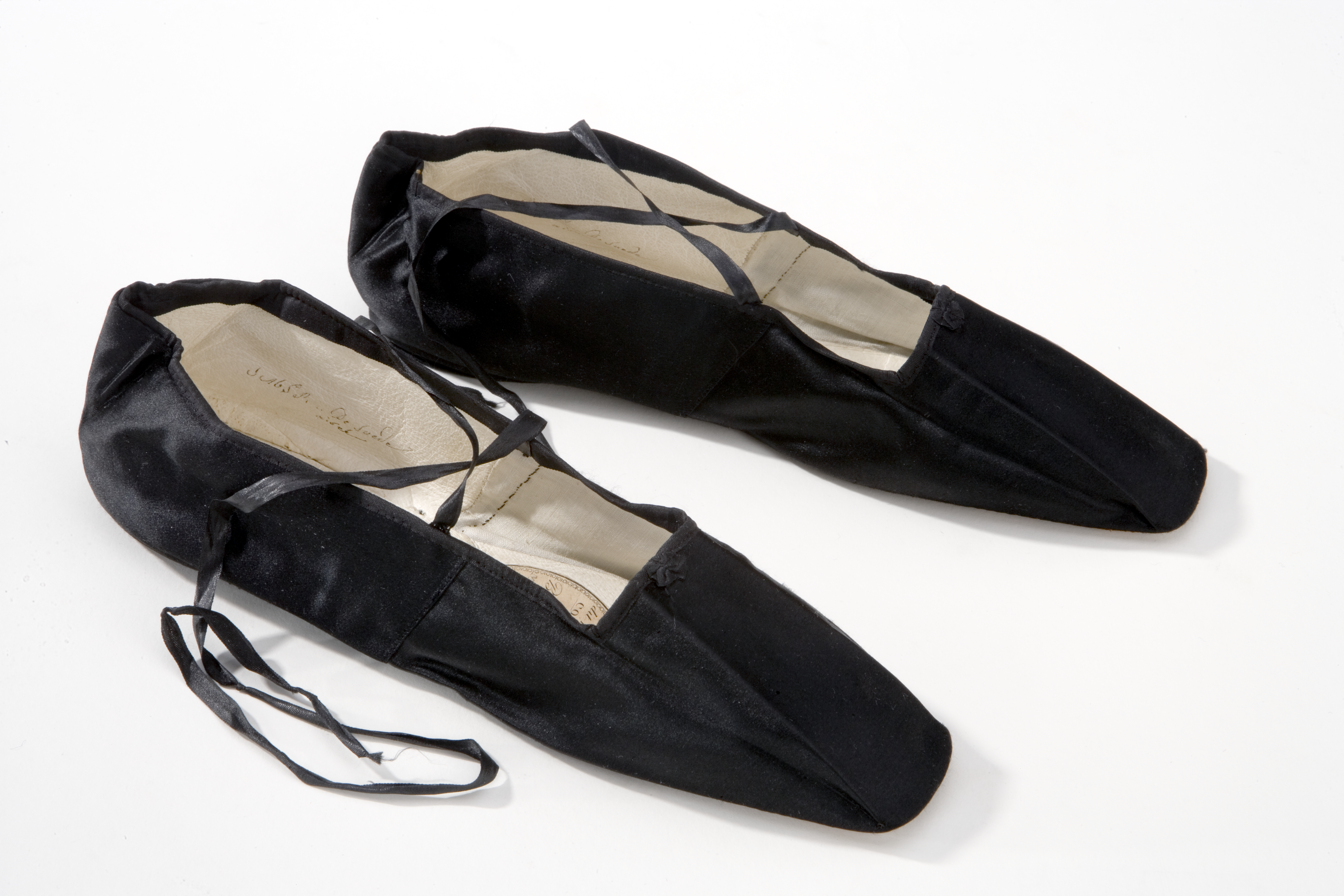
Black silk slippers ca 1825

The fashionable shoe was a flat slipper. In the late 1820s, the first high shoe appeared and became vogue for both men and women. The shoe typically consisted of a three-inch high cloth top that laced on the inner side and a leather vamp that supported a long, narrow, and squared toe.

=== Dresses of 1820 ===
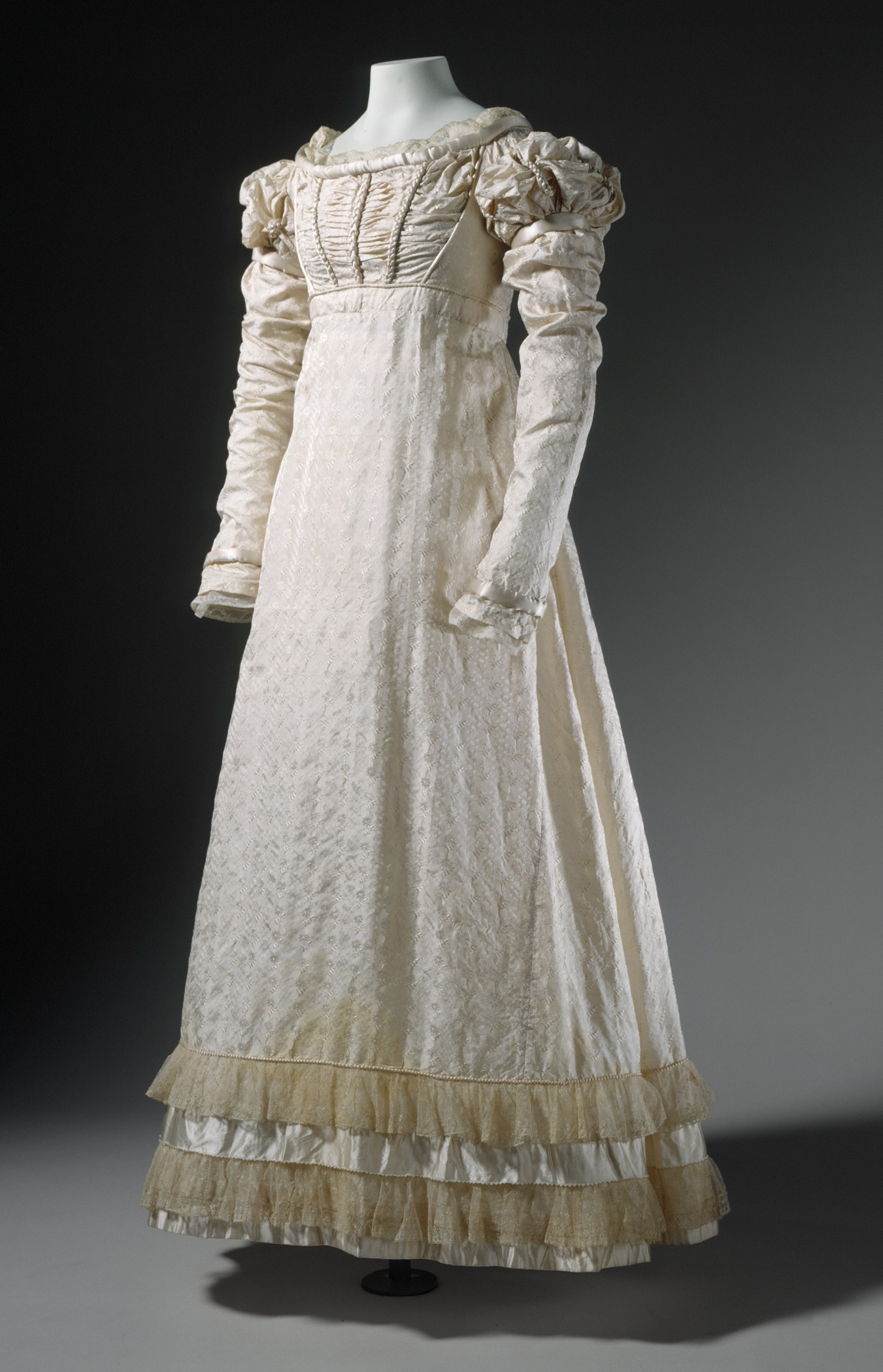
Young women's dress 1820

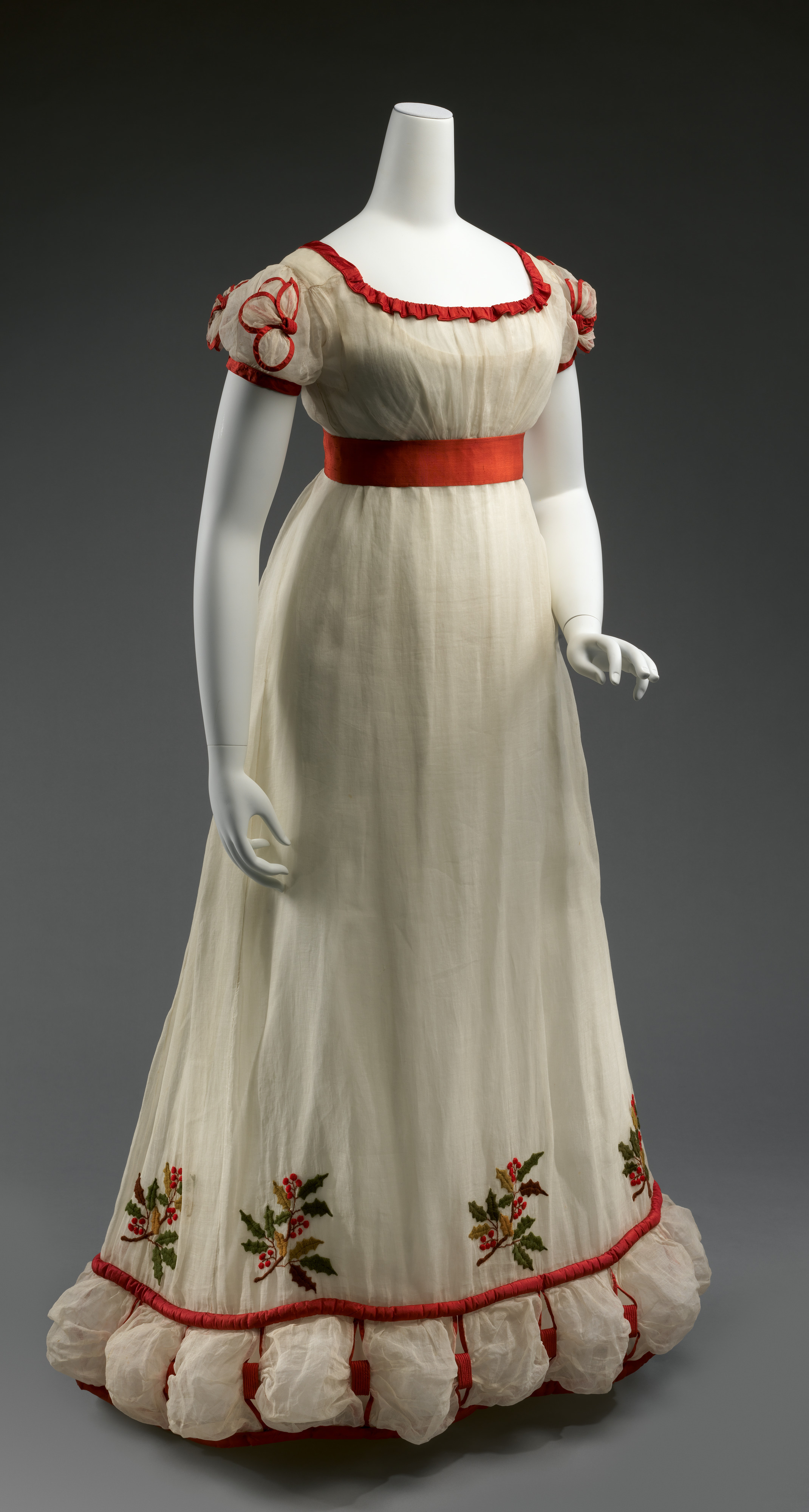
Dinner dress 1820 England

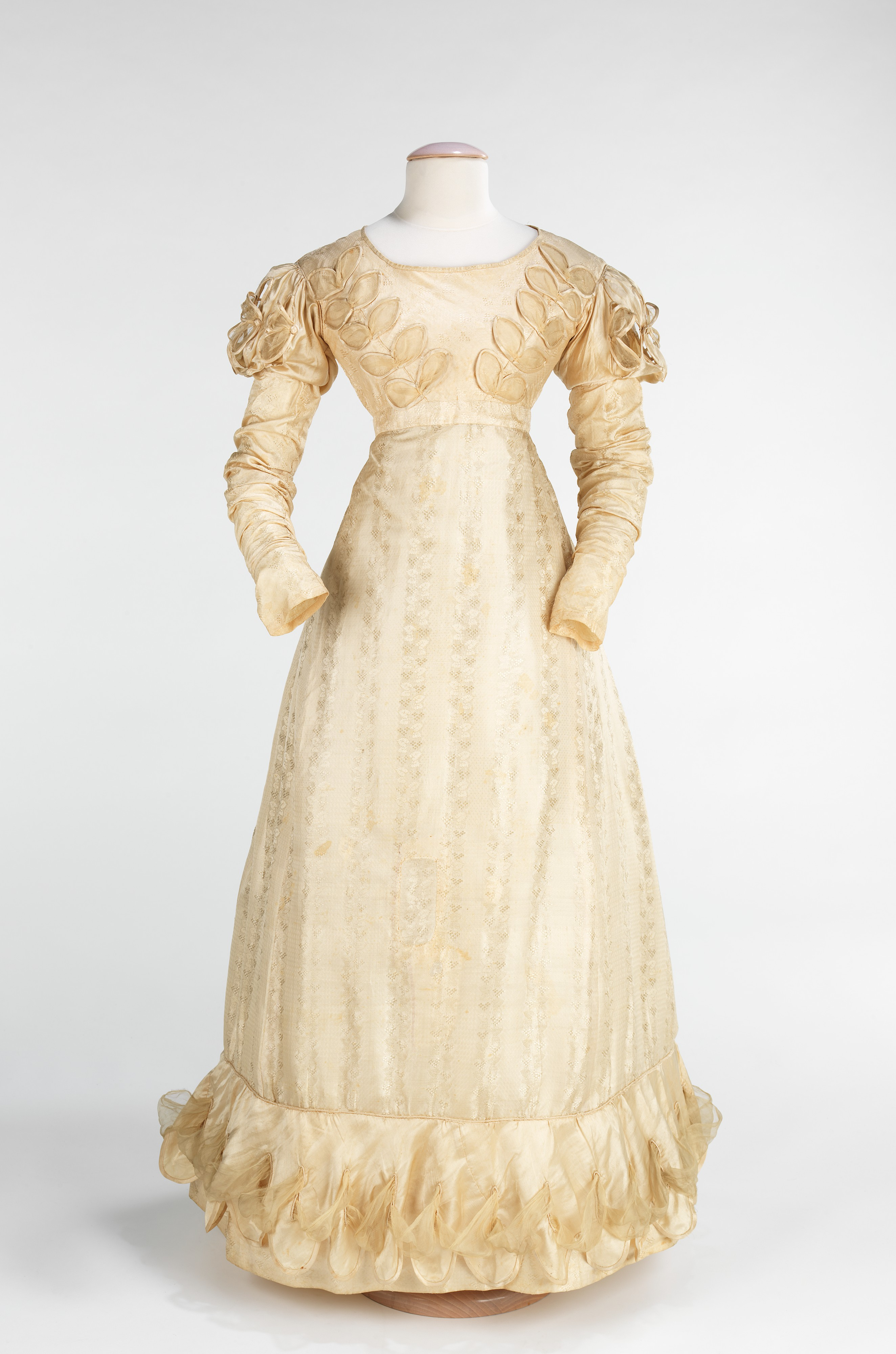
Wedding dress

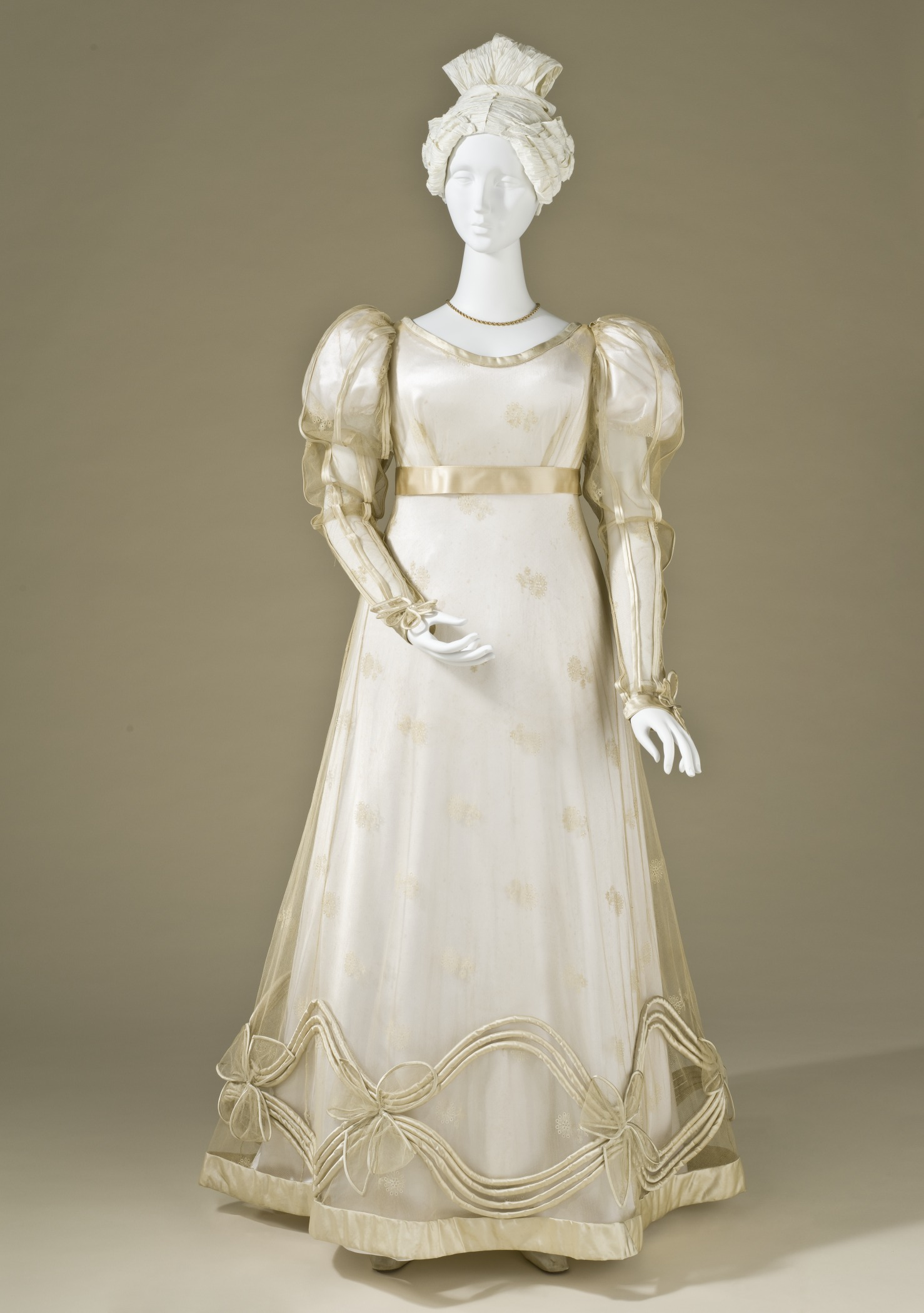
Woman's dress

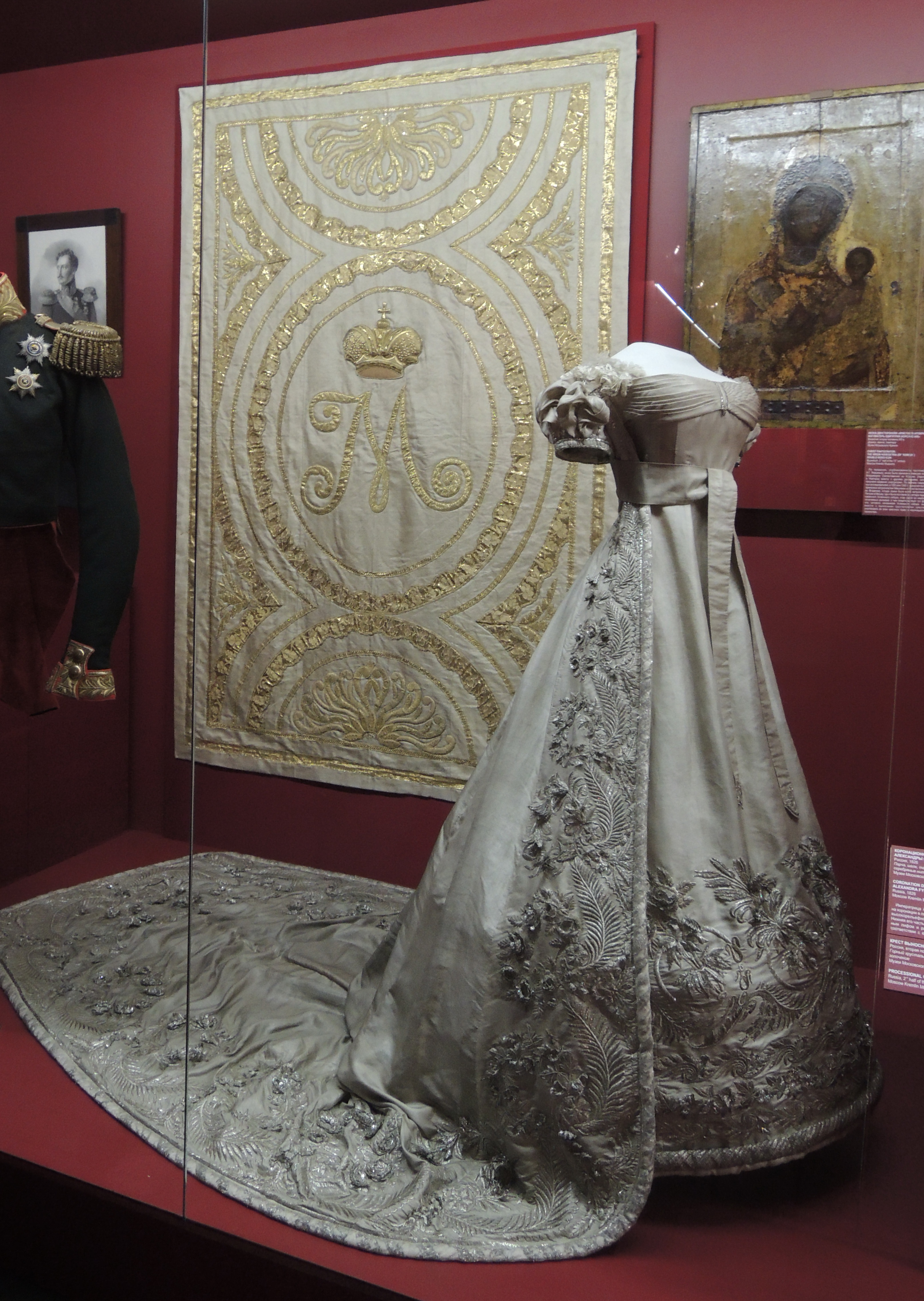
1826 coronation dress

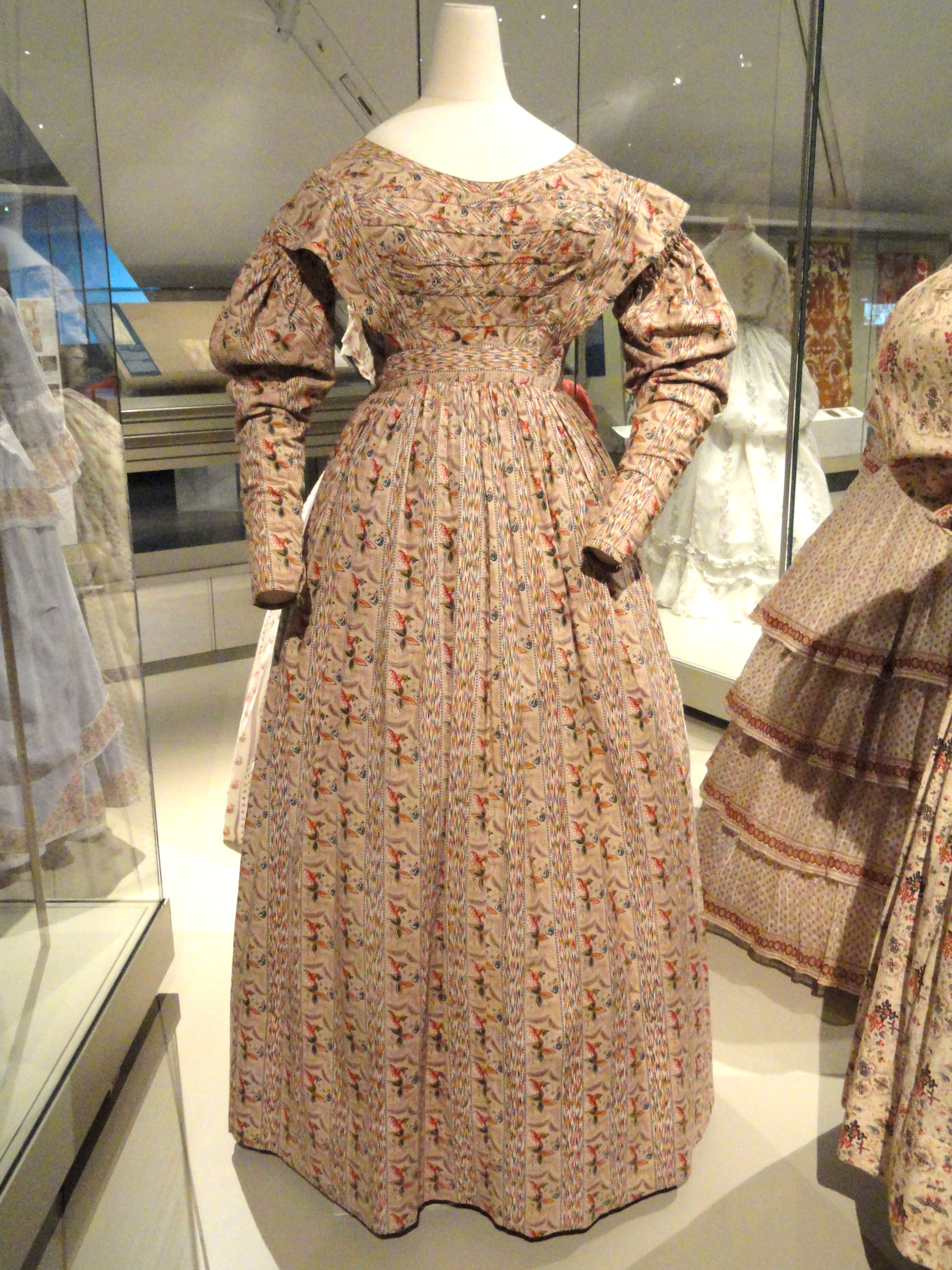
1827 dress

=== Fashion Plates ===
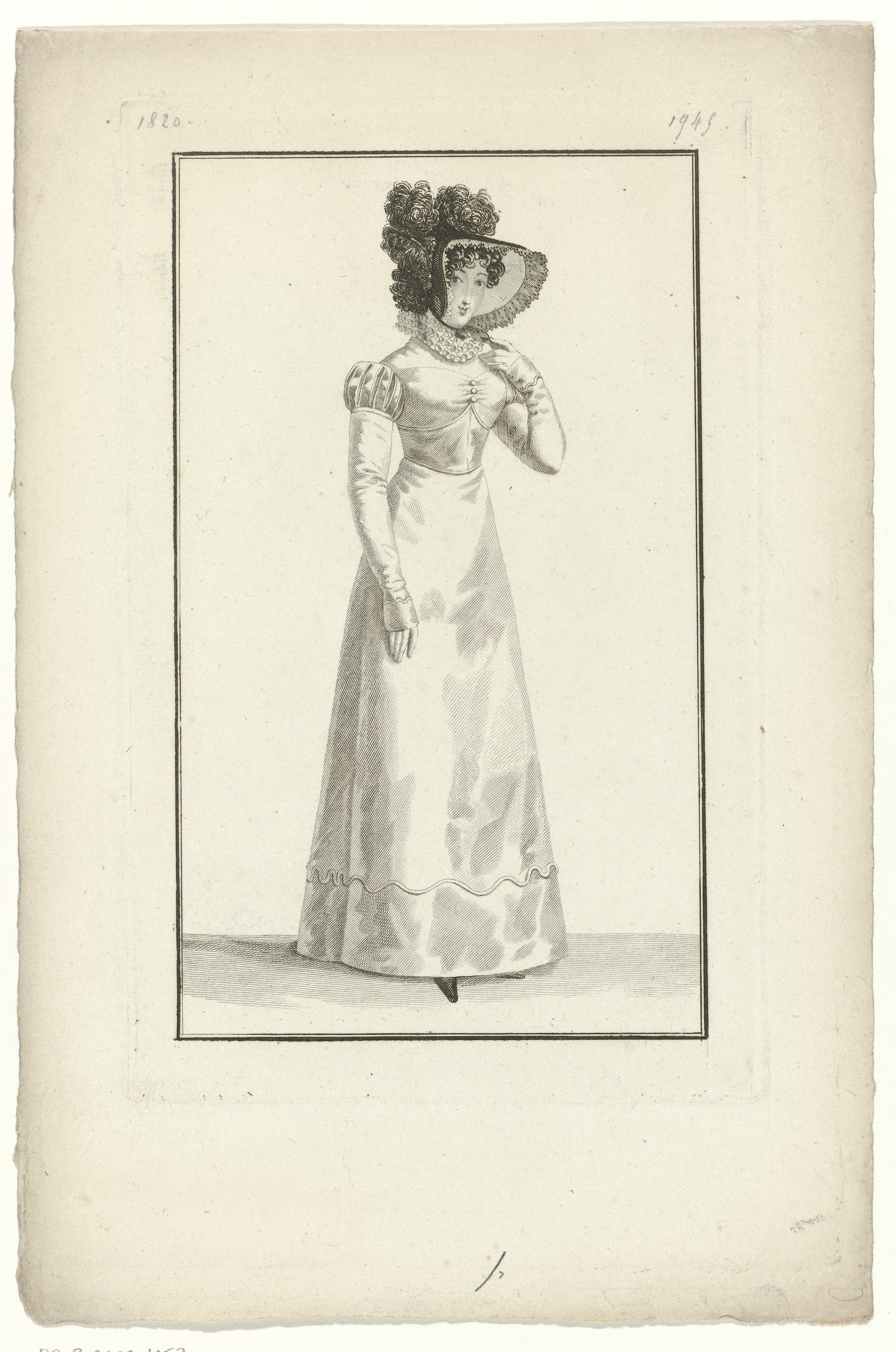

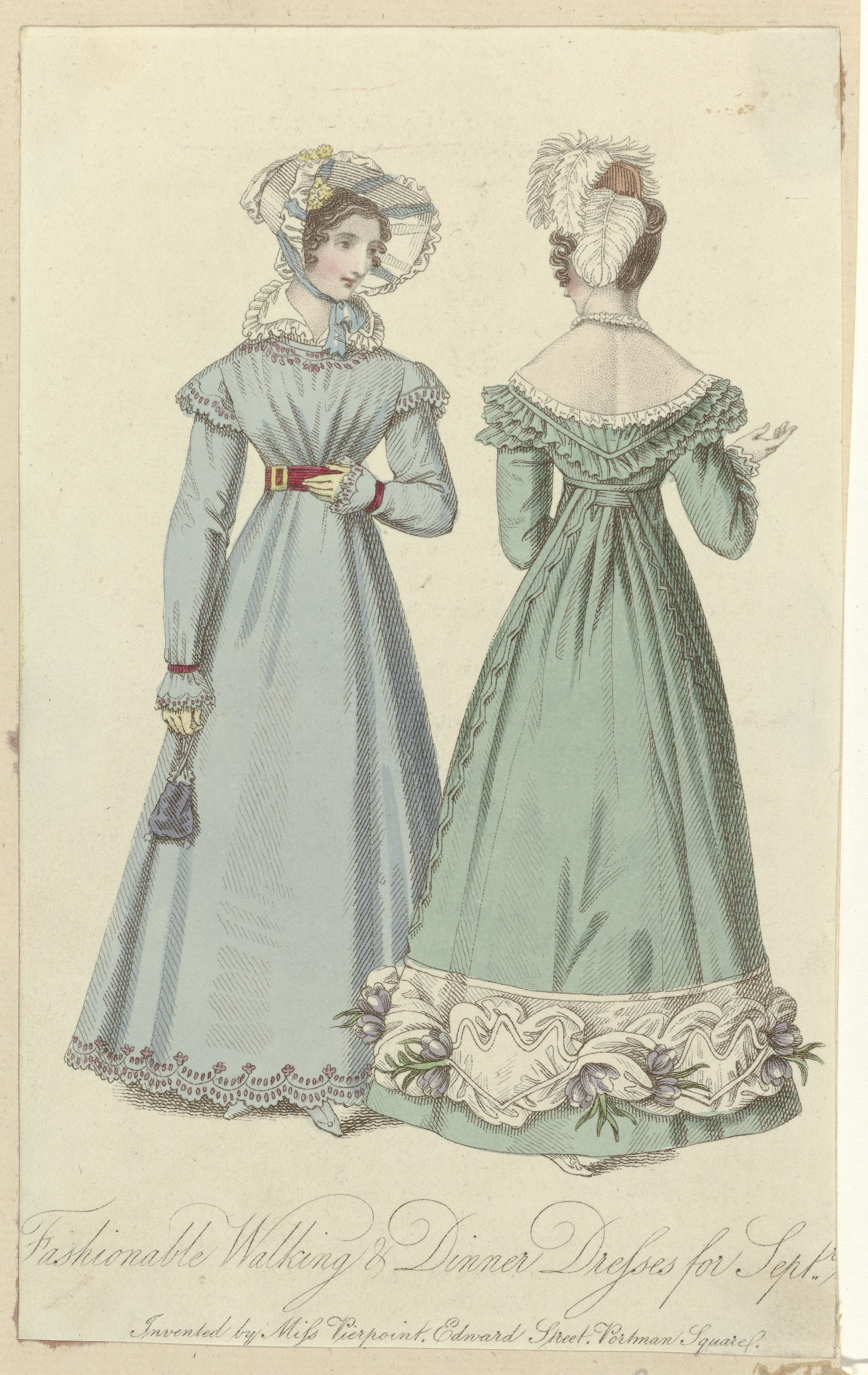

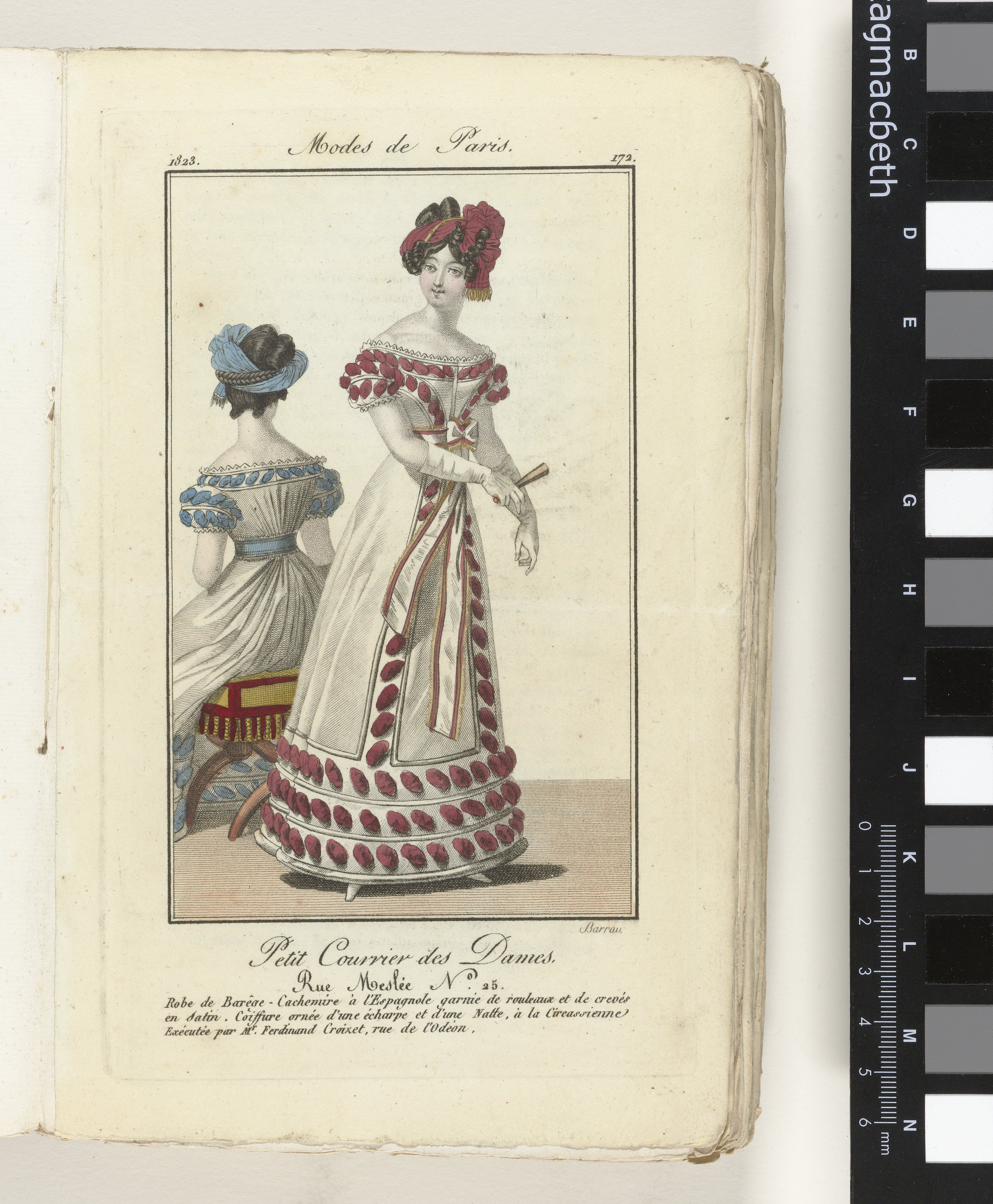

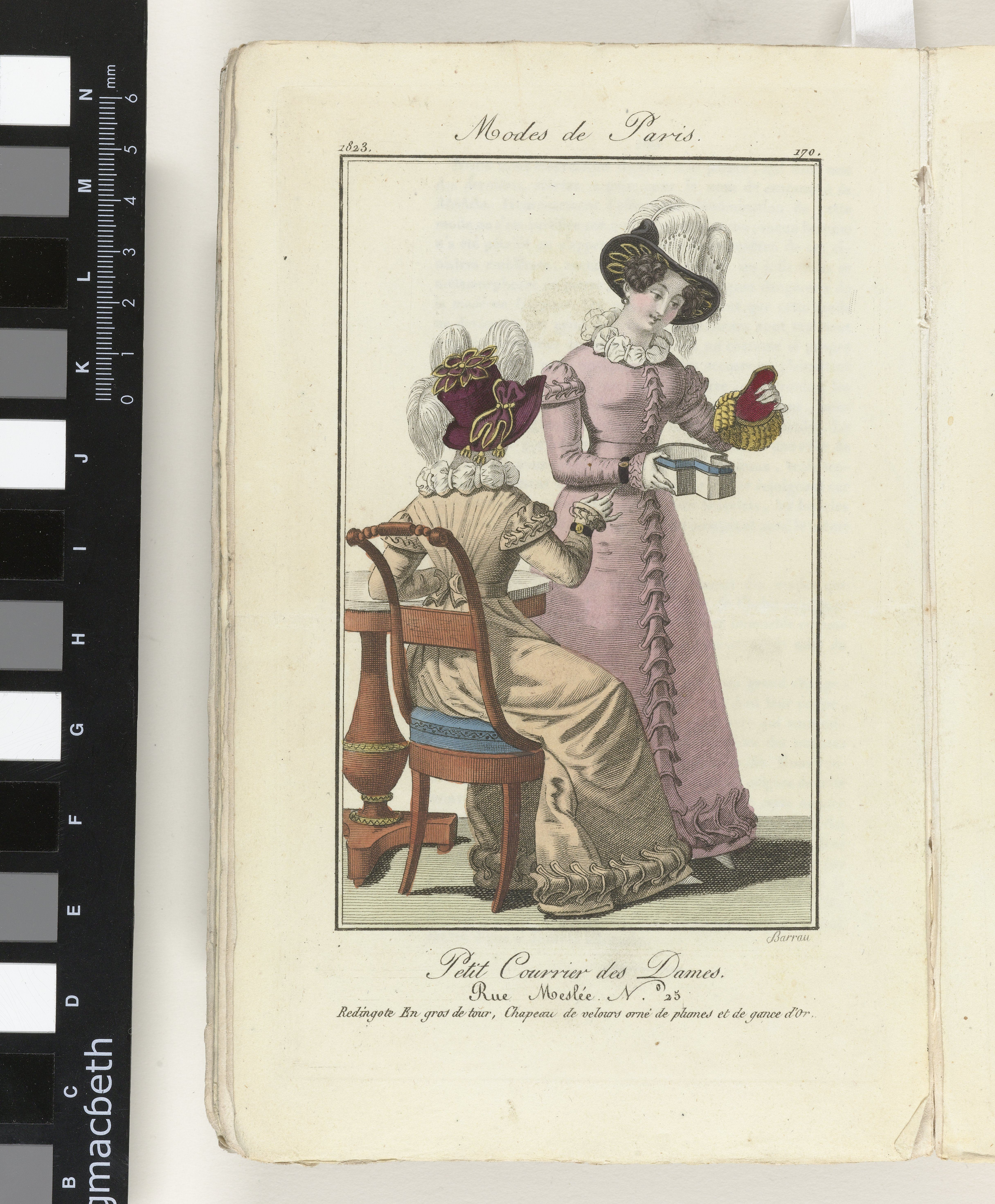

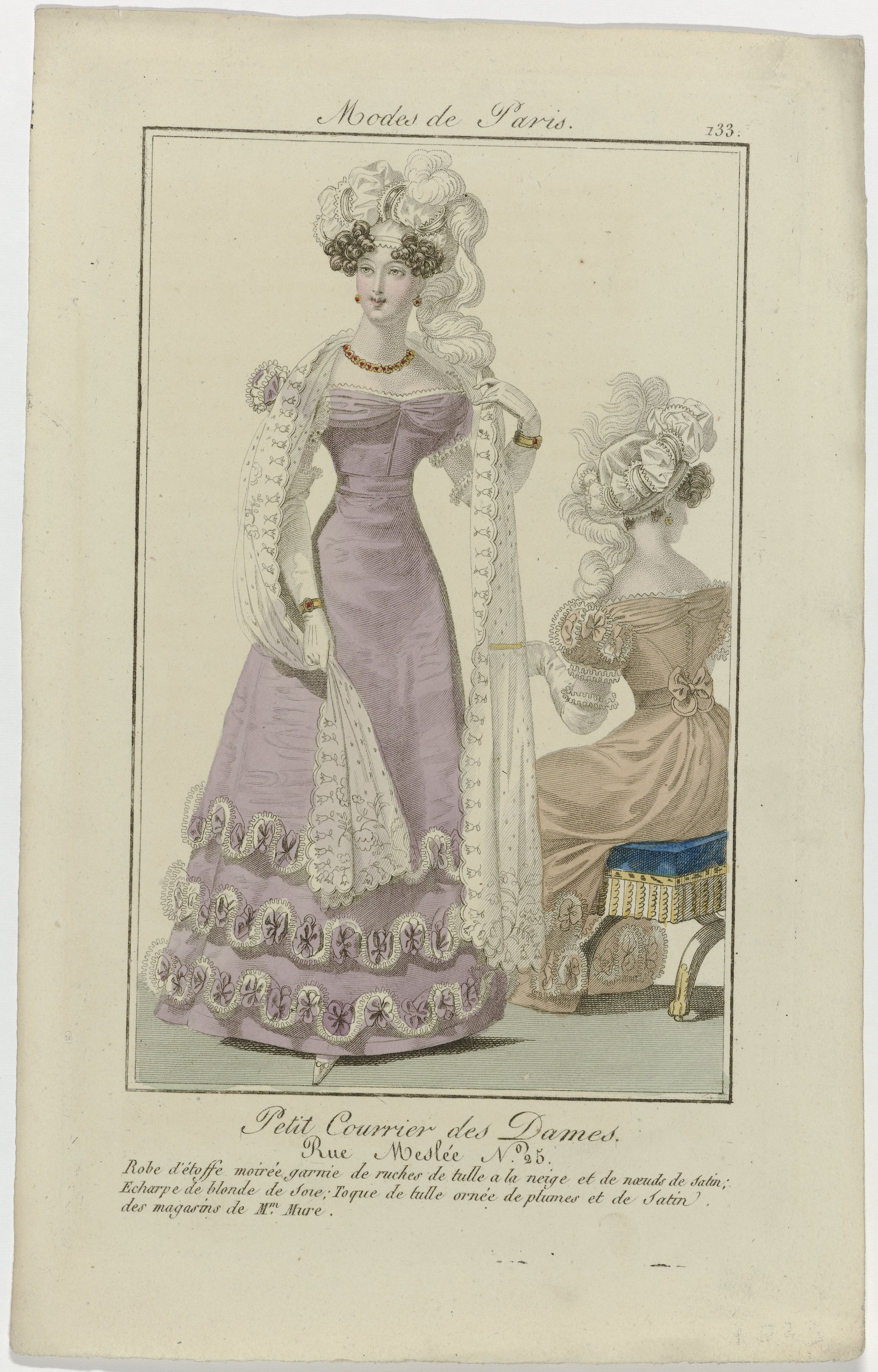

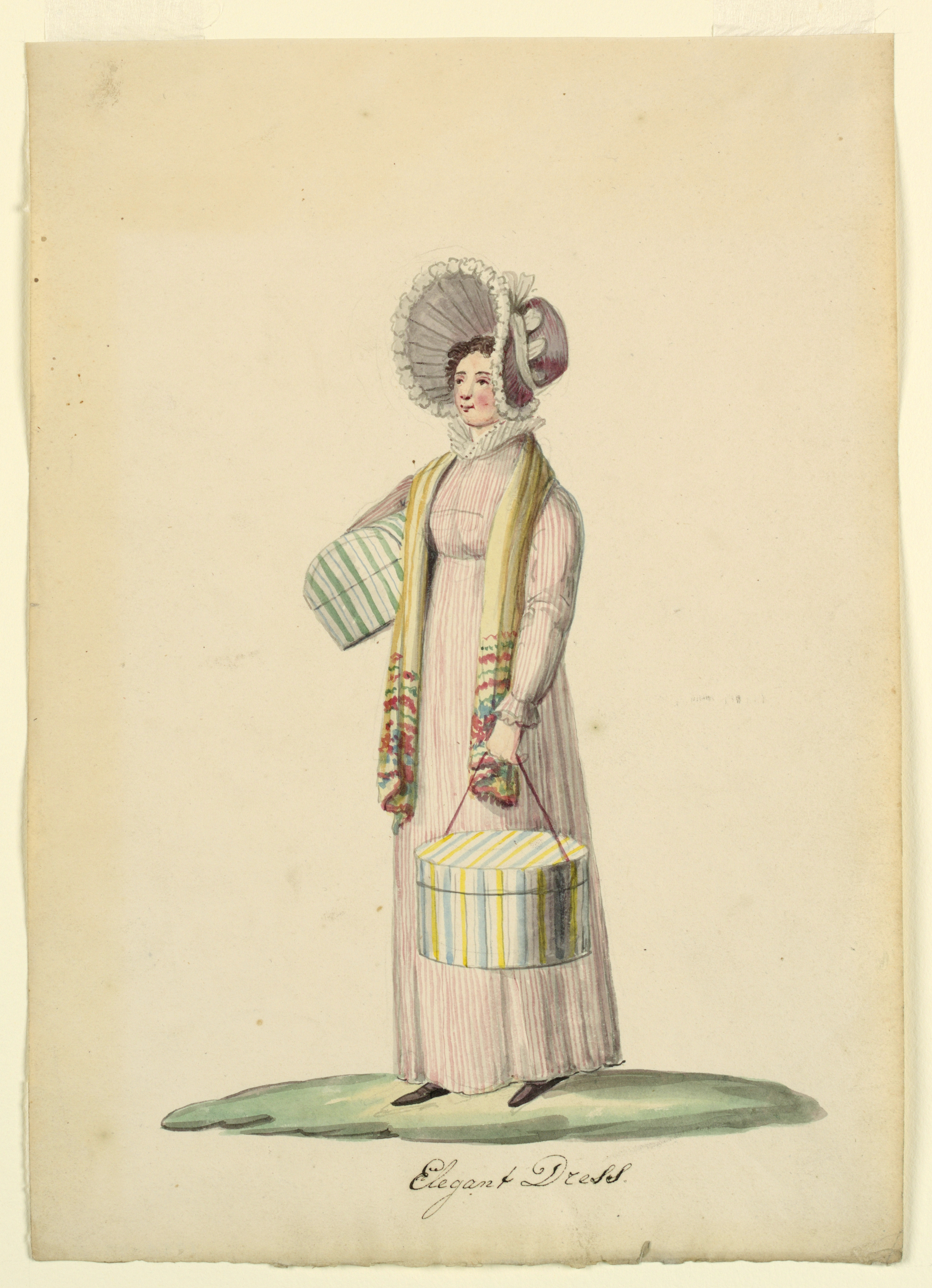

=== Style gallery 1820–1825 ===
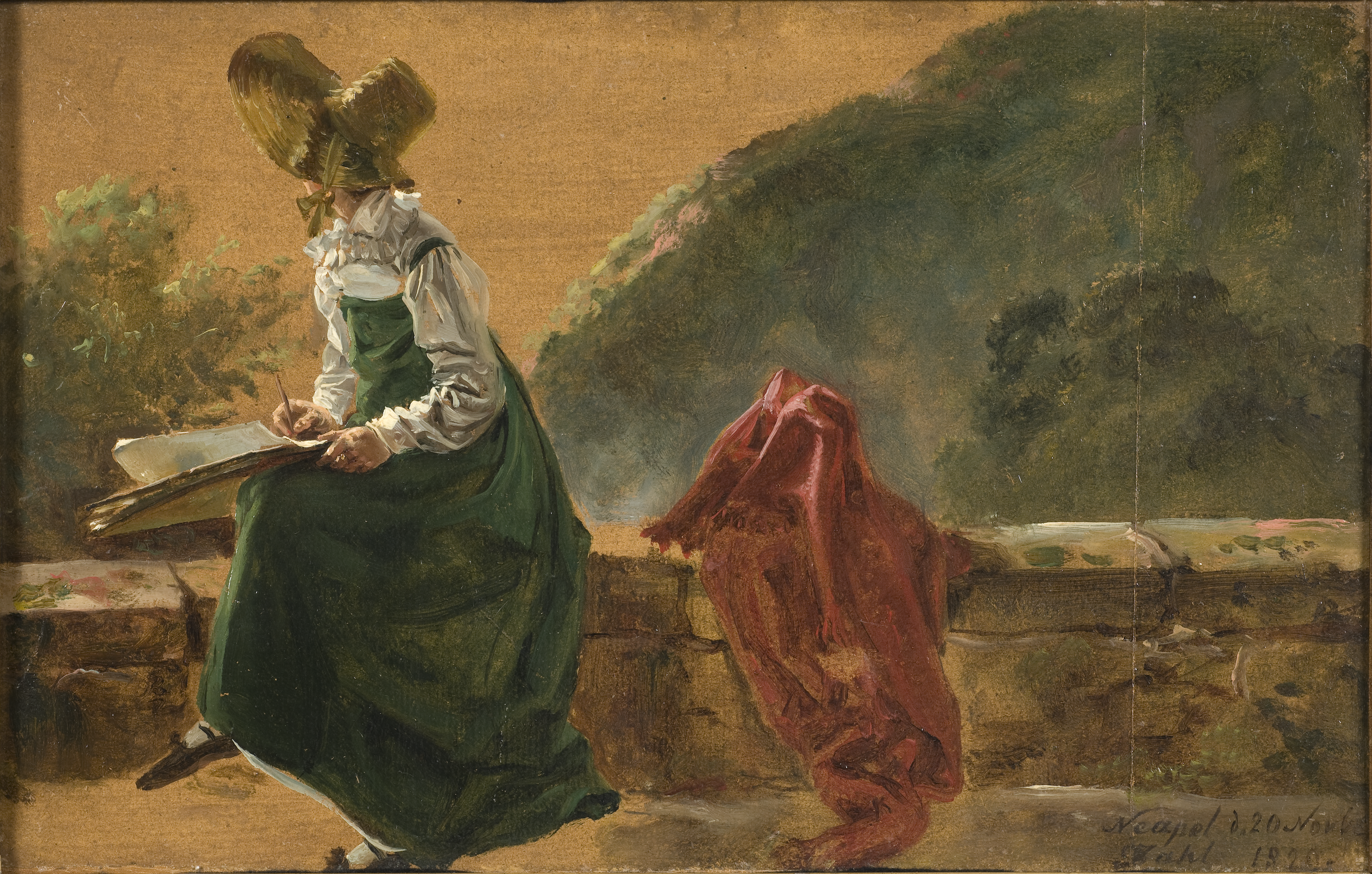
1 – 1820

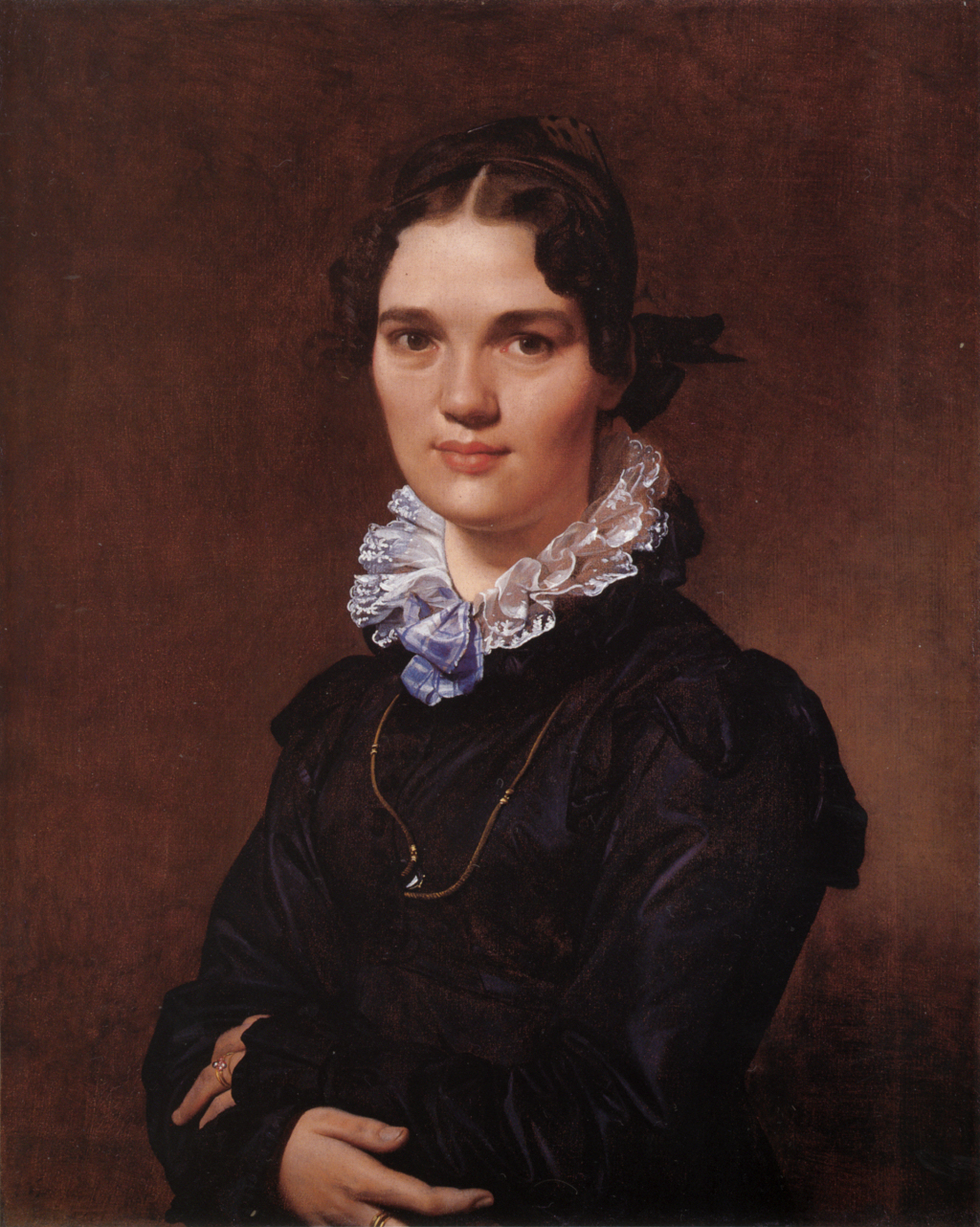
2 – 1821

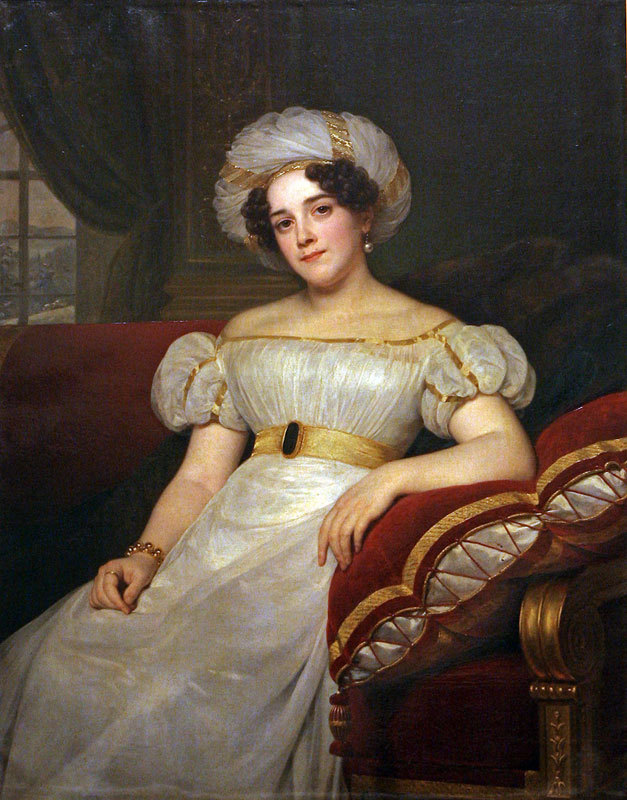
3 – 1821

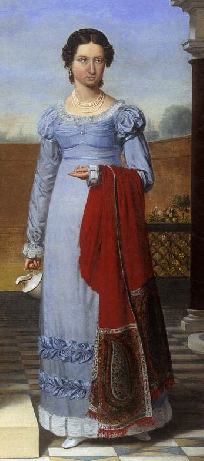
4 – 1822

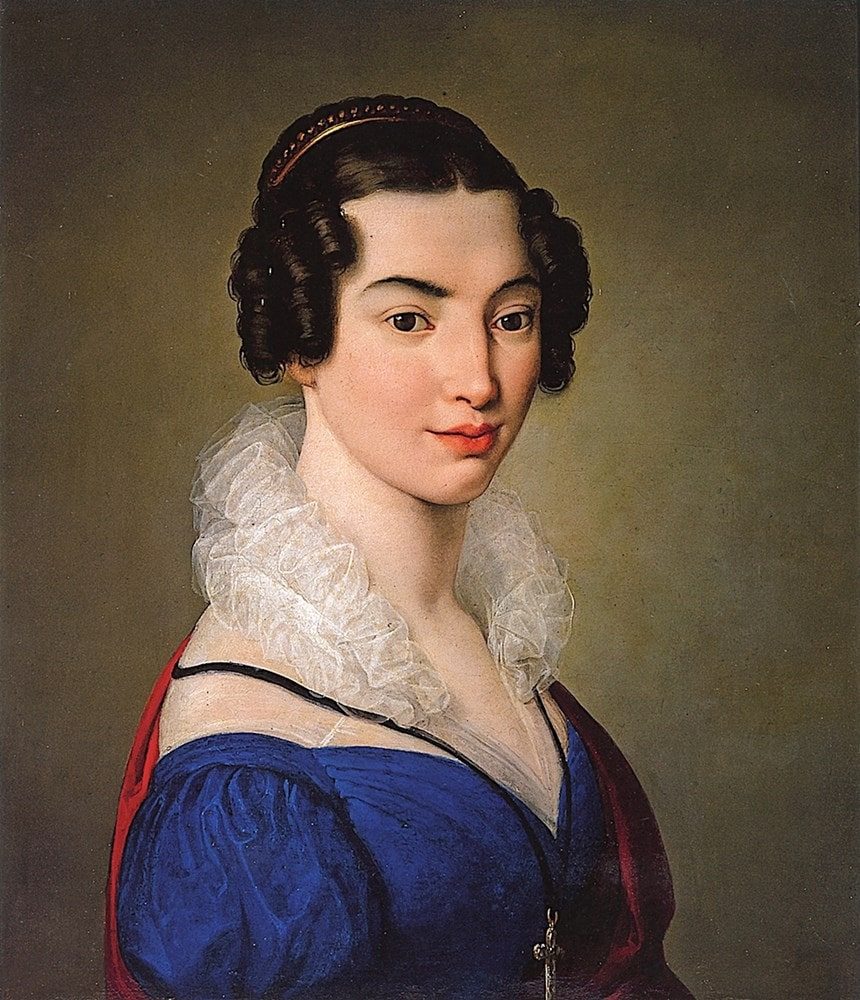
5 – 1823

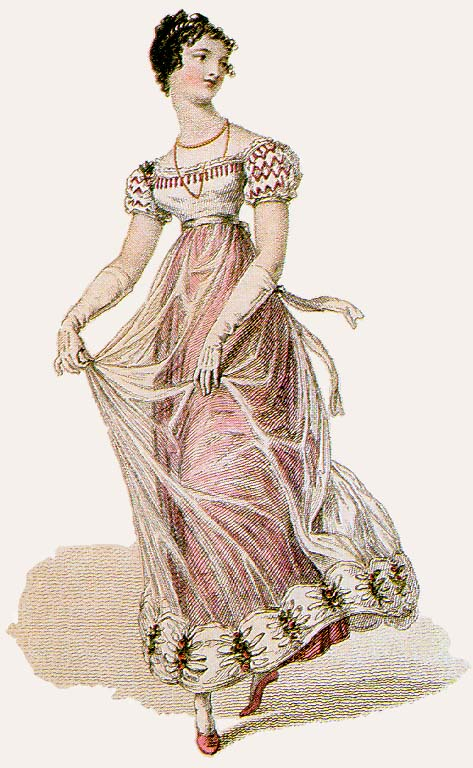
6 – 1823

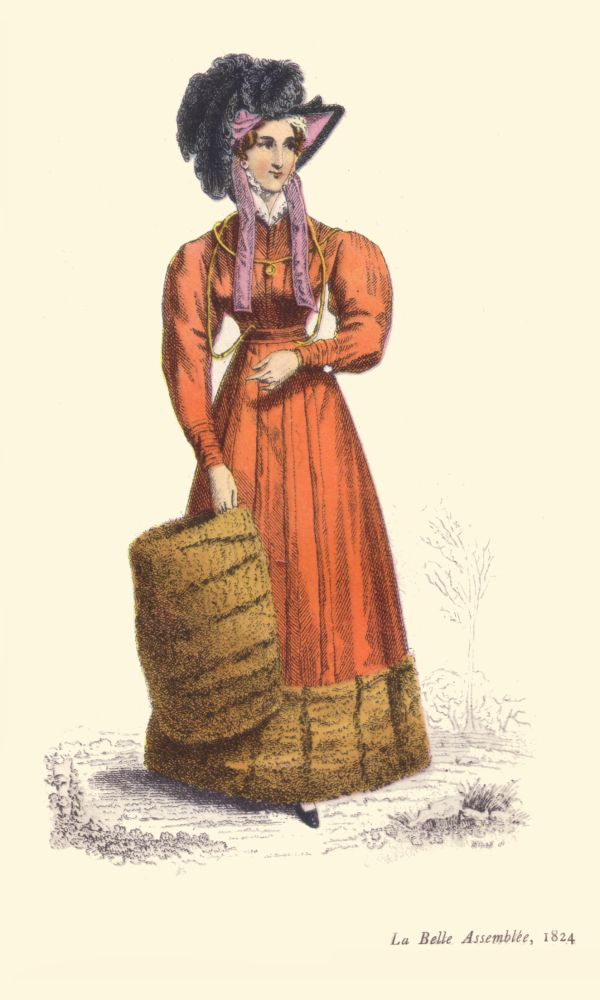
7 – 1824

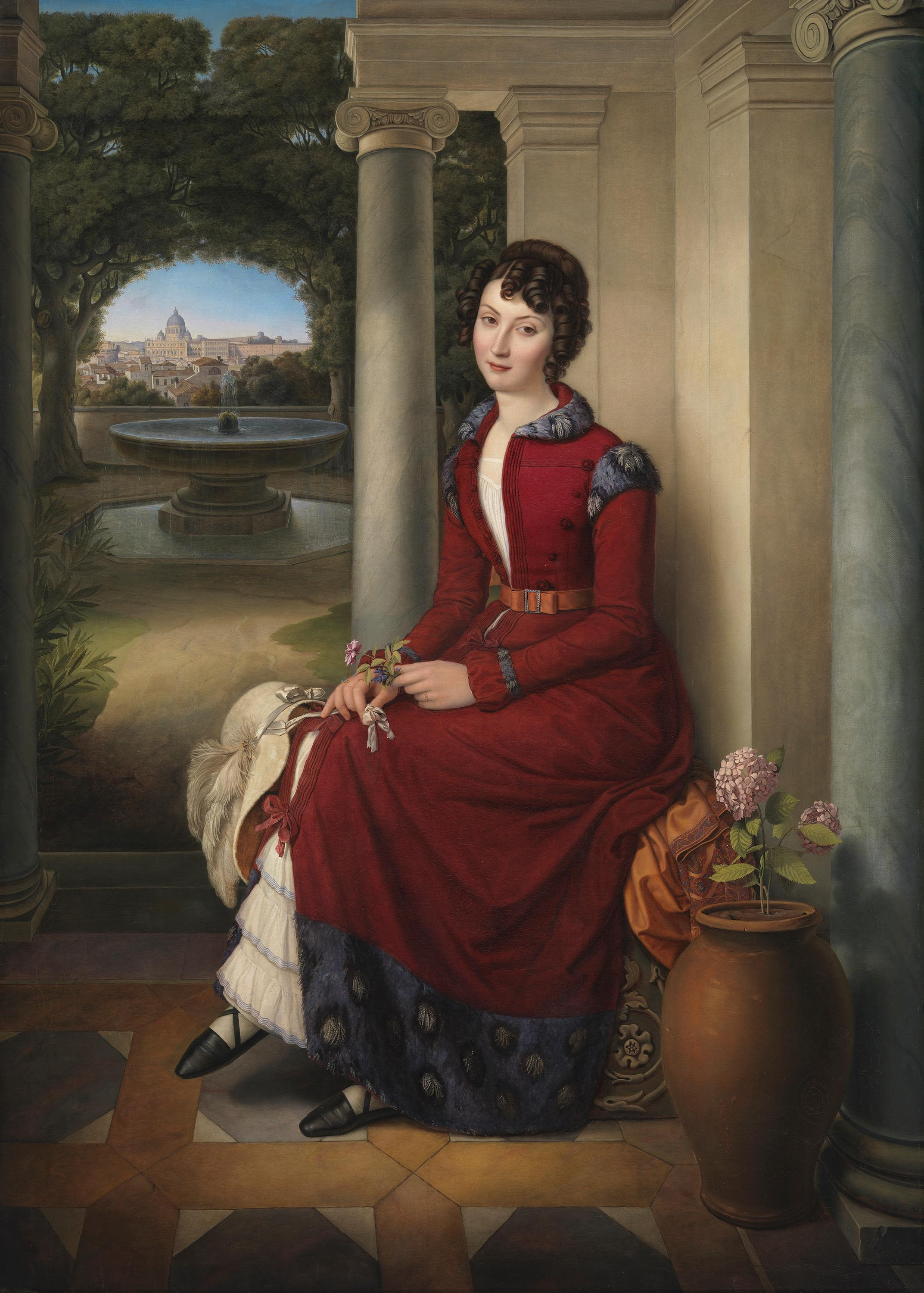
8 – 1824

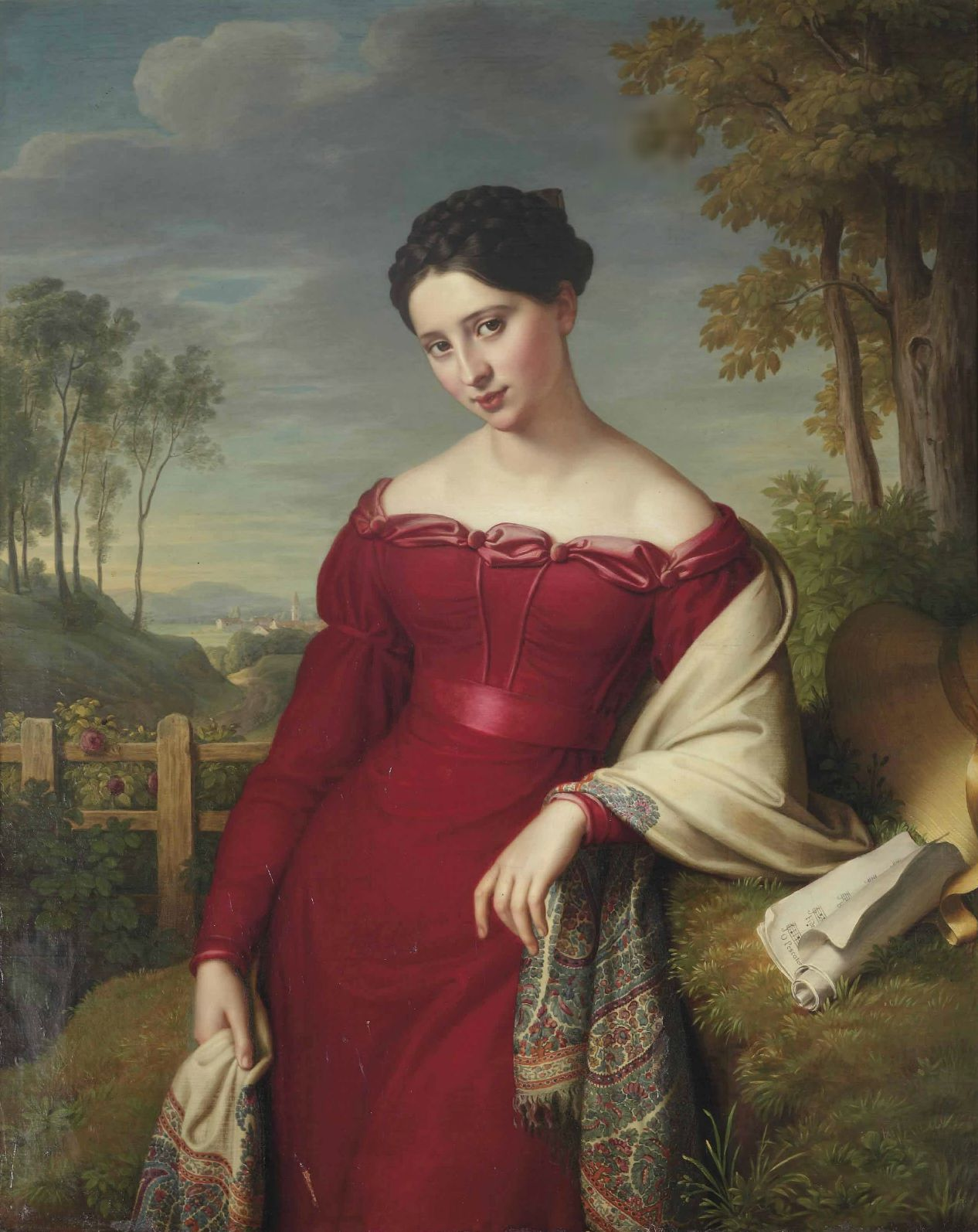
9 - 1824

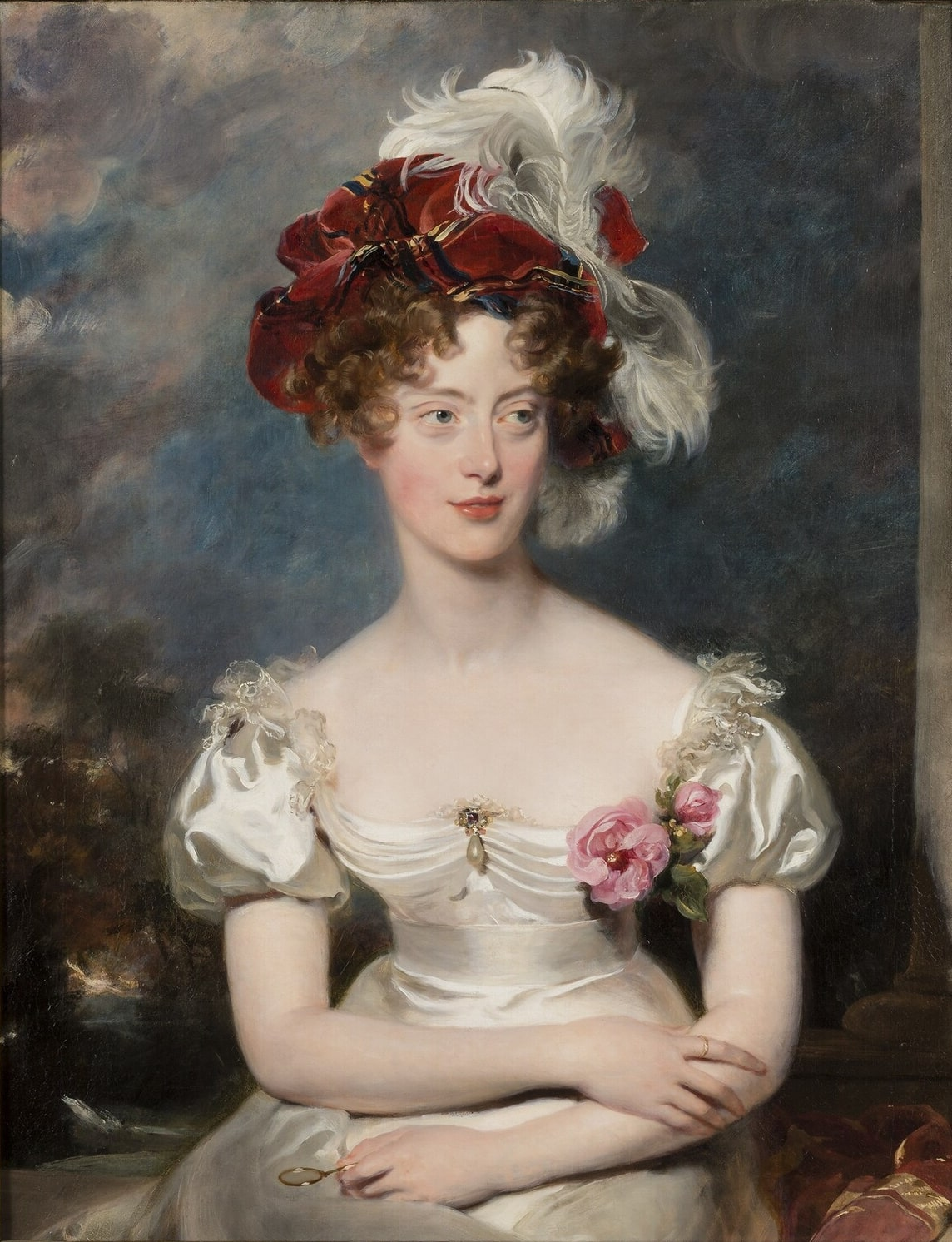
10 – 1825

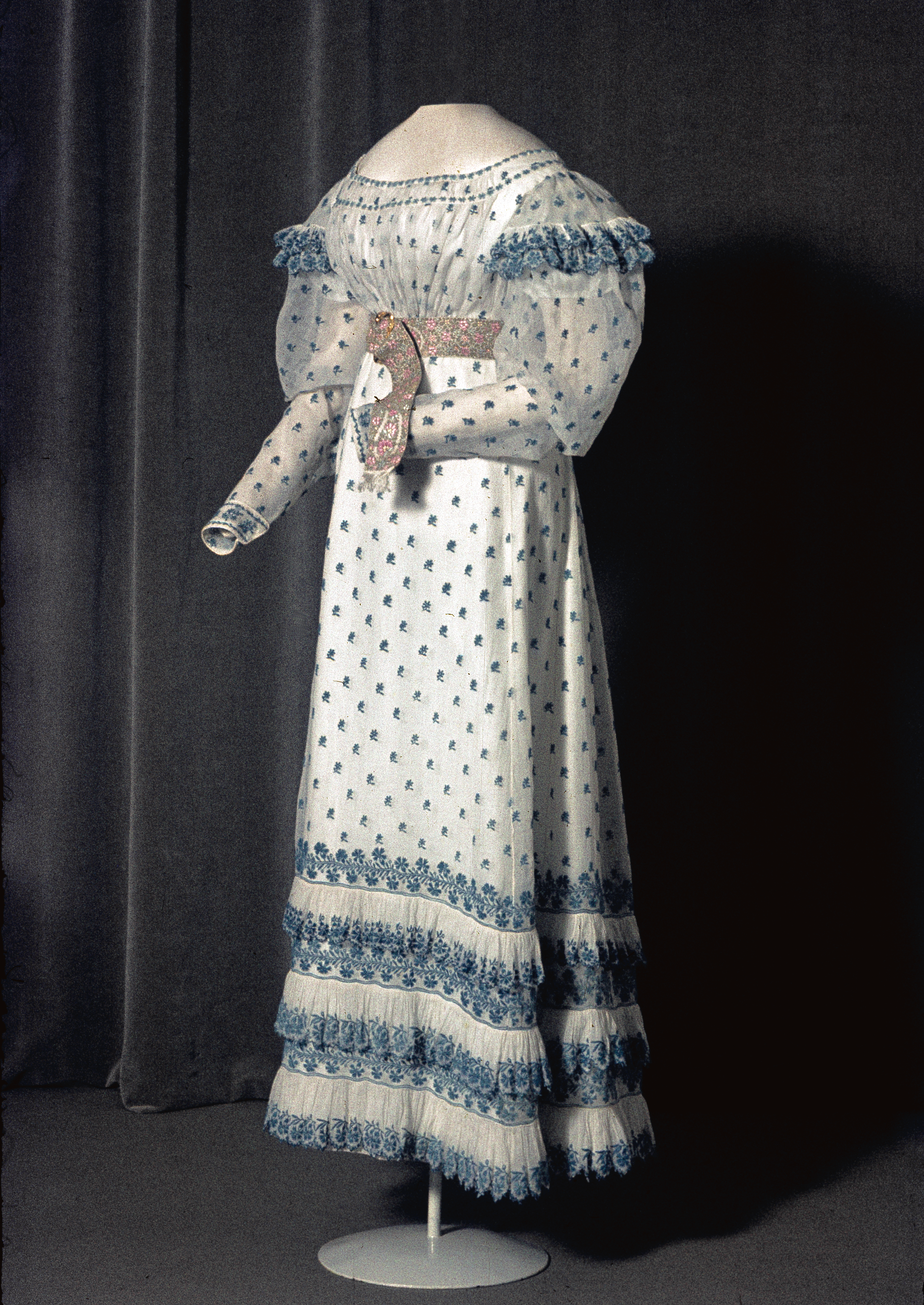
11 – ca 1825

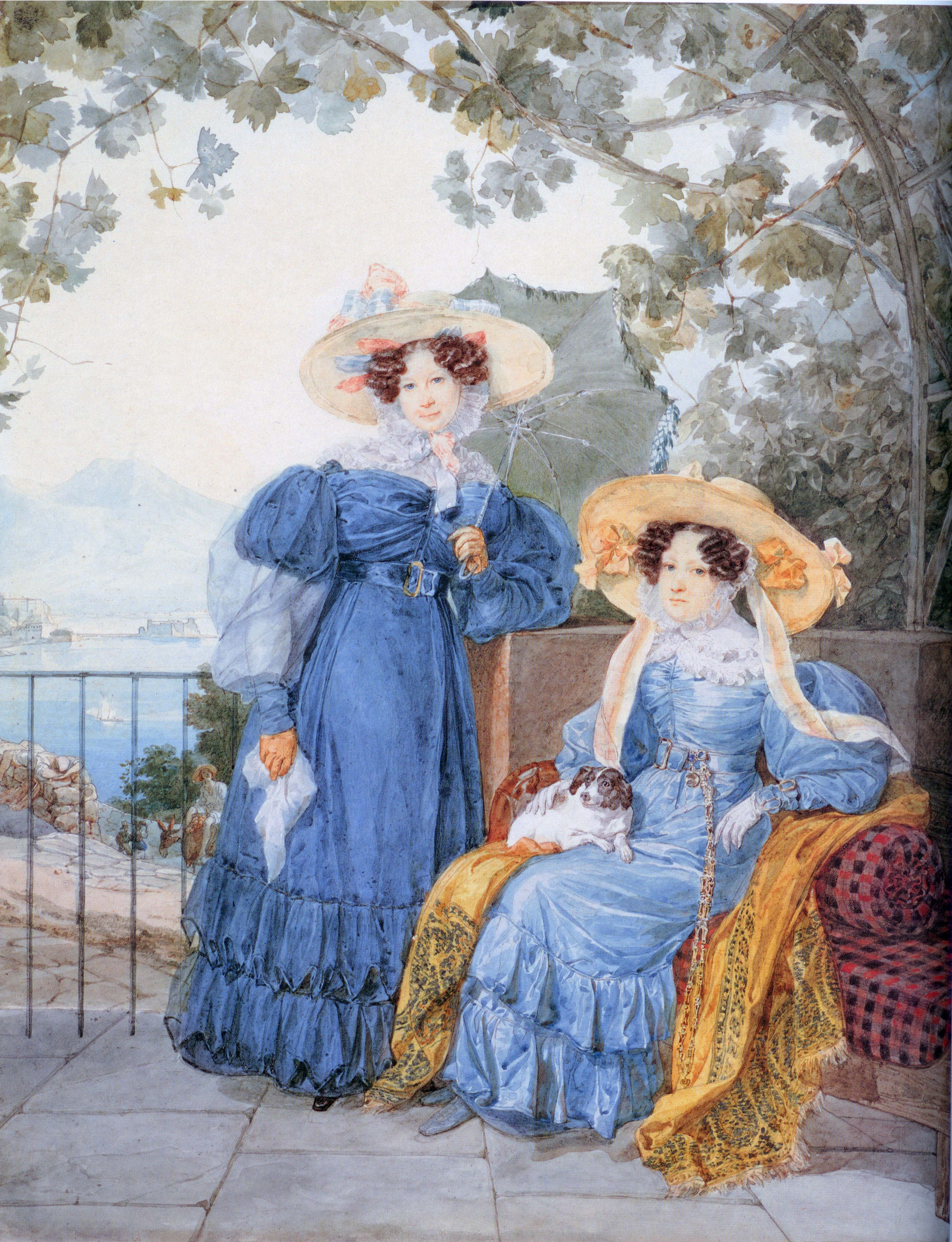
12 – ca 1825
1. Caroline Amalie of Augustenburg wears a green pinafore dress over a white blouse or a chemise with a ruffled collar. A wide brimmed straw hat protects her face from the sun.
2. Mademoiselle Gonin wears a dark dress with small puffed sleeves, with a ruffled collar and a blue plaid ribbon at the neck. Her hair is styled into small curls at her temples.
3. Natalia Stepanovna Golitsyna wears a white silk dress with puffed sleeves, and a matching turban.
4. Collette Versavel's blue dress of 1822 is slightly cone-shaped, and is trimmed with frills around the hem. She carries a deep red shawl with a paisley patterned border.
5. Antonietta Vitali Sola wears an arrangement of tight, vertical curls at her temples. Her sheer chemise or chemisette has a double ruffled collar, 1823.
6. Gown of 1823 has a sheer overskirt.
7. Fashion plate of a "carriage" or travelling dress of 1824 has fur trim and a matching muff. Note lower waist, fuller sleeves, and wider skirt.
8. Marchesa Marianna Florenzi wears a fur-trimmed dress with a belt over a white ruffled undergown and carries a feather-trimmed bonnet, 1824
9. This young lady wears a red gown with a satin waistband, accessorized with a paisley shawl, 1824.
10. The Duchess de Berry's fashion-forward gown of 1825 shows the wide waistband that was gradually lowering waistlines. Her fitted bodice and prominent headdress would be important styles for the next several years.
11. Day dress made of cotton, belonging to Josephine of Leuchtenberg
12. Day dresses

=== Style gallery 1826–1829 ===
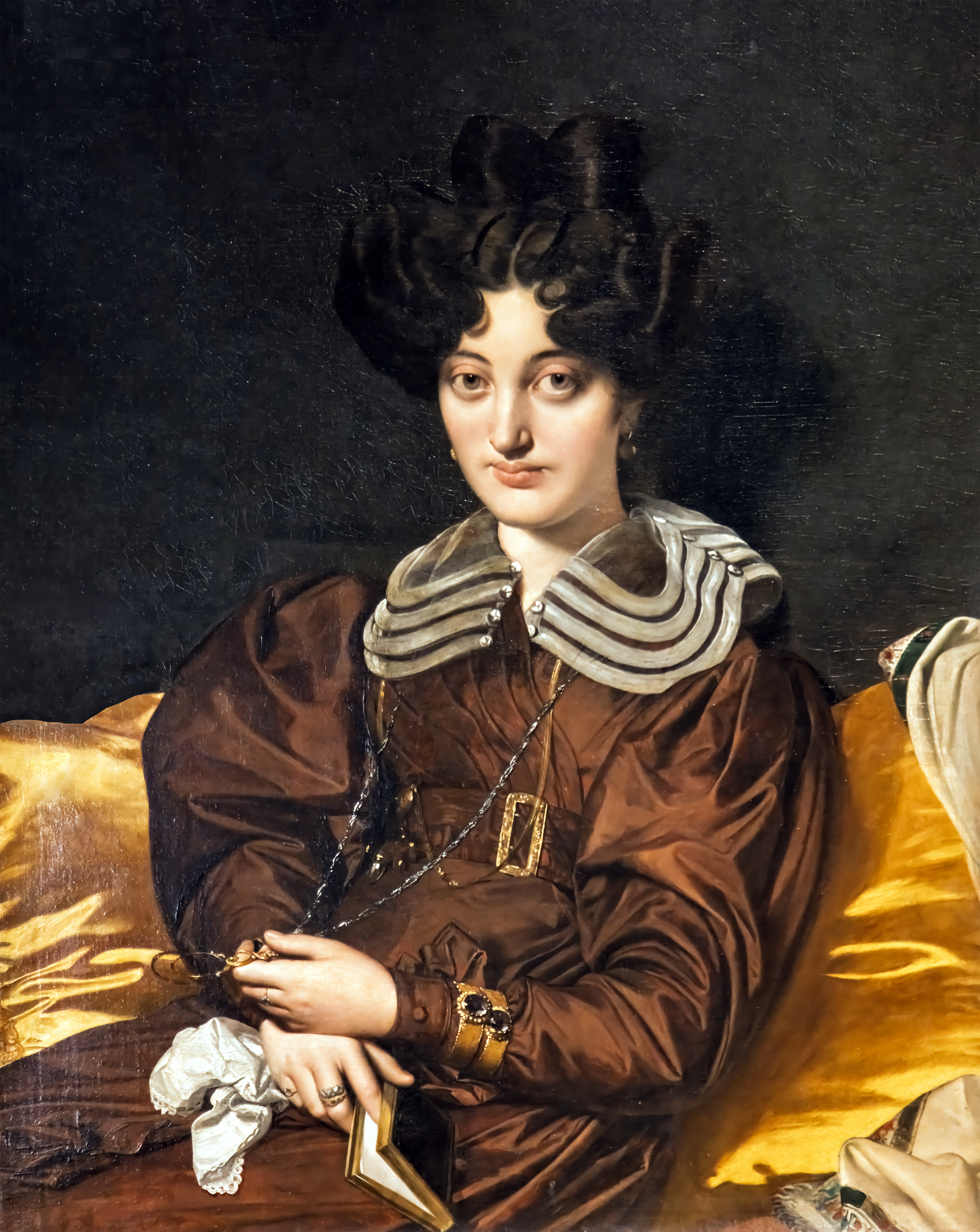
1 – 1826

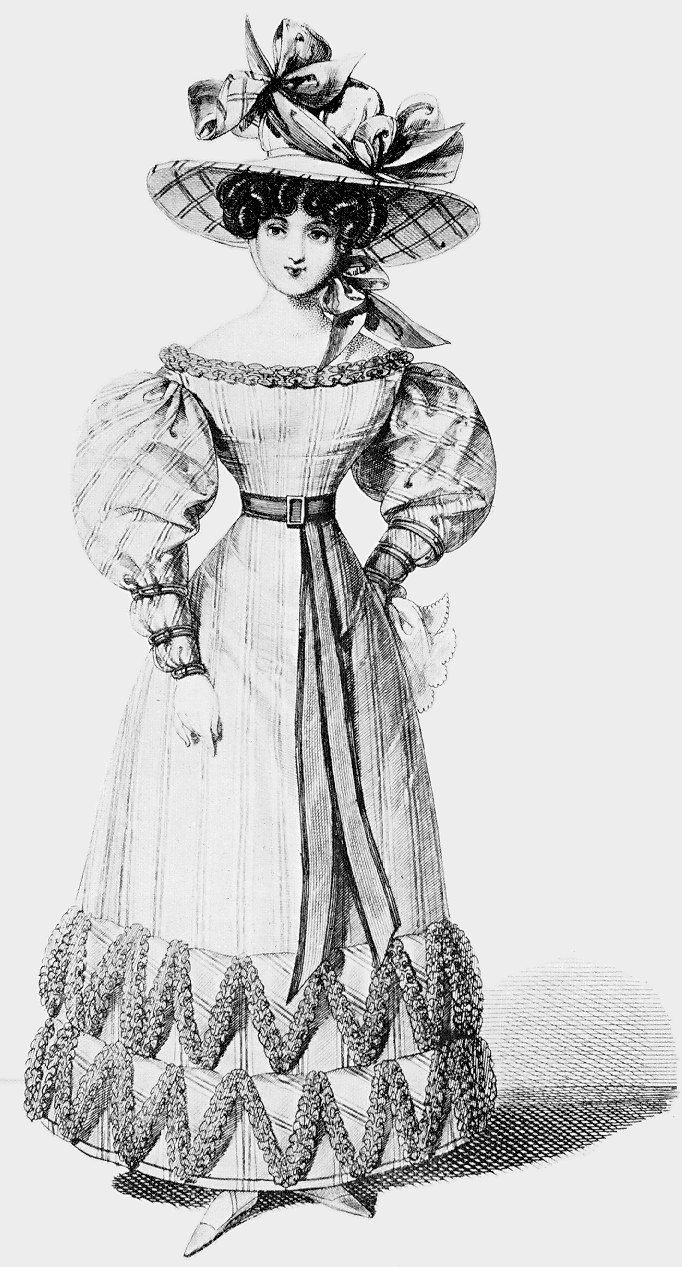
2 – 1826

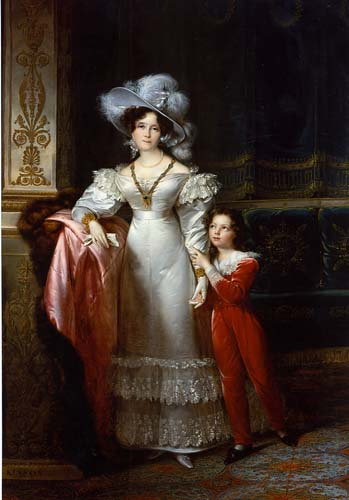
3 – 1825–1830

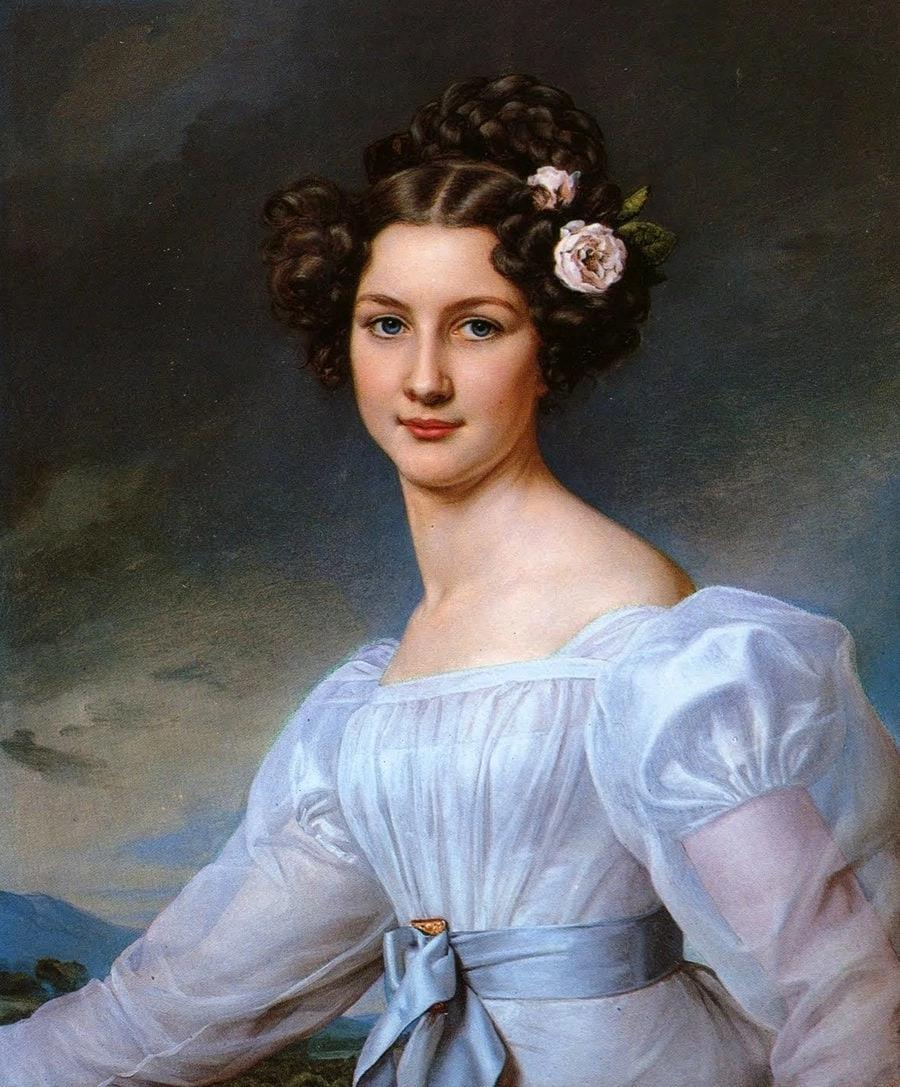
4 – 1827

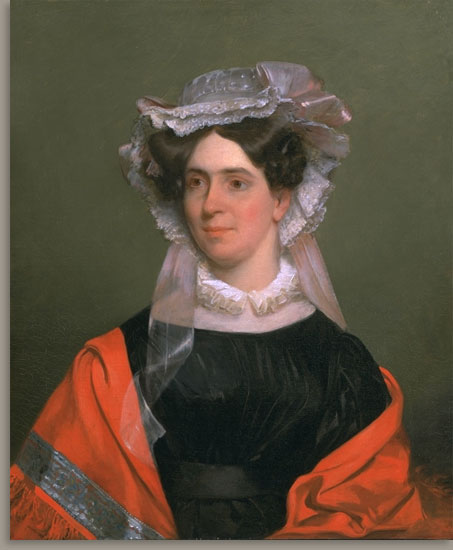
5 – c. 1827

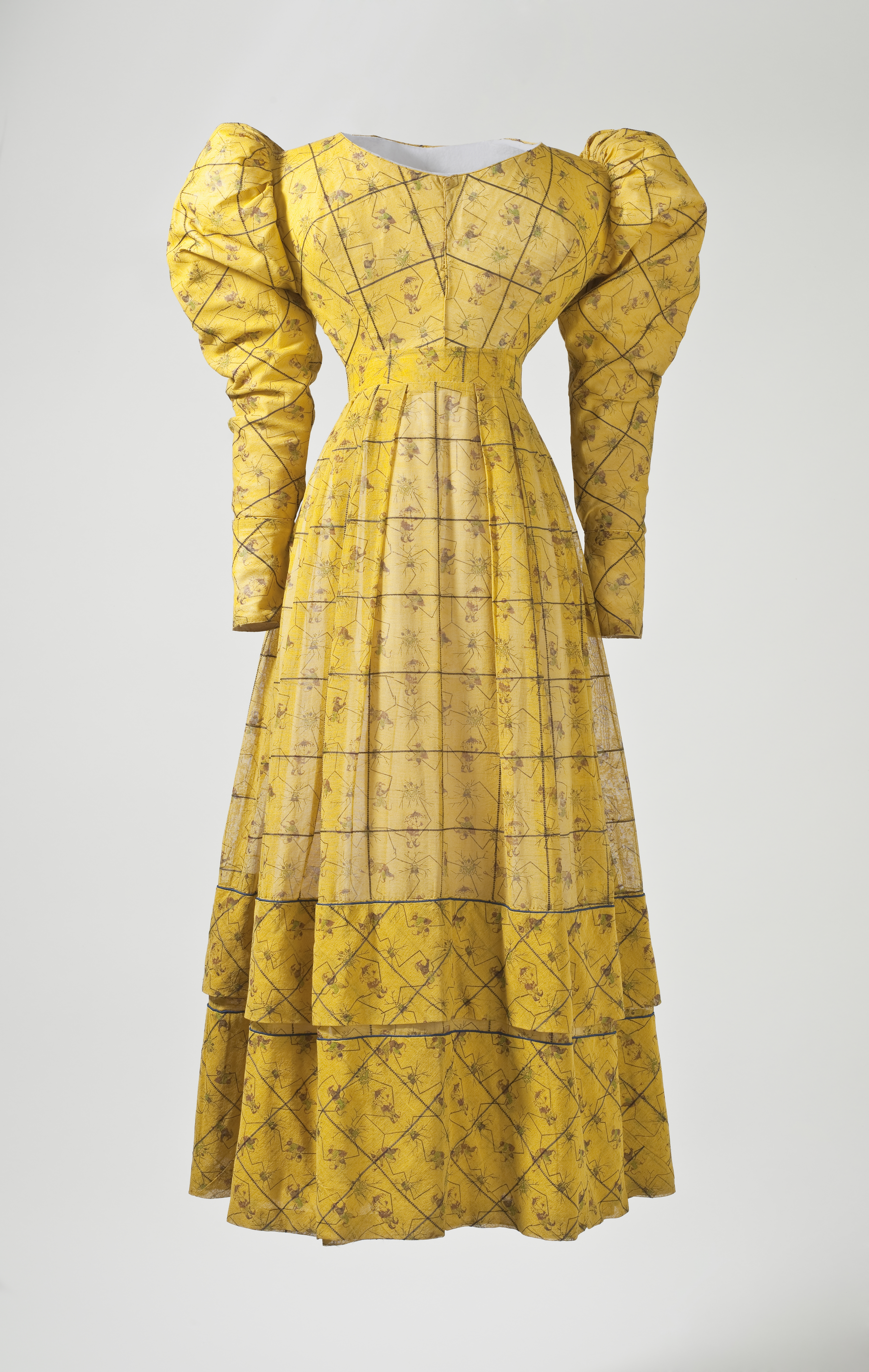
6 - c. 1827

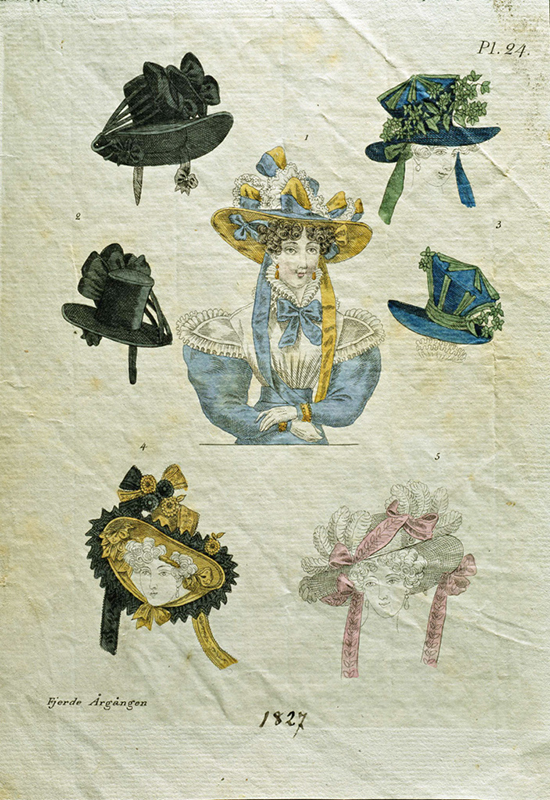
7 - 1827

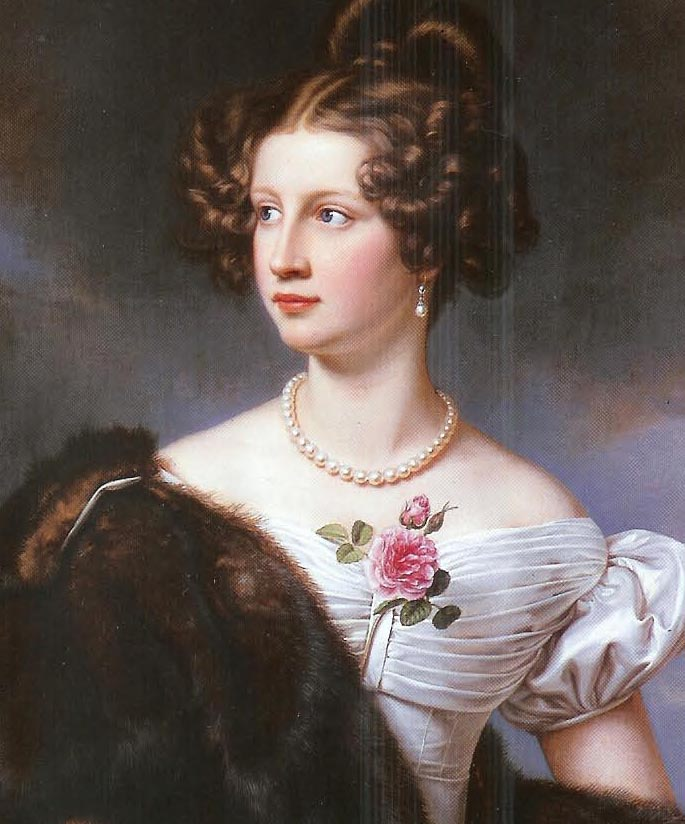
8 – 1828

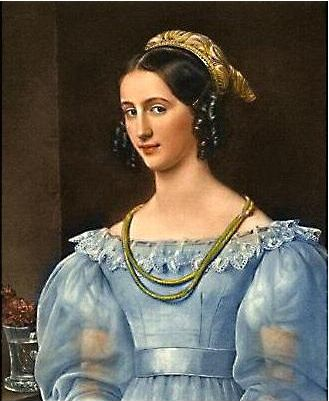
9 – 1829

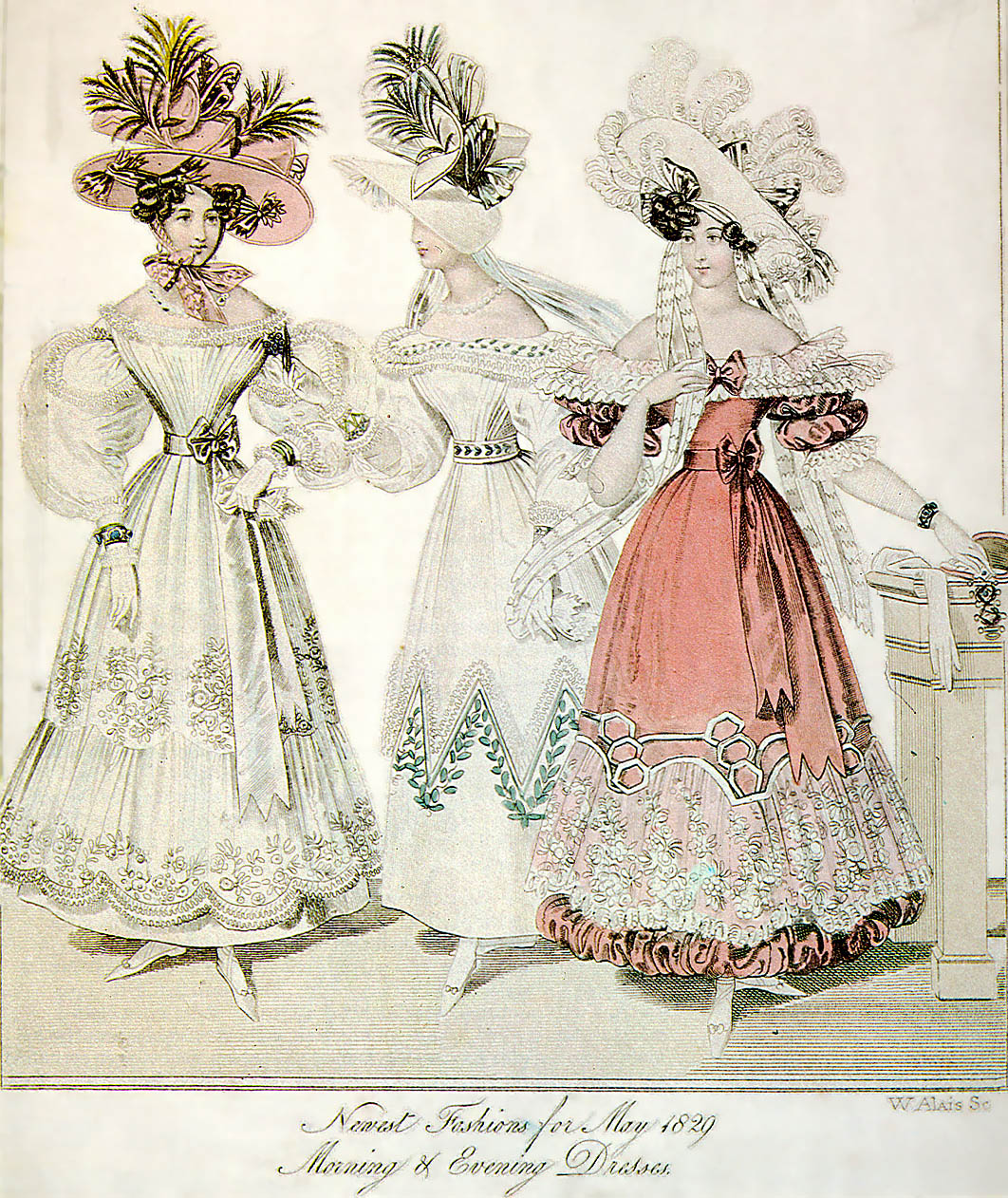
10 - 1829

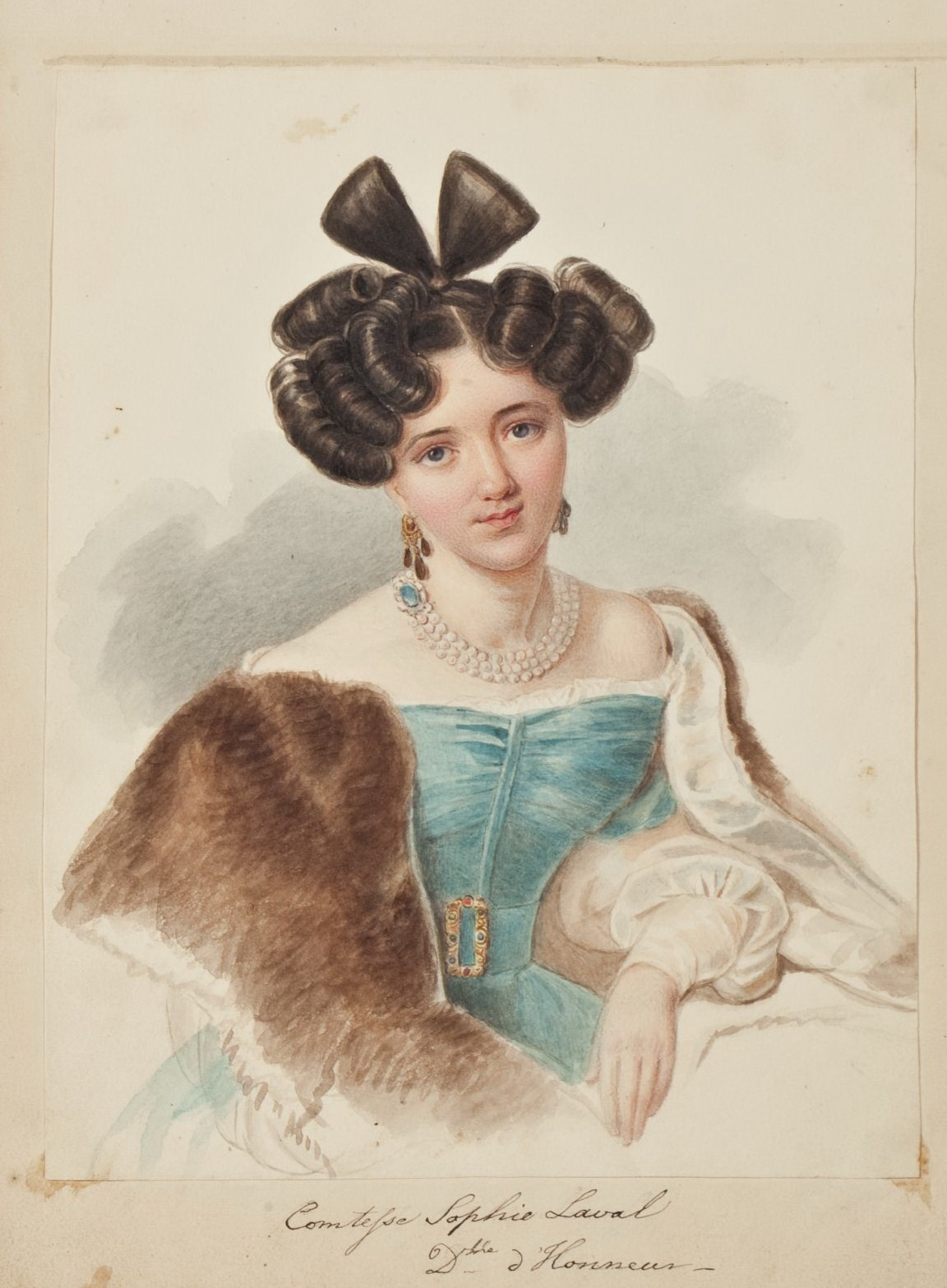
11 - ca 1829

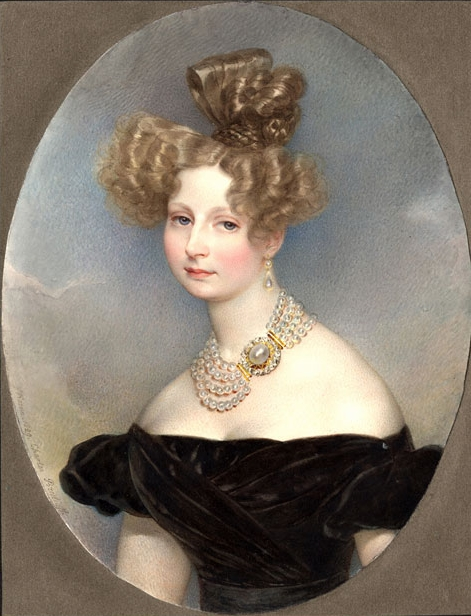
12 - 1829

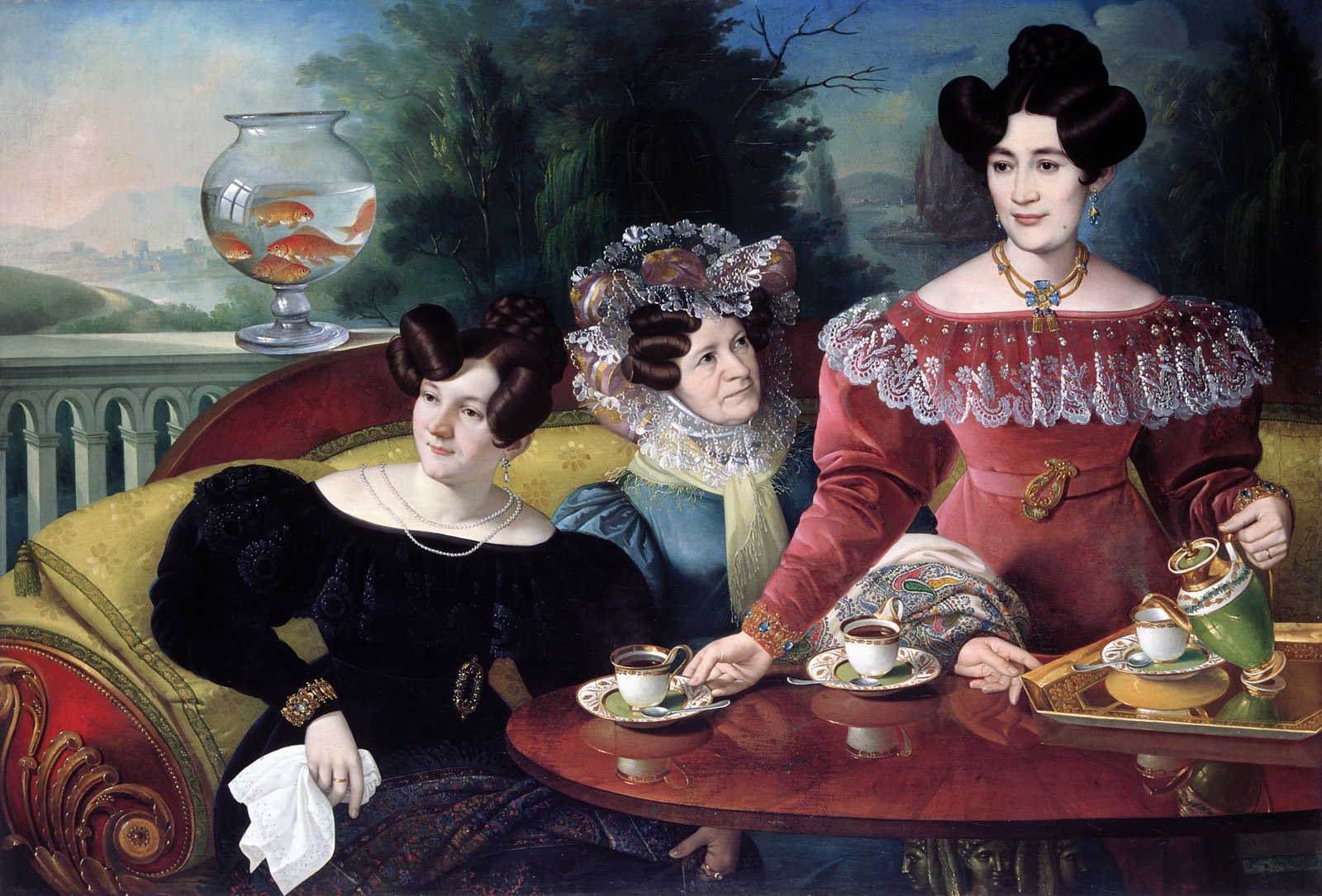
13 - 1829
1. Madame Marie Marcotte wears a brown gown with a wide buckled belt, full sleeves, and a sheer collar with shell buttons. Her hair is worn in elaborate curls on the sides and on top. 1826.
2. Viennese fashion plate of 1826. Stripes run in different directions on the skirt, hem and sleeves, and the hat is lined with plaid fabric and trimmed with a matching ribbon.
3. Comtesse de MacMahon wears a satin dress with a conical skirt trimmed with horizontal frills at the hem. Matching frills accent the new wide-puffed sleeves. She wears a large hat decorated with ostrich plumes, latter half of the 1820s.
4. Auguste Strobl wears a sheer overdress with full sleeves in the new fashion over a white gown with short puffed undersleeves. A wide ribbon sash is fastened with a gold buckle. German, 1827.
5. Sarah Stanton Blake wears a frilled indoor cap trimmed with sheer ribbon and a high-necked chemise or chemisette under her black dress and scarlet shawl. Massachusetts, c. 1827.
6. Dress of silk and cotton gauze, dyed chrome yellow and block printed with a chinoiserie pattern, Europe, c. 1827. Los Angeles County Museum of Art, M.2007.211.937.
7. Fashion poster with 1827 hats.
8. Gown of Amalie von Krüdener in 1828 shows the beginnings of the dropped shoulder and wide sleeve puff that would flower in the 1830s. Hair is worn in elaborate side curls, and the knotted bun is higher on the crown of the head. German.
9. Regina Daxenberger wears sheer blue oversleeves with short puffed undersleeves. Her fitted bodice has pairs of waist darts, 1829.
10. Fashion plate shows "Newest Fashions for May 1829: Morning and Evening Dresses"
11. Comtesse Sophie Laval wears a blue gown with a buckled belt. Her hair is worn in two high loops with a mass of curls on the sides. End of 1820s
12. Grand Duchess Elena Pavlovna with an elaborate hairstyle, 1829
13. Three ladies, 1829

== Men's wear ==
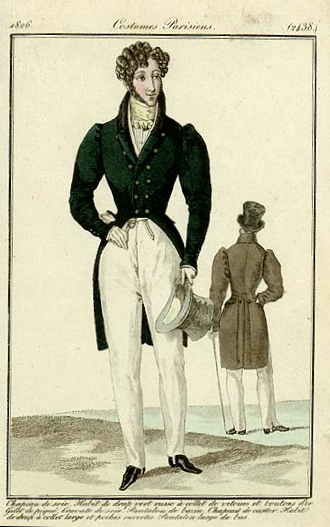
Men's fashion plate, 1826

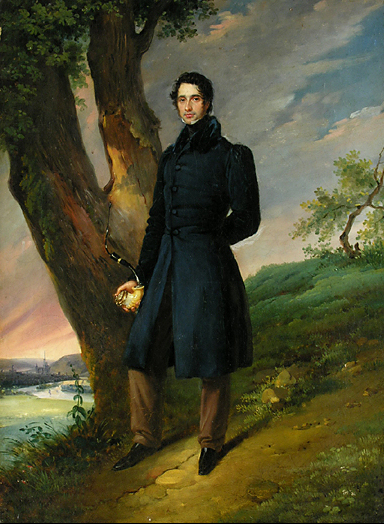
This man wears a dark coat with a high shawl collar. His sleeves have puffs at the shoulder and taper to the wrist. He wears light brown trousers, 1828.

=== Overview ===
By the mid-1820s, men's fashion plates show a shapely ideal silhouette with broad shoulders emphasized with puffs at the sleevehead, a narrow waist, and very curvy hips.

A corset was required to achieve the tiny waistline shown in fashion plates. Already de rigueur in the wardrobes of military officers, men of all middle and upper classes began wearing them, out of the necessity to fit in with the fashionable gentry. Usually referred to as "girdles", "belts" or "vests" (as "corsets" and "stays" were considered feminine terms) they were used to cinch the waist to sometimes tiny proportions, although sometimes they were simply whalebone-stiffened waistcoats with lacing in the back. Many contemporary cartoonists of the time poked fun at the repressed nature of the tightlaced gentlemen, although the style grew in popularity nonetheless. This was the case especially amidst middle-class men, who often used their wardrobe to promote themselves, at least in their minds, to a higher class — hence the dandy was born.

The emergence of wool as a primary fabric choice for men's outer garments led to a revolution in tailoring that allowed fit and finish to be of the utmost importance as opposed to ornamentation. This revolution allowed for an idealized classical silhouette to be materialized in men's fashion.

=== Shirts and cravats ===
Shirts of linen or cotton featured tall standing collars and were worn with wide cravats tied in a soft bow.

=== Coats and waistcoats ===
Around 1820, coats began to be made in an entirely new way. The tails and lapels were cut separately and subsequently attached to the coat. This ensured a better fit, a greater following of the body's contours, and more consistent positioning, even when the coat was unbuttoned. The tails themselves were narrow, pointed, and fell just below the knee. The shoulders were broad and the coat stood off the chest, yet was snug at the waist. Coats also were padded at the chest and waist. The collars and lapels were also padded in order to stiffen them. The collars were high and shawl-like in order to frame the face. Coats were cut straight across the waist. Waistcoats were buttoned high on the chest. Cutaway coats were worn as in the previous period for formal daywear, but the skirts might almost meet at the front waist.

Frock coats had the same nipped-in waist and full skirts. Very fashionable sleeves were gathered or pleated into a slightly puffed "leg of mutton" shape. Coats could be made of wool or velvet, and jewel colors like bottle green and midnight blue were high style. Double-breasted coats were very much in fashion throughout the decade.

=== Trousers and breeches ===
Trousers underwent a notable change in the 1820s. The new fit was a product of the French Revolution as it was considered uncouth to wear attire that looked wealthy. The length of the pant changed from below the knee to below the ankle and the fit of the pant loosened slightly from the first decade of the 19th century. The pants featured a small waistline and flared out slightly at the hip with small pleats, creating the image of fullness in the hip region. The introduction of straps that went under the foot, known as stirrup pants, also changed the shape and fit of these trousers.

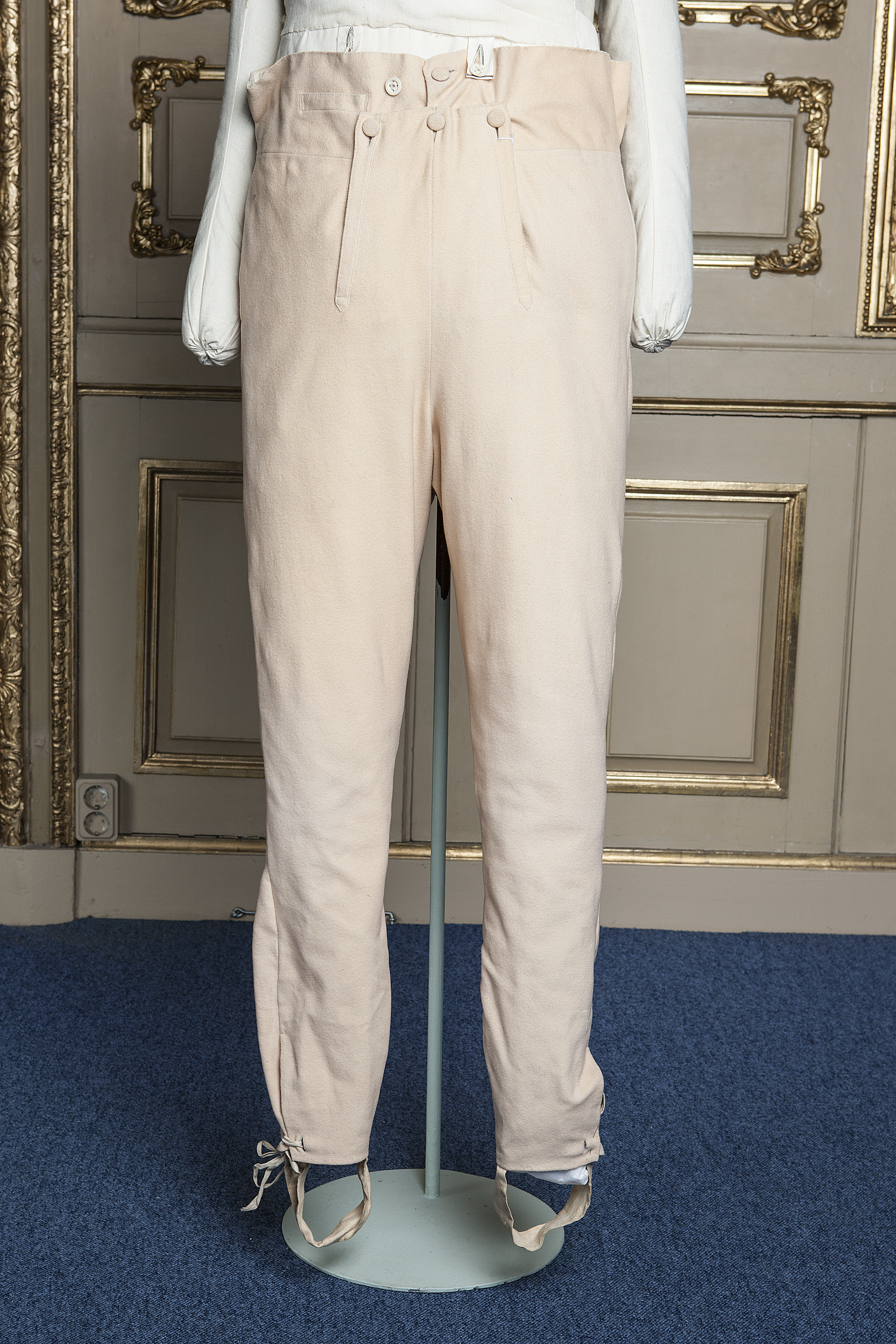
Fall front trousers with foot straps, 1829

Full-length light-colored trousers were worn for day; these were cut full through the hips and thighs, tapering to the ankles. They were held smoothly in place by straps fastened under the square-toed shoes. Dark trousers were worn for evening wear, and breeches were worn for formal functions at the British court (as they would be throughout the century). Breeches were also worn for horseback riding and other country pursuits, especially in Britain, with tall fitted boots.

=== Hats and hairstyles ===
Tall, silk hats again came into style. They were seen as a comfortable and light way to protect against sun and rain and were adequate for travelling and hunting. The crowns of tall hats also became curvy in keeping with the new style, and began to flare from the headband to the top. Curled hair and sideburns were fashionable.

=== Shoes ===
Rubber was introduced to Europe and America and created a shift in shoes from the pattens and clogs to the galosh. The galosh was soft and gummy in warm weather and hard and stiff in the cold. The style of men's shoes closely mirrored that of women's, as they were narrow, heelless slippers with low-cut vamps. They were very flimsy looking, as though they were held on by suction cups, for the leather barely covered the toes and hardly gripped the heel.

=== Style gallery ===
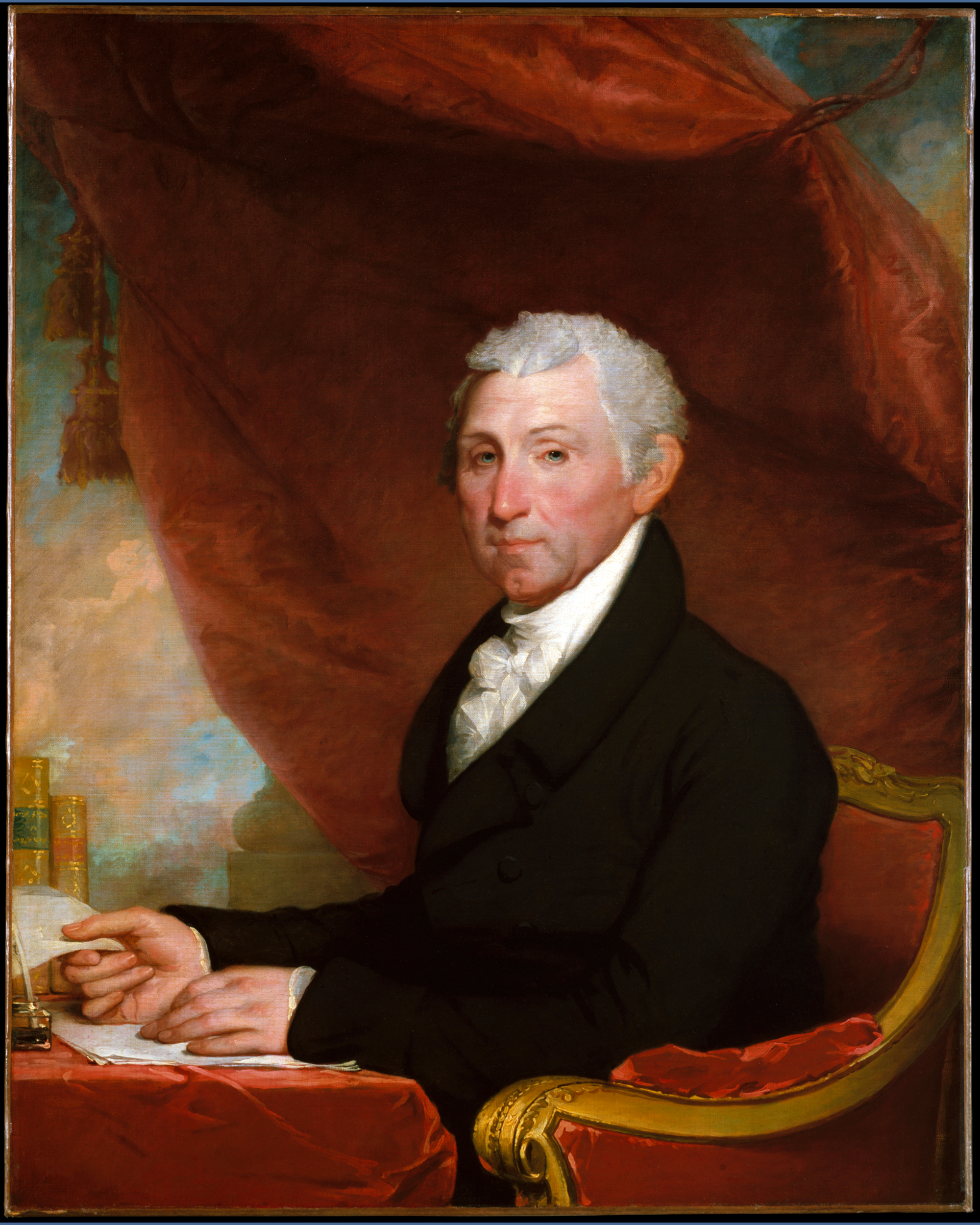
1 – 1820–22

2 – 1823

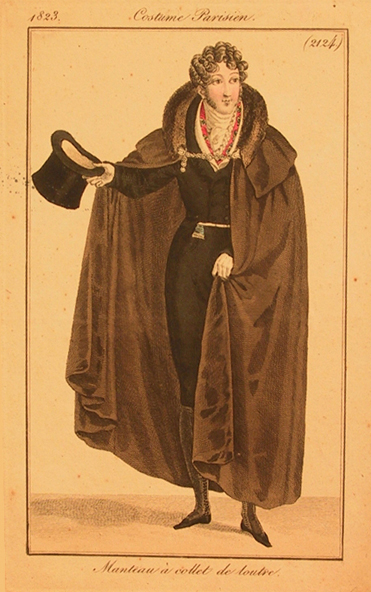
3 – 1823

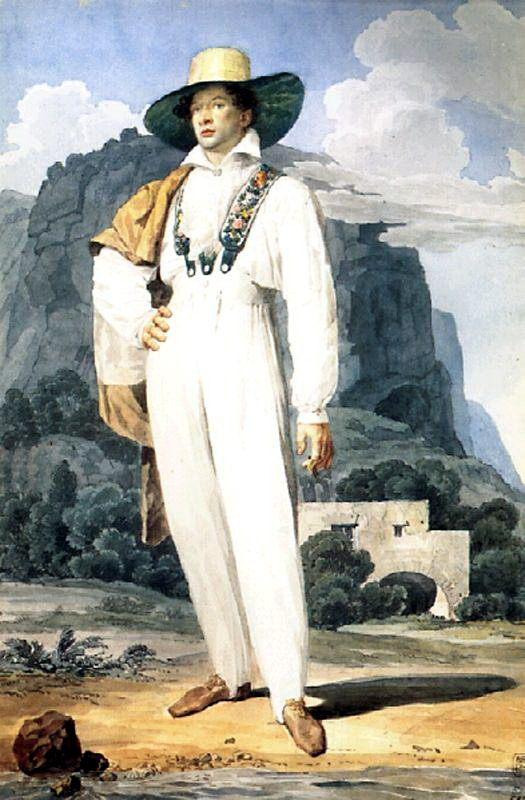
4 – 1824

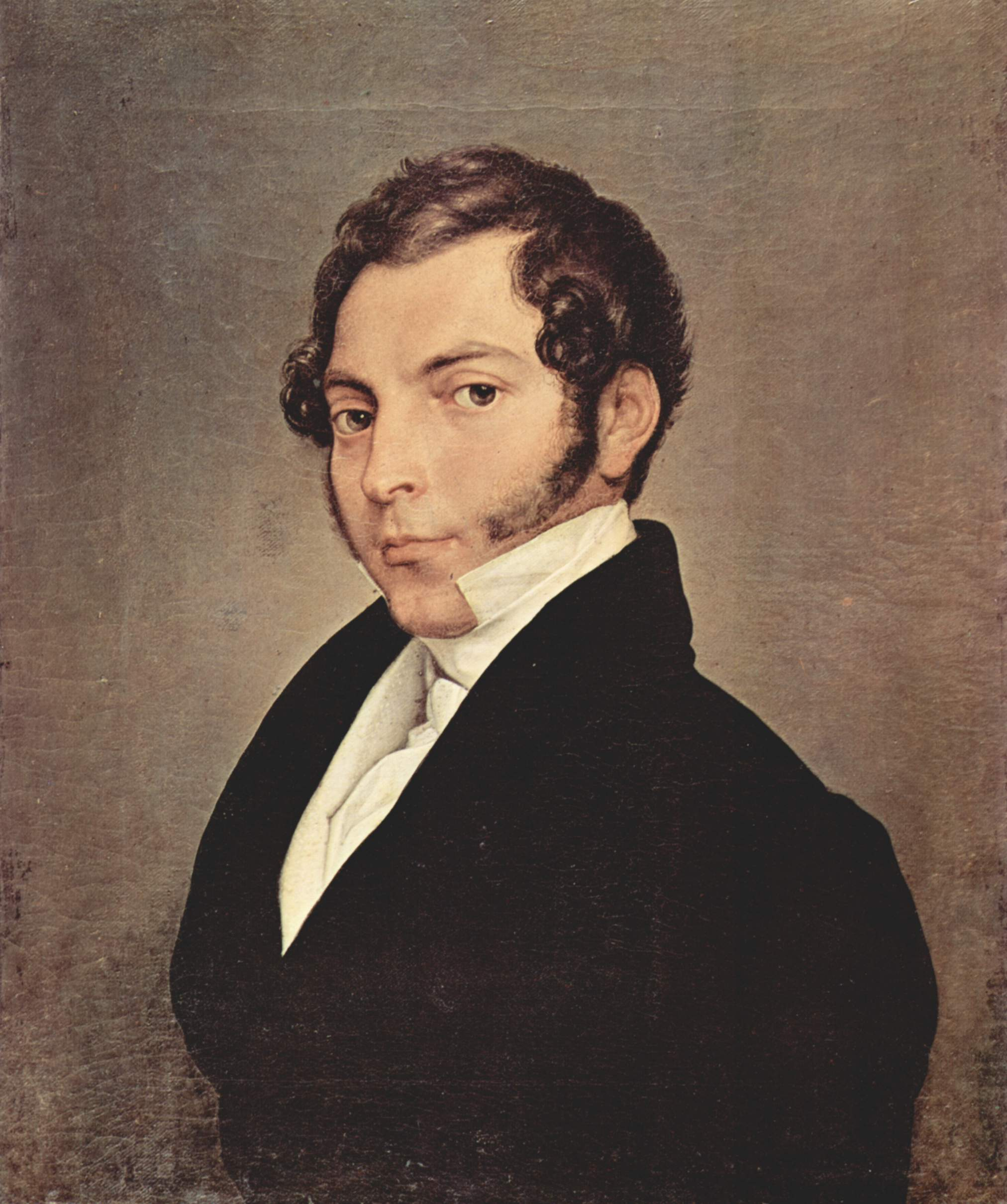
5 – 1825

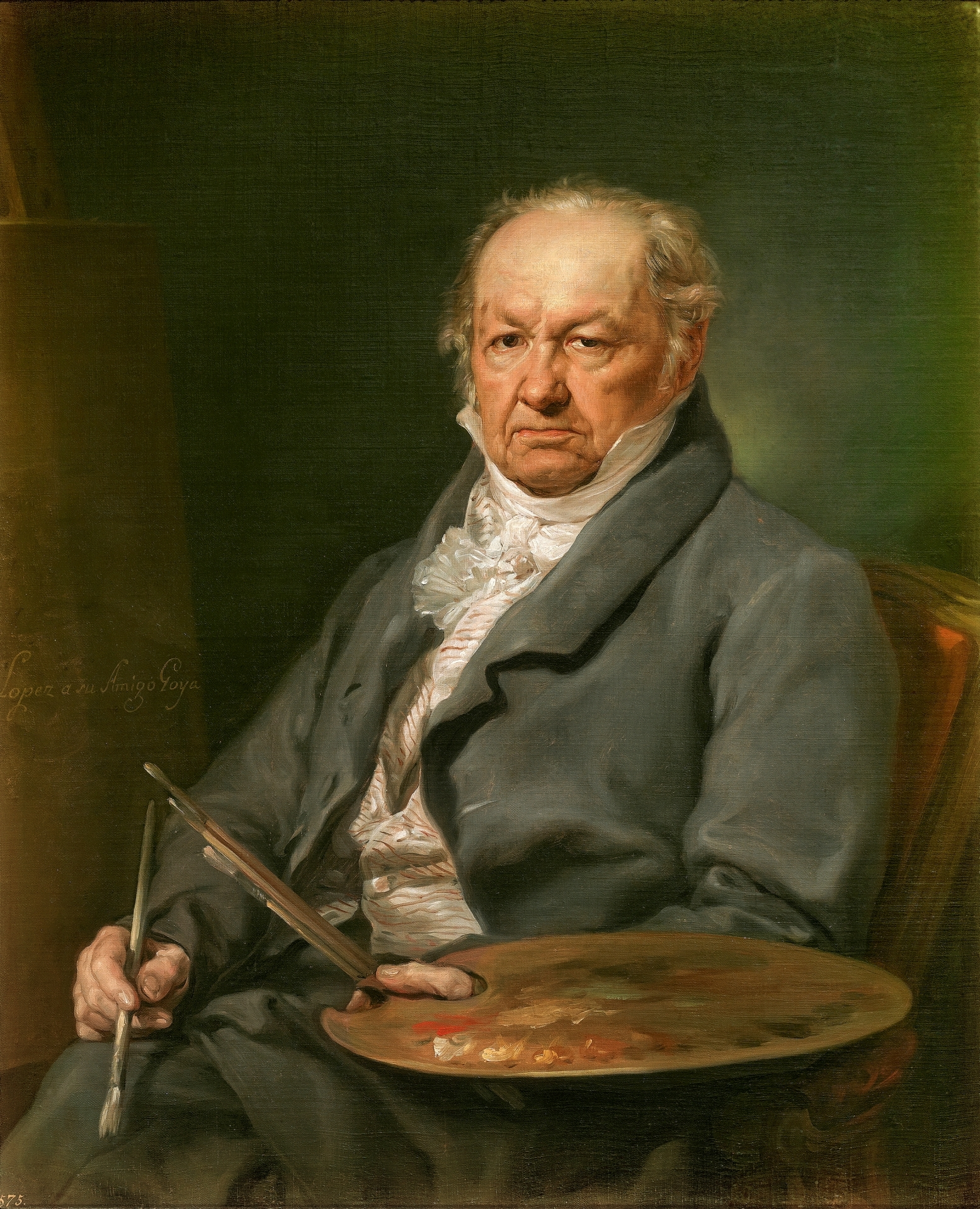
6 – 1826

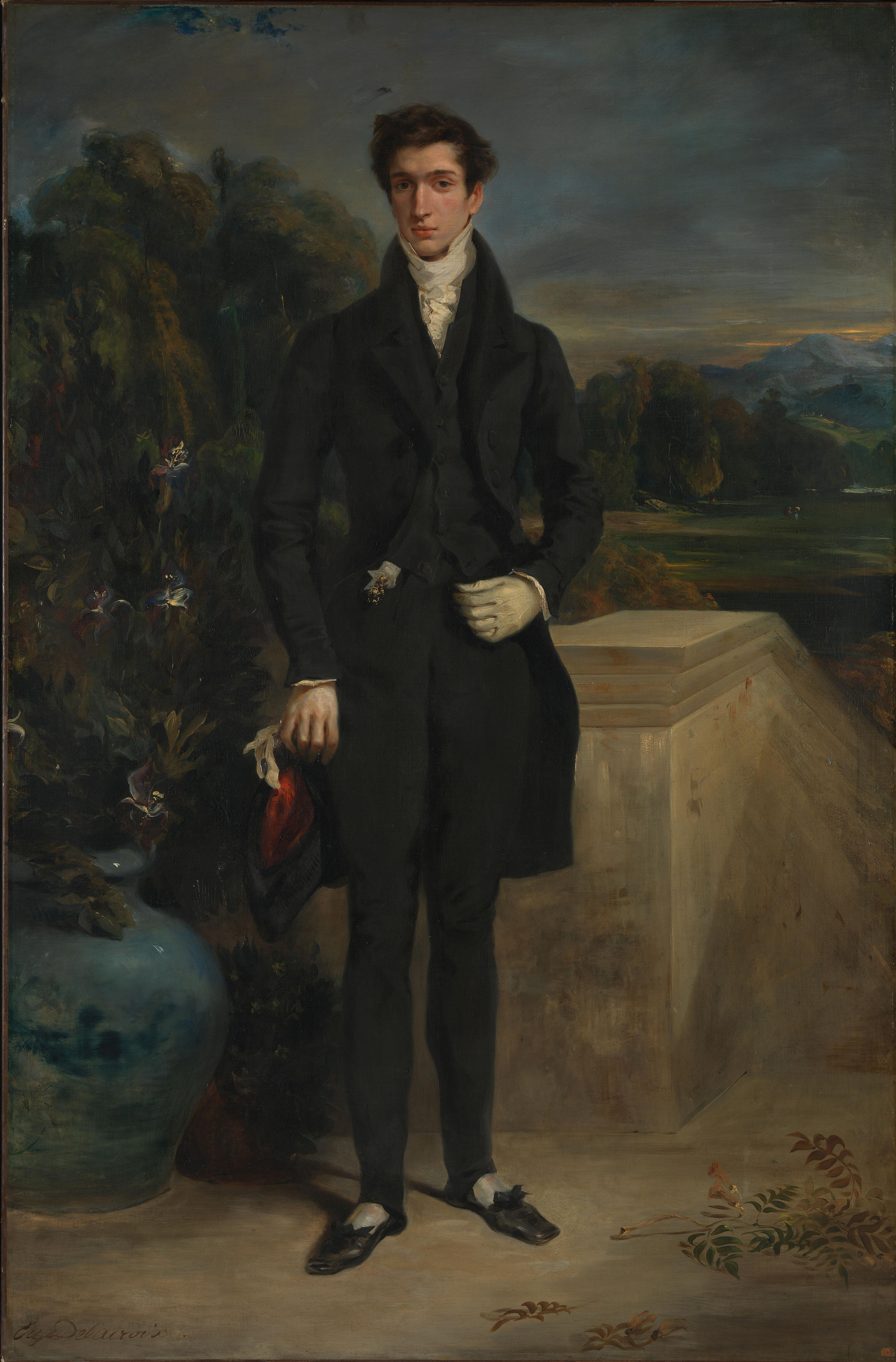
7 – 1827

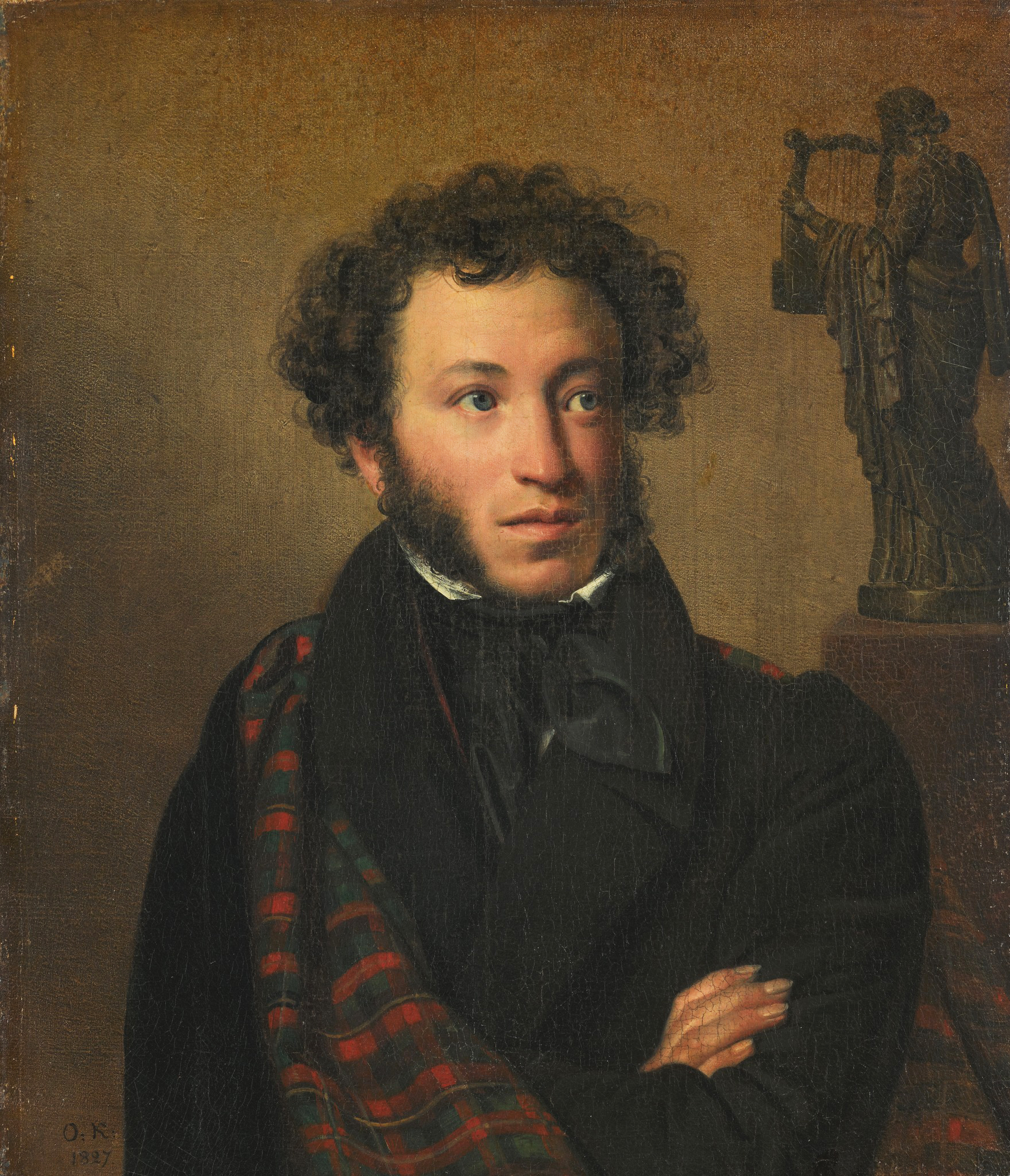
8 - 1827

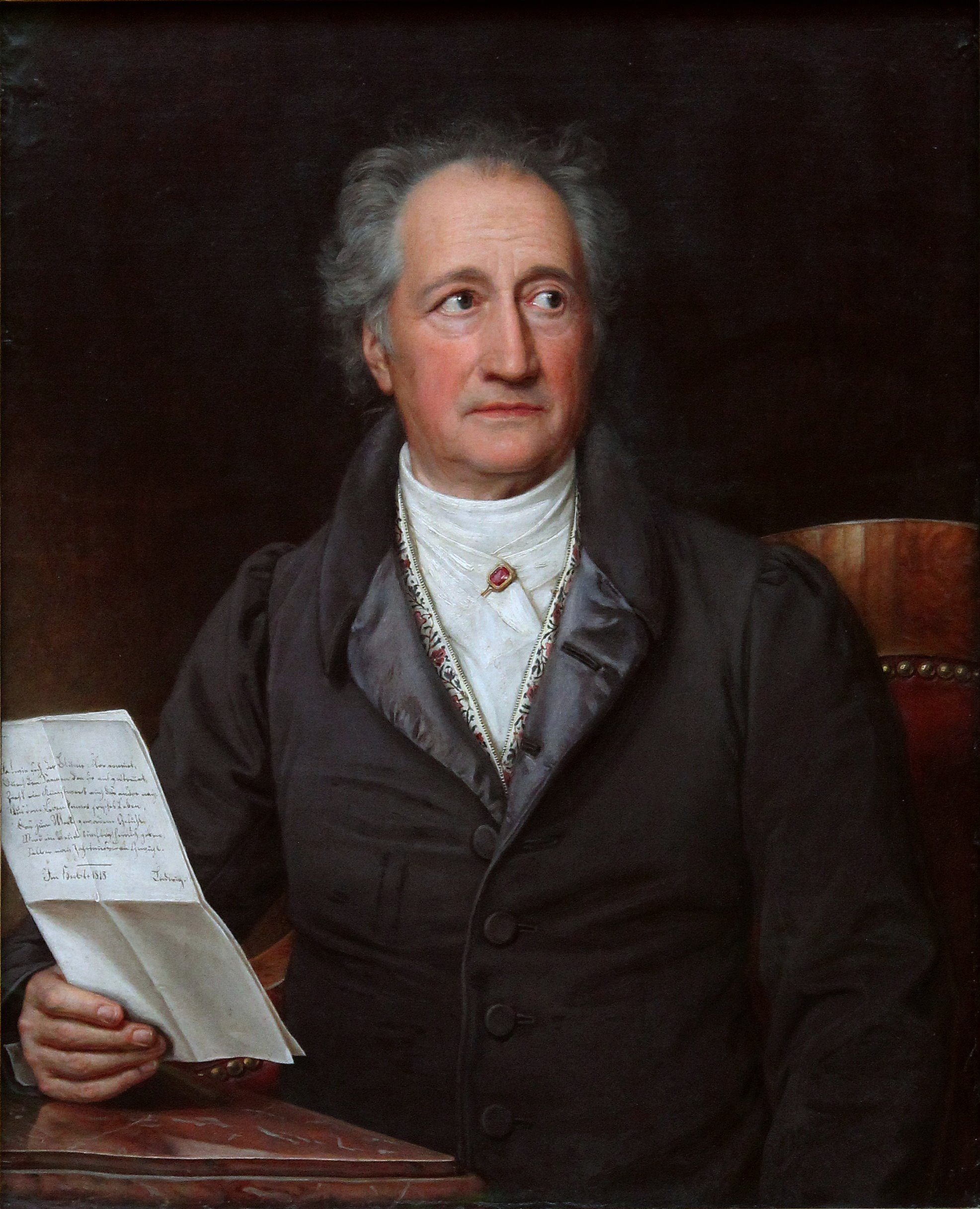
9 – 1828

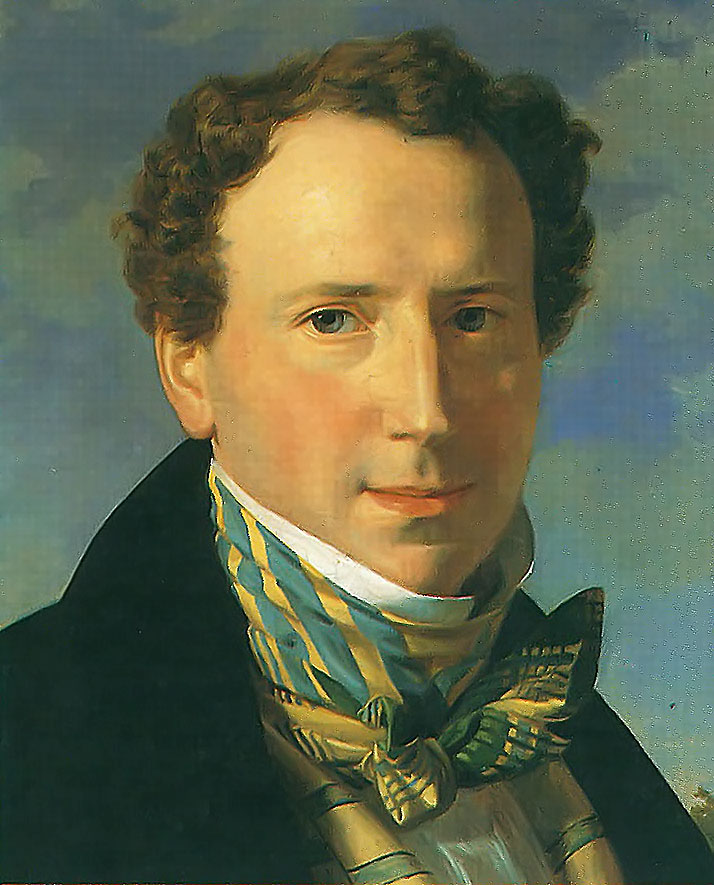
10 – 1828

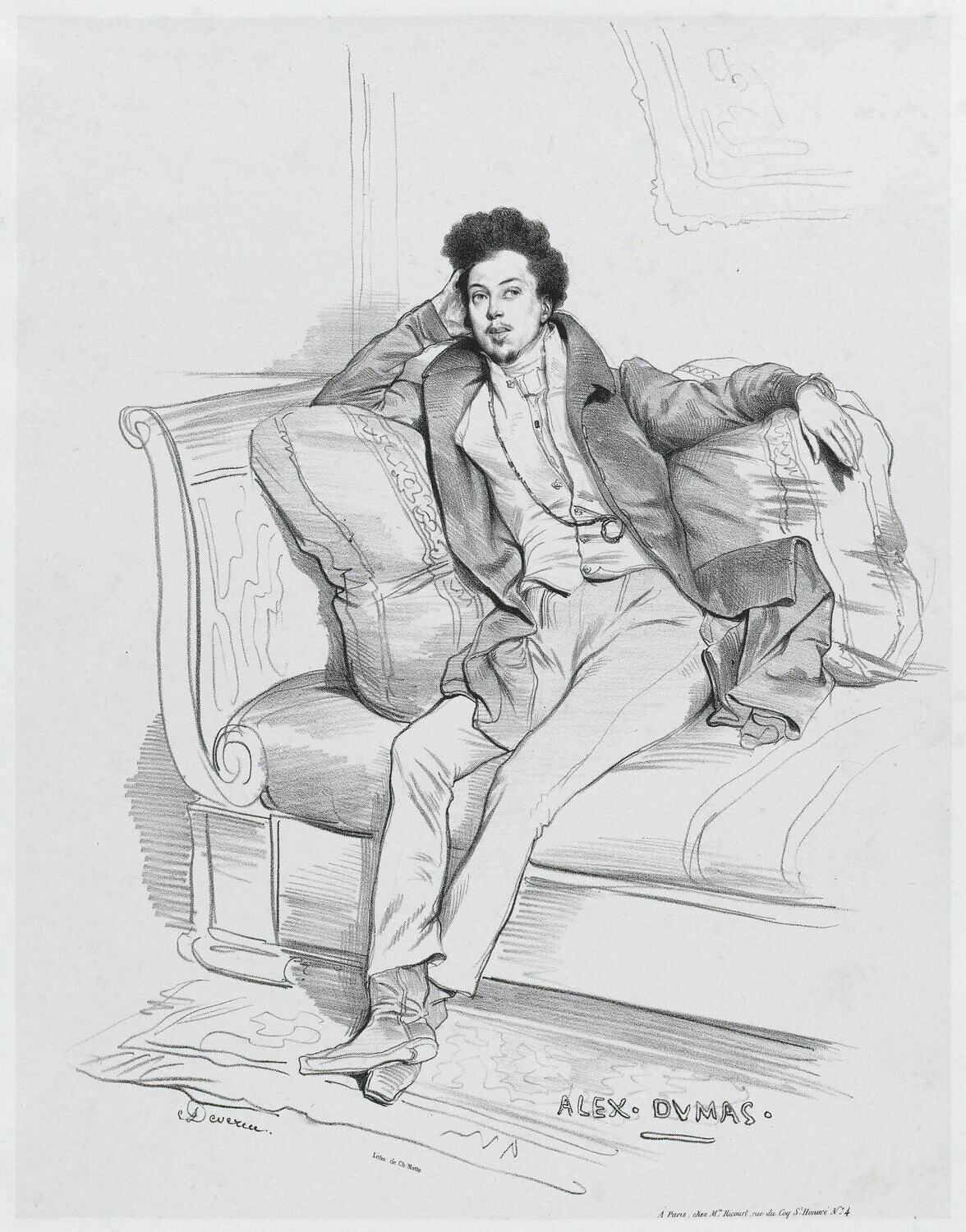
11 – 1829
1. President James Monroe wears a high shirt collar and white cravat tied in a wide bow. His jacket collar and lapels form a continuous curve very like a shawl collar. 1820–22.
2. Country clothes in the city: In this caricature by Richard Dighton, a stout man wears country clothes (breeches and riding boots) at the Royal Exchange in London. Hats of 1823 are not yet curvy, and the straight-bottomed waistcoat shows slightly below the coat in front.
3. French fashion plate shows an evening cape or manteau with a fur collar and shoulder cape, worn over dark formal breeches and double-breasted coat, 1823.
4. V. A. Perovsky wears trousers with foot straps and embroidered suspenders, white shirt and a sun hat, 1824.
5. Conte Ninni wears a black coat with a tall collar and a slight puff at the sleeve head over a tall-collared white shirt and white cravat, 1825.
6. Francisco de Goya wears a gray coat over a satin single-breasted waistcoat and a tall-collared shirt that reaches to his ears, with a white cravat. Spanish, 1826.
7. Baron Schwiter wears a dark cutaway coat, waistcoat, and narrow fitted pantaloons or trousers. His flat shoes have square toes and bows on the instep, and are worn with white stockings, 1827.
8. Alexander Pushkin wears a black coat, black silk cravat and plaid shawl. Russian, 1827.
9. Goethe wears a coat with a slight puff at the sleeve head, a satin lining turned back to form lapels, and a high contrasting collar over a patterned waistcoat. His white cravat is fastened with a gold pin. German, 1828.
10. In his self-portrait, Ferdinand Georg Waldmüller wears a striped cravat and striped waistcoat, both in dull gold and blue, 1828.
11. Portrait of Alexandre Dumas who wears a dark cutaway coat, matching trousers and waistcoat and boots, 1829.

== Caricature gallery ==
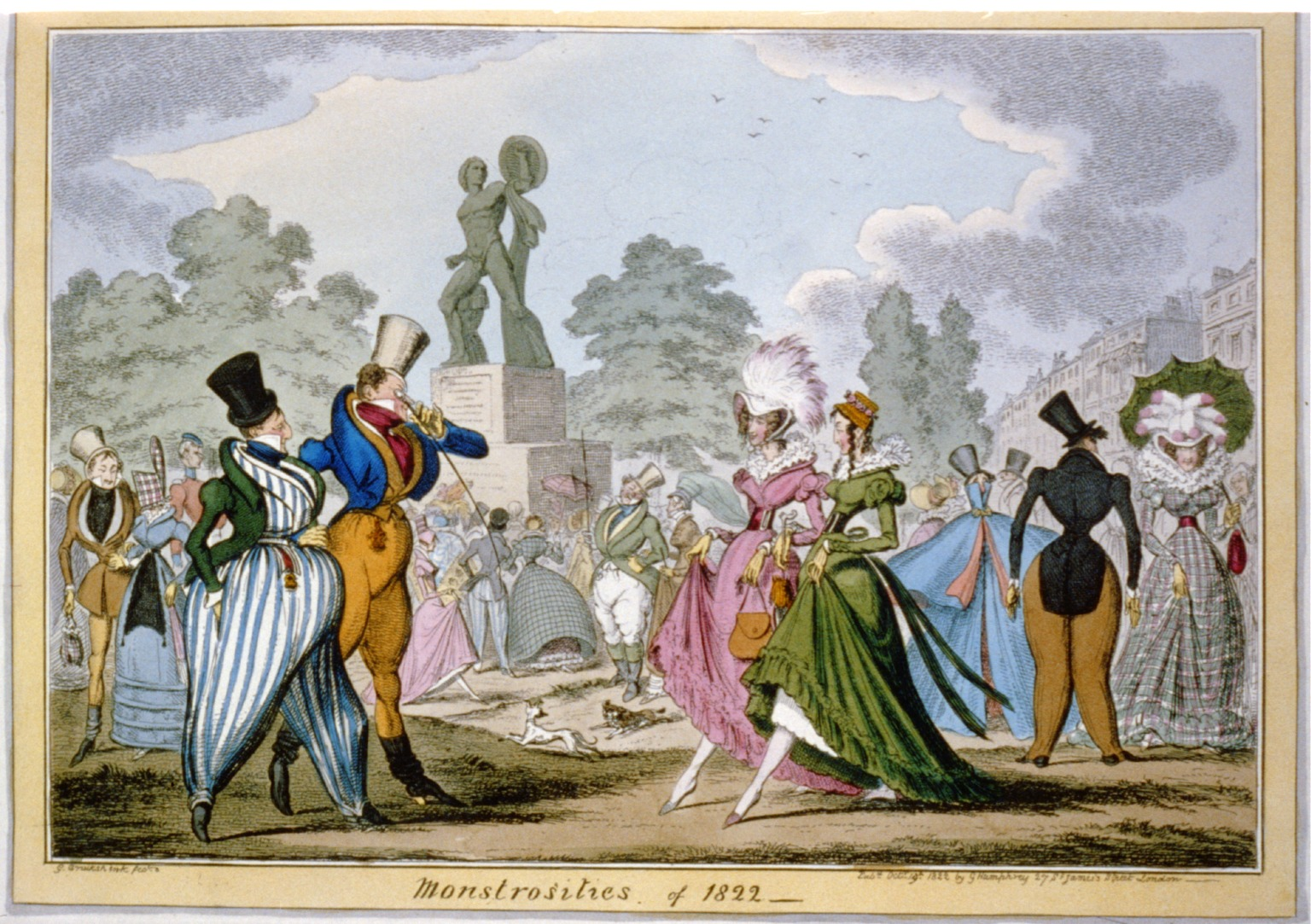
"Monstrosities of 1822," 1822 fashion satire.

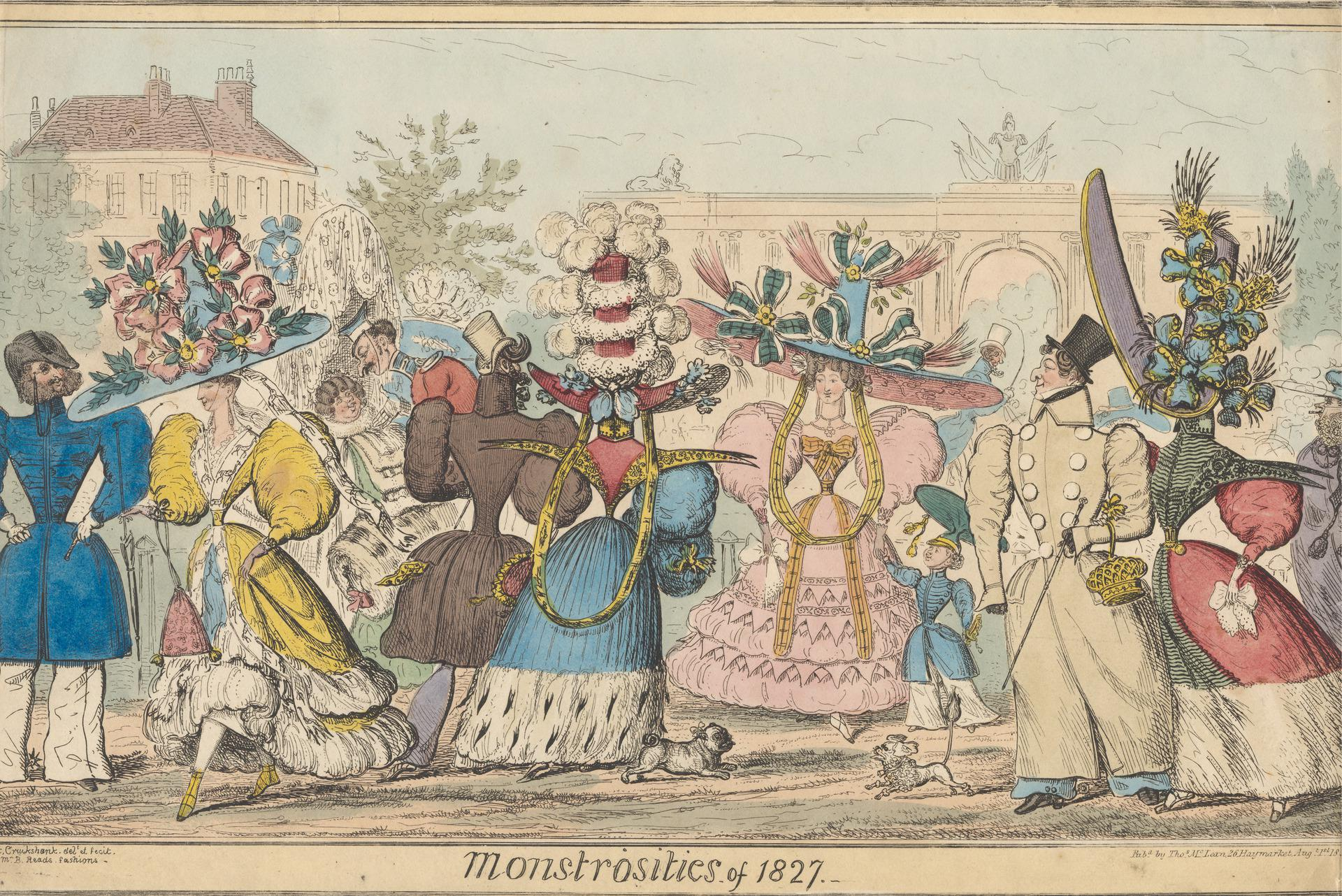
"Monstrosities of 1827," fashion satire.

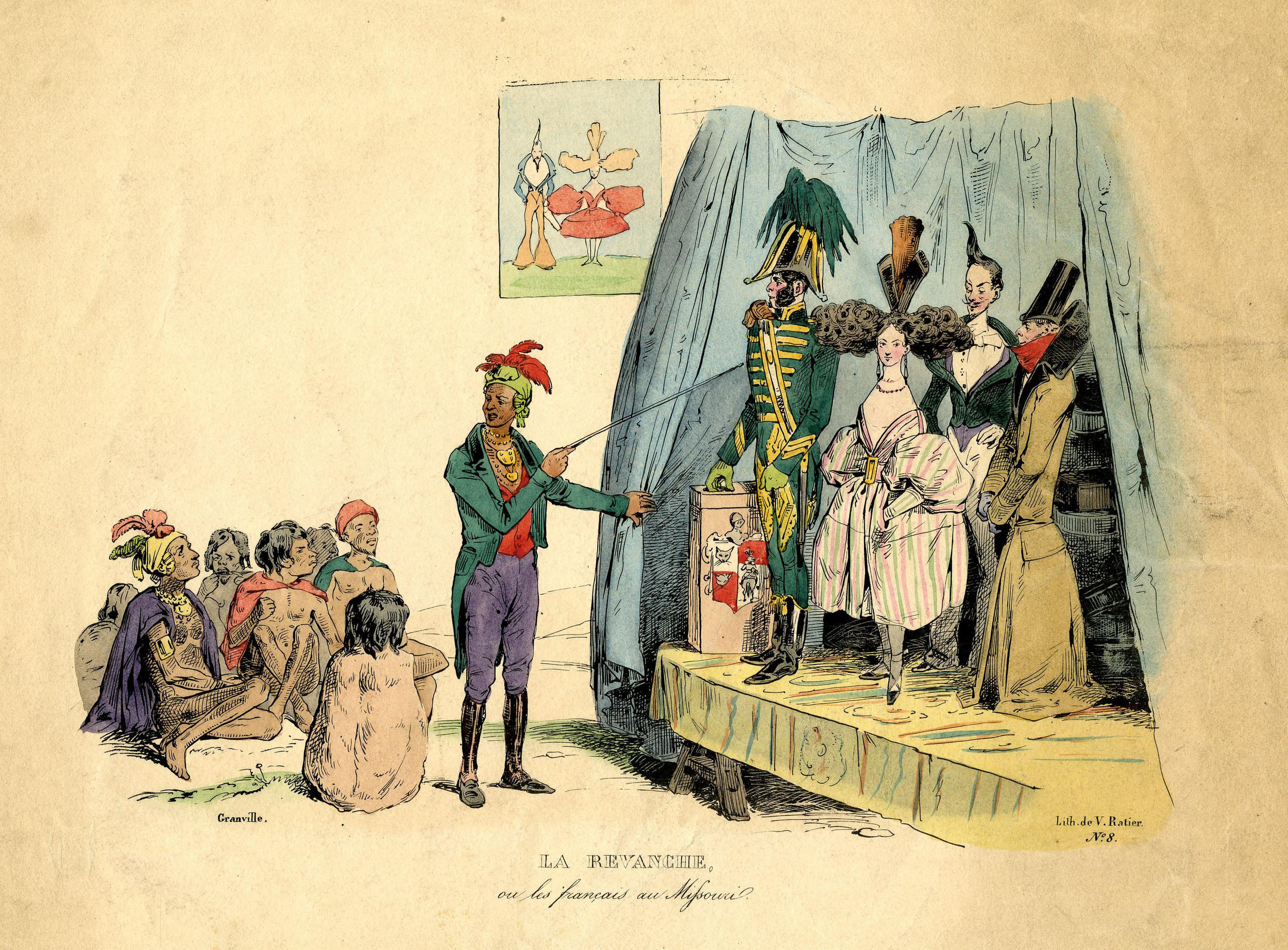
Fashionable French people exhibited to a Native American public, 1829

== Fashion plates ==
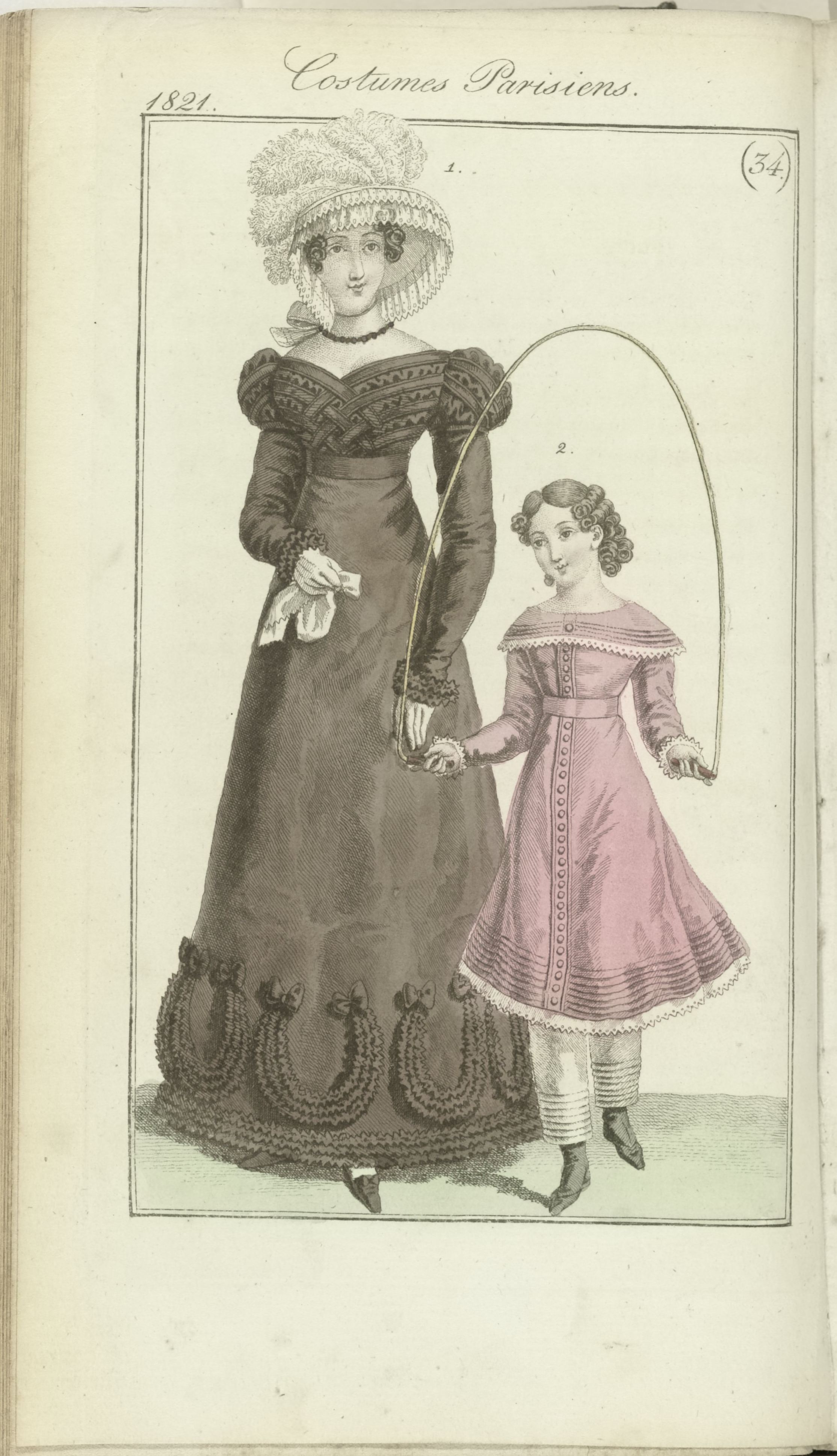
1821

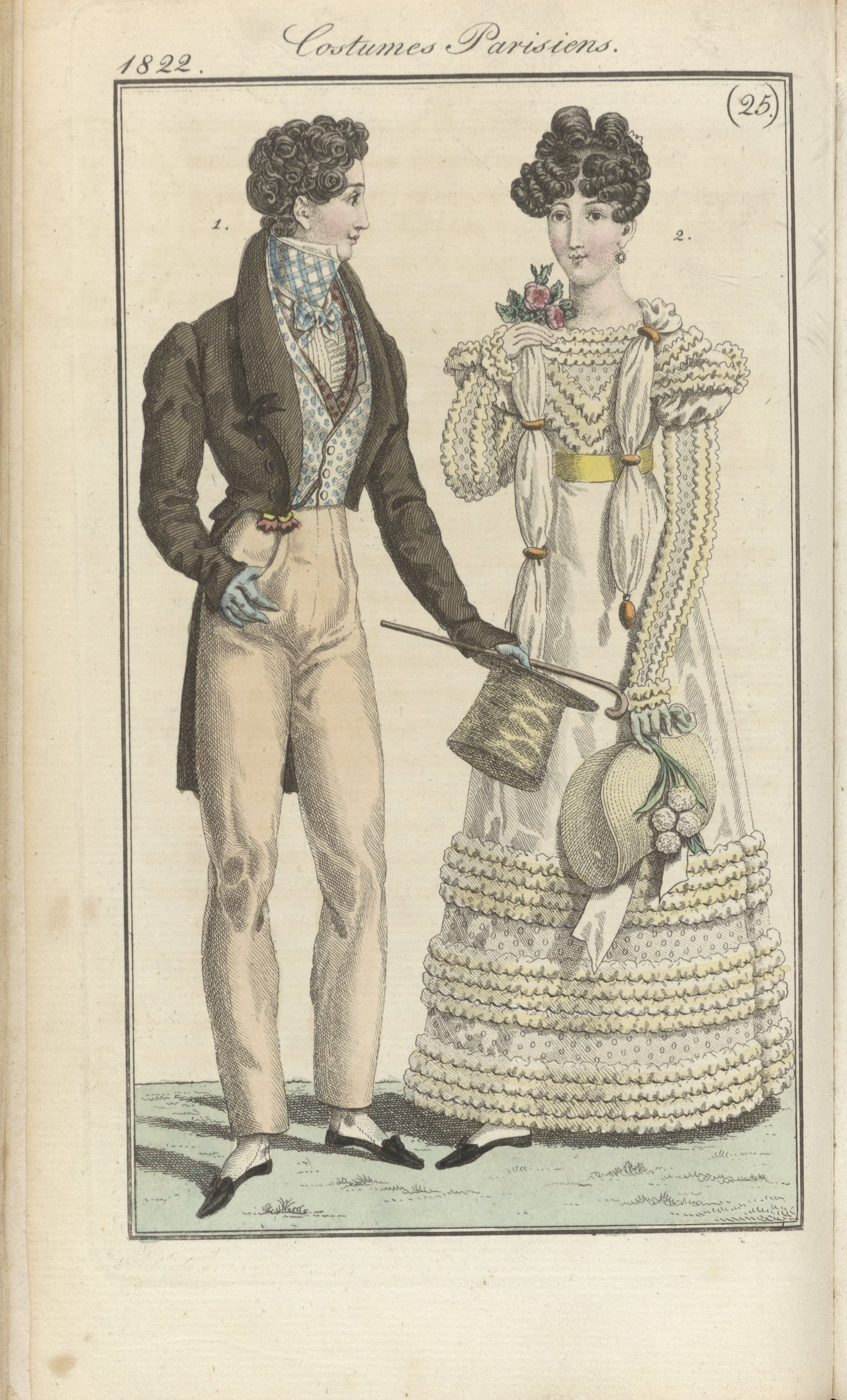
1822

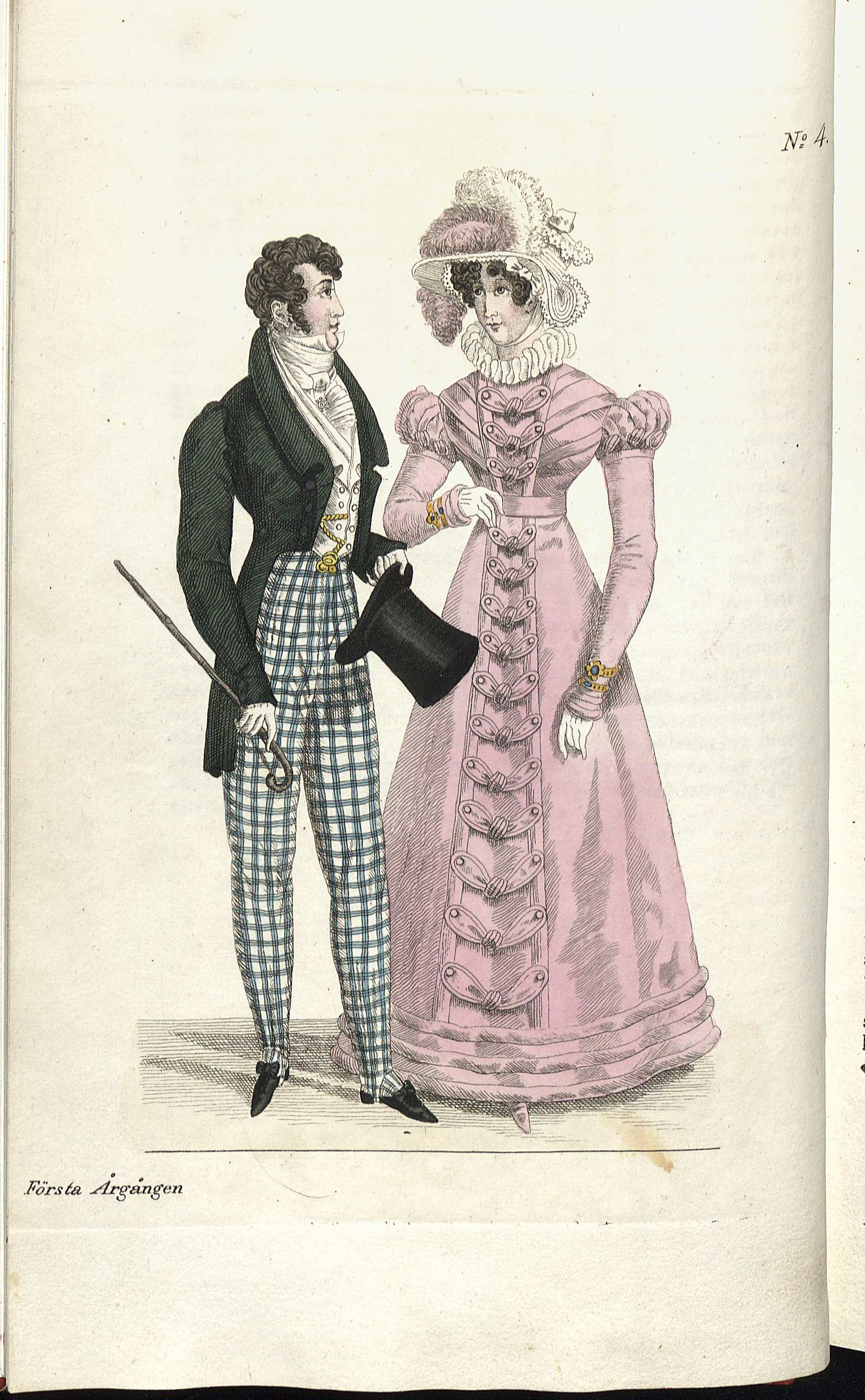
1823

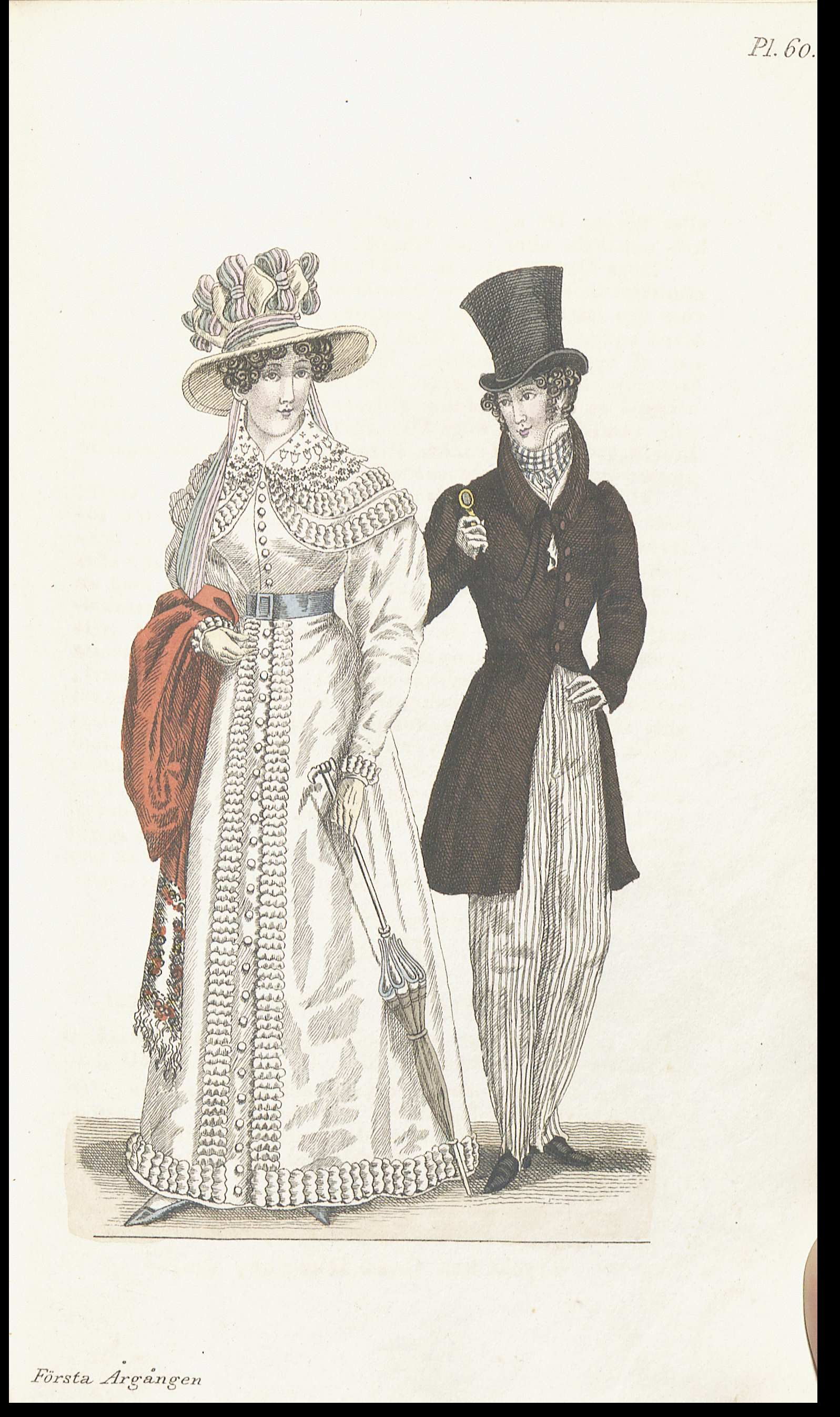
1824

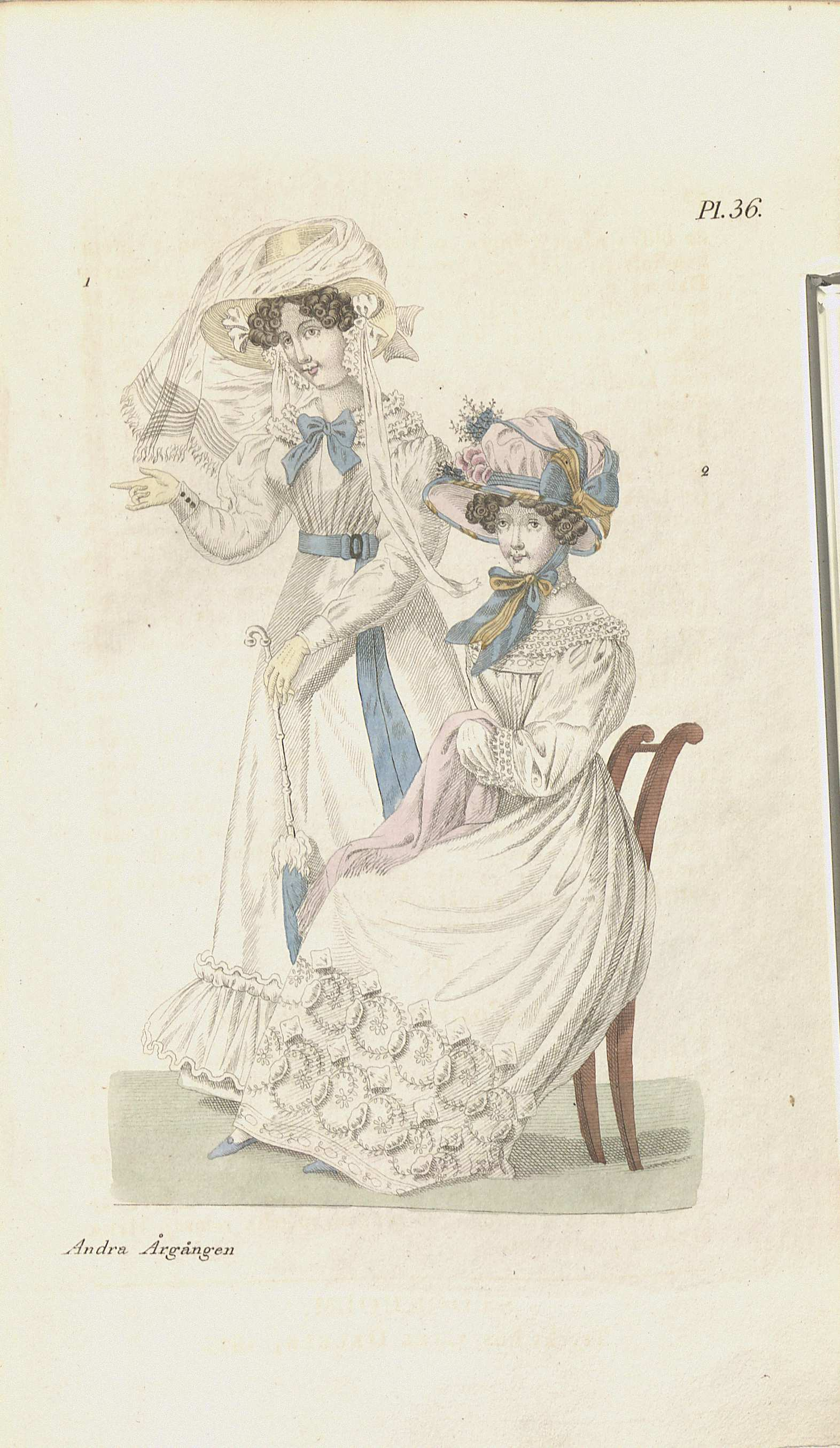
1825

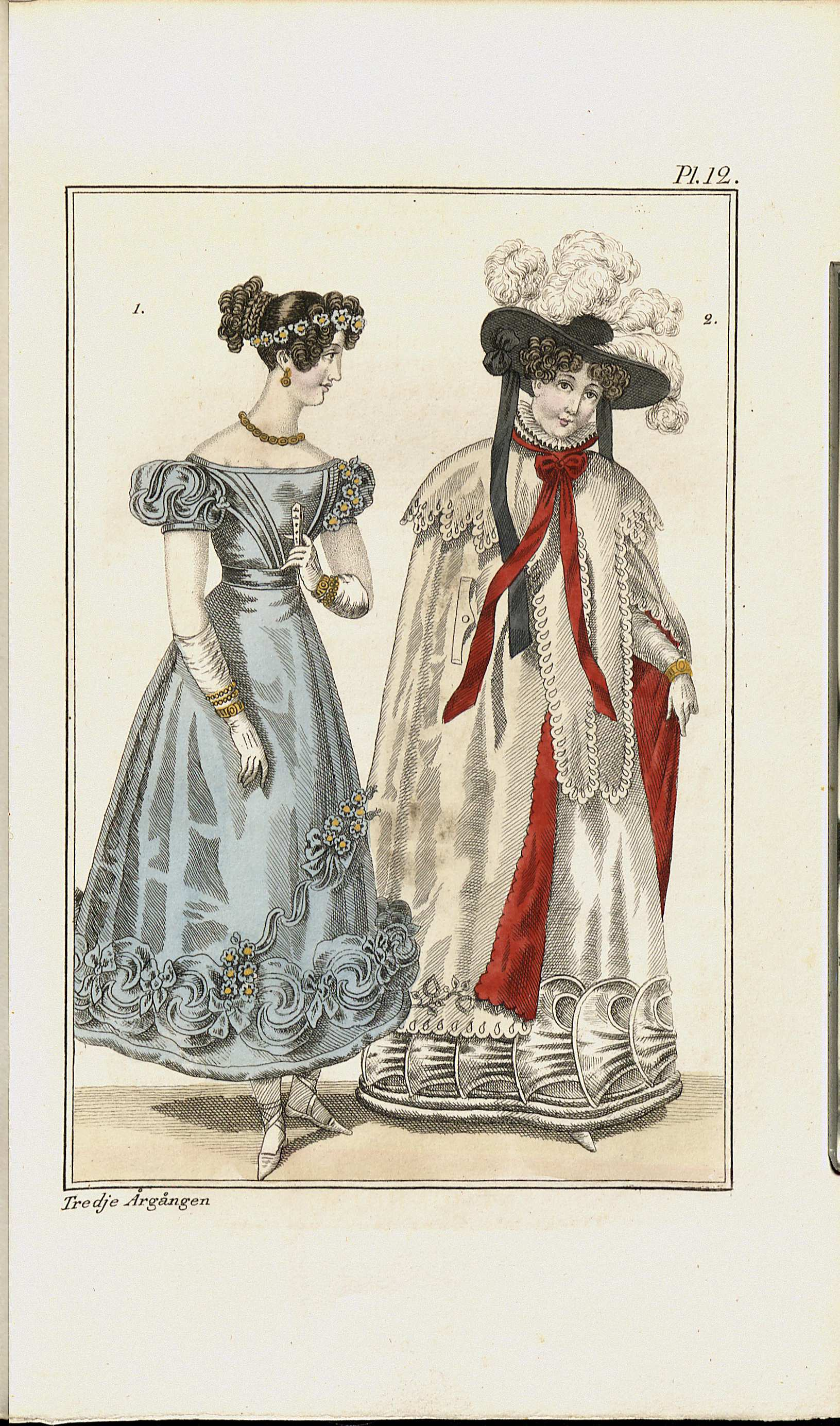
1826

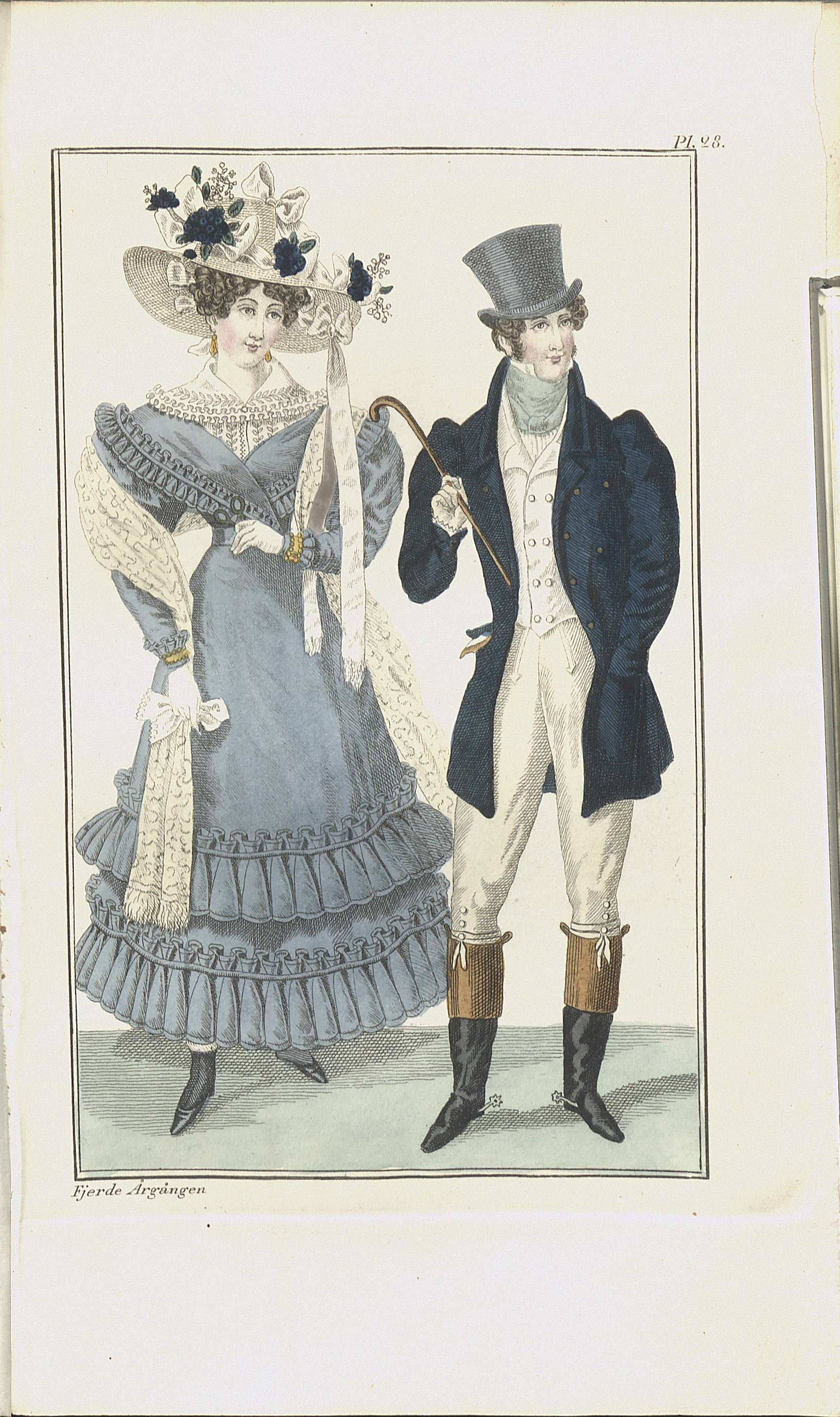
1827

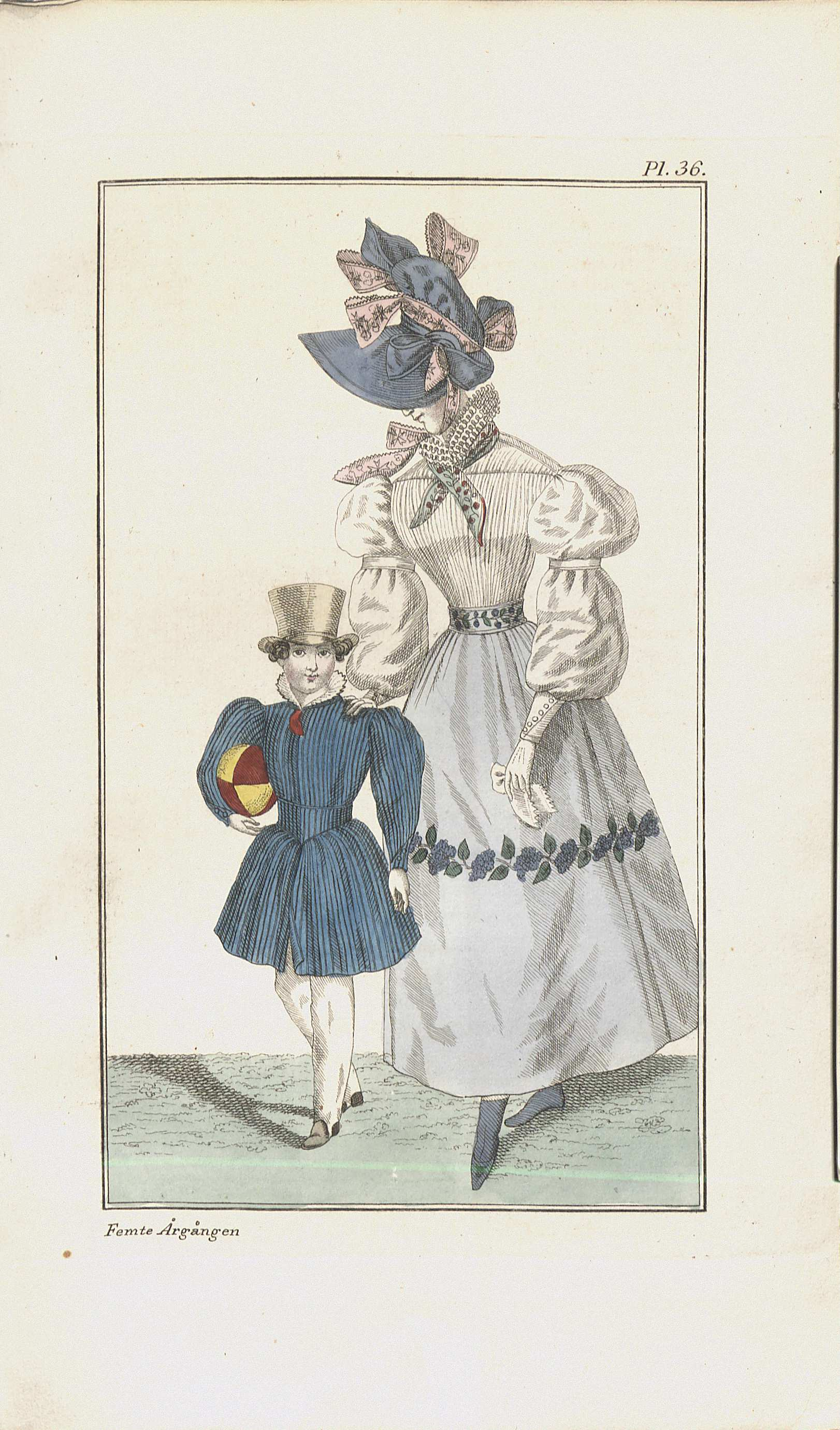
1828

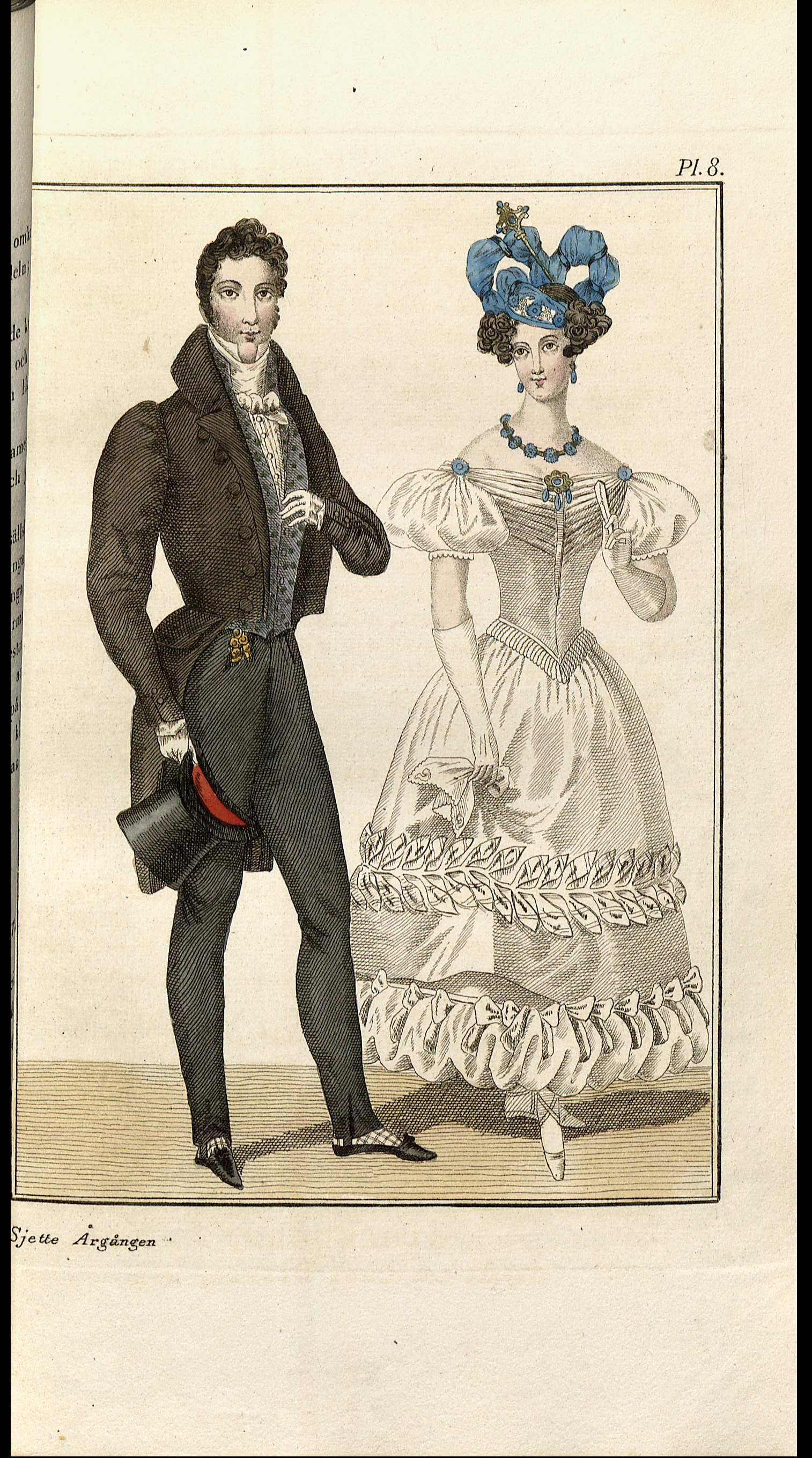
1829

== Children's fashion ==
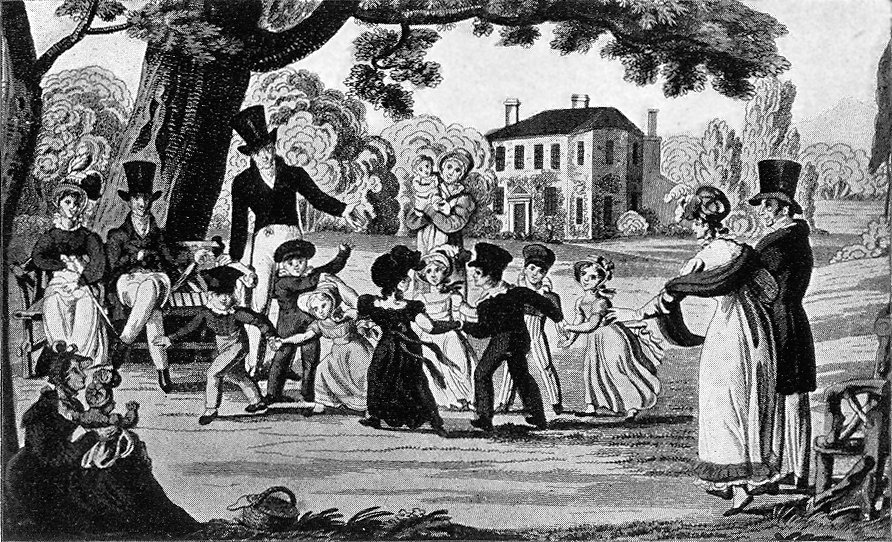
English children dancing, early 1820s

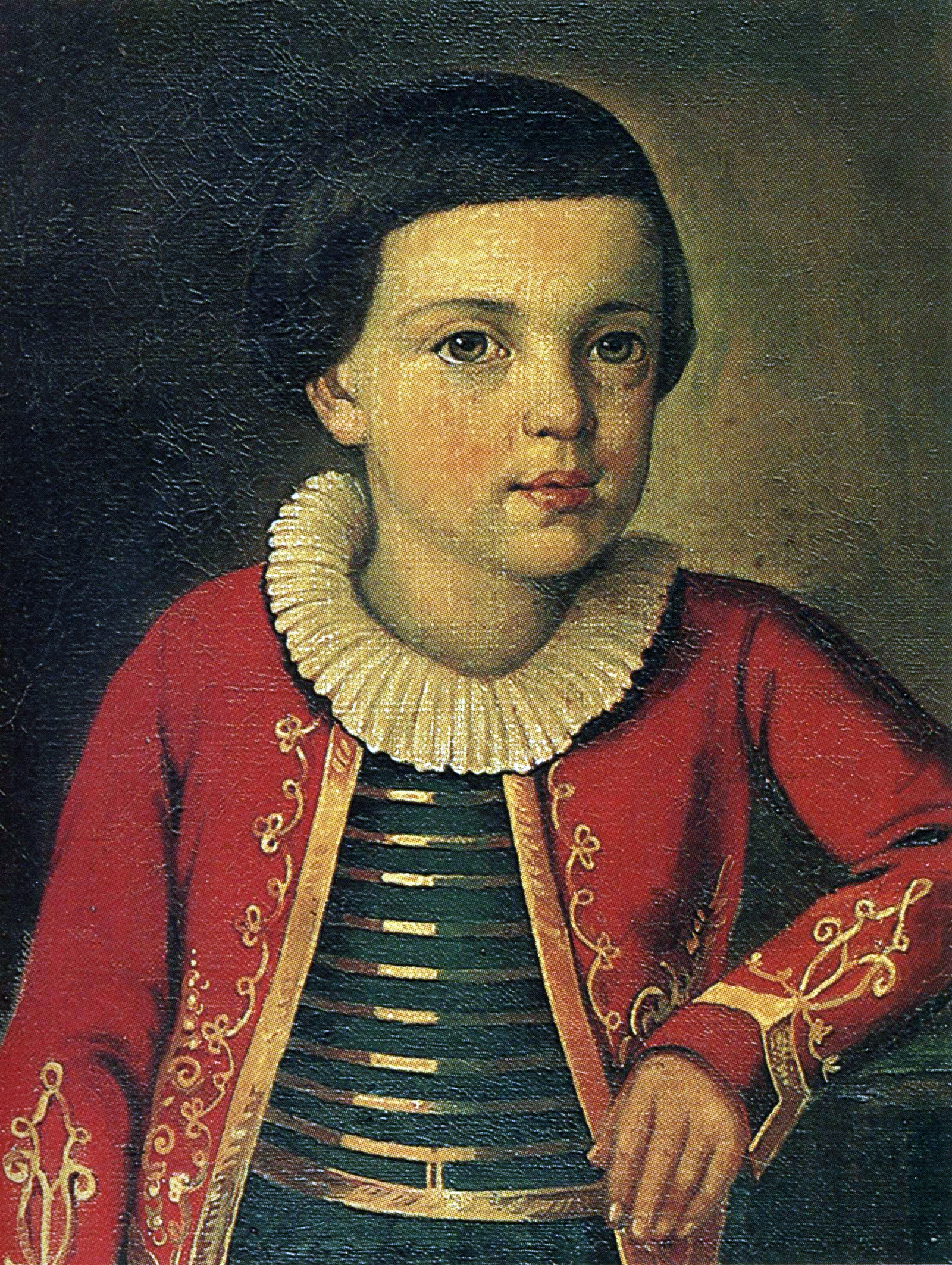
Mikhail Lermontov, Russia, 1820

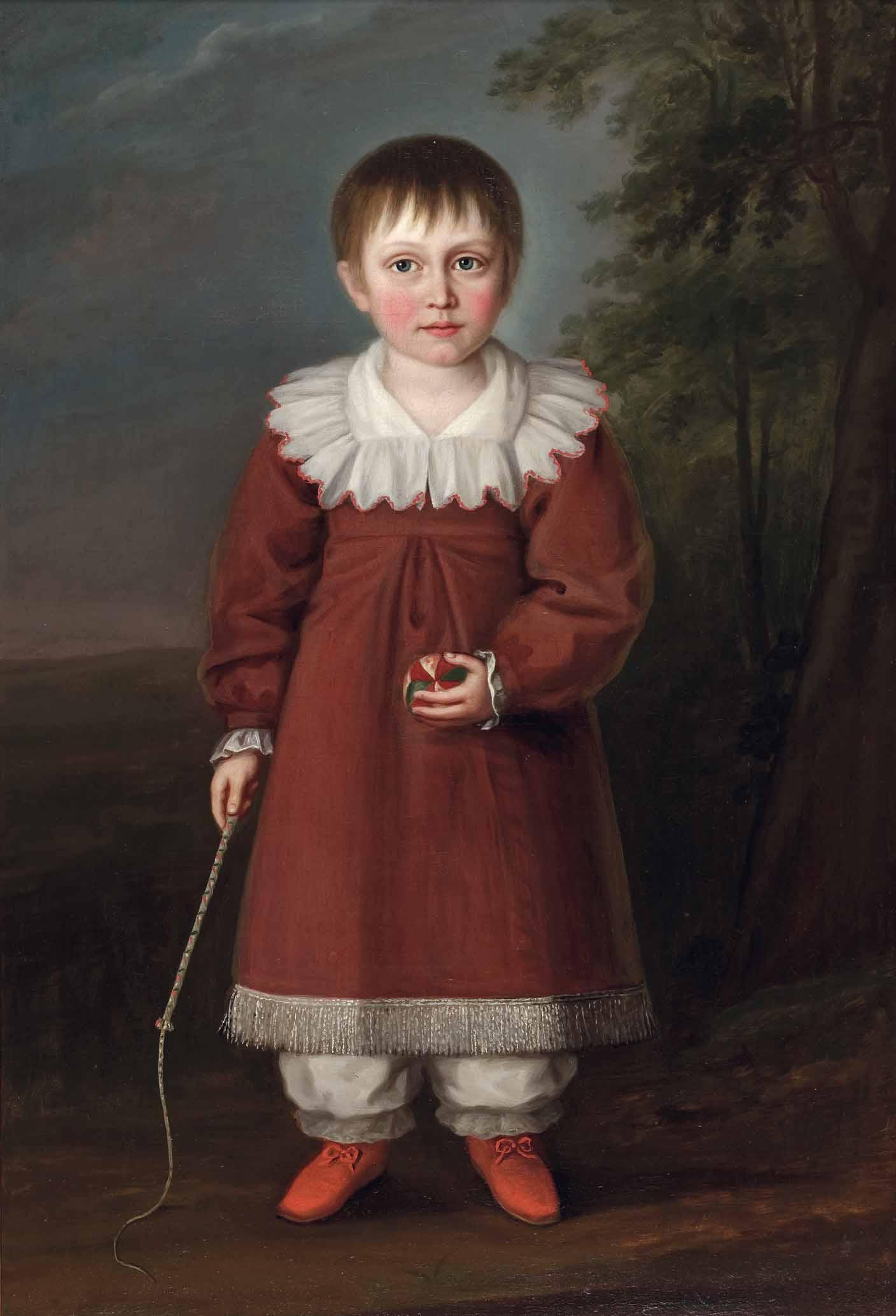
Young boy's dress, Berlin, c. 1820

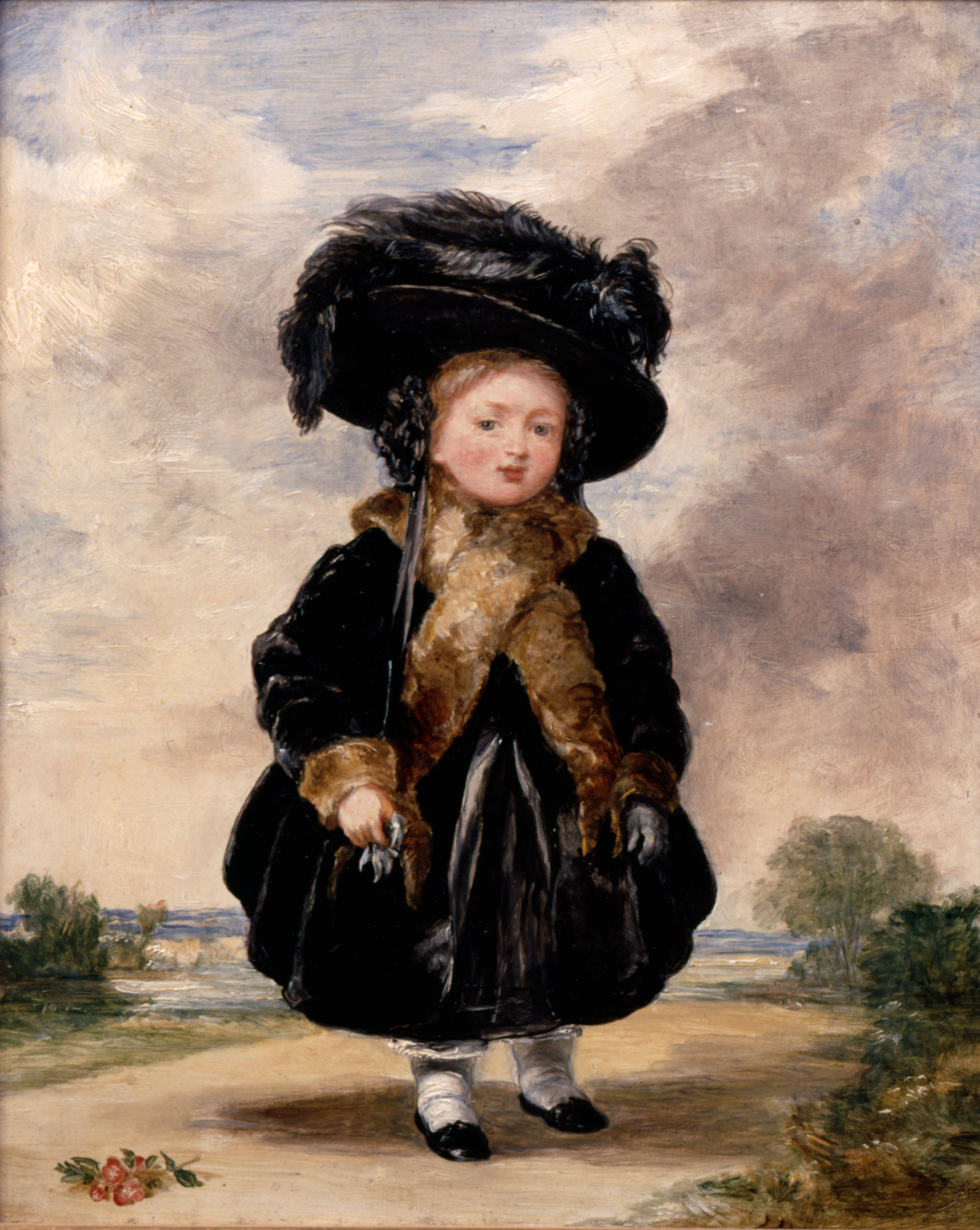
Princess Victoria of Kent, 1823

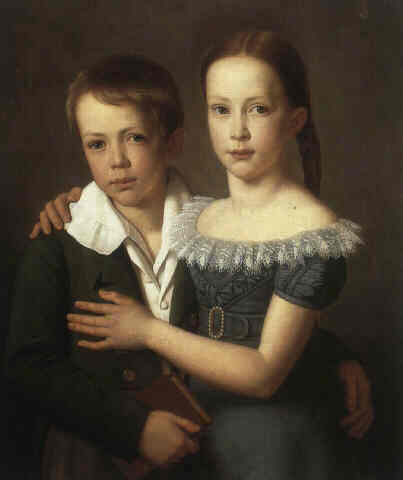
Portrait of Alwine and Robert Uellenberg by Heinrich Christoph Kolbe, Germany, 1825

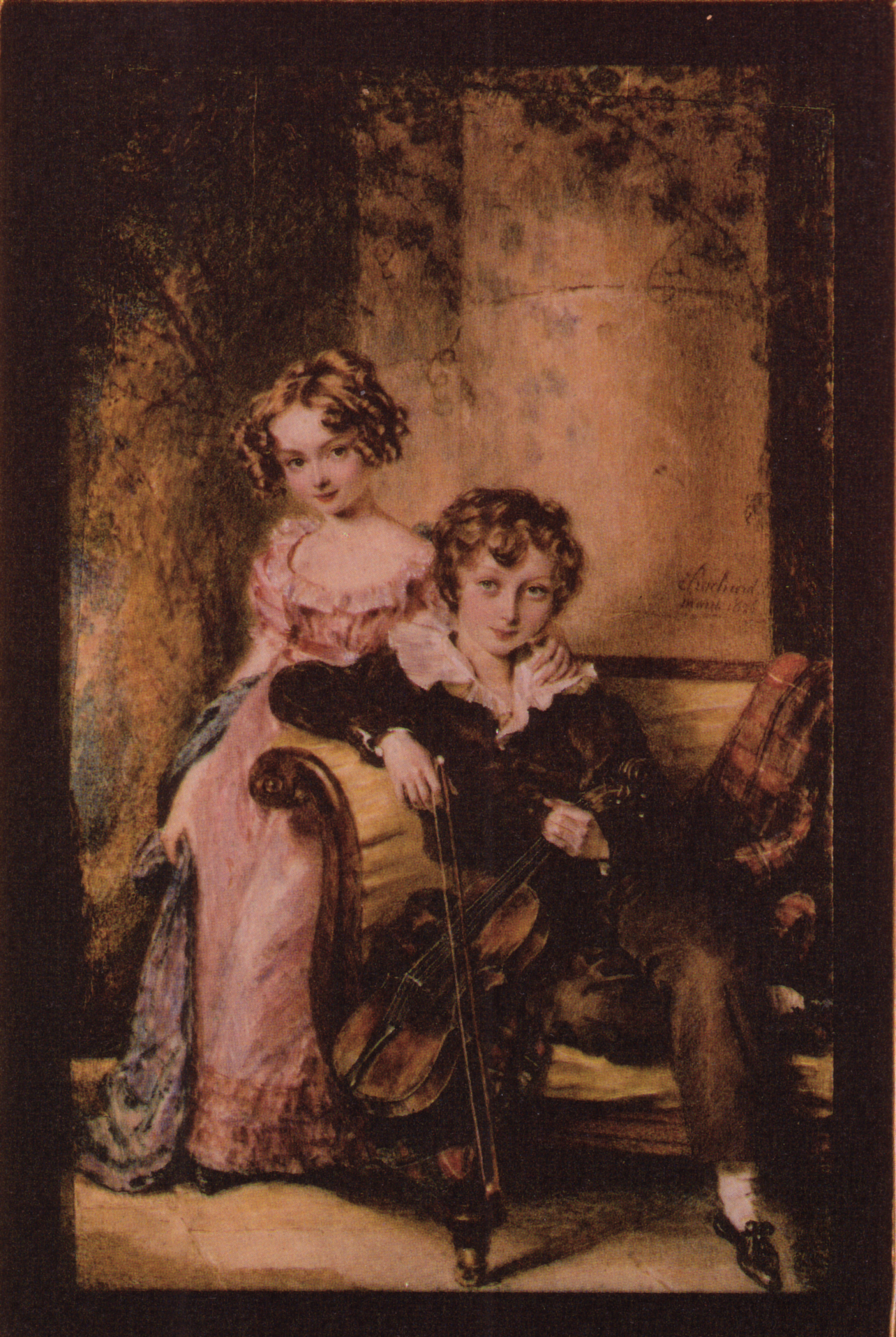
United Kingdom, 1826

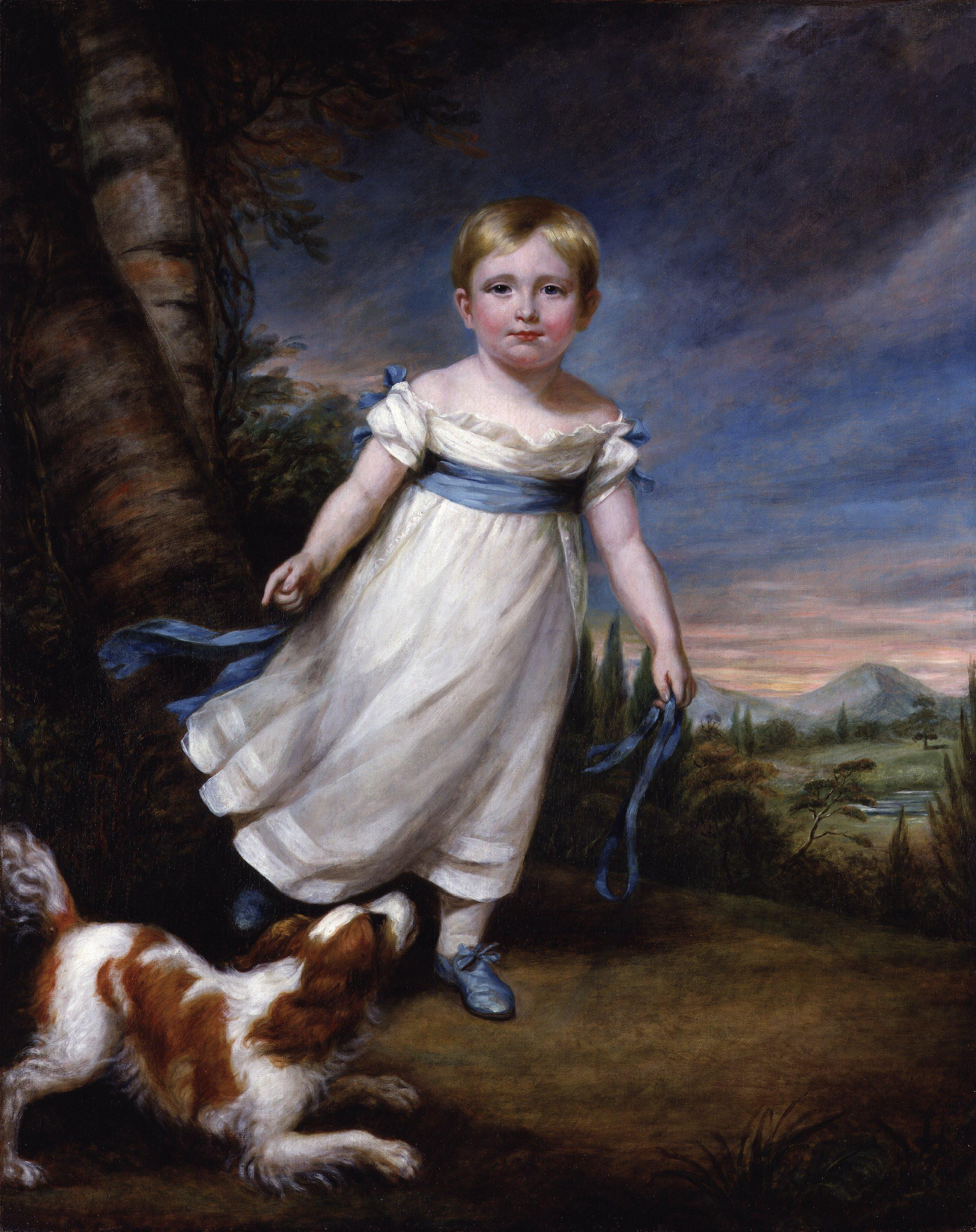
Portrait of John Ruskin by James Northcote, 1822

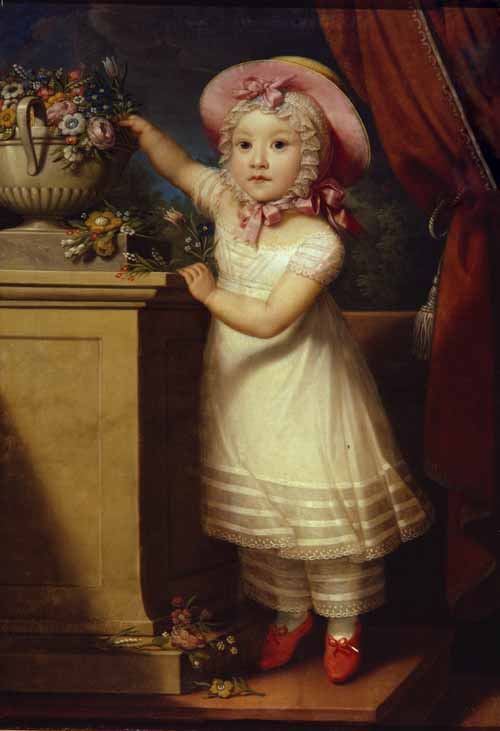
Ekaterina Dmitrievena Obreskova, ca 1824

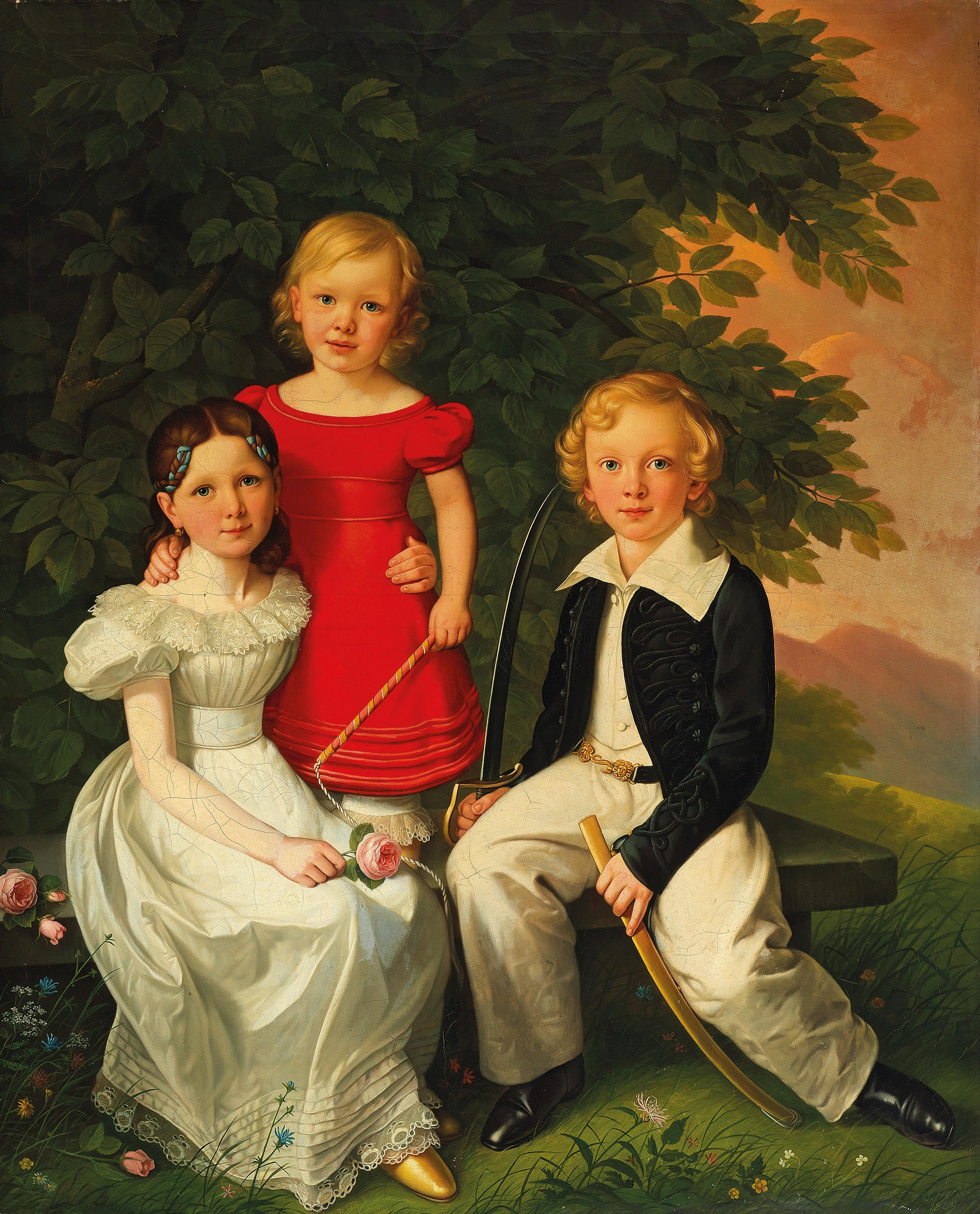
German children from the Rohde family, 1829
