= East Midlands =

Region of England

- Region
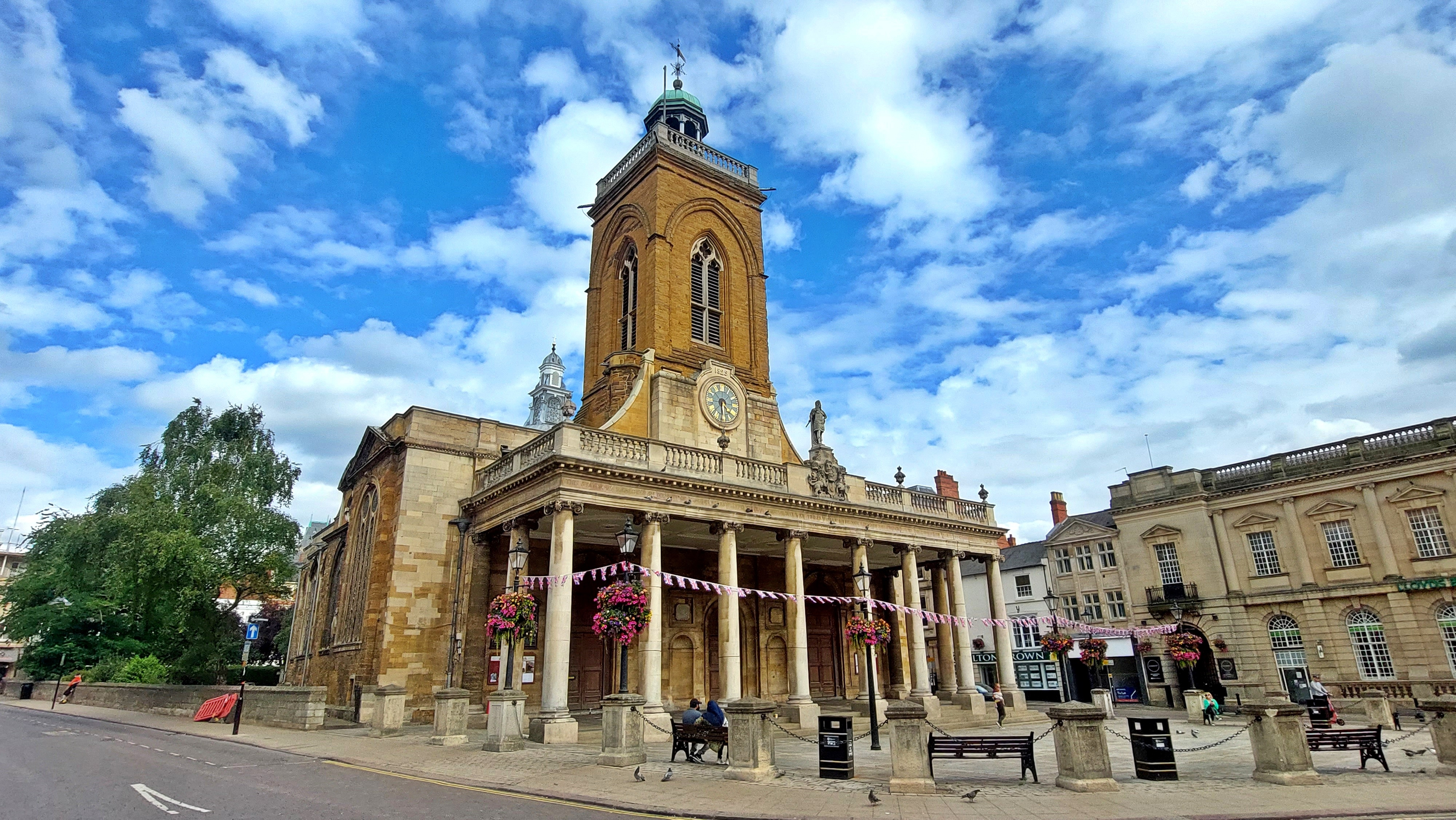
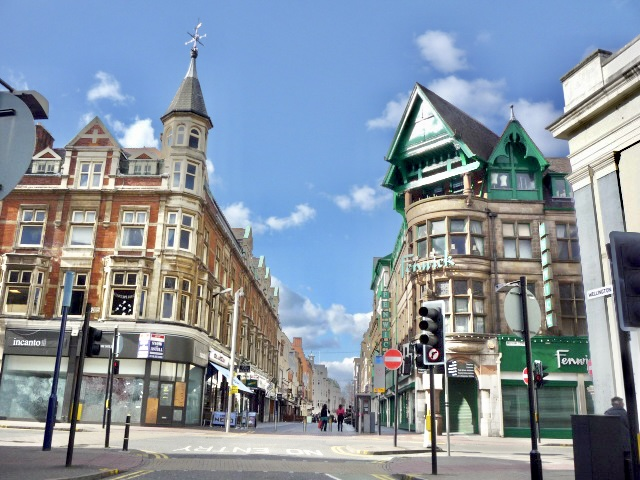
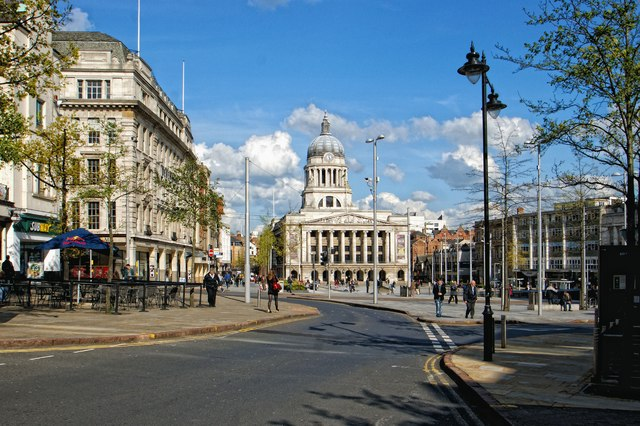
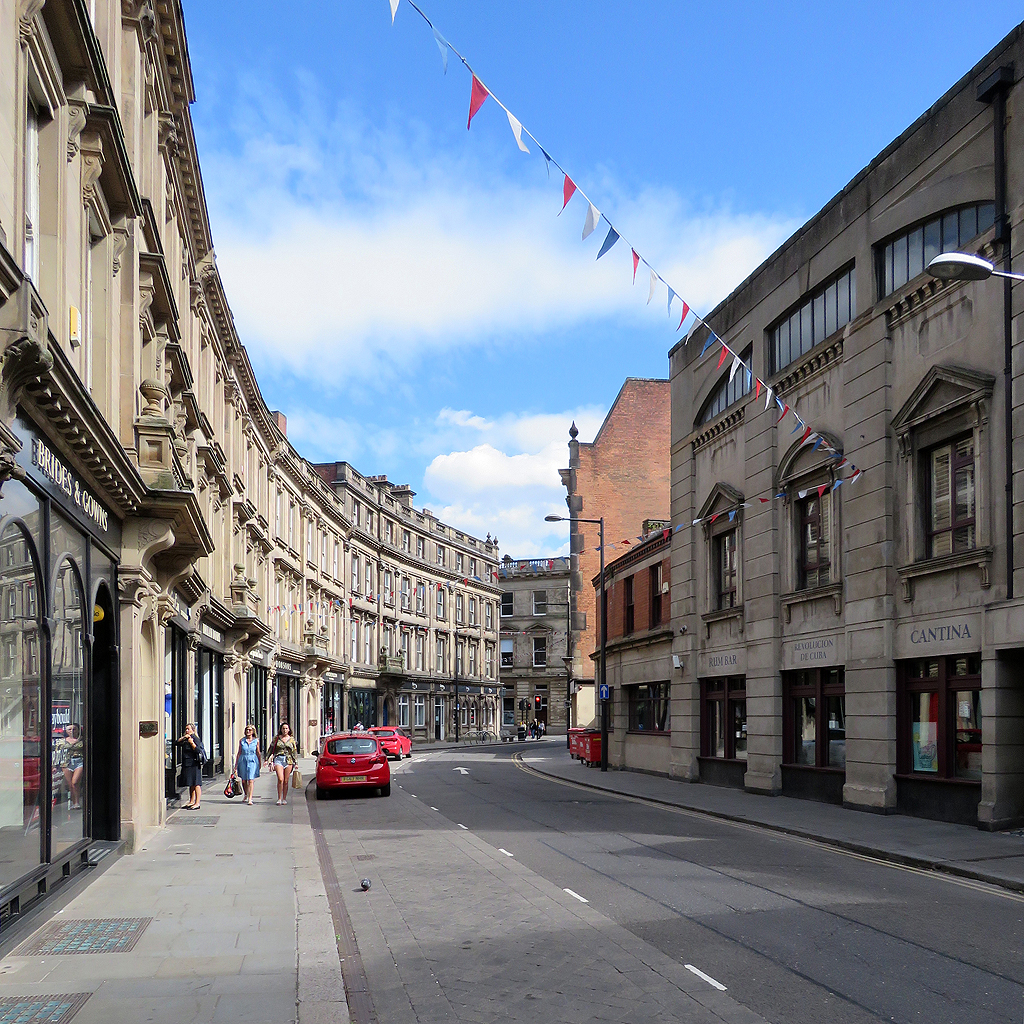
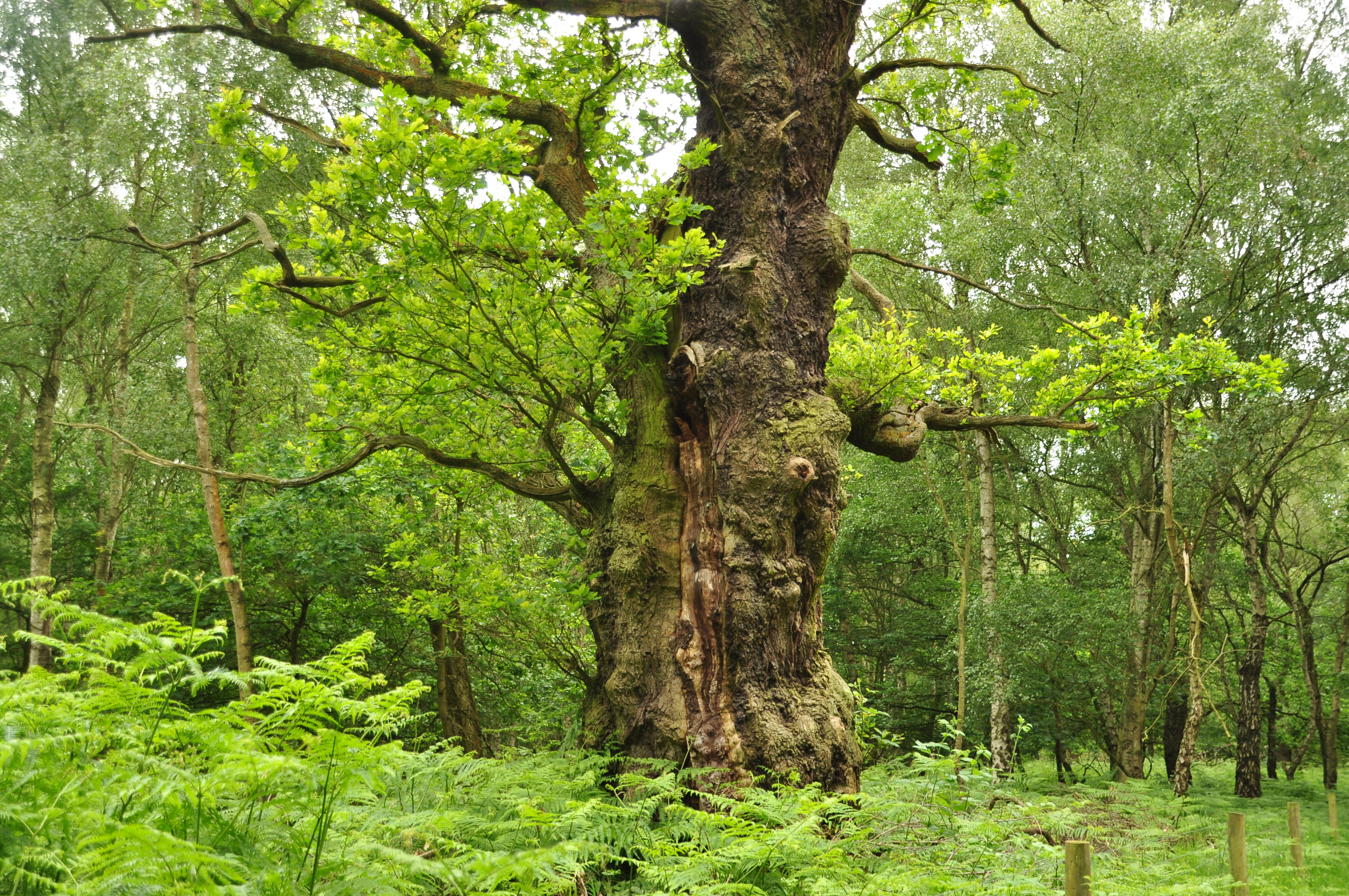
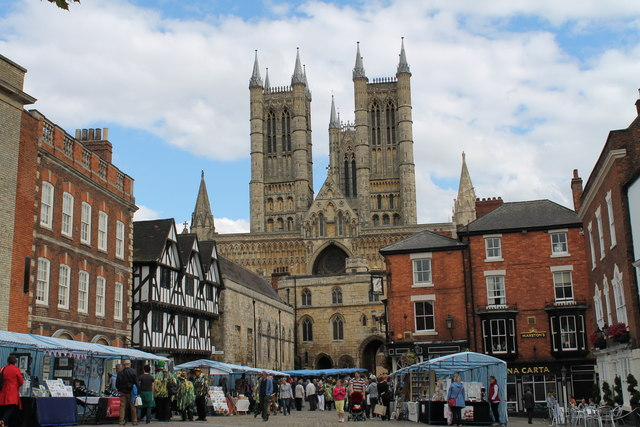
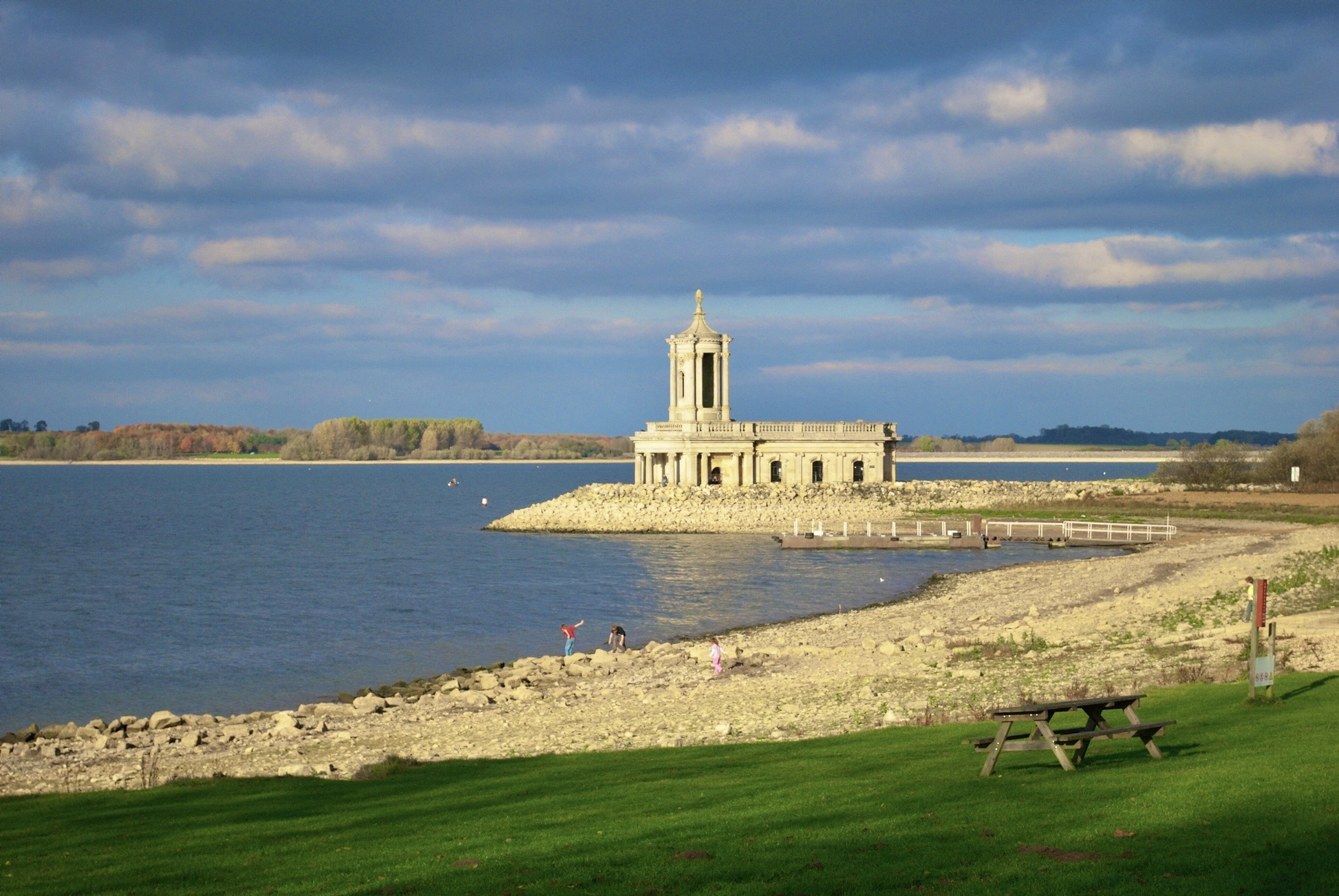
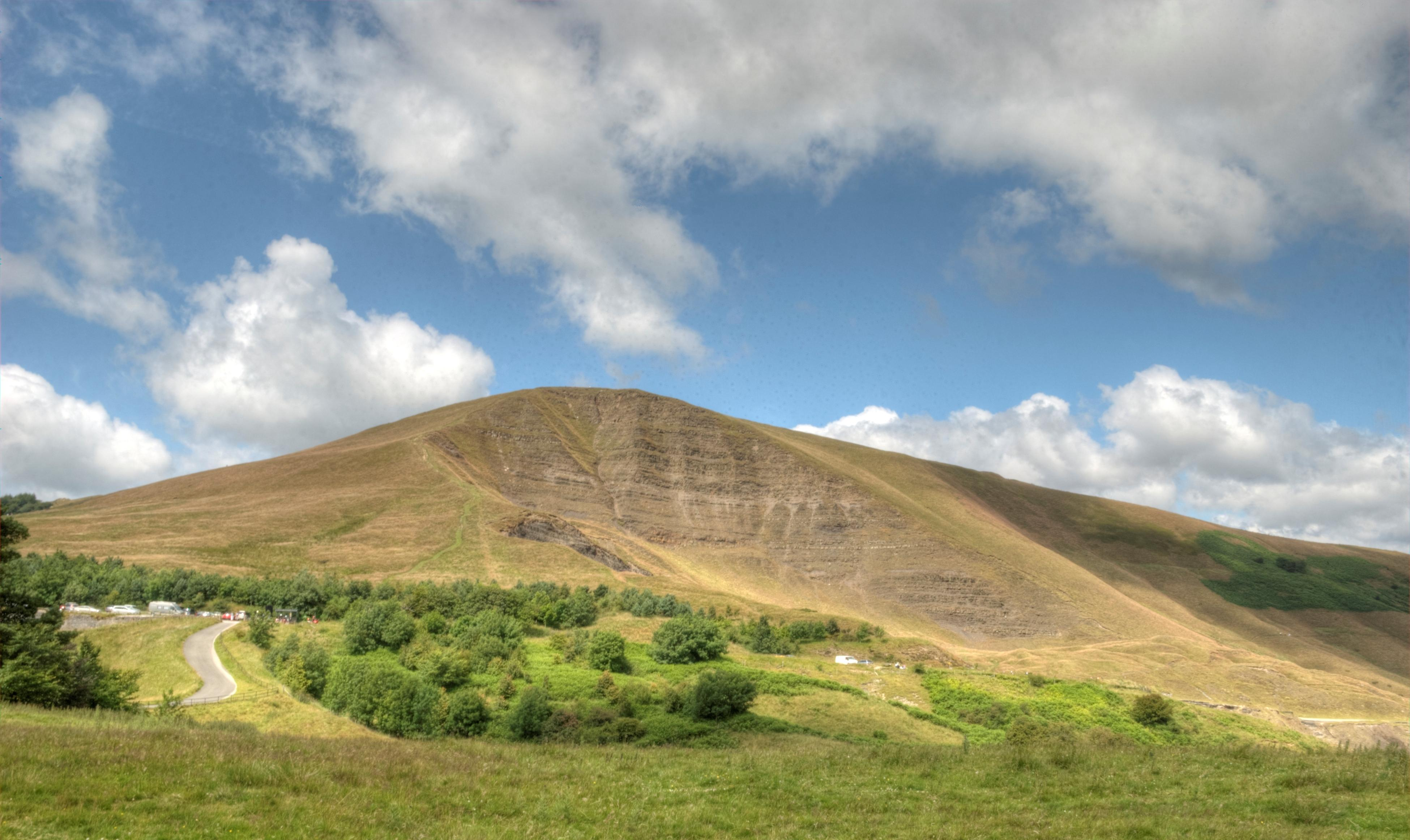
- From top, left to right: Northampton; Leicester; Nottingham; Derby; Sherwood Forest; Lincoln Cathedral; Rutland Water; Peak District

- East Midlands shown within England
- Coordinates: 52.98°N 0.75°W
- Sovereign state: United Kingdom
- Country: England
- GO established: 1994
- RDA established: 1998
- GO abolished: 2011
- RDA abolished: 31 March 2012
- Subdivisions: 6 counties: Derbyshire; Leicestershire; Lincolnshire (part); Northamptonshire; Nottinghamshire; Rutland; 2 combined authority: East Midlands; Greater Lincolnshire CCA (part); 35 districts: 6 unitary; 29 non-metropolitan in 4 non-metropolitan counties

Government
  - Type: Local authority leaders' board
  - Body: East Midlands Councils
  - MPs: 47 MPs (of 650)

Area
  - Total: 6,105 sq mi (15,811 km^{2})
  - Land: 6,032 sq mi (15,623 km^{2})
  - Rank: 4th

Population (2025)
  - Total: 5,085,641
  - Rank: 8th
  - Density: 840/sq mi (326/km^{2})

Ethnicity (2021)
  - Ethnic groups: List: 85.7% White; 8.0% Asian; 2.7% Black; 2.4% Mixed; 1.3% other

Religion (2021)
  - Religion: List: 45.4% Christianity; 40.0% no religion; 4.3% Islam; 2.5% Hinduism; 1.1% Sikhism; 0.3% Buddhism; 0.1% Judaism; 0.5% other; 5.9% not stated
- Time zone: UTC+0 (GMT)
  - Summer (DST): UTC+1 (BST)
- ITL code: TLF
- GSS code: E12000004

The East Midlands is one of nine official regions of England. It comprises the eastern half of the area traditionally known as the Midlands. It consists of Derbyshire, Leicestershire, Lincolnshire (except for North Lincolnshire and North East Lincolnshire), Northamptonshire, Nottinghamshire, and Rutland. The region has a land area of 15,623 km^{2} (6,032 sq mi), with an estimated population 5,085,641 in 2025. With a sufficiency-level world city ranking, Nottingham is the only settlement in the region to be classified by the Globalization and World Cities Research Network.

The main cities in the region are Derby, Leicester, Lincoln and Nottingham. The largest towns in these counties are Boston, Chesterfield, Coalville, Corby, Glossop, Grantham, Kettering, Loughborough, Newark-on-Trent, Northampton, Mansfield, Oakham, Swadlincote and Wellingborough.

== Physical features ==
The highest point at 636 m (2,087 ft) is Kinder Scout, in the Peak District of the southern Pennines in northwest Derbyshire near Glossop. Other hilly areas of 95 to 280 m (312 to 919 ft) in altitude, together with lakes and reservoirs, rise in and around the Charnwood Forest north of Leicester, and in the Lincolnshire Wolds.

The region's major rivers, the Nene, the Soar, the Trent, and the Welland, flow in a northeasterly direction towards the Humber and the Wash. The Derwent, conversely, rises in the High Peak before flowing south to join the Trent some 2 miles (3 km) before its conflux with the Soar, and the Witham flows in an arch, first north to Lincoln before heading south to the Wash.

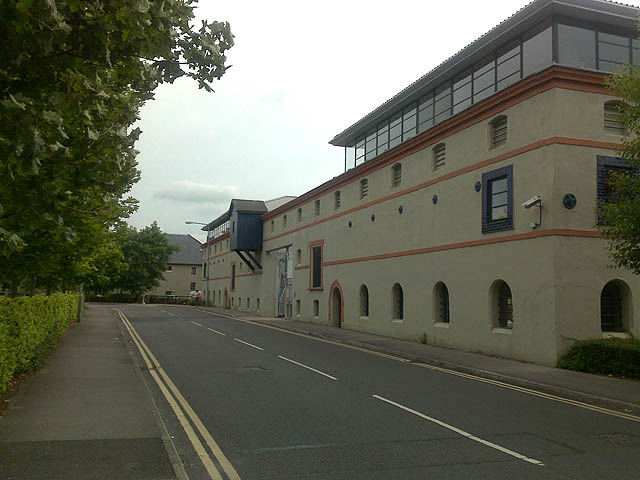
Royal Society of Wildlife Trusts, next to the Trent, and Waitrose, in Newark-on-Trent

The centre of the East Midlands area lies roughly between Bingham, Nottinghamshire and Bottesford, Leicestershire. The geographical centre of England lies in Higham on the Hill in west Leicestershire, close to the boundary between Leicestershire and Warwickshire. Some 88 per cent of the land is rural in character, although agriculture accounts for less than three per cent of the region's jobs.

Church Flatts Farm in Coton in the Elms, South Derbyshire, is the furthest place from the sea in the UK (70 miles; 110 km). In April 1936 the first Ordnance Survey trig point was sited at Cold Ashby in Northamptonshire. The Royal Society of Wildlife Trusts and The Wildlife Trusts are based next to the River Trent and Newark Castle railway station. The National Centre for Earth Observation is at the University of Leicester.

=== Geology ===
The region is home to large quantities of limestone, and the East Midlands Oil Province. Charnwood Forest is noted for its abundant levels of volcanic rock, estimated to be approximately 600 million years old.

A quarter of the UK's cement is manufactured in the region, at three sites in Hope and Tunstead in Derbyshire, and Ketton Cement Works in Rutland. Of the aggregates produced in the region, 25 per cent are from Derbyshire and four per cent from Leicestershire. Lincolnshire and Nottinghamshire each produce around 30 per cent of the region's sand and gravel output.

Barwell in Leicestershire was the site of Britain's largest meteorite (7 kg; 15 lb) on 24 December 1965. The 2008 Lincolnshire earthquake was 5.2 in magnitude.

=== Environment ===
Areas of the East Midlands designated by the East Midlands Biodiversity Partnership as Biodiversity Conservation Areas include:

- Charnwood Forest
- Coversand Heaths
- Derbyshire Peak Fringe and Lower Derwent
- Humberhead Levels
- Leighland Forest
- The Lincolnshire Limewoods and Heaths
- The Lincolnshire coast
- The Peak District
- Rockingham Forest
- Sherwood Forest
- Rutland, SW Lincolnshire and N Northamptonshire
- The Wash

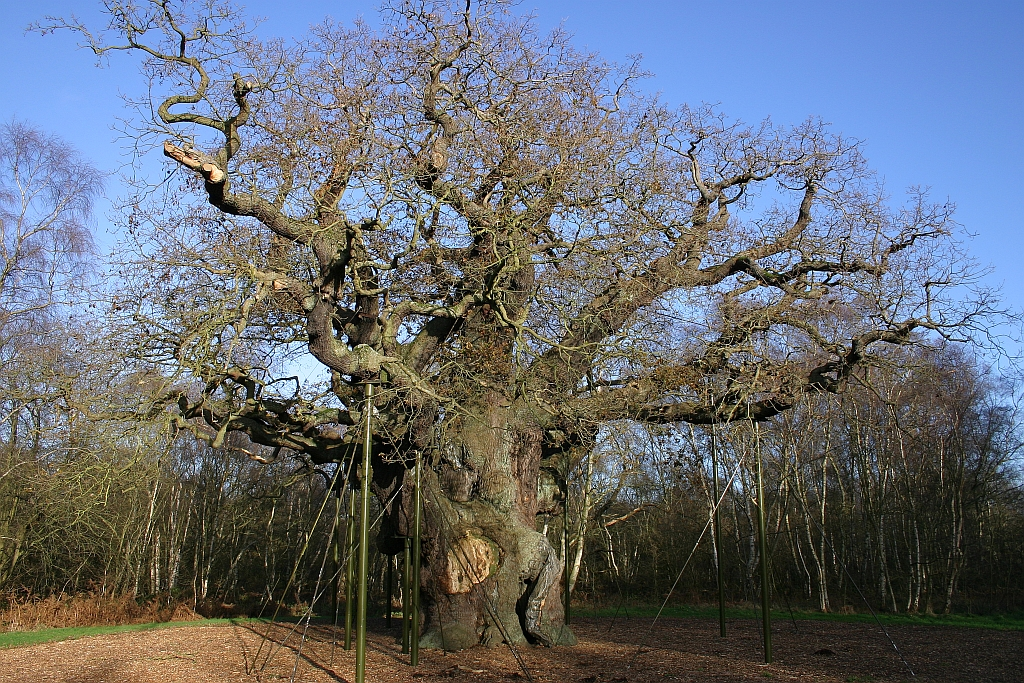
Major Oak in Sherwood Forest, a traditional landmark of the north-east Midlands

Areas of the East Midlands designated by the East Midlands Biodiversity Partnership as Biodiversity Enhancement Areas include:

- The Coalfields
- The Daventry Grasslands
- The Fens
- The Lincolnshire Coastal Grazing Marshes
- The Lincolnshire Wolds
- The National Forest
- The Yardley-Whittlewood Ridge

Two of the nationally designated Areas of Outstanding Natural Beauty are:

- The Peak District
- The Lincolnshire Wolds

=== Forestry ===
Several towns in the southern part of the region, including Market Harborough, Desborough, Rothwell, Corby, Kettering, Thrapston, Oundle and Stamford, lie within the boundaries of what was once Rockingham Forest – designated a royal forest by William the Conqueror and was long hunted by English kings and queens.

The National Forest is an environmental project in central England run by The National Forest Company. Areas of north Leicestershire, south Derbyshire and south-east Staffordshire covering around 200 square miles (520 km^{2}; 52,000 ha) are being planted in an attempt to blend ancient woodland with new plantings. It stretches from the western outskirts of Leicester in the east to Burton upon Trent in the west, and is planned to link the ancient forests of Needwood and Charnwood.

Sherwood Forest in Nottinghamshire attracts many visitors, and is perhaps best known for its ties with the legend of Robin Hood.

== Governance ==
Regional financial funding decisions for the East Midlands are taken by East Midlands Councils, based in Melton Mowbray. East Midlands Councils is an unelected body made up of representatives of local government in the region. The defunct East Midlands Development Agency was headquartered next to the BBC's East Midlands office in Nottingham and made financial decisions regarding economic development in the region. Since the Conservative-Liberal Democrat coalition government launched its austerity programme after the 2010 general election, regional bodies such as those have been devolved to smaller groups on a county level. As a region, there is no overriding body with significant financial or planning powers for the East Midlands.

The East Midlands Combined Authority was established in 2024.

== Urban areas ==
The East Midlands region contains many urban areas which include:

- Nottingham Urban Area (includes the Derbyshire towns of Alfreton, Belper, Heanor, Ilkeston, Long Eaton, Ripley and Sandiacre. It also covers Nottingham, Mansfield, Arnold, Beeston, Bulwell, Carlton, Hucknall and West Bridgford. This means it spans parts of both Derbyshire and Nottinghamshire.) (Pop: 729,977)
- Leicester Urban Area (Pop: 650,000)
- Derby Urban Area (Pop: 270,468)
- Mansfield Urban Area (Spanning Mansfield, Sutton-in-Ashfield and Kirkby-in-Ashfield) (Pop: 158,114)
- Lincoln Urban Area (Spanning Lincoln, North Hykeham and other villages) (Pop: 115,000)
- Burton upon Trent and Swadlincote Green Belt (Which although is not an urban area itself, it spans two counties between Staffordshire and Derbyshire near the towns of Burton-upon-Trent and Swadlincote to restrict building)

== Towns and cities ==
Major towns and cities in the East Midlands region include:

Bold indicates city status.

Population > 400,000

- **Leicester**, LEC

Population > 300,000

- **Nottingham**, NTT

Population > 200,000

- **Derby**, DBY
- Northampton, NTH

Population > 100,000

- **Lincoln**, LIN
- Mansfield, NTT

Population > 50,000

- Beeston, NTT
- Chesterfield, DBY
- Corby, NTH
- Hinckley, LEC
- Kettering, NTH
- Loughborough, LEC
- Wellingborough, NTH

Population > 25,000

- Arnold, NTT
- Boston, LIN
- Bulwell, NTT
- Coalville, LEC
- Daventry, NTH
- Glossop, DBY
- Grantham, LIN
- Hucknall, NTT
- Ilkeston, DBY
- Kirkby-in-Ashfield, NTT
- Long Eaton, DBY
- Market Harborough, LEC
- Melton Mowbray, LEC
- Newark-on-Trent, NTT
- Rushden, NTH
- Spalding, LIN
- Sutton-in-Ashfield, NTT
- Swadlincote, DBY
- West Bridgford, NTT
- Wigston, LEC
- Worksop, NTT

Population > 10,000

- Ashby de la Zouch, LEC
- Belper, DBY
- Bingham, NTT
- Bolsover, DBY
- Bourne, LIN
- Brackley, NTH
- Buxton, DBY
- Desborough, NTH
- Dronfield, DBY
- Earl Shilton, LEC
- Eastwood, NTT
- Eckington, DBY
- Gainsborough, LIN
- Heanor, DBY
- Louth, LIN
- Lutterworth, LEC
- Mablethorpe, LIN
- Mansfield Woodhouse, NTT
- New Mills, DBY
- North Hykeham, LIN
- Oadby, LEC
- Oakham, RUT
- Retford, NTT
- Ripley, DBY
- Shepshed, LEC
- Skegness, LIN
- Sleaford, LIN
- Stamford, LIN
- Stapleford, NTT
- Staveley, DBY
- Syston, LEC
- Towcester, NTH

== Transport ==
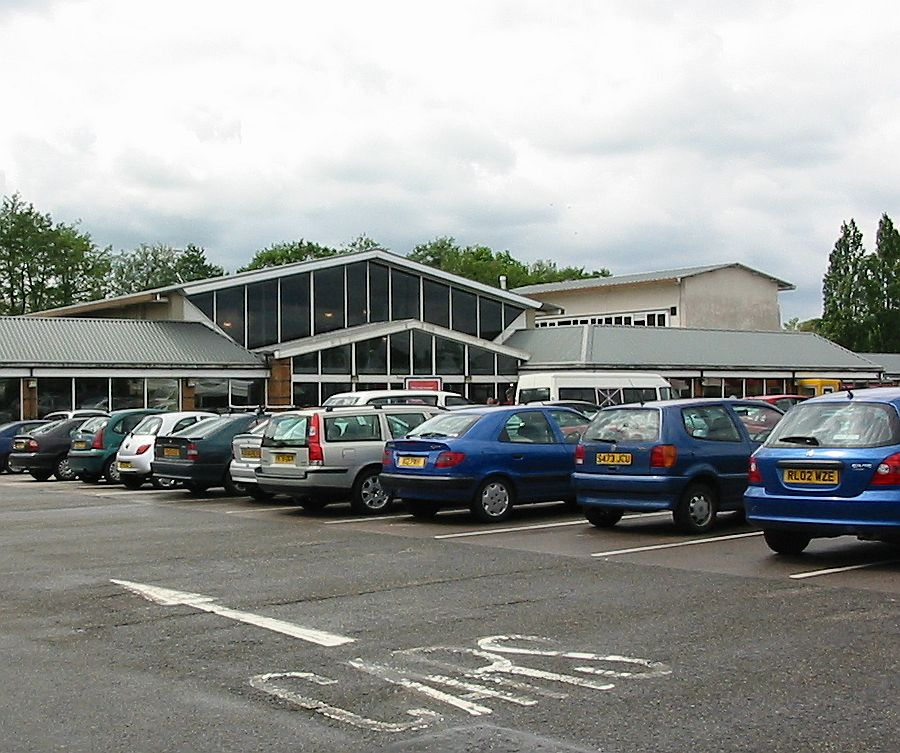
Watford Gap services, Britain's first motorway service station, seen here in May 2006, which opened in November 1959

In total, 9% of all jobs in the region are in logistics. Traffic in the region is growing at 2% per year – the highest growth rate of all UK regions. It is estimated that about 140,000 heavy goods vehicle journeys are made inside the region each day.

=== Road ===
The M1 (part of the E13 European route) serves the four largest urban areas in the region and affords a motorway link between London, Yorkshire, and North East England. Additionally, the M6 begins on the south-western edge of the region, providing links to the West Midlands and North West England. Both connect to other major routes providing further links to other parts of the UK.

To the east of the largest cities lies the A1 (part of the European route E15), which is important for journeys to and from ports on England's north-east coast and the capital, and is a major artery for the United Kingdom's agricultural industry. The A46 largely follows the Fosse Way, which has linked the south-western and north-eastern parts of England since Roman times. The A43 dual carriageway connects the East Midlands via the M40 motorway corridor with the university city of Oxford, as well as South of England and Solent ports further afield. The historically important A5 runs along the south-west Leicestershire boundary to the south of Lutterworth and Hinckley. The A14 runs through the north of Northamptonshire, serving the settlements of Kettering and Corby alongside surrounding areas, and is a major route between the region and the East of England, including the university city of Cambridge, and the major port of Felixstowe.

=== Airports ===
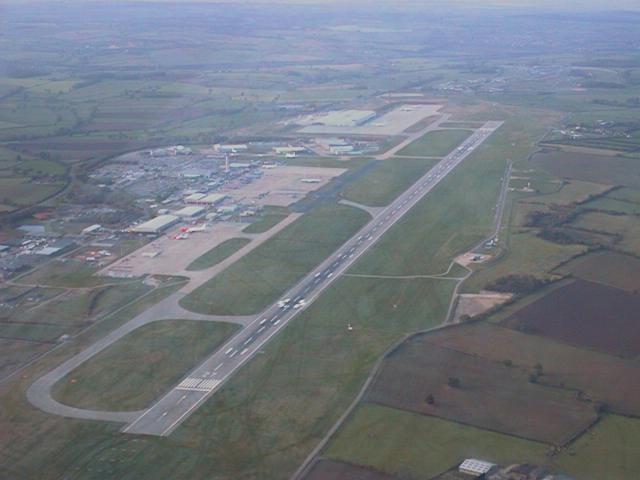
East Midlands Airport (looking west)

East Midlands Airport in North West Leicestershire is situated in proximity to the region's largest cities; 14 miles (23 km) from the centres of Derby and Nottingham, with central Leicester being 21 miles (34 km) away and Lincoln further north east being 43 miles (69 km) away. The airport is the region's biggest public airport, used by over 4 million passengers annually.

Rivalry between the region's three biggest cities has led to a long-running discussion about the identity of both the airport, and region, with the East Midlands rarely found on any non-political map of the UK. The name was at one point changed to Nottingham East Midlands Airport so as to include the name of the city that is supposedly most internationally recognisable. However, the airport has a Derby phone number and postcode, and is in Leicestershire, but is officially assigned to Nottingham by IATA. As a result of the dispute, the name change was reverted.

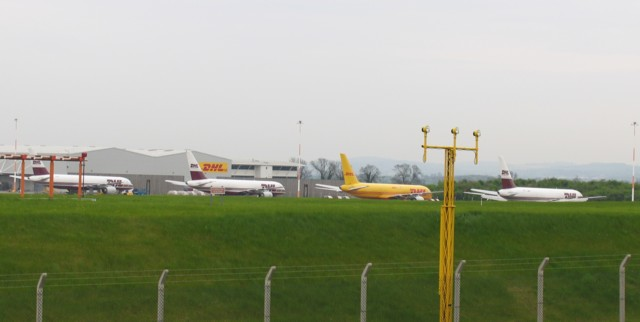
Air cargo aircraft at EMA

Three of the world's four main international air-freight companies (integrators) have their UK operations at EMA: DHL, UPS and TNT Express (TNT bought by UPS); FedEx have theirs at Stansted. It is the second-largest freight airport in the UK after Heathrow, but most freight from EMA is carried on dedicated planes, whereas most freight from Heathrow is carried on passenger planes (bellyhold). Royal Mail have their main airport hubs at Heathrow and EMA, as EMA is conveniently near the M1, A42 and A50. Heathrow takes some 60 per cent of UK air freight, and EMA some 10 per cent, with Stansted, Manchester and Gatwick next. Air freight has grown at EMA from 1994 to 2004 from about 10,000 to over 250,000 tonnes. The main hours of cargo flying are from 20:00–05:00; domestic cargo flies into the airport in the evening, then from 23:30 to 01:30 cargo flies to European capitals and from 03:00–05:00 from Europe to EMA. It is the UK's twelfth-largest passenger airport; the runway is the UK's sixth-longest at 2,900 metres (9,500 ft). Royal Mail flights from EMA go to Belfast, Edinburgh, Inverness, Aberdeen, Newcastle, Exeter and Bournemouth, and it is the largest UK Royal Mail air hub, with eleven flights per night. DHL is the main route carrier at EMA by far with 20 flights per night, UPS have 6, and TNT have 2 (Belfast and Liège); for hubs in Europe, DHL flies to Leipzig, UPS to Cologne, and TNT at Liège.

Smaller airports in the region include Retford Gamston Airport, Nottingham Airport, Leicester Airport, Hucknall Airfield, Sywell Aerodrome, Bruntingthorpe Aerodrome and Humberside Airport. Robin Hood Airport Doncaster Sheffield lies just outside the East Midlands in South Yorkshire.

=== Railway ===
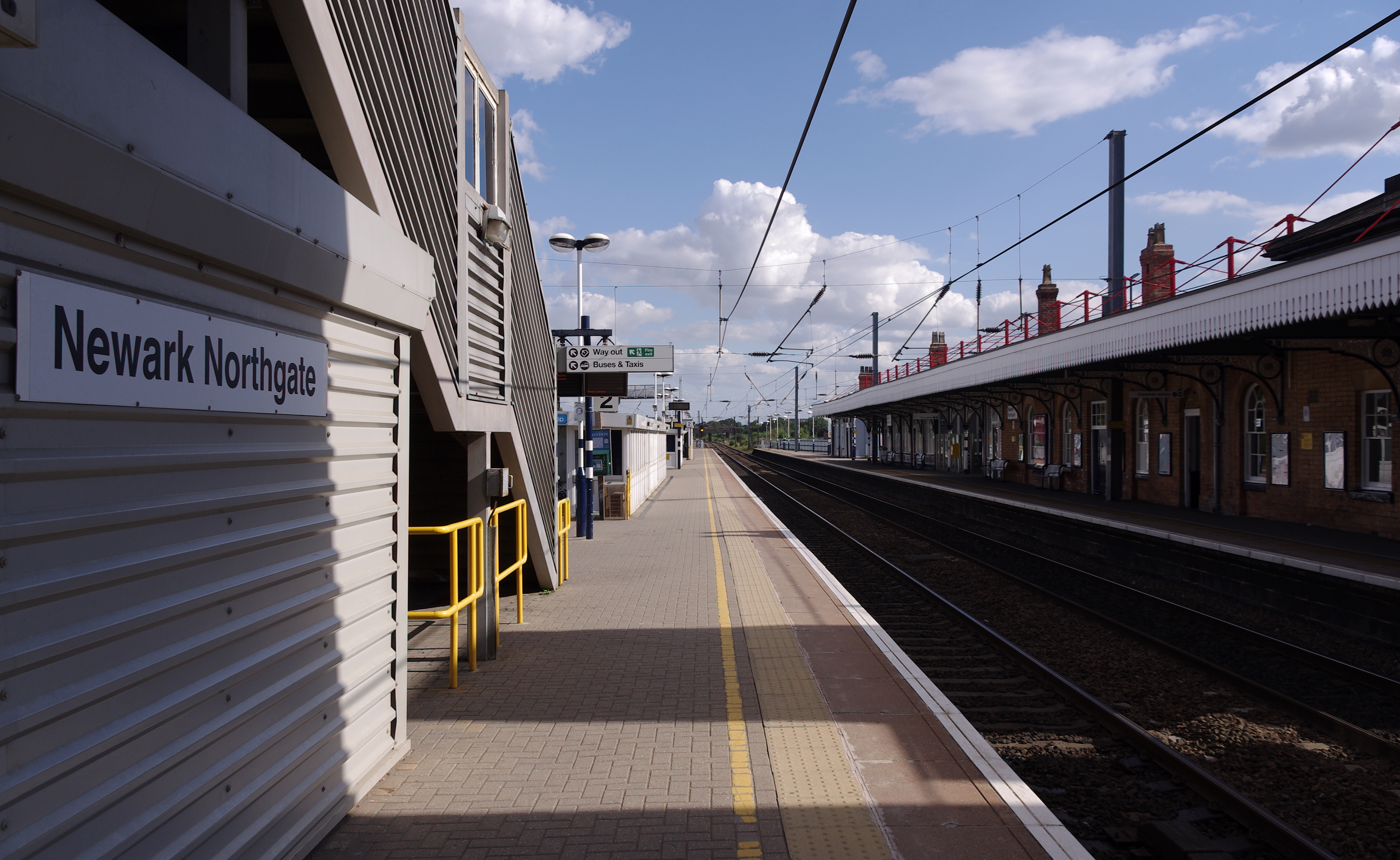
Newark North Gate railway station

Three of the United Kingdom's mainline railways serve the region: the Midland Main Line, the East Coast Main Line, and the West Coast Main Line (Northampton Loop) providing services terminating at London St Pancras, London King's Cross and London Euston respectively. The three lines provide regular high-speed services to London, at up to 125 mph (200 km/h), serving Wellingborough, Kettering, Corby, Market Harborough, Leicester, Loughborough, Derby, East Midlands Parkway, Nottingham, Chesterfield, Grantham, Newark North Gate and Retford. Northampton and Long Buckby are served by the Northampton Loop of the West Coast Main Line. England's primary south-west to north-east Cross Country Route runs through Derby and Chesterfield. Worksop, Mansfield, Lincoln, Matlock, Melton Mowbray, Skegness, Boston, Spalding and Oakham are served by regional services The Chiltern Main Line also serves the western fringe of the region, at Kings's Sutton.

A land speed record for trains was broken in the region. Although the record was set in 1938, the current world speed record for steam trains is held by 4468 Mallard, which clocked 126 mph (203 km/h) between Grantham and Peterborough, pulling six coaches on the East Coast Main Line near Little Bytham in Lincolnshire, on 3 July 1938. The Mallard record was unbroken by any British rail train until 6 June 1973, when an InterCity 125 between Northallerton and Thirsk reached 131 mph (211 km/h). Mallard in 1938 had six carriages and a dynamometer car. The national electric-train speed record (pre-High Speed 1) of 162 mph (261 km/h) was set on the same stretch as the Mallard record, on 17 September 1989 by Class 91 91010.

There were plans to bring a new high-speed rail line through the East Midlands as part of the High Speed 2 project, of which Phase 2 would have brought a new line connecting Birmingham to Leeds, with a proposed station in Toton known as the East Midlands Hub It would also have served the region via "classic-compatible" tracks serving Chesterfield and Sheffield, the latter of which is just outside the region in Yorkshire & the Humber.

=== Water ===
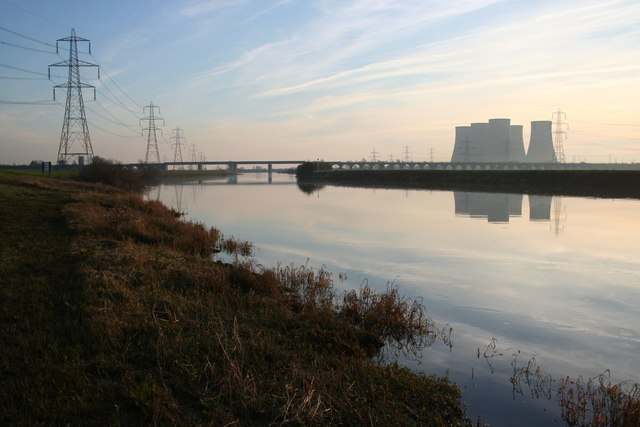
The River Trent at the former High Marnham Power Station, next to the 1897 Fledborough Viaduct; the power station, built in 1959, was Europe's first 1000 MW coal power station (5 x 200 MW) and consumed coal from 17 collieries; the area is the largest collection of power stations in Europe, sometimes known as Kilowatt Valley.

The Trent is a navigable river used to transport goods to the Humber, as well as passing by many power stations. The Trent is the only river in England able to supply cooling water for power stations for most of its length; it has the largest water capacity in England, although it is not the longest.

Several rivers in the region gave their name to early Rolls-Royce jet engines, namely the Nene, the Welland, and the Soar.

=== Trams ===
Nottingham is the only city in the region served by a light railway system, operated by Nottingham Express Transit.

=== Transport policy ===
As part of the transport planning system, the later defunct Regional Assembly was under statutory requirement to produce a Regional Transport Strategy to provide long term planning for transport in the region. This involved region wide transport schemes such as those carried out by the Highways Agency and Network Rail.

Local transport authorities in the region carry out planning through a Local transport plan (LTP). The most recent LTPs are for the period 2006–11. The following East Midland transport authorities published an LTP online: Derbyshire, Leicestershire. Lincolnshire, Northamptonshire, Nottinghamshire and Rutland U.A. The unitary authorities of Derby, Leicester and Nottingham They have each written a joint LTP in collaboration with their respective local county councils.

== History ==
=== Romans ===
A historical basis for such a region exists in the territory of the Corieltauvi tribe. When the Romans took control, they made Leicester (Ratae Corieltauvorum) one of their main forts. The main town in the region in Roman times was Lincoln, at the confluence of the Fosse Way and Ermine Street.

The Five Boroughs of the Danelaw

=== Anglo-Saxons and the Danelaw ===
After the withdrawal of the Romans, the area was settled by Angles, a Germanic people who gave the East Midlands most of the place-names it has today. They eventually founded the Kingdom of Mercia, meaning "borderlands," as it borders the Welsh people to the west. The region also corresponds to the later Five Boroughs of the Danelaw, the area that Vikings from Denmark controlled. In about 917 the region was subdivided between Danelaw (Vikings) to the north, and Mercia (Anglo-Saxons) to the south. By 920 this border had moved north to the River Humber. Evidence of the Danelaw can be seen in place-name endings of the region's villages, particularly towards the east. The Danes under Canute recaptured the area between about 1016 and 1035, but it came back under English control after Canute's death that same year.

=== Civil War ===
The region's two main battles in the English Civil War were the Battle of Naseby in northern Northamptonshire on 14 June 1645, and the Battle of Winceby on 11 October 1643 in eastern Lincolnshire.

=== Scientific heritage ===
Isaac Newton, born in Grantham in 1642, is perhaps the most prolific scientist. His accomplishments include calculus, Newton's laws of motion, and Newton's law of universal gravitation, among many others. There is a shopping centre named in his honour in Grantham. Thomas Simpson from Leicestershire is known for Simpson's rule. Roger Cotes invented the concept of the radian in 1714, but the term was not named until 1873.

George Green (1793 – 1841), born in Sneinton, Nottingham was a mathematical physicist best known for the vector calculus theorem and the functions that bear his name.

Henry Cavendish, loosely connected with Derbyshire, discovered hydrogen in 1766 (although the element's name came from Antoine Lavoisier), and Cavendish was the first to estimate an accurate mass of the Earth in 1798 in his Cavendish experiment. The Cavendish Laboratory at the University of Cambridge is named after a relative. Herbert Spencer coined the term "survival of the fittest" in 1864, which was once strongly linked with social Darwinism. Sir John Flamsteed was the first Astronomer Royal of the Royal Observatory, Greenwich in 1675. Robert Bakewell, of Dishley in Leicestershire and known for his English Leicester sheep, arrived at selective breeding; his English Longhorns were the first cattle bred for beef.

George Boole, pioneer of Boolean logic (upon which all digital electronics and computers depend), was born in Lincoln in 1815. The application of Boole's theory to digital circuit design would come in 1937 by Claude Shannon. Boole's grandson, the physicist G. I. Taylor, made significant experimental contributions to quantum mechanics. The first practical demonstration of radar was near Daventry in 1935. Robert Robinson, of Chesterfield in Derbyshire, invented the circular symbol in 1925 for the pi bonds of the benzene ring, as found on structural diagrams of aromatic compounds. Nicola Pellow, a maths undergraduate at Leicester Polytechnic, whilst at CERN in November 1990, wrote the world's second web browser.

Silicone was discovered in 1899 by Prof Frederic Kipping at University College, Nottingham. Michael Creeth of Northampton discovered the hydrogen-bonding mechanism between DNA bases, allowing the structure of DNA to be discovered. Nottinghamshire's Ken Richardson was in charge of the team at Pfizer in Sandwich, Kent that in 1981 discovered Fluconazole (Diflucan), the world's leading antifungal medication, especially useful for those with weakened immune systems. It has few side effects. Richardson is one of the few Britons in the National Inventors Hall of Fame. Don Grierson at the University of Nottingham was the first to produce a Genetically modified tomato, which became the first GM food on sale in the UK and in the United States.

Louis Essen, a Nottingham physicist, made advances in the quartz clock in the 1930s at the National Physical Laboratory in Teddington, to produce the quartz ring clock in 1938, and the caesium clock, known as the atomic clock, in 1955. During the war he invented the cavity resonance wavemeter to find the first accurate value of the speed of light. The atomic clock works on differences in magnetic spin. Before Essen's invention, the second was defined in terms of the orbit of the Earth round the Sun; he changed it in 1967 to be based on the hyperfine structure of the caesium-133 atom. Coordinated Universal Time (UTC), in Paris, takes the average of 300 atomic clocks around the world.

On the early morning of Tuesday 26 February 1935 the radio transmitter at Daventry was used for the "Daventry Experiment" which involved the first practical demonstration of radar, by its inventor Robert Watson-Watt and Arnold Frederic Wilkins. They used a radio receiver installed in a van at Litchborough (just off the A5 about 6 miles (9.7 km) south of Daventry) to receive signals bounced off a metal-clad Handley Page Heyford bomber flying across the radio transmissions. The interference picked up from the aircraft allowed its approximate navigational position to be estimated, and therefore proved that it was possible to detect the position of aircraft using radio waves. The success of the experiment persuaded the British government to fund the development of a network of full scale radar stations on the south coast of England, which became known as Chain Home, which provided a decisive advantage to the RAF in the Battle of Britain in 1940.

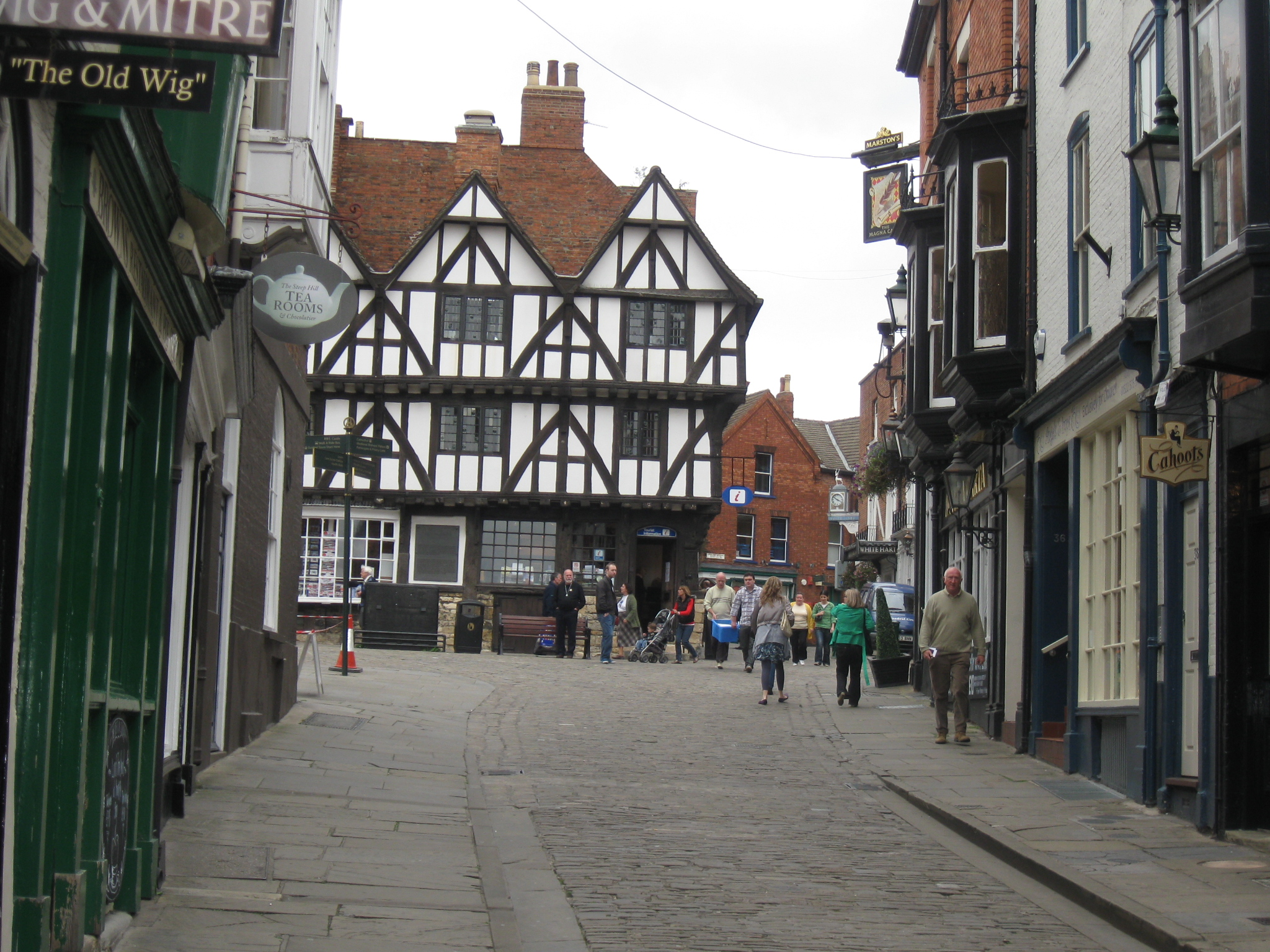
Steep Hill in Lincoln

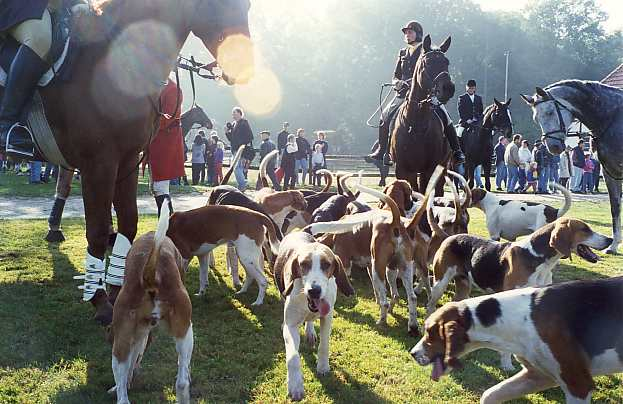
Fox hunting is historically linked with the East Midlands.

=== Culture and identity ===
==== Language and dialect ====
Parts of the East Midlands use a distinctive form of spoken dialect and accent. It also has some history in the beginnings of Received Pronunciation and southern England accents. However, spoken dialect and accent in the northern area of the East Midlands is far more similar to Northern English.

==== Identity ====
There is no modern Midlander, or East Midlander, identity. As Robert Shore wrote: "no one is more sceptical about the existence of an overarching Midland identity than Midlanders themselves." Inhabitants of the East Midlands tend to identify themselves either on a county or town basis, regarding the East Midlands as simply a bureaucratic area that lumps together dissimilar places. In the North of the region, in areas such as North Nottinghamshire and North Derbyshire, people culturally identify as Northerners. For example, a study by YouGov in 2018 found that a quarter of the inhabitants of the region identified as Northerners.

A new area of the North Midlands has been proposed, but this has not taken off. In Bassetlaw, the most northern local authority in the East Midlands area, many of the shared services such as NHS are with South Yorkshire, not with other Midlands areas. The television signal comes mainly from the Emley Moor transmitting station, which broadcasts local news from BBC Look North and Calendar News. And its officially designated BBC Local Radio station in terms of radio coverage is BBC Radio Sheffield. In 2016 Bassetlaw District Council voted to become part of the Sheffield City Region because of the strong local ties.

==== Food and cuisine ====
The area is known historically for its food, examples of which include Red Leicester, the Lincolnshire sausage, the Melton Mowbray pork pie, Stilton, the Bakewell pudding, and the Bramley apple.

==== The arts ====
Lord Byron and D. H. Lawrence are perhaps the region's best known authors, although the latter only gained full recognition in the late 20th century. The Key Words Reading Scheme (Peter and Jane) was first produced in 1964 by Ladybird of Loughborough and is still in print. The books originated in 1948 with an idea from Douglas Keen of Heanor; the first was British Birds and Their Nests. Ladybird Books were published in Loughborough throughout their 1960s and 1970s heyday, with the site closing in 1998.

Joseph Wright of Derby was an artist whose paintings symbolised the struggle between science and religious values in the Age of Enlightenment. He was also suggested to be "the first professional painter to express the spirit of the Industrial Revolution".

Charles Frederick Worth, born in Lincolnshire in 1825, is considered to be the founder of Parisian haute couture, ostensibly as the world's first true fashion designer.

==== Religion ====
William Booth of Nottingham founded The Salvation Army in 1865. Another religious order, the Pilgrim Fathers, originated from Babworth near Retford. The Quakers, also known as the Religious Society of Friends, were founded by Leicestershire-born (Fenny Drayton) George Fox, who had an inspiration whilst living in Mansfield in 1647. Thomas Cranmer from Aslockton compiled the Church of England Book of Common Prayer.

=== Industrial heritage ===
The region can claim the world's first factory, Sir Richard Arkwright's Cromford Mill. The world's oldest working factory can also be found in the area, producing textiles at Lea Bridge, owned by John Smedley. Both sites are part of the region's only World Heritage Site, the Derwent Valley Mills. An opportunist employee of the Derbyshire textile factories, Samuel Slater of Belper saw his chance and (illegally) eloped in 1789 to Rhode Island in the US after memorising the layout of the textile machinery while working at Jedediah Strutt's Milford Mill. He was warmly welcomed by the inhabitants of the newly formed USA, so much so that he was later named the "Father of the American Industrial Revolution".

Britain's hosiery and knitwear industry was largely based in the region, and in the 1980s it had more textile workers than any other British region. The stocking frame was invented in 1587 in Calverton, Nottinghamshire by Rev William Lee; these were the first known knitting machines and heralded the industrial revolution by providing the necessary machinery. The world's first (horse-powered) cotton mill was built in central Nottingham in 1768. Marvel's Mill in Northampton was the first cotton mill to be powered by water.

John Barber of Nottinghamshire had invented a simple gas turbine in 1791 (when living in Nuneaton). Lincoln was the site of the first tank (first built on 8 September 1915, Little Willie was the first tank, and is the oldest surviving tank in the world, originally called the No.1 Lincoln Machine), and Grantham the first diesel engine (in 1892). The jet engine was first developed in the region in Lutterworth and Whetstone, with the VTOL engine also (initially) developed in Hucknall. The first jet aircraft flew from RAF Cranwell in May 1941. During the Second World War, Derby was an important strategic location, as it was in Derby that Rolls-Royce developed and manufactured their iconic Merlin aero-engine. During the Second World War, all of R-R's engineering staff had been transferred to Belper.

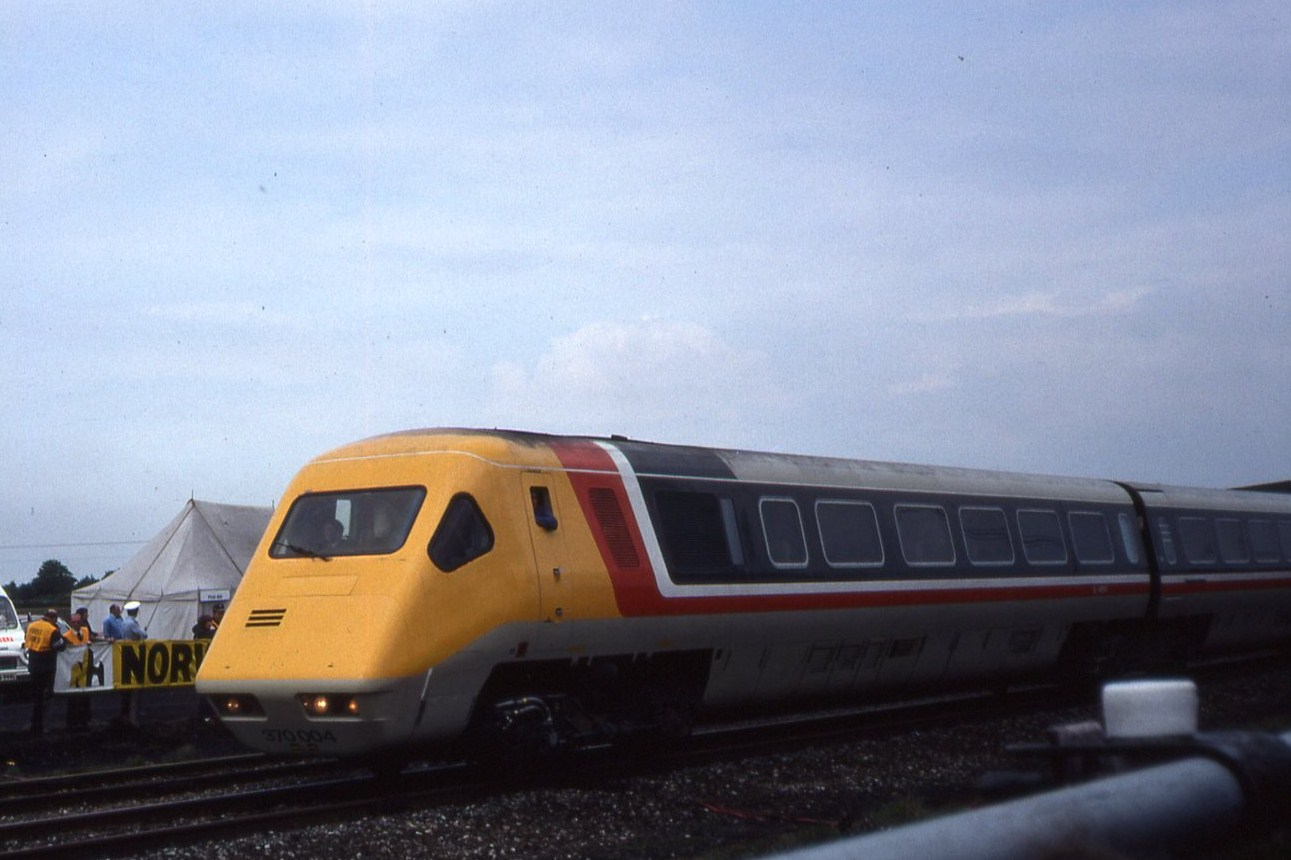
The innovative but aborted APT, designed in Derby, seen here in May 1980

Derby was home to two railway workshops, Derby Works and Derby Litchurch Lane Works initially for the Midland Railway, then the London, Midland & Scottish Railway, and finally British Rail. British Rail Research Division in Derby invented the APT (British Rail Class 370) and Maglev. The first steel rails were laid in 1857 at Derby railway station for the Midland Railway. Derby Litchurch Lane Works remains in operation under the ownership of Alstom

At its peak, Corby Steelworks was the largest in Britain. The collapsible baby buggy was invented in 1965 at Barby, Northamptonshire by Owen Maclaren. Ford's £8 million Daventry Parts Distribution Centre (Ford Parts Centre) was fully opened on 6 September 1972, the first southern section opened in 1968, and was the UK's largest building by floor area for many years at 36.7 acres (149,000 m^{2}), and is situated opposite the Cummins factory.

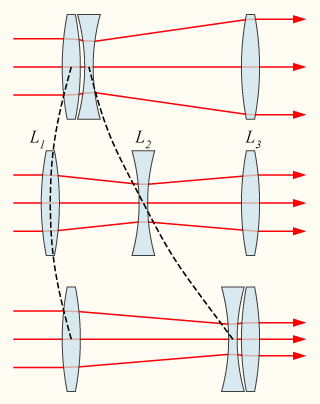
How a zoom lens works; the principle was largely first invented in Leicester.

The largest camera in the world was built in 1957 in Derby for Rolls-Royce, which weighed 27 tonnes and was around 8 feet (2.4 m) high, 8 feet (2.4 m) wide and 35 feet (11 m) long, with a 63-inch (1,600 mm) lens made by Cooke Apochromatic. Cooke Optics and Taylor-Hobson were major supplier of lenses for Hollywood; Star Wars was filmed with their lenses, filmed in England. Horace W. Lee invented the inverted telephoto lens (known as the Angénieux retrofocus) in 1931, lengthening the back focal length of the camera for the 1930s Technicolor Process and for vignetting.

Arthur Warmisham of Taylor & Hobson invented the first non-telescopic 35 mm zoom lens, the Cooke Varo 40– 120mm Lens, in a camera manufactured by Bell & Howell of the US. The popular 35 mm Eyemo film camera came with Cooke lenses. Much of World War II aerial photography, where definition was important, was through Cooke lenses, due to their apochromatic process. In the 1950s and 1960s, the Cooke Speed Panchro lenses were the most popular choice for cinema films, then from the 1970s their Varotal zoom lens, which would win Gordon Henry Cook the 1988 Gordon E. Sawyer Award at the Oscars. Harold Hopkins (physicist), of Leicester, also did important work on the zoom lens (he largely invented it) and fibre-optics.

J. P. Knight of Nottingham is credited with inventing green and red traffic lights, installed in London on 9 December 1868, but these lasted only three weeks; traffic lights would be introduced only from the 1920s, again in London (from an American-led design scheme). The first modern-day traffic lights were installed in Piccadilly from August 1926. Edgar Purnell Hooley, a Nottinghamshire surveyor, in 1901 was in Denby and found a stretch of road surface that was smooth from an accidental leak of tar over the surface. He patented a process of mixing tar with chipped stones in 1902, forming Tarmac, a name which he patented. Radcliffe Road (A6011) in West Bridgford in 1902 was the first tarmac road (5 miles or 8.0 kilometres long) in the world.

Mettoy was a firm in the St James area of Northampton, which from 1933 produced Corgi toys (mostly made in Swansea and designed in Northampton), and in the 1970s it made the space hopper; the company collapsed in 1983, moving to Swansea. In Leicestershire was Palitoy, another world-famous firm in Coalville; General Mills bought it in 1968, but production ceased in 1984 and the site was closed by Hasbro in 1994. Pedigree Dolls & Toys (Sindy) was in Wellingborough, closing in 1982. The first plastic DVD case was made in Corby by Amaray. Britain's first out-of-town shopping centre was opened in November 1964 by GEM at West Bridgford, on a site later owned by ASDA.

Much integrated circuit and semiconductor research was carried out by Plessey at Caswell near Towcester, ahead of the achievements in America by Jack Kilby; Plessey invented a model of the integrated circuit in 1957. Caswell was later a site for manufacturing monolithic microwave integrated circuits in the 1990s by Marconi. On 15 December 1966, the first electronic telephone exchange in Europe opened at Ambergate in Derbyshire.

Torksey Viaduct, built across the Trent in 1849, is considered to be the first box girder bridge, designed by Sir John Fowler, 1st Baronet. The tallest freestanding structure in the region is the chimney of West Burton power station (north Nottinghamshire) at 200 m (656 ft). Nottingham Combined Heating and Power Scheme is the largest district heating system in the UK, centred on the Eastcroft incinerator, opened in 1973.

=== Second World War ===
Most of the region was protected by a solitary RAF station, RAF Digby near Sleaford, part of No. 12 Group RAF and controlled from RAF Watnall. Within the East Midlands, only Nottingham was heavily bombed during the Second World War's Blitz, due to the presence of a large Royal Ordnance factory. However, much of the aerial obliteration of Germany was directed from the region, with two bomber groups based in Lincolnshire (No.1 and No.5), and a few squadrons in South Nottinghamshire. The proliferation of Second World War airfields in Lincolnshire led to it being known as Bomber County.

=== Regional governance ===
The government office region was created in 1994. Government funding decisions moved from Melton Mowbray (the East Midlands Regional Assembly) to Nottingham (the East Midlands Development Agency) in April 2010.

== Demographics ==
Relative population map.

Total East Midlands population (wikidata:Q47994) = 4,533,222 (2011 United Kingdom Census 2011)
(WD = Wikidata page)

[Hide/show county populations]
	East Midlands	pop.
1	Derbyshire	1,056,000^{WD}
2	Leicestershire	1,067,121^{WD}
3	Lincolnshire	755,833^{WD}
4	Northamptonshire	757,181^{WD}
5	Nottinghamshire	1,170,475^{WD}
6	Rutland	41,151^{WD}

Population pyramid in 2020

For teenage pregnancy rates in the region, Nottingham is the top-tier authority. Of the council districts, Corby has the highest rate. Of the top-tier authorities, Rutland has the lowest rate for any district in England. The council district with the lowest rate is South Northamptonshire, although it has a rate greater than that of Rutland. Rutland has the highest total fertility rate for British counties (top-tier authorities). The borough of Boston has the highest TFR for district councils.

The region has the second-lowest overall population density in England (after South West England), eased by the low population density of Lincolnshire and Rutland. In 2007, the region had a lower percentage of degree-educated people than the English average. Of the region's population, 29.5 per cent live in rural areas.

=== Ethnicity ===
Ethnic Group	1981 estimations		1991		2001		2011		2021	
Ethnic Group	Number	%	Number	%	Number	%	Number	%	Number	%
White: Total	3,598,625	96.2%	3,765,389	95.2%	3,900,380	93.48%	4,046,356	89.26%	4,179,774	85.7%
White: British	–	–	–	–	3,807,731	91.26%	3,871,146	85.39%	3,882,390	79.6%
White: Irish	–	–	–	–	35,478	0.85%	28,676	0.63%	27,130	0.6%
White: Gypsy or Irish Traveller (Note: New category created for the 2011 census)	–	–	–	–	–	–	3,418	–	4,620	0.1%
White: Roma	–	–	–	–	–	–	–	–	7,196	0.1%
White: Other	–	–	–	–	57,171	1.37%	143,116	3.15%	258,438	5.3%
Asian or Asian British: Total	–	–	135,257	3.4%	181,846	4.35%	293,423	6.47%	391,103	8%
Asian or Asian British: Indian	–	–	98,859		122,347	2.93%	168,928	3.72%	229,831	4.7%
Asian or Asian British: Pakistani	–	–	17,407		27,859	0.66%	48,940	1.07%	71,038	1.5%
Asian or Asian British: Bangladeshi	–	–	4,161		6,928	0.16%	13,258	0.29%	20,980	0.4%
Asian or Asian British: Chinese (Note: In 2001, listed under the 'Chinese or other ethnic group' heading.)	–	–	7,588		12,900	0.3%	24,404	0.53%	22,973	0.5%
Asian or Asian British: Other Asian	–	–	7,242		11,812	0.28%	37,893	0.83%	46,281	0.9%
Black or Black British: Total	–	–	38,566	1%	39,477	0.94%	81,484	1.79%	129,986	2.6%
Black or Black British: African	–	–	3,467		9,186	0.22%	41,768	0.92%	83,161	1.7%
Black or Black British: Caribbean	–	–	24,431		26,671	0.63%	28,913	0.63%	30,828	0.6%
Black or Black British: Other Black	–	–	10,668		3,620	–	10,803	0.23%	15,997	0.3%
Mixed: Total	–	–	–	–	43,148	1.03%	86,224	1.9%	117,247	2.4%
Mixed: White and Black Caribbean	–	–	–	–	20,657	0.49%	40,404	0.89%	46,400	1.0%
Mixed: White and Black African	–	–	–	–	3,429	–	8,814	0.19%	14,341	0.3%
Mixed: White and Asian	–	–	–	–	11,176	0.26%	21,688	0.47%	30,803	0.6%
Mixed: Other Mixed	–	–	–	–	7,886	0.18%	15,318	0.33%	25,703	0.5%
Other: Total	–	–	14,160	0.4%	7,345	0.17%	25,735	0.56%	61,944	1.3%
Other: Arab	–	–	–	–	–	–	9,746	0.21%	13,360	0.3%
Other: Any other ethnic group	–	–	14,160	0.4%	7,345	0.17%	15,989	0.35%	48,584	1.0%
Non-White: Total	140,991	3.8%	187,983	4.8%	271,816	6.5%	486,866	10.7%	700,280	14.3%
Total	3,739,616	100%	3,953,372	100%	4,172,196	100%	4,533,222	100%	4,880,054	100%

=== Religion ===
Religion in the East Midlands
Religion	2021		2011		2001	
Religion	Number	%	Number	%	Number	%
Christianity	2,214,151	45.4%	2,666,172	58.8%	3,003,475	72.0%
Islam	210,766	4.3%	140,649	3.1%	70,224	1.7%
Hinduism	120,345	2.5%	89,723	2.0%	66,710	1.6%
Sikhism	53,950	1.1%	44,335	1.0%	33,551	0.8%
Buddhism	14,521	0.3%	12,672	0.3%	7,541	0.2%
Judaism	4,313	0.09%	4,254	0.09%	4,075	0.1%
Other religion	24,813	0.5%	17,918	0.4%	9,863	0.2%
No religion	1,950,354	40.0%	1,248,056	27.5%	664,845	15.9%
Religion not stated	286,841	5.9%	309,443	6.8%	311,890	7.5%
Total population	4,880,054	100%	4,533,222	100%	4,172,174	100%

=== Social deprivation ===
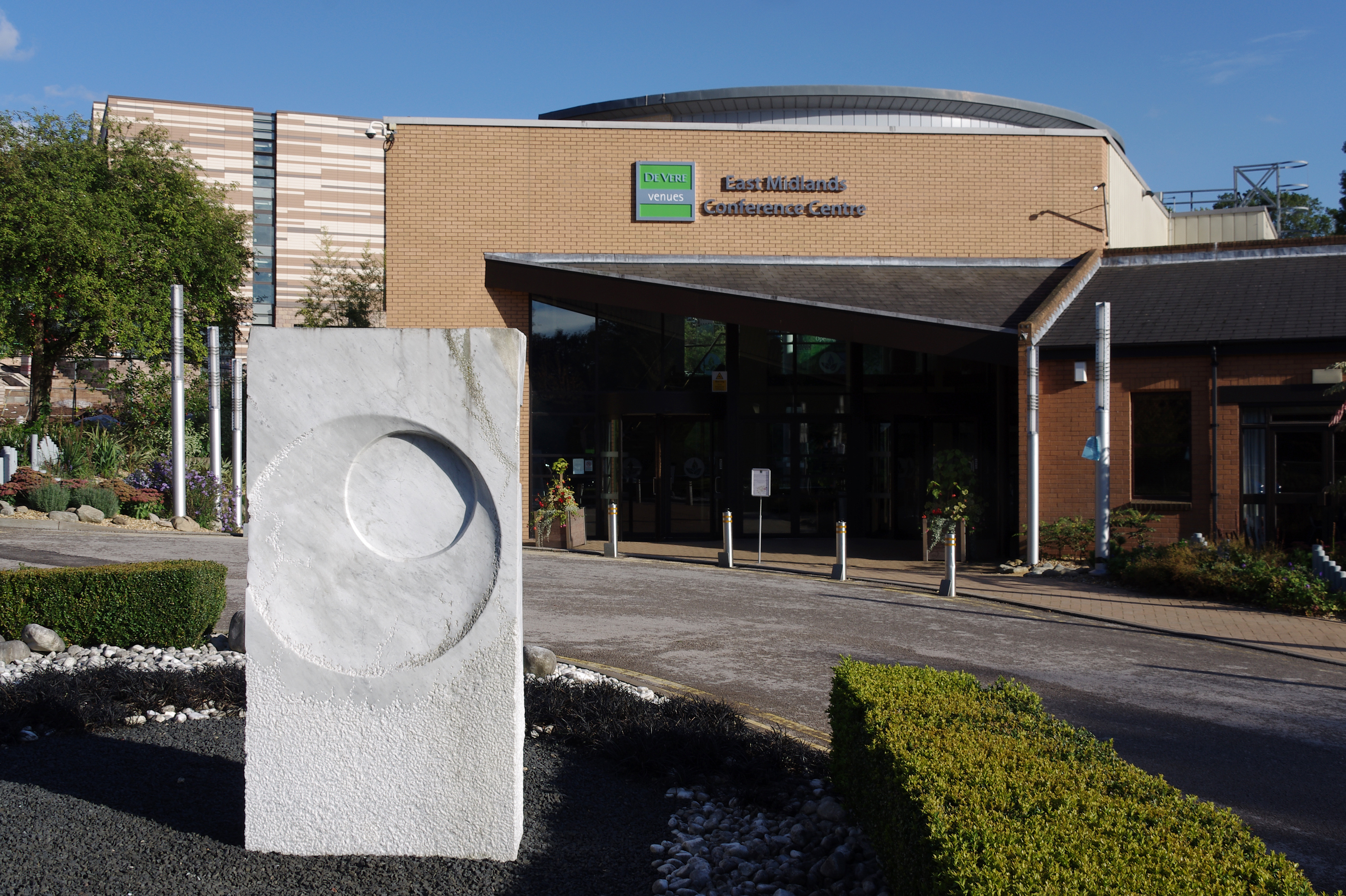
The De Veres Venues East Midlands Conference Centre at the University of Nottingham in September 2012

The region as a whole is less deprived than the West Midlands and regions in the North of England. By measurement of Lower Layer Super Output Areas, the East Midlands has more in common with the South of England (except London) than the North, in that it has more areas in the 20 per cent least deprived areas than the 20 per cent most deprived areas, but less so than regions in Southern England. This has been explained by academic statisticians, who claim the area straddles the north–south divide.

The region does not show typical economic characteristics of Northern England (which the West Midlands does), although it is not as affluent as large parts of the South of England. Economically, the East Midlands bears a similarity to South West England.

In March 2011, the average unemployment claimant count for the region was 3.6 per cent. Nottingham and Leicester were the highest with 5.8 per cent each. Next were Corby and Lincoln with 4.9 per cent. The lowest were Rutland and South Northamptonshire with 1.4 per cent each, and Harborough, with 1.6 per cent.

== Elections ==
General election results in 2017

The East Midlands is represented by forty-seven Members of Parliament (MPs), a gain of one after the most recent Periodic Review. At the 2024 general election, the region elected twenty-nine Labour Party MPs, fifteen Conservatives, two from Reform UK and one independent. Labour Party MPs were primarily elected in Derbyshire (where they won all eleven seats) and Nottinghamshire, whilst Conservatives were mostly elected in Leicestershire and Lincolnshire.

In 2009, Nottinghamshire and Derbyshire county councils changed control from Labour to Conservative. From 1993 to 2005, Northampton was controlled by Labour, but has since been controlled by the Conservatives. Lincolnshire and Leicestershire have historically been Conservative, hence all the main county councils are Conservative controlled.

Party	Seats won at each general election				
Party	2010	2015	2017	2019	2024
Labour Party	15	14	15	8	29
Conservative Party	31	32	31	38	15
Reform UK				0	2
Independents	0	0	0	0	1

=== MEPs ===
The East Midlands was a five-member constituency for the European Parliament.

== Regions ==
=== Eurostat NUTS ===
In the Eurostat Nomenclature of Territorial Units for Statistics (NUTS), the East Midlands form a level-1 NUTS region, coded "UKF", which is subdivided as follows:

NUTS 1	Code	NUTS 2	Code	NUTS 3	Code
East Midlands	UKF	Derbyshire and Nottinghamshire	UKF1	Derby	UKF11
		Derbyshire and Nottinghamshire	UKF1	East Derbyshire (Bolsover, Chesterfield, North East Derbyshire)	UKF12
		Derbyshire and Nottinghamshire	UKF1	South and West Derbyshire (Amber Valley, Derbyshire Dales, Erewash, High Peak, South Derbyshire)	UKF13
		Derbyshire and Nottinghamshire	UKF1	Nottingham	UKF14
		Derbyshire and Nottinghamshire	UKF1	North Nottinghamshire (Ashfield, Bassetlaw, Mansfield, Newark and Sherwood)	UKF15
		Derbyshire and Nottinghamshire	UKF1	South Nottinghamshire (Broxtowe, Gedling, Rushcliffe)	UKF16
		Leicestershire, Rutland and Northamptonshire	UKF2	Leicester	UKF21
		Leicestershire, Rutland and Northamptonshire	UKF2	Leicestershire CC and Rutland	UKF22
		Leicestershire, Rutland and Northamptonshire	UKF2	West Northamptonshire	UKF24
		Leicestershire, Rutland and Northamptonshire	UKF2	North Northamptonshire	UKF25
		Lincolnshire	UKF3	Lincolnshire CC	UKF30

=== Local government ===
The official region consists of the following subdivisions:

Map	Ceremonial county	Shire county /unitary	Districts
	Derbyshire	1. Derbyshire	a) High Peak, b) Derbyshire Dales, c) South Derbyshire, d) Erewash, e) Amber Valley, f) North East Derbyshire, g) Chesterfield, h) Bolsover
	Derbyshire	2. Derby U.A.	
	Nottinghamshire	3. Nottinghamshire	a) Rushcliffe, b) Broxtowe, c) Ashfield, d) Gedling, e) Newark and Sherwood, f) Mansfield, g) Bassetlaw
	Nottinghamshire	4. Nottingham U.A.	
	Lincolnshire (part only)	5. Lincolnshire	a) Lincoln, b) North Kesteven, c) South Kesteven, d) South Holland, e) Boston, f) East Lindsey, g) West Lindsey
	Leicestershire	6. Leicestershire	a) Charnwood, b) Melton, c) Harborough, d) Oadby and Wigston, e) Blaby, f) Hinckley and Bosworth, g) North West Leicestershire
	Leicestershire	7. Leicester U.A.	
8. Rutland
	9. Northamptonshire	a, b, c) West Northamptonshire U.A.	
	9. Northamptonshire	d, e, f, g) North Northamptonshire U.A.	

== Economy ==
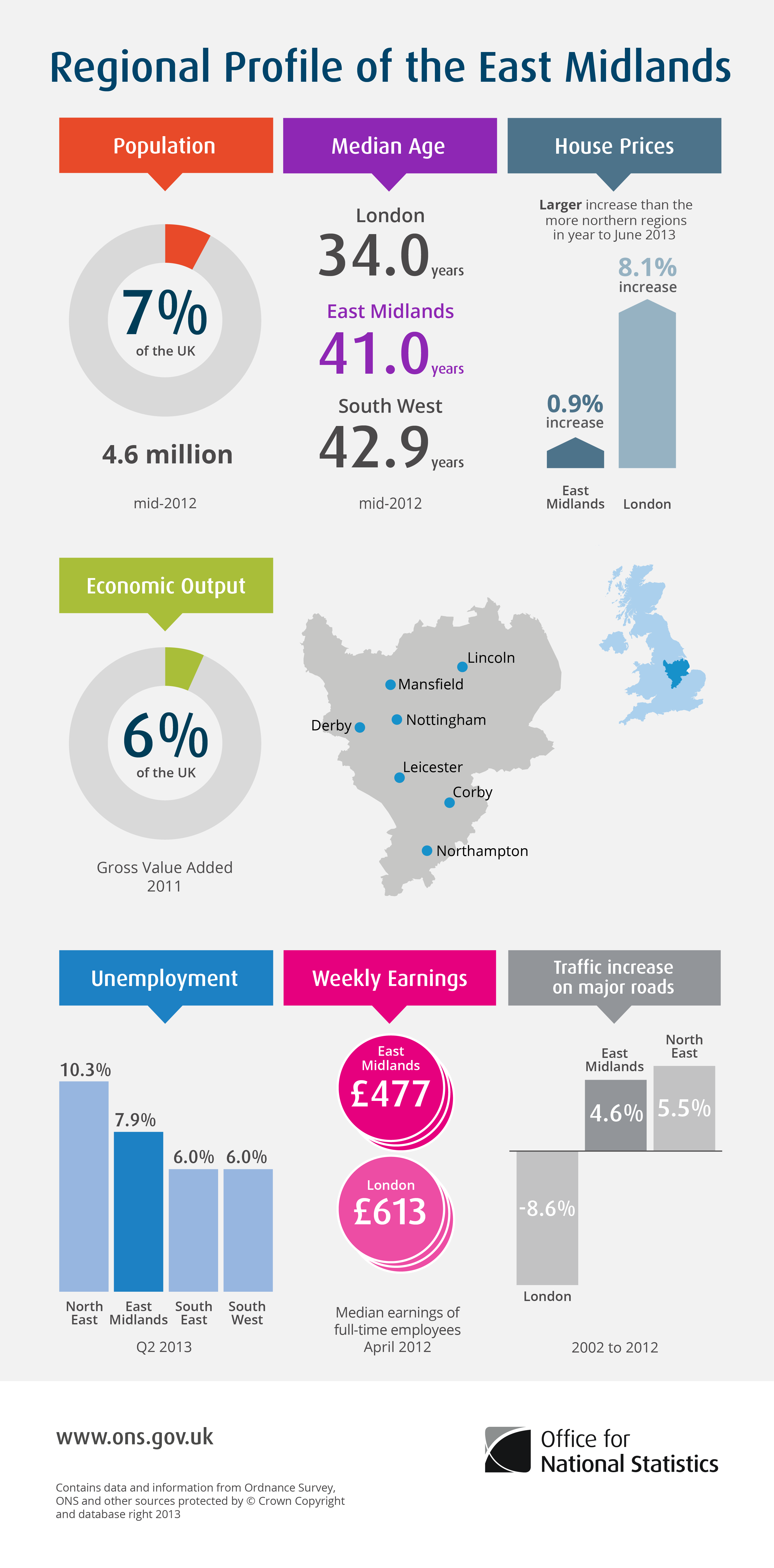
A profile of the economy of East Midlands in 2012

The Manufacturing Advisory Service for the region was based on the A606 in Melton Mowbray, next to East Midlands Councils.

=== Manufacturing ===
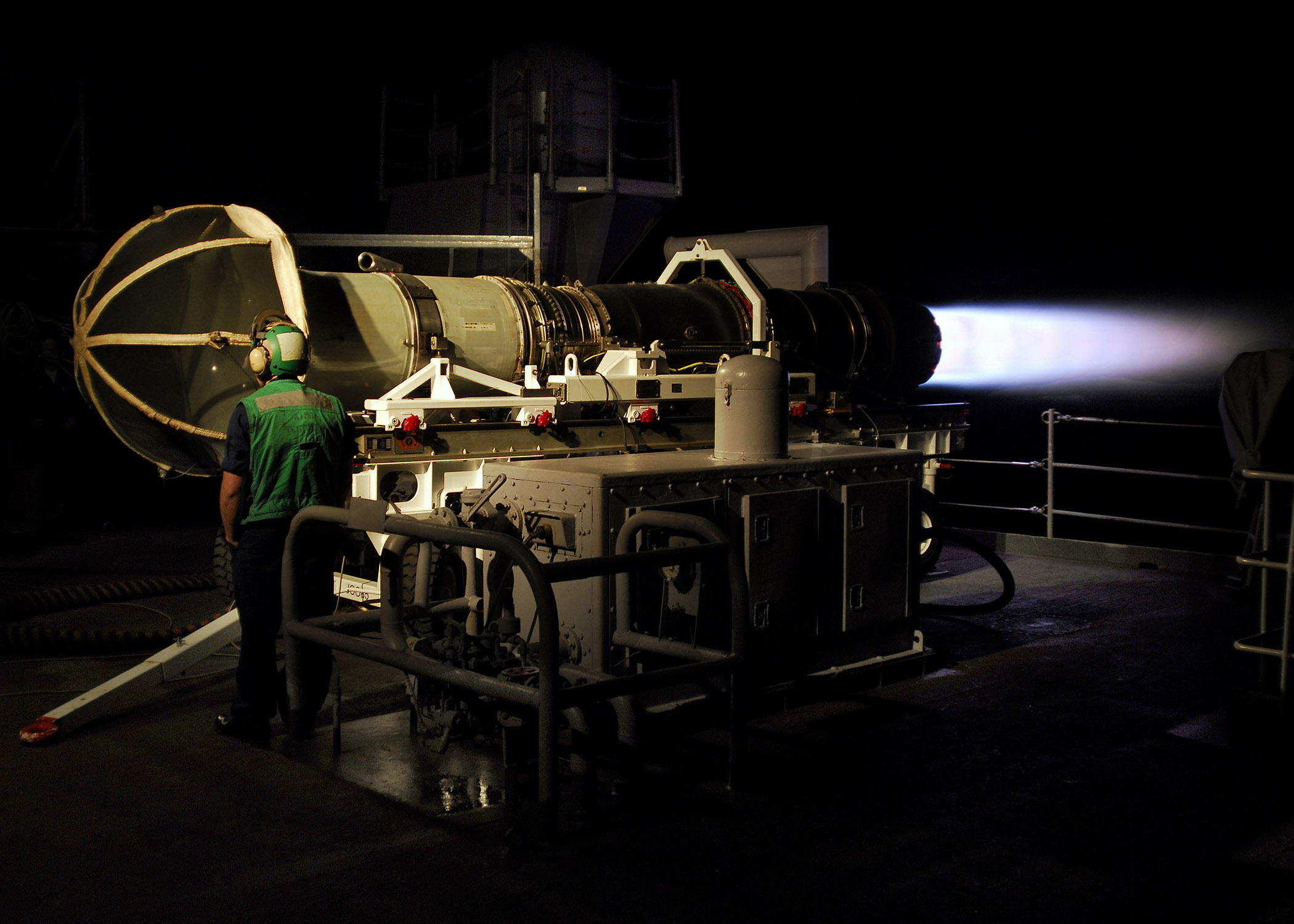
The jet engine was built and developed in the region.

In 2023, 14.8% of economic output in the East Midlands was in manufacturing, compared to the UK average of 9.1%. This is the second highest percentage of manufacturing contribution to GDP of any region in the UK, behind Wales.

For engineering, Rolls-Royce (the world's second-largest maker of aircraft engines) in Sinfin and Rolls-Royce Marine Power Operations are both in Derby. Siemens Industrial Turbomachinery (former GEC, then Alstom) make industrial gas turbines in Lincoln, with a former division making aero-engine components, part of ITP Engines based at Whetstone, next door to Hardinge Machine Tools UK (former Bridgeport). Cytec Industries UK (owned since 2016 by Solvay) have a composites research centre in the south of Heanor. Meggitt Polymers & Composites (formerly Dunlop) are on the A512 in Shepshed, who make seals for aircraft.

Triumph Motorcycles and Ultima Sports (sports cars) are in Hinckley. Cummins make diesel engines in Daventry, and build AC generators in Stamford, with its spares division at Wellingborough (near Mahle). 80% of the world's Formula One cars are made in Northamptonshire. At the north of Motorsport Valley, Cosworth and MAHLE Powertrain (Cosworth Technology before January 2005) are next to the Nene in Northampton, with an engine block plant in Wellingborough. Force India and Delta Motorsport are at Silverstone, Mercedes AMG High Performance Powertrains is in Brixworth, and Mercedes-Benz F1 at Brackley.

Near Leicester, Noble are in Barwell and Fenix Automotive in Braunstone. Eibach UK (shock absorbers) is off the B581 in Broughton Astley. KTM UK (high-performance motorcycles) is at Buckingham Industrial Estate in southeast Brackley; to the west, next door was Brawn GP (Honda F1 before 2008) in Evenley. Van Hool UK (coachwork) is in Wellingborough.

Caetano UK is based near Coalville, a UK coachwork distributor for National Express. AGC Automotive UK make automotive glass (tempered glass and laminated glass) on Round Spinney Industrial Estate in Northampton. Plastic Omnium Automotive make automotive exteriors in the west of Measham. On a former airfield is Lippstadt-based Hella UK (LED automobile lighting, and Europe's largest automobile lighting manufacturer) in Chipping Warden and Aston le Walls. Ilmor is in Brixworth, and Bowler Offroad is in Belper.

JCB Power Systems is near Foston, Derbyshire and nearby Toyota Manufacturing UK (TMUK) is at Burnaston, where its 3,000 employees make the Auris and Avensis. Resonate Group (formerly DeltaRail Group) is in Derby, and train manufacturer Bombardier UK (British Rail Engineering Limited before 1996 then ABB Adtranz) is at Derby Litchurch Lane Works, in Litchurch; it built the Nottingham Express Transit AT6/5 trams in 2004, the Electrostar, Turbostar and Aventra fleets, and London Underground trains. APPH (part of BBA Aviation) make aircraft landing gear next to Kirkby-in-Ashfield railway station. Raleigh Bicycle Company is based in New Eastwood.

Essentra Packaging (formerly Payne) nearby in Giltbrook, next to IKEA, makes tear tape, owned by Essentra. Giant UK (high performance bicycles) on the Charnwood Edge Business Park in Cossington. Mettler Toledo UK (industrial weighing) is in the west of Beaumont Leys. Ferodo is in Chapel-en-le-Frith, having made brake pads since its founder Herbert Frood invented them in Combs in 1897. Carbolite, which makes industrial furnaces, is in the Hope Valley.

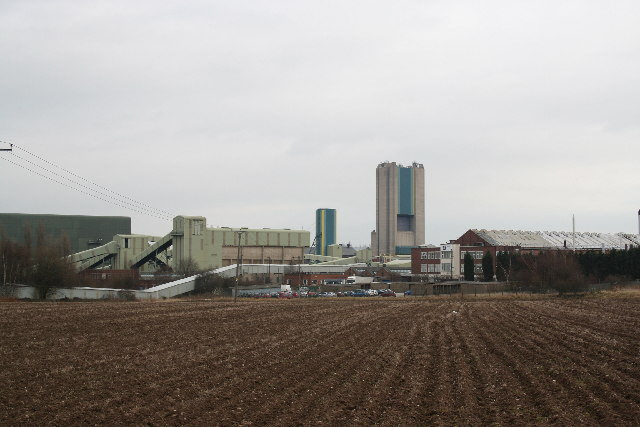
UK Coal (formerly RJB Mining) was based in Styrrup near Harworth. The north part of Derbyshire and Nottinghamshire used to have many coal mines, and the last two pits producing in Nottinghamshire were near Market Warsop and Ollerton.

FKI who own Brush Electrical Machines is in Loughborough, home to the Energy Technologies Institute and John Taylor & Co, which although entering administration in 2009, is the largest bell foundry in the world. Eco-Bat Technologies, based in South Darley, smelt, mine lead, being the world's biggest producer, and own eighteen sites across the world. Scott Bader develop and manufacture polyester resins for glass-reinforced plastic (fiberglass, and gelcoats) at Wollaston.

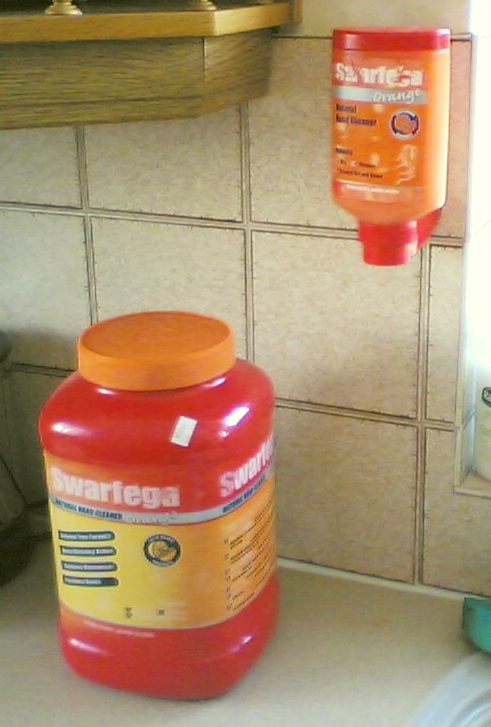
Swarfega was invented and is made by Deb in Belper.

Tata Steel Tubes Europe is in Corby. Barnes Aerospace have their European headquarters in central Derby. JJ Churchill make turbine blades for jet engines in the east of Market Bosworth. Ross Ceramics north of Derby make ceramic cores for casting turbine blades (at Rolls-Royce). The Alumasc Group is in Burton Latimer. Sealed Air UK on the Telford Way Industrial Estate, makes Bubble Wrap, which its parent USA company invented in 1960.

The Motor Industry Research Association has an important test track at Higham on the Hill. Hendrickson Europe make truck suspensions at Sywell Airport. Timsons make printers in Kettering. Heckler & Koch is in Lenton. On the Dukeries Industrial Estate, Worksop Galvanizers (Wedge Group) have the largest galvanizing bath (zinc) in the UK. Cooper Bussmann (formerly Hawker Fusegear) makes electrical fuses in Burton on the Wolds. Pearce Signs, one of the UK's largest sign-makers, is based in New Basford. Nylacast is an international engineered plastics company based in Humberstone, Leicester. Sapa are on the Saw Pit Lane Industrial Estate with Storetec, the UK base of Wanzl shopping trolleys.

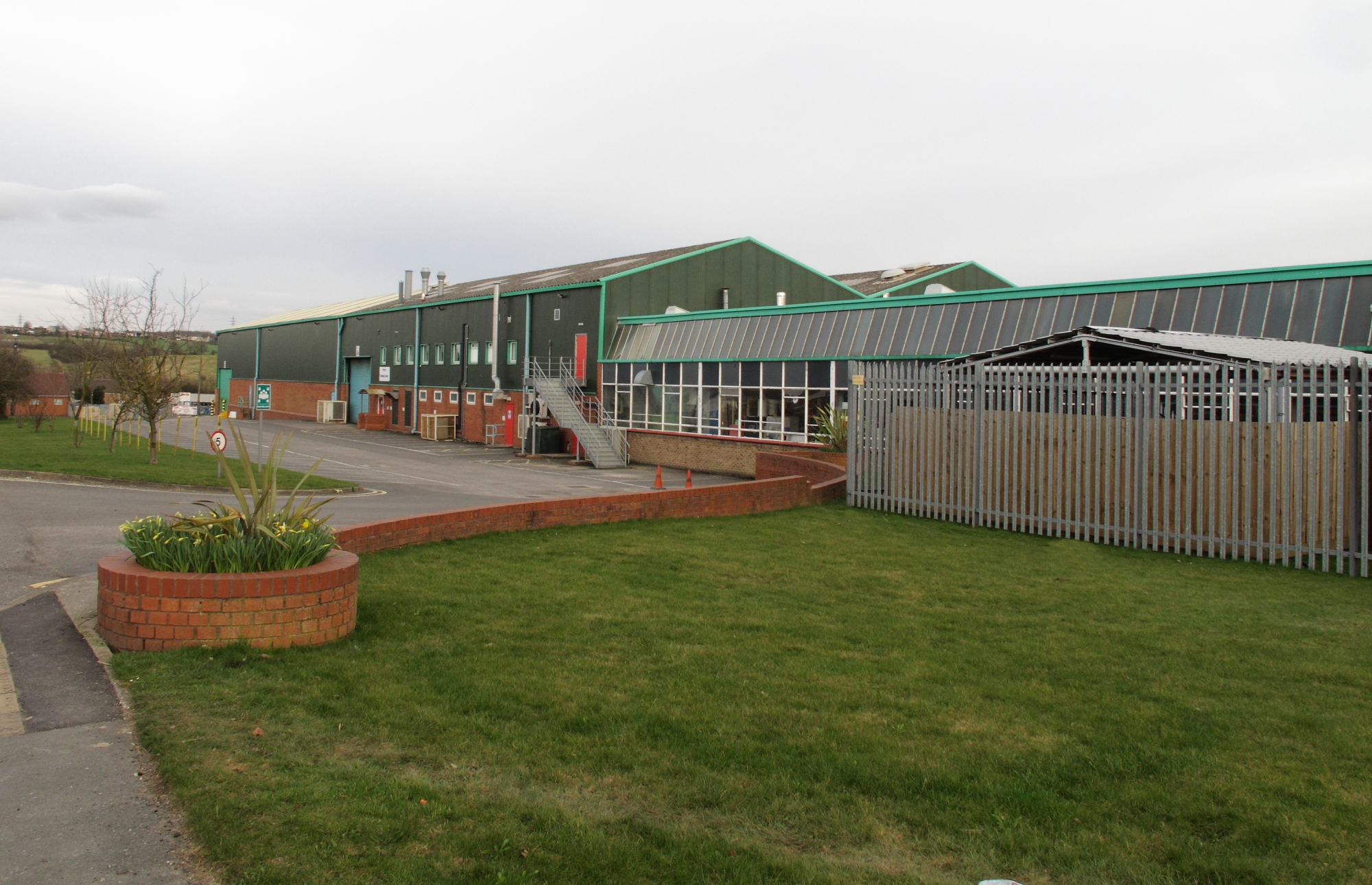
Worcester Bosch Thermokinetics makes its oil-fired and floor-standing boilers at its Danesmoor Works.

RPC Group in Rushden, is a large (international, the largest of its type in Europe) packaging company, and make the bottles for Heinz Tomato Ketchup. Granger's, on the Clover Nook Industrial Estate at Pinxton, make Cherry Blossom shoe polish. Fusion Provida based in Chesterfield makes pipe jointings and electrofusion fittings for the oil and gas industry. Vaillant UK (Hepworth Heating before 2002, with headquarters in Remscheid) make Glow-worm boilers near Belper School.

The Watchkeeper WK450 UAV is built jointly by Thales and Elbit in west Leicester; it is tested at Aberporth Airport in Wales; 54 are on order, costing £1bn. BAE Systems Land & Armaments had a tank factory, which closed in May 2011 when it lost the FRES contract, given to General Dynamics; the site, owned by Thales, initially made naval radar systems. The large Sunningdale site on Braunstone Frith was the British Shoe Corporation. Chemring Defence UK (military pyrotechnics) is at Draycott and Church Wilne. Invicta Plastics (injection moulding) is on Scudamore Road.

Hoval, near Newark Northgate station, make industrial boilers in Lincoln for international customers, and have a Royal Warrant. Jayplas, the UK's biggest plastic recycling company is based in Great Oakley, with a plastic recycling site in South Normanton. Fairline Boats are based on the Nene in Oundle; nearby are Poclain Hydraulics UK on the Nene Business Park.

Laser Performance makes the Laser sailing boat in Long Buckby. Abbott & Co.(Newark) Ltd, Established in 1870 and based in The Newark Boiler Works, made boilers in the 1870s for the Royal Navy and since then design and build a large range of pressure vessels, some of which were used on HMS Queen Elizabeth (R08).

Taylor, Taylor & Hobson 1925 advert

Spector Lumenex (part of Tyco) make warning systems in Mapperley. Flowserve UK (formerly Worthington-Simpson, then Ingersoll-Dresser) in Balderton are the largest manufacturer of industrial pumps in the UK. Hako Machines UK, a Schleswig-Holstein supplier of industrial sweepers and road cleaners are in Crick. Bostik, which from 1930 until 1990, was owned by British United Shoe Machinery of Leicester, still has a main factory and research site (its construction division) in Belgrave; until 1962 it was made by BB Chemical, with its other main brand being the water-resistant Prestik for making sealing strips.

Taylor Hobson (an international metrology company) is in Leicester, bought by Ametek in 2004; with a former division of the company, Cooke Optics, a camera lens manufacturer, further north in Thurmaston. The Gent fire alarm company, owned by Honeywell since 2005, is north of Humberstone. Matsuura Machinery UK (CNC machine tools) is in Coalville.

Ardagh (Metal Box from 1962, then Impress Group) make tin cans north of Fabrikat; Pandrol UK in Worksop make resilient rail fastenings. ThyssenKrupp UK is in Lenton, and further north is ZF Services UK (wind turbine and automotive gears). In Nottingham is Thomas & Betts UK (formerly W & J Furse, and bought by ABB in 2012), a world leader in lightning and earthing protection.

=== Construction and building materials ===
Topps Tiles are in Enderby, with the national distribution centre of British Gas, the largest warehouse of gas spare parts in Europe, next door. Holcim UK (part of Holcim since July 2015, when Paris-based Lafarge merged with Swiss-based Holcim) is based at Bardon Hall in Bardon. Mountsorrel has the largest granite quarry in Europe, owned by the French company, Lafarge (owned by Redland plc until 1997). BPB plc (British Plasterboard), the world's largest manufacturer of plasterboard (calcium sulphate) who own British Gypsum, is based in East Leake, Nottinghamshire. They also have a large site at Barrow upon Soar. Artex Ltd., part of the same company, is in Ruddington.

Hörmann UK (garage doors) is in Coalville. Barratt Developments (housing) is in Ellistown and Battleflat (Bardon), southeast of Coalville; Ibstock is the largest brick manufacturer (900 million a year, with twenty factories) in the UK, nearby; . Lafarge Aggregates & Concrete UK is in Syston. Roca UK and Laufen UK (sanitaryware) are in the north of Coalville, on the Hermitage Industrial Estate, towards Stephenson College. Krohne UK at Wellingborough make Coriolis mass flowmeters. AvantiGas (former Shell Gas LPG) is at Duckmanton in Staveley. Sandvik Mining and Construction UK are on the Astron Business Park, Swadlincote, near Brunel Healthcare. DSF Refractories & Minerals are the UK's last main refractory company at Friden.

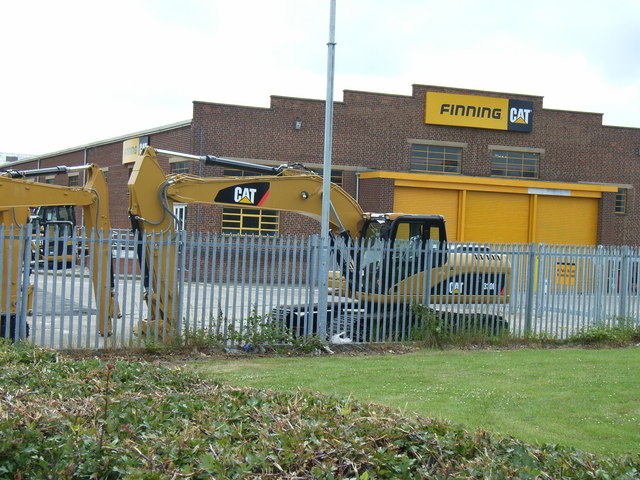
Caterpillar at Desford

Caterpillar Building Construction Products makes backhoe loaders, wheel loaders, telehandlers, and mini excavators. TEREX Pegson make mobile caterpillar-tracked crushing machines next to the railway in Coalville. SAME Deutz-Fahr UK, is a tractor manufacturer based in Barby north of Daventry, owned by Treviglio of Italy.

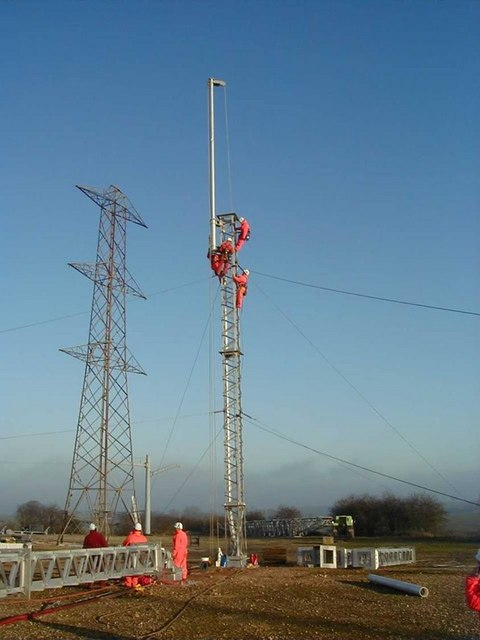
National Grid plc has its main Ofsted-checked Eakring Training Centre in Nottinghamshire, where trainees learn how to build electricity pylons, including the T pylon; National Grid has other training sites in Hollinwood and Hitchin.

Premier Pitches of Nether Handley, at Unstone in northeast Derbyshire, made the pitch for Wembley Stadium, as well as many other main pitches. Hewitt Sportsturf, in Cosby, supplied the turf (360 rolls) for the Olympic Stadium in March 2011, although it was grown near Scunthorpe; a division of the company, Petersfield Growing Mediums, which supplies compost, has a Royal Warrant. Werner UK (Britain's leading manufacturer of metal step ladders) moved its ABRU site to Essex in 2016.

=== Textiles and clothing ===
The fashion company Paul Smith is in Lenton. The high end metallic thread supplier Lurex is based in Whetstone, Leicestershire. The lingerie companies Gossard, Aristoc, Pretty Polly, and Berlei (formerly owned by Courtaulds, later CUK Clothing) were based in Daybrook; most of their hosiery was made at West Mill in Belper.

Speedo International Limited is near Experian, (formerly in Bobbers Mill near Basford before 2010). Its LZR Racer suit helped Michael Phelps win eight golds at the 2008 Olympics. In Enderby is Next, created by George Davies in 1981, which is the largest company in the region (and the Midlands) by number of employees with 59,000, and has the second largest turnover (£3 billion) of companies headquartered in the region, after Boots (£6 billion).

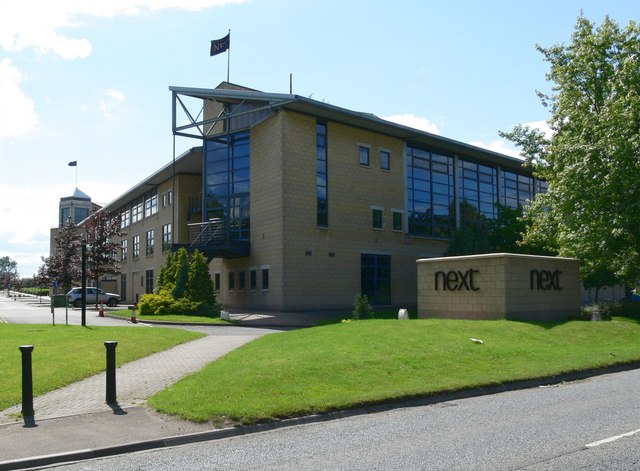
Headquarters of Next Retailing in July 2007 at Enderby, next to the M69; the largest company by turnover in the Midlands

Boden (clothing) is on the Meridian estate in Leicester. Wolsey (clothing) is northeast of Leicester, east of Rushey Mead. Scott Nichol make traditional socks in Hinckley. Per Una have a factory near Cossington. Much of Britain's lingerie and hosiery is made in the region. Guilford Europe (former Guilford Kapwood), at Somercotes, makes fabric (warp knitting) for sports clothing and automotive products, and have been owned by Lear Corporation since 2012.

Many footwear companies such as Shoe Zone (which bought out Stead and Simpson), are based in Leicester. Brantano Footwear UK, based in Leicester before 2002, were in Ellistown and Battleflat until March 2017, just south of Coalville, near Nestlé's national distribution centre. Loake make shoes at Kettering, and have a Royal appointment. Church's Shoes are at Northampton. Tricker's shoes in Northampton have a royal warrant. Sanders & Sanders and Grenson make shoes in Rushden. Crockett & Jones make shoes in the northeast of Northampton. The BLC Leather Technology Centre is in Moulton and SATRA, in west Kettering, both conduct footwear research. Aspex make sports sunglasses in Moulton, near Moulton College.

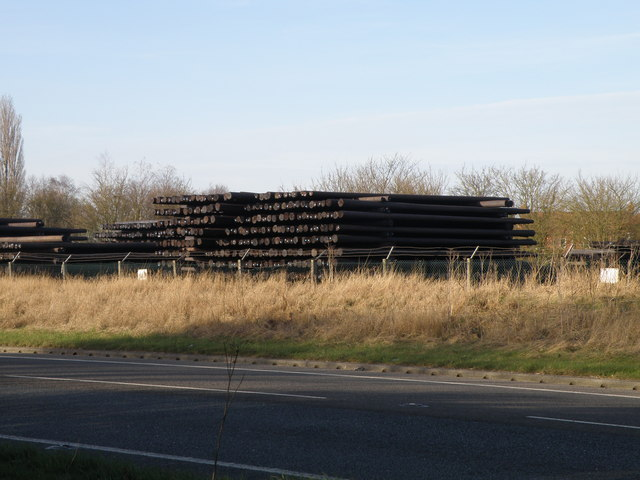
Calders & Grandidge in the south of Boston are the UK's largest supplier of telegraph poles and wooden railway sleepers

Sports Direct is based in Shirebrook. At the Trent Business Centre is Sunspel, who introduced the t-shirt to the British market; nearby Meadowmead make premium furniture, and Aga Rangemaster Group make kitchen sinks. Duresta Upholstery is in Long Eaton, with a factory of DFS opposite. W&G Sissons on the Chesterfield Est, owned by Franke, has been the UK's largest manufacturer of stainless steel sinks since the 1950s. Parker Knoll make high-end furniture on the Greenhill Industrial Estate, south of Alfreton. Gunn & Moore (GM), north of Trent Bridge cricket ground, is an exclusive cricket bat manufacturer.

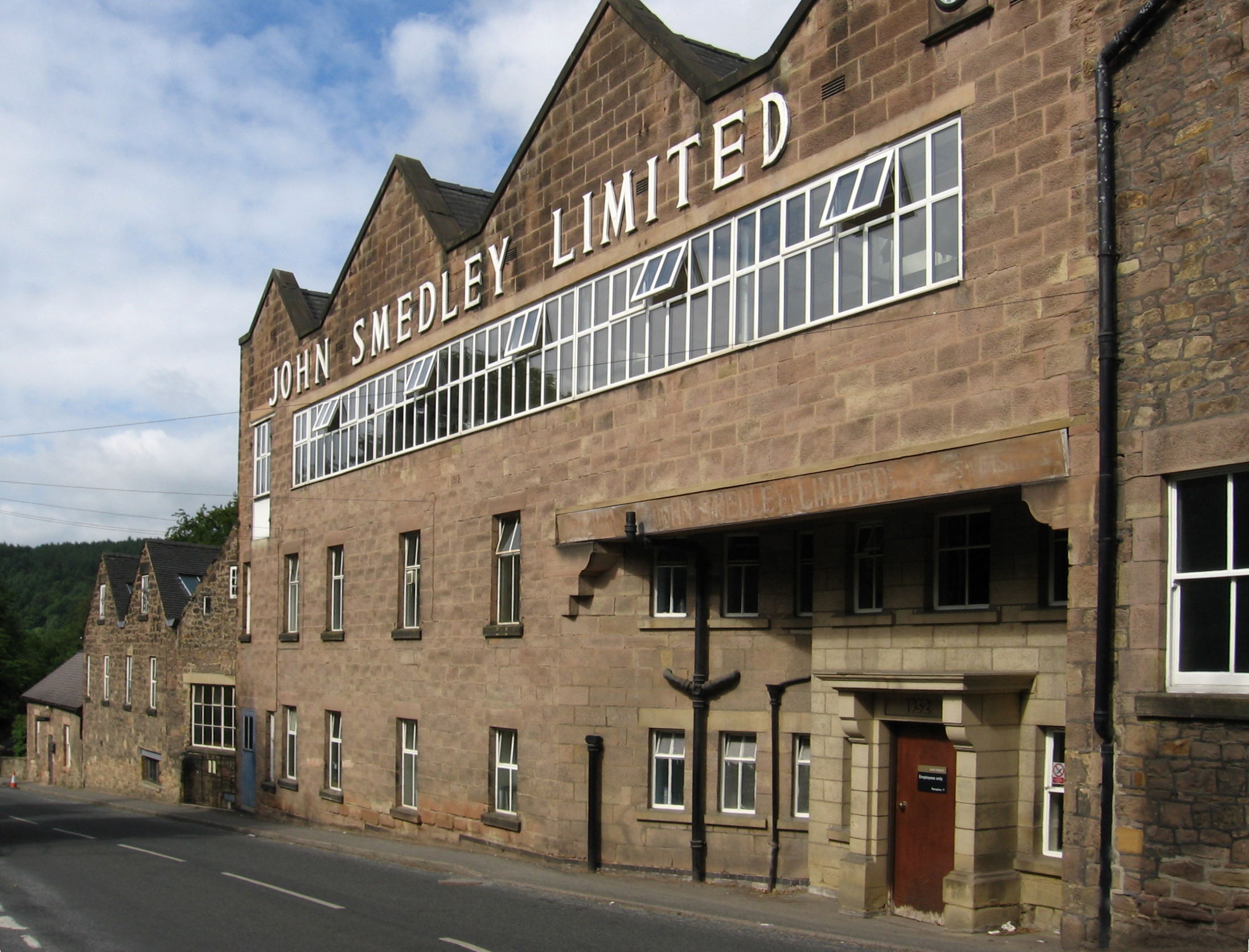
John Smedley factory at Lea Mills: the oldest working factory in the world

Wild Country, on the Tideswell Industrial Estate, are the UK's leading manufacturer of rock-climbing equipment. Blacks Leisure Group (previous owner of Blacks and Millets before financial failure and takeover by JD Sports) was based in Duston, in the west of Northampton, and is on the Swan Valley Ind Est, near the UK & Ireland base of Levi Strauss & Co. Joules country clothing is east of Market Harborough and the Northamptonshire boundary at Dingley.

George at Asda, based at Lutterworth, in 2009 overtook M&S to become Britain's leading fashion retailer. TW Kempton are a main manufacturer of uniforms for the armed and police services opposite the National Space Centre in north Leicester; they also own the Fortis body armour and make PASGT nylon fibre helmets for troops.

=== Retail ===
Wilko head office is at Manton, Worksop; it was founded by James Kemsey Wilkinson in Leicester in 1930. In Lenton, are the head offices of Games Workshop, the producers of Warhammer miniatures. Pendragon PLC, the car dealership and the Sherwood Park industrial area is in Annesley. Sytner Group is in Enderby, a prestige car retailer. Dunelm Group, the furnishings company, is next to Lafarge in Syston; the company is named after Bill Adderley's house on Greenhill Road in Coalville; nearby is Pukka Pies. In Leicester is the nearly-defunct photographic equipment company Jessops, bought and relaunched as Jessops Europe by businessman Peter Jones and Fox's Confectionery (maker of Fox's Glacier Mints), with both on the Braunstone Frith estate. Also in Leicester are the bookmaker Mark Jarvis (next to Radio Leicester), the European HQ of National Car Rental, and Otis UK (lifts, near the National Space Centre). Jacobs is on the Meridian Business Park in Braunstone. Machine Mart is near BioCity in Nottingham. East of the Walkers plant in Beaumont Leys is Office Depot UK (and Viking Direct UK) on the Bursom Industrial Estate. Crown Crest in Belgrave owns Poundstretcher. Goldsmiths (jewellers) are based at the western end of Braunstone Frith.

In Northampton is Avon Products UK; its products reach 6 million women per week. East Midlands Railway has its head office in Derby. Porterbrook, one of the UK's three rolling stock companies is in Derby. The former East Midlands Electricity is owned by E.ON UK (supply, since Powergen bought EME in June 1998) and Western Power Distribution (distribution, who bought Central Networks in April 2011), which is based in Long Whatton and Diseworth; the area has around a 5,000 MW demand for electricity. Nearby at Castle Donington is the home of the (separate) headquarters of BMI (in Donington Hall) and bmibaby. Sixt, the car rental firm, has its UK base in Chesterfield, the base of Auto Windscreens. Booker Group, the Cash & Carry, (Happy Shopper and 2,700 Premier Stores, and famous for the Booker Prize) in Wellingborough.

Maclaren, the pushchair maker, is next to Long Buckby railway station; BabyStyle is in Sileby. There are three main distribution centres in the area at Magna Park in Leicestershire (the largest of its kind in Europe), and Brackmills and the Daventry International Railfreight Terminal in Northamptonshire. J D Wetherspoon have their main distribution centre at Daventry, and Currys (founded in Leicester in 1888 on Belgrave Gate) have theirs at Newark-on-Trent. Oxford University Press have their national distribution centre at North Kettering Business Park in Rushton). Monsoon Accessorize have their national distribution centre to the east on Octavian Park in Irchester. In Kilsby on the DIRFT estate, Tesco have their Daventry Grocery, the largest supermarket depot in the country. North of the A428 is Tesco's Clothing Distribution Centre.

=== Food processing ===
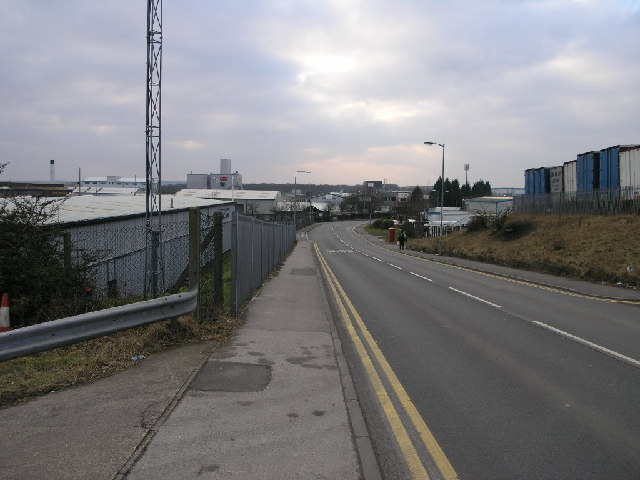
Oxo factory (former Batchelors) on the Dukeries Industrial Estate in Worksop

Silver Spoon makes all of its demerara and brown sugar at Newark-on-Trent. Swizzels Matlow makes children's confectionery in New Mills. Carlsberg has been brewed in Northampton since 1974, with twelve UK depots, and also brews Holsten Pils, and has brewed Tetley since 2011. Cott Beverages UK is in Kegworth. Greencore UK (former Derby-based Hazlewood Foods) is at Barlborough Links; its site at Manton Wood Enterprise Zone, Worksop claims to be the world's largest sandwich factory. United Biscuits has a large factory in Ashby-de-la-Zouch where it makes its KP Snacks including Hula Hoops, Skips and Nik Naks. Oxo, Saxa salt, Super Noodles, and Bisto are made by Premier Foods in the west of Worksop. Tangerine Confectionery are at Holmewood (formerly Cadbury Trebor Bassett).

Cat food such as Whiskas is made in Melton Mowbray by Masterfoods; their Waltham Centre for Pet Nutrition claims to be the world's leading authority on petfood research. Also southwest of the town next to the railway, Samworth Brothers have owned Ginsters since 1977 and Soreen since 2014, and have 8,000 UK employees. Whitworths, the food company, is in Irthlingborough; they also have a Victoria Mills flour site in Irchester.

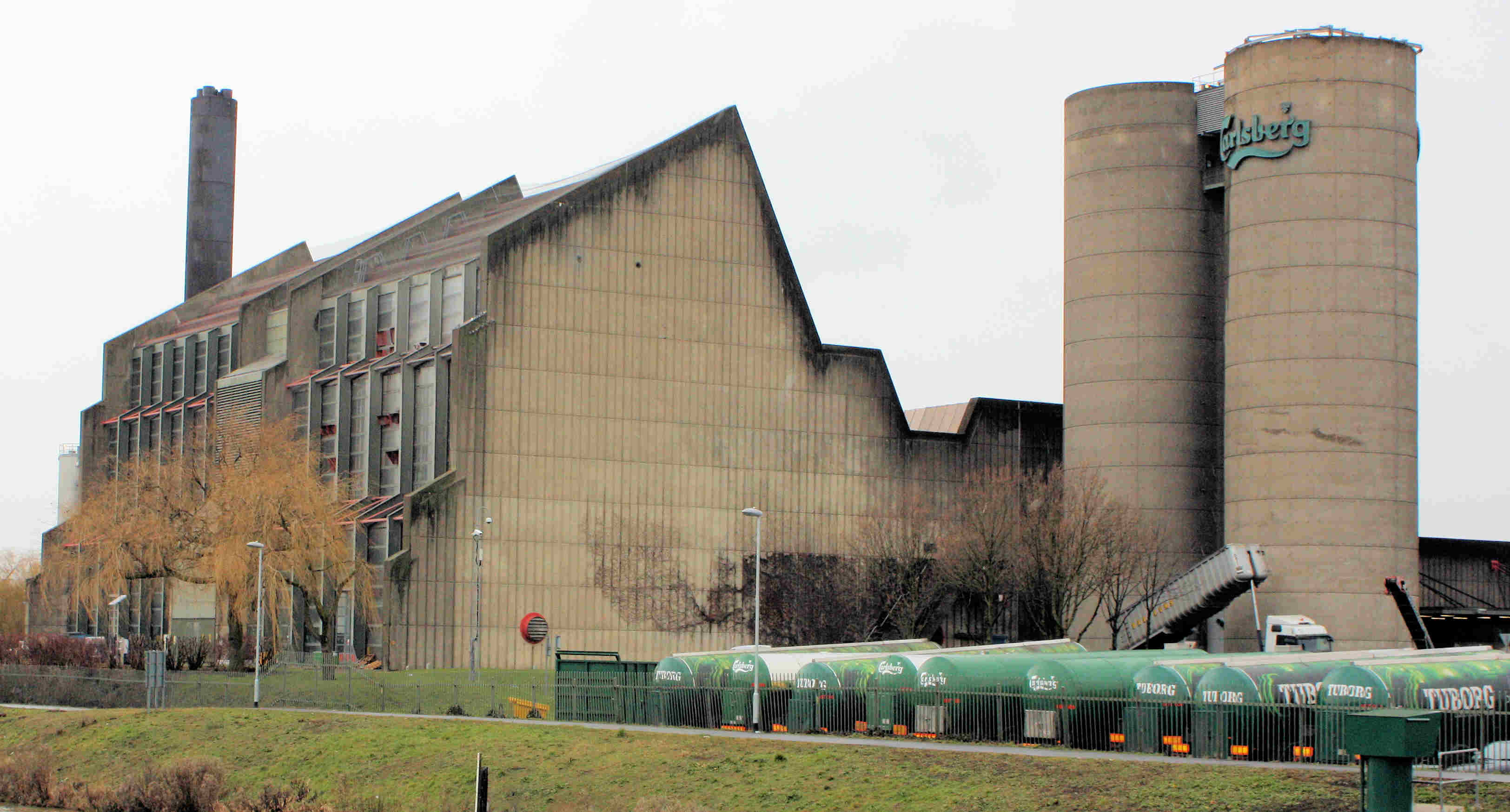
Carlsberg Brewery at the A428/A508 junction in Northampton, on the former Phipps NBC site, also bottles Tuborg and San Migiuel; all modern lagers come from a Carlsberg yeast developed in 1883.

The crisp company Walkers (owned by PepsiCo and the UK's biggest grocery brand) makes 10 million bags of crisps a day at the biggest crisp factory in the world at Beaumont Leys. Beaumont Park is PepsiCo's main research centre in the UK. Pork Farms is in Lenton, Nottingham. Thorntons is a big employer south of Alfreton in Swanwick on a former colliery, since the factory opened in 1985. At Latimer Park (Burton Latimer) is Alpro, who make soya milk products, and a huge Morrisons depot. To the west is Weetabix, which sources its wheat from a 50-mile (80 km) radius around Kettering, and also make Weetos in Corby; Ready Brek was bought from Lyons in 1990.

Long Clawson Dairy are the biggest producers of Stilton cheese in the UK; the cheese, with Shropshire Blue, is also made in Cropwell Bishop and Colston Bassett. Faccenda Group of Brackley is the second largest processor of chicken in the UK; the company also has the former Cranberry Foods site at Scropton in Derbyshire, the second biggest turkey processor in the UK after Bernard Matthews. In Wigston, Charnwood Foods (former RHM Group) make pizza bases for Pizza Hut and is owned by Premier Foods; Rossa Ice Cream is next to the Grand Union Canal and nearby is Jacob's Bakery who make 25 million biscuits a week. Délifrance UK is in north-west Wigston.

Greencore Prepared Foods on Moulton Park make half of M&S's sandwiches and sandwich filler pots. Sealord UK make all of Waitrose's white fish products near Caistor. Kettleby Foods, part of Samworth Brothers, make most of Tesco's ready meals in Melton Mowbray. PAS (Grantham) (owned by McCain) make chips at Easton. Isoma of Swadlincote makes food handling equipment; Interlevin Refrigeration at Castle Donington is near the M&S distribution centre; Parry Catering and Fabrication in Draycott make catering appliances and equipment.

Roquette (former ABF-owned ABR Foods) produce starch and bioethanol at Corby near RS Components, and a Morrisons frozen-food depot is near Weldon. Opposite Charles Lawrence in Newark, Laurens Patisseries (owned by Bakkavör UK) are Europe's largest manufacturer of cream cakes. Kerry Ingredients make Homepride flour in Gainsborough.

=== Health care ===
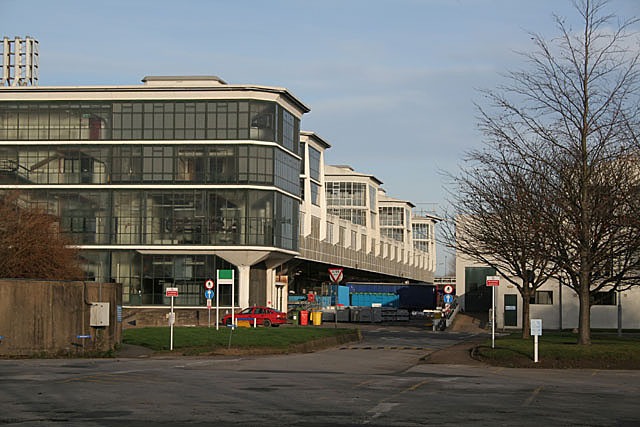
Sir Owen Williams D10 building at Boots

Boots UK is based in Lenton in Nottingham, with 2,500 UK stores, where Stewart Adams developed Ibuprofen in the 1960s on Rutland Road in West Bridgford, and Vision Express are nearby. Boots was the biggest chemist chain in the world; A.S. Watson Group is the world's biggest health retail company. Crookes Healthcare, formerly Boots and later Reckitt Benckiser, make Strepsils and Optrex, and Boots Contract Manufacturing (BCM) make products for other firms; it makes Benylin for McNeil. On the ng2 business park, Specsavers have their corporate eyecare and contact lens division. Three out of the four main UK opticians are sited in Nottingham. The MRI scanner was developed at the University of Nottingham by Sir Peter Mansfield; MRI scanners were developed mainly by GEC Medical; MRI is based on nuclear magnetic resonance (NMR) of the hydrogen nucleus; Raymond Vahan Damadian of the USA also claims invention of MRI.

Queen's Medical Centre (QMC) is one of the largest teaching hospitals in Europe, and the largest hospital in the UK. The CT scanner (X-ray computed tomography) was invented by Newark's Sir Godfrey Hounsfield. Both inventions received Nobel Prizes for Medicine (2003 for MRI and 1979 for CT). Glenfield Hospital (under the UHL NHS Trust) is one of England's main hospitals for coronary care and respiratory diseases; it has a strong international reputation for medical research in cardiac and respiratory health and carried out the world's first percutaneous coronary intervention on a two-year-old child in August 2012 with the largest ECMO unit in the UK.

EMAS is based in Bilborough. There are three (charity-funded) air ambulance services: the western one is based at EMA, the eastern one is based at RAF Waddington, and the southern one (shared with Warwickshire) is at Coventry Airport. NHS East Midlands is at Sandiacre. 3M Health Care (former Riker Laboratories) has a factory in the north of Loughborough with its head office next to the railway station.

BioCity Nottingham is an important centre for cutting-edge bioscience. Slimming World, who help people lose weight, is in Pinxton, near Alfreton; on the other side of the railway NHS Supply Chain was formed in 2006 in Somercotes; nearby Diversey UK (formerly JohnsonDiversey) has a manufacturing plant, and is at Weston Favell. Dalatek Plastics make pharmaceutical containers on the Maun Valley Ind Park at Sutton in Ashfield next to the railway.

=== High technology ===
Belkin UK (and Linksys) UK is in Rushden, Misco is in Wellingborough, and RS Components is in Corby. Pegasus Software, producer of well-known accounting software, is in the south of Kettering. Serif Europe is in West Bridgford; Serif developed PagePlus in the 1990s which was the first low-cost DTP software. AVG Technologies has its UK head office on Newark's industrial estate. Experian have a large data centre at Fairham House south of Ruddington, with two others in Texas and Brazil. The Ruddington site is connected by a 640 Gbps dark fibre and runs on IBM's z10 with Tivoli. Inter-Activa is at the LCB Depot in Leicester city centre.

Nexor is in Nottingham. Entalysis, a business performance management software company, is located in Burton upon trent town centre. Amphenol Jaybeam in the west of Wellingborough makes cellular telephone base station antennas. Texas Instruments UK have their Semiconductor Design Centre at Northampton, formerly in Bedford from 1957 to 2005. GE Sensing UK is at Groby. Oclaro UK (formerly Bookham), at Caswell Research Centre in Greens Norton makes indium phosphide wafers and researches photonic integrated circuits and DSDBR tunable lasers.

=== Finance ===
In 2023, the financial services sector accounted for 3.5% of the East Midland's GDP compared to 8.8% of the UK's GDP.

Since 1997 Capital One, the Virginia-based credit card company, has had its European HQ at Trent House in Nottingham's city centre in a former Boots UK printing works next to the railway station since 2009 have taken over the company's Loxley House next door as their HQ. Dublin-based Experian, one of two UK credit-referencing companies, was founded in the city in 1980 (owned by GUS until 2006) and has a large UK HQ to its south west, near the River Trent. TDX Group in Nottingham, is owned by Equifax. Santander (former Alliance & Leicester) is based in Narborough. Barclaycard is headquartered in Northampton, and Nationwide has a large administrative centre at Moulton Park. Egg Banking was on Pride Park in Derby, until Barclays closed the site in 2011, and moved the business to its Northampton credit card site.

Castle Meadow Campus is the name of a large HMRC site in Nottingham, being the national arm of HMRC that looks after the Enterprise Investment Scheme, Corporate Venturing Scheme, Venture capital trusts, and Enterprise Management Incentives, HMRC's Pension Schemes Services, and the Residency department, which deals with Double taxation Treaties and inheritance tax. It has the Valuation Office Agency for the East Midlands and East of England. Royal Mail have a main administrative centre at Rowland Hill House, opposite the Queen's Park Sports Centre in Chesterfield (HR, pensions, and Vehicle Services). Royal Mail have their National Distribution Centre at Crick. The Bank of England's MPC Agency for the East Midlands is near Experian and its economic data.

NatWest Group has a documents centre (Williams Lea) in Shepshed, where it prints its statements for England and Wales. Orion Security Print, north of Stanton steel works in Ilkeston, produces Odeon cinema tickets and library cards. An office of RR Donnelley west of South Wigston, next to the railway, deals with all of Barclaycard's mail. Barclaycard have their Payment Acceptance Centre in Northampton.

=== Rural ===
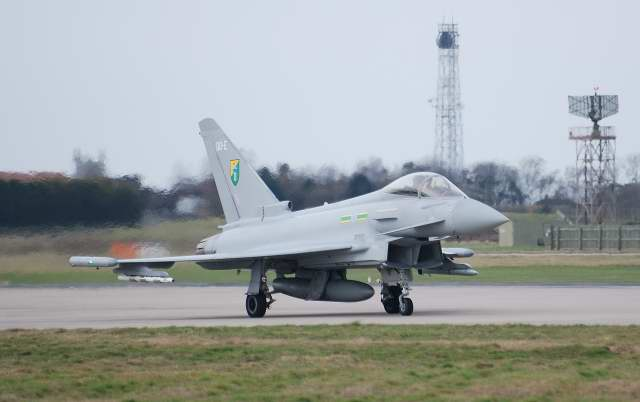
The Eurofighter Typhoon is based at RAF Coningsby; it will eventually carry the active electronically scanned array (AESA) radar, which enables the radar to distinguish between targets and background noise, which earlier radars could not.

Lincolnshire and Rutland are very agricultural, with much of the UK's arable crops grown in this area. The RAF have many bases in this area, with the main RAF College at Cranwell near Sleaford; the East Midlands Universities Air Squadron is at Cranwell, also home of the Eastern Region of the Sea Cadet Corps, and the Officer and Aircrew Selection Centre. The RAF's six AWACS aircraft are at RAF Waddington. 16th Regiment Royal Artillery is in Rutland.

After Norfolk, Lincolnshire is the second largest potato producer in the country, and grows 30% of the country's vegetables. Interflora has its UK HQ in Sleaford; Lincolnshire is the world's leading producer of daffodils (narcissus family); 40% of the flowers bought in the UK are grown there; Butters Group supply many bulbs (Amaryllis) from Low Fulney. The county produces each year enough sugar beet for 350 million bags of sugar and enough wheat for 250 million loaves. Fowler-Welch Coolchain are based in Spalding, as is Bakkavör (formerly Geest) which is the UK's largest provider of fresh prepared foods.

Princes (formerly Premier Foods) have a large operation in Little Sutton near Long Sutton canning vegetables with Fray Bentos meat, and Batchelors peas. Magnadata Group in Boston have the contract for the UK's rail tickets (for ATOC); the orange-style tickets have been in operation since 1990. Silver Spoon's Bardney plant makes the market-leading Askey's dessert toppings. John Deere have their UK base at Langar on the Nottinghamshire/Leicestershire boundary. The British Geological Survey is in Keyworth. Weatherbys in Wellingborough administer the British horseracing industry, having produced the General Stud Book since 1791.

=== Entertainment ===
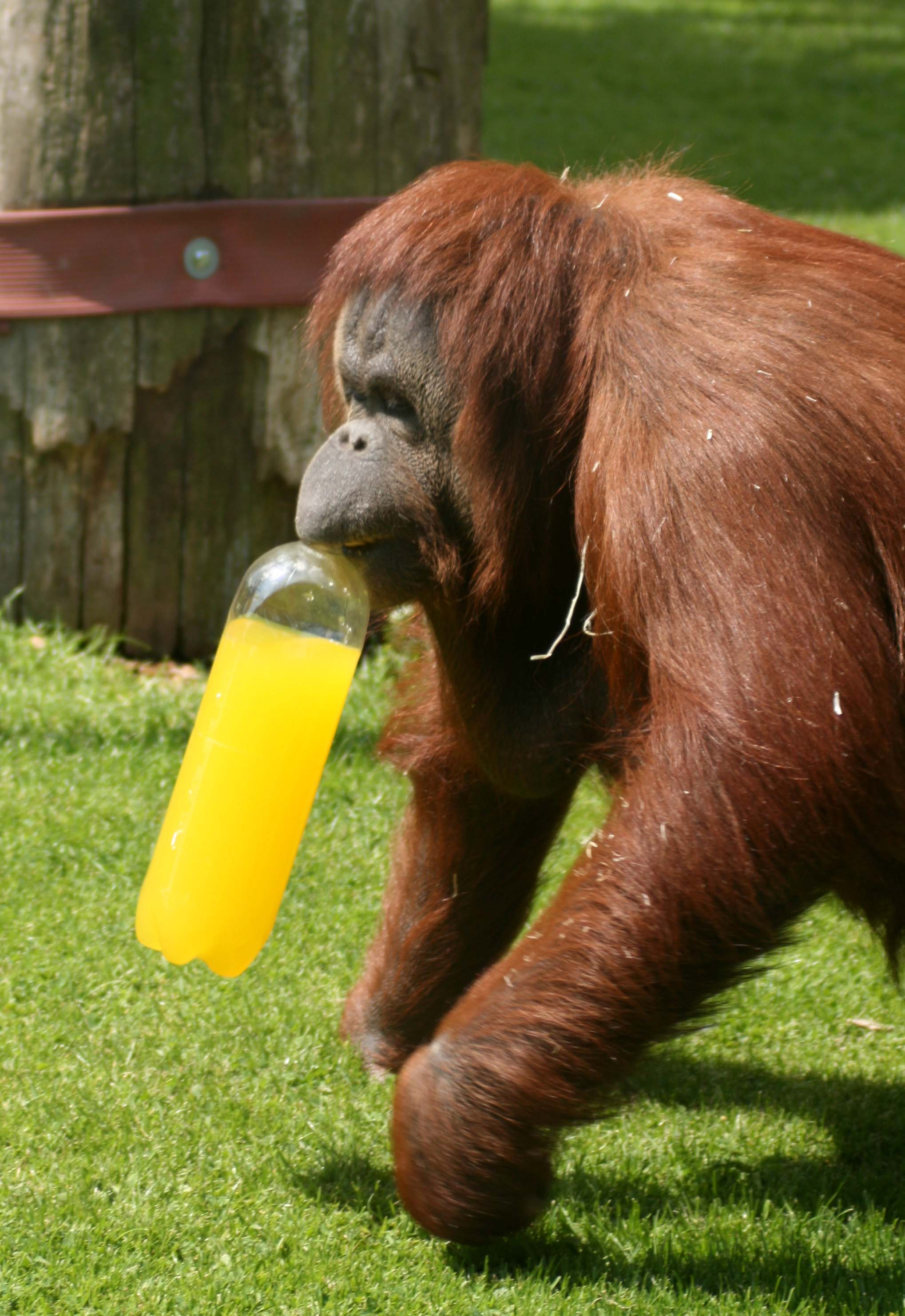
An orangutan at Twycross Zoo

Skegness and the Lincolnshire coast provides seaside entertainment for many in the East Midlands with its Butlins 200-acre resort at Ingoldmells. Nottingham and Leicester are both popular night time destinations.

Center Parcs UK opened their first leisure facility at the Sherwood Holiday Village site at Rufford, near Ollerton, together with their headquarters and call centre in Sherwood Energy Village business park, built upon the former Ollerton Colliery site in Ollerton, Nottinghamshire.

The YHA is based in Matlock. Gala Bingo is based in Nottingham; Coral have over 1,800 UK shops. Twycross Zoo is just south of Measham in Leicestershire, and the National Space Centre is in Belgrave in north Leicester. Carlsbro (electronics and speakers) are at South Normanton. Peavey Electronics UK (loudspeakers), are southwest of Corby.

Rockingham Motor Speedway is in Corby, and other racetracks include Donington Park and Mallory Park in Leicestershire, and Cadwell Park in Lincolnshire. Silverstone Circuit hosts the British Grand Prix, although the southern half of the track is outside the region. Rutland Water is popular for sailing, fishing and bird-watching. The Peak District National Park became the first national park in the United Kingdom in 1951.

== Education ==
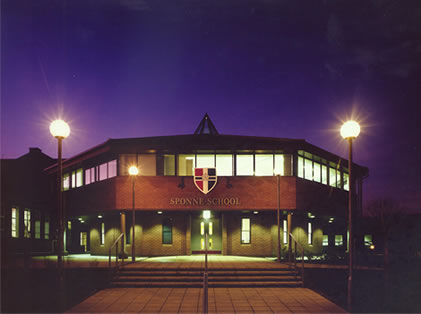
Sponne School, in Towcester

=== Secondary education ===
Most secondary schools in the East Midlands are comprehensives, although Lincolnshire retains fifteen state grammar schools.

There are around 180,000 students in the region's secondary schools; this is the second lowest number of students in a region in England, after the North East, and more than 100,000 lower than the figure for the West Midlands. Some of the East Midlands' urban secondary schools hold truancy rates above that of the national average, whereas truancy rates in the region's rural secondary schools tend to be lower than the national average.

Nottingham City schools tend to perform less well in terms of GCSE standards, with some Leicester schools suffering a similar problem. Rutland (amongst the highest-performing areas in the region where GCSE standards are concerned) has one of the highest percentages of pupils reaching the threshold of five grade A–C GCSEs (including Maths and English) in England. On a District Council level, Rushcliffe in Nottinghamshire tends to attain some of the region's best GCSE results. Leicestershire and Derbyshire also regularly tend to produce GCSE results at a standard greater than the national average.

At A-level, Nottinghamshire, Lincolnshire and Derbyshire regularly generate results greater than the national average. Nottingham tends to produce better results at A-level than it does at GCSE.

There are eighteen further education colleges in the region, including: New College Nottingham, Central College Nottingham, Leicester College, and Lincoln College.

The regional Learning and Skills Council was headquartered at the Meridian Business Park in Braunstone Town, southwest of Leicester. The LSC has been replaced by the Young People's Learning Agency, and the Skills Funding Agency.

=== Universities ===
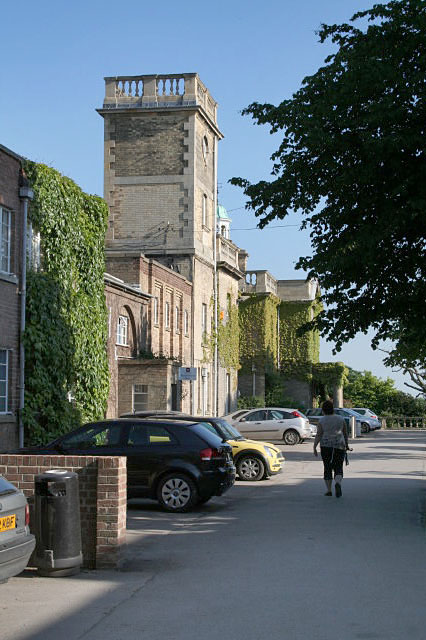
Brackenhurst Hall – Nottingham Trent University's agricultural college in Southwell

The East Midlands' universities include:

- University of Nottingham: The region's largest university by student population, with around 33,000 students. The university is often ranked in the British top seven for research power. It is famous for its academic reputation, consistently ranking highly in university league tables. It is the only Russell Group university in the East Midlands. The university has produced several Nobel Prize winners.
- Loughborough University: In addition to its more traditional academic work, Loughborough University is well-regarded for its sporting heritage. One notable sporting alumna is British gold-medallist Paula Radcliffe. The British Olympic athletics team trained at the university as part of their preparations for the 2012 Summer Olympics. The adidas Jabulani football, the official football for the 2010 World Cup, was designed in the university's Sports Technology Institute.
- Nottingham Trent University: Nottingham Trent University is the East Midlands' second largest university (and one of the largest universities in the United Kingdom), with a student population of approximately 24,000.
- University of Leicester: The university has established itself as a leading research-led university and has been named University of the Year of 2008 by the Times Higher Education. The University of Leicester is also the only university ever to have won a Times Higher Education award in seven consecutive years. The university is most famous for the invention of genetic fingerprinting DNA, the discovery of the remains of King Richard III and Space research. It houses Europe's biggest academic centre for space research, in which space probes have been built, most notably the Mars Lander Beagle 2, which was built in collaboration with the Open University. It is a founding partner of the National Space Centre which is based in Leicester.
- De Montfort University: The region's third largest university. It is a public research and teaching university. The university has one of the largest numbers of Teacher Fellows of any UK university and was awarded Centre of Excellence status for its performance practice teaching and student support
- University of Northampton: The only university in Northamptonshire, with two campuses in Northampton and a developing partnership with Silverstone.
- University of Derby: Formerly a centre and college for teacher training, Derby University works closely with businesses of the area with its University of Derby–Corporate programme and has a history of academics dating back to 1851.
- University of Lincoln: An English university founded in 1992, with origins tracing back to the foundation and association with the Hull School of Art 1861.
- Lincoln Bishop University: The newest university in the East Midlands, formerly a university college.

The region has the lowest proportion of part-time students in England. The region has a higher influx of young people into the region at the university stage than out of the region into other regions' universities. Only 25% of the region's students undertaking a first degree are native to the region.

== Sports ==
The region has a sporting tradition, with some of the most well-known sports personalities –- David Gower (Leicestershire C.C.C.), Gary Lineker, Rory Underwood (Leicester Tigers) and Jonathan Agnew.

The British Gliding Association is based in Leicester on Meridian Business Park, in Braunstone. The National Ice Skating Association is based in Nottingham (and many of Britain's Olympic ice skaters train in Nottingham); Nottingham Panthers are in the Elite Ice Hockey League. The British Caving Association is at Great Hucklow, the UK sports governing body. The British Canoe Union is in Bingham.

The first 1978 BDO World Darts Championship was held in Nottingham, in February 1978, being largely the idea of Nick Hunter, a BBC sports producer, and the event first introduced Sid Waddell.

=== Football ===
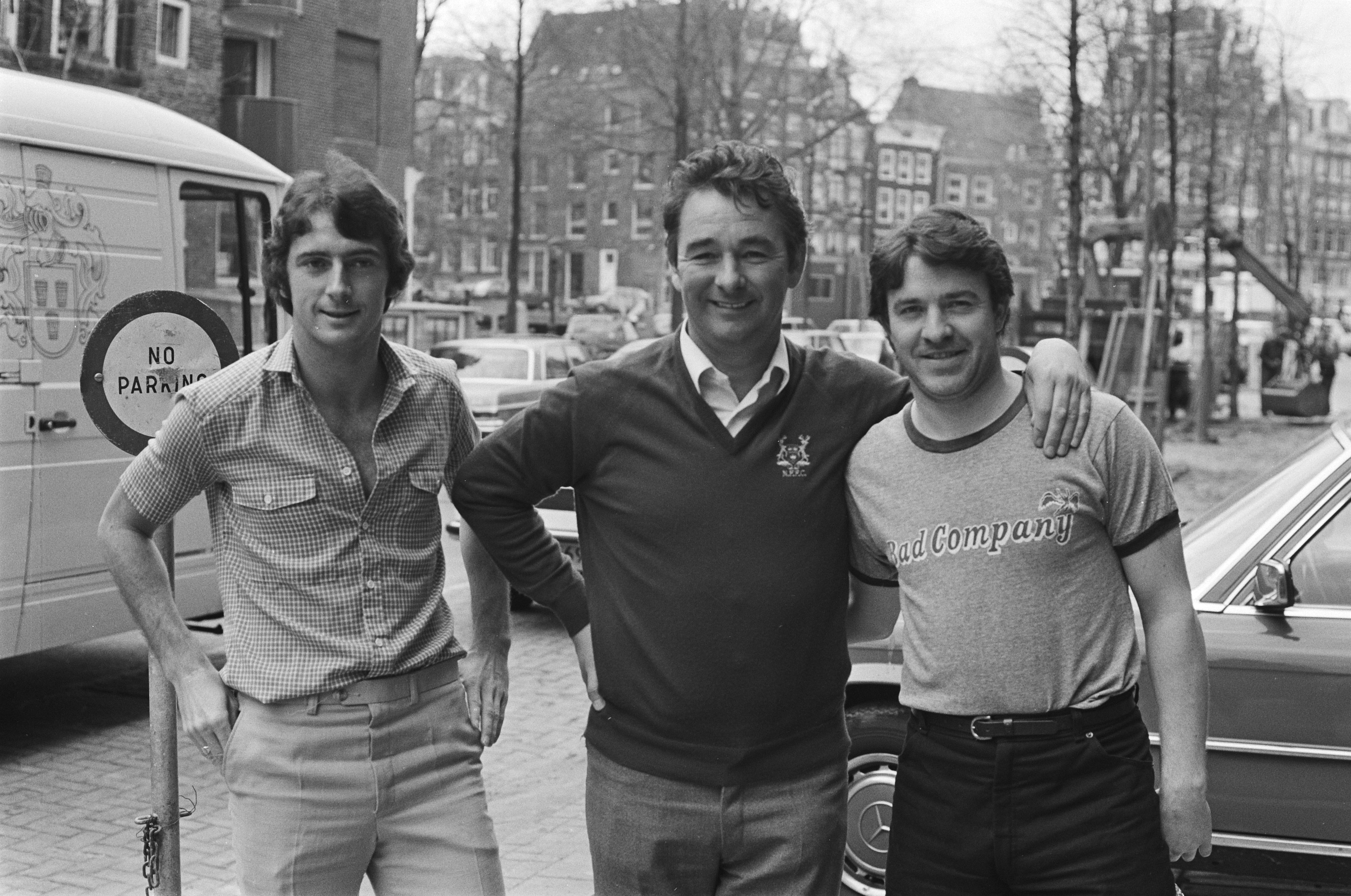
Brian Clough in April 1980

Notts County F.C. is the world's oldest professional football club, with Nottingham Forest F.C. being the oldest football league side after Notts County's relegation to the National League in 2019. Sam Weller Widdowson brought in shin pads in 1874. The first referee's whistle was at Nottingham in 1872.

Admiral Sportswear at Wigston in Leicestershire made the England football strip from 1974 to 1982, when the company went bankrupt; in 1974 it was the first company to introduce replica kits. Umbro took over the England kit after the 1982 World Cup in 1984. Nike make the England kit today.

The East Midlands is home to several professional and semi-professional association football (soccer) clubs.

Team	Location	League 2025–26
Leicester City	Leicester	Championship
Nottingham Forest	West Bridgford	Premier League
Derby County	Derby	Championship
Lincoln City	Lincoln	League One
Mansfield Town	Mansfield	League One
Northampton Town	Northampton	League One
Chesterfield	Chesterfield	League Two
Notts County	Nottingham	League Two
Alfreton Town	Alfreton	National League North
Boston United	Boston	National League
Buxton	Buxton	National League North
Brackley Town	Brackley	National League

=== Rugby Union ===
The East Midlands is home to two top-tier (Aviva Premiership) clubs.

Leicester Tigers are an English rugby union club based in Leicester at the Welford Road stadium and play in the Aviva Premiership. They were formed in 1880; their colours are green, burgundy and white. Leicester Tigers are one of the most successful Rugby Union teams in Europe and the most successful English club since the introduction of league rugby in 1987, having won the European Cup twice, the first tier of English rugby ten times, and the Anglo-Welsh Cup seven times.

Northampton Saints are a professional rugby union club from Northampton, England. They were formed in 1880, and play in black, green, and gold colours. The team play their home games at Franklin's Gardens, which has a capacity of 15,500. Their biggest rivals are Leicester Tigers.

=== Cricket ===
Nottinghamshire (Trent Bridge), Leicestershire (Grace Road), Derbyshire (County Cricket Ground, Derby) and Northamptonshire (County Cricket Ground, Northampton) are in the Cricket T20 North group; Northamptonshire was formerly in the Midlands group.

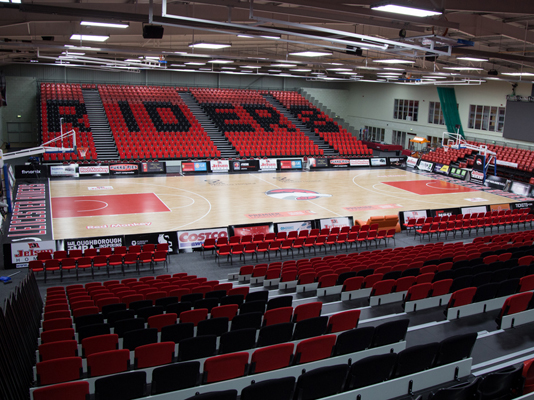
Leicester Riders arena in September 2016

=== Basketball ===
Leicester Riders, who play at Leicester Arena, are the oldest club in British basketball, founded in 1967.

=== Motor sports ===
RML Group (Ray Mallock) BTCC and WTCC motorsport team is in Wellingborough, next to the UK HQ of Vredestein tyres (Dutch). Craft-Bamboo Racing WTCC are at Silverstone.

=== Swimming ===
The Amateur Swimming Association is the world's first swimming governing body, founded 1869, and based in Loughborough. British Swimming have one of its three Intensive Training Centres at Loughborough University's Loughborough Pool in their Sport Development Centre.

== Local media ==
=== Television ===
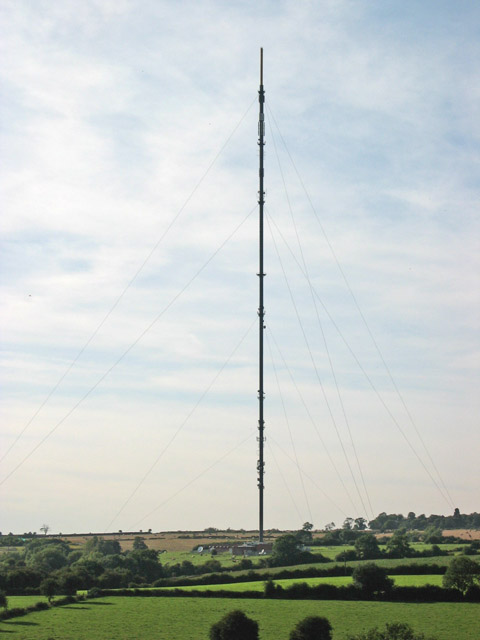
The Waltham on the Wolds transmitter covers large parts of the region.

The BBC East Midlands region of BBC Television, based in Nottingham, produces several regional television programmes including the news programme East Midlands Today, broadcast from Waltham transmitting station. This excludes most of Northamptonshire, north Nottinghamshire and north Derbyshire. s Most of Lincolnshire is covered by the BBC Yorkshire and Lincolnshire's Look North and ITV Yorkshire's Calendar South, both broadcast from Belmont transmitting station. North Nottinghamshire, northeast Derbyshire, the eastern High Peak and northern Derbyshire Dales are covered by BBC Yorkshire's Look North and ITV Yorkshire's Calendar North, both broadcast from Emley Moor transmitting station. The western area of the High Peak is covered by BBC North West and ITV Granada from Winter Hill transmitting station.

ITV News Central East covers much of the East Midlands, broadcasting from ITV Central's Birmingham studios. Some western parts of the region can receive ITV News Central West.

Most of Northamptonshire is part of the BBC East and ITV Anglia region, which broadcast Look East and ITV News Anglia respectively from Sandy Heath transmitting station. Southern parts of Northamptonshire receive the Thames Valley micro-region of ITV Meridian and South Today.

Midlands Asian Television, based in Leicester, caters to the area's large South Asian population.

=== Radio ===
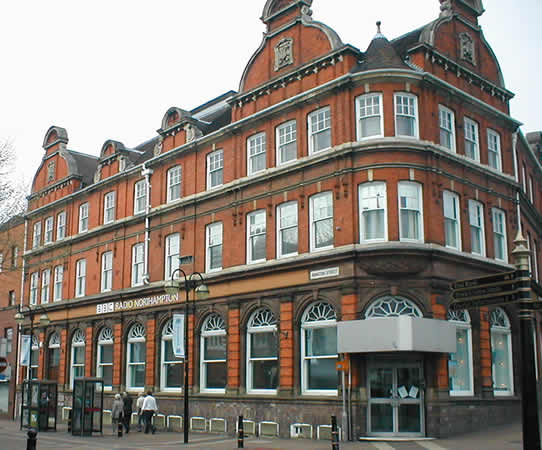
Radio Northampton's Broadcasting House

- BBC Radio Derby, BBC Radio Leicester, BBC Radio Lincolnshire, BBC Radio Northampton, BBC Radio Nottingham, BBC Radio Manchester (for Glossop, Whaley Bridge and Chapel-en-le-Frith) and BBC Radio Sheffield (for Chesterfield, Bolsover, Worksop and Retford). BBC Radio Leicester was the first local radio station in the United Kingdom.
- Many commercial, student and community radio stations: Capital Midlands (formerly Trent FM, RAM FM and Leicester Sound), Hits Radio East Midlands (formerly Gem and Heart 106), Heart East (Northamptonshire) (formerly Northants 96), Demon FM (Leicester), Peak FM (Chesterfield and North Derbyshire), Hits Radio Lincolnshire (Lincolnshire and Newark-on-Trent), Takeover Radio (Leicester & Nottingham), Fosse 107 (Loughborough and Hinckley), Harborough FM, The Eye (Melton Mowbray), Greatest Hits Radio Stamford and Rutland (formerly Rutland Radio), Boundary Sound (Newark-on-Trent), Mansfield 103.2 FM, Greatest Hits Radio South Yorkshire (formerly Trax FM) (Bassetlaw), Ashbourne Radio (Ashbourne on 96.7FM & 101.8FM Wirksworth & Ecclesbourne Valley), Amber Sound FM, Erewash Sound, High Peak Radio (Chapel-en-le-Frith), Smooth East Midlands (formerly Connect 97.2 & 106.80, Corby, PCR FM 103.20, Kettering & Wellingborough), Sabras Radio, Salaam Radio, and Hindu Sanskar Radio, URN (Uni of Nottingham), Fly FM (Nottingham Trent Uni), Leicester Community Radio Local Radio for over 35's in Leicester 1449AM.
- National radio on DAB and FM comes from Sutton Coldfield transmitting station in the west, Belmont transmitting station (the tallest structure in the region) in the northeast, and Holme Moss in the northwest.

=== Newspapers ===
There are a number of daily newspapers, the largest of which include the Derby Telegraph, Derbyshire Times, Leicester Mercury, Lincolnshire Echo, Northampton Chronicle and Echo, and Nottingham Evening Post. Most of the daily papers are owned by Trinity Mirror.

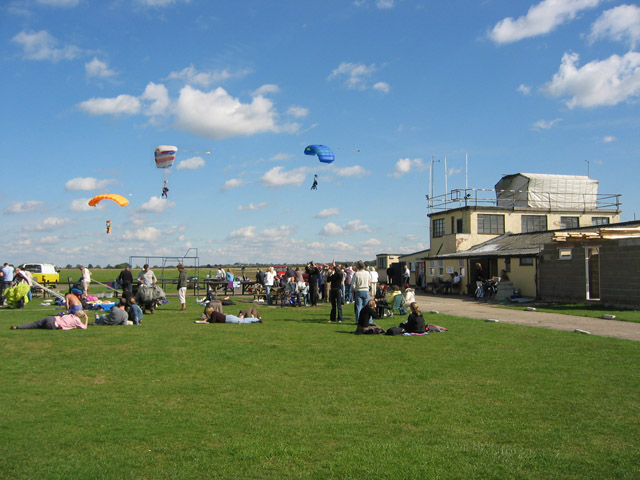
British Parachute Schools at Langar

=== Magazines ===
There are many regional lifestyle publications, the largest and most widely read being Life&Style Magazine, FHP Magazine, Nottinghamshire Life and City Life and County Living. National magazine publishers in the region include Key Publishing, Mortons of Horncastle and Bourne Publishing Group.

== See also ==
- Midlands
- 1185 East Midlands earthquake
- East Midlands Regional Select Committee
- List of schools in the East Midlands
- Scouting in the East Midlands
- South Midlands, a name for the southern part of the East Midlands.
