= Tythrop Park =

Manor house in Kingsey, Buckinghamshire, England

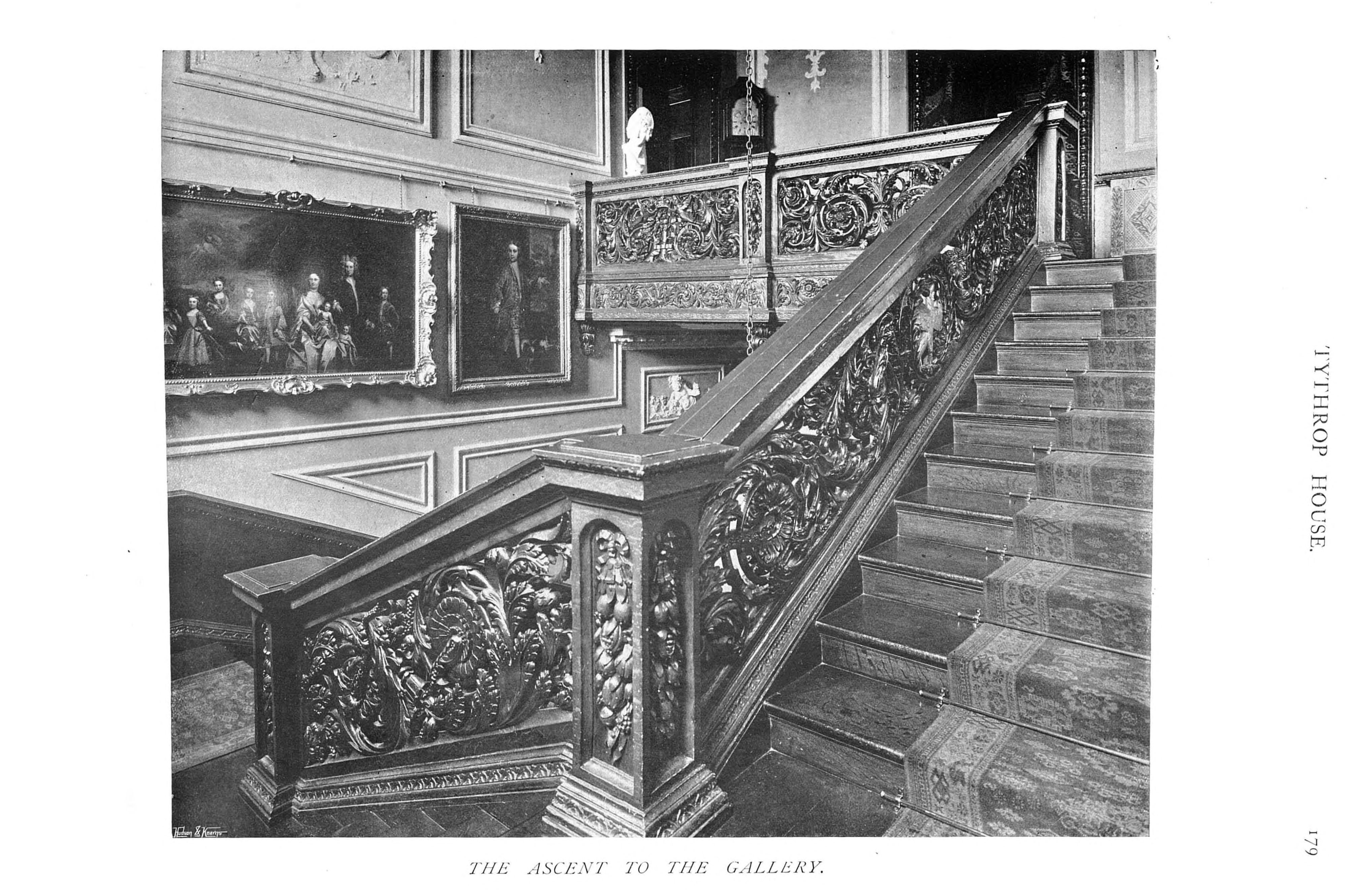
- The staircase in Tythrop Park

- Location within Buckinghamshire
- 51°45′25″N 0°55′48″W
- Type: Manor House
- Location: Kingsey
- OS grid reference: SP 73951 07014

History
- Built: 17th century

Site notes
- Area: Buckinghamshire
- Owner: Nicholas Wheeler and Chrissie Rucker

Listed Building – Grade I
- Official name: Tythrop House
- Designated: 26 August 1949
- Reference no.: 1159819

Tythrop Park, also known as Tythrop House, is a Grade I listed 17th-century manor house, set in 51 acres (21 ha) of parkland, in Kingsey, Buckinghamshire, England. According to Nikolaus Pevsner the exterior is plain and unpromising, but inside the house he describes the staircase as one of the finest in the county, with "extremely luscious openwork foliage".

The property is noted as having installed an early duck decoy, similar to that at the Boarstall Duck Decoy.

It was owned by the barrister and peer Jonathan Marks, Baron Marks of Henley-on-Thames from 1998 to 2007, when it was bought for £12.5 million by Nicholas Wheeler (founder of mail-order shirt company Charles Tyrwhitt), and Chrissie Rucker (founder of The White Company). The couple renovated the property before moving in with their four children.
