= Thomas Pink =

British clothing company

Thomas Pink Shirtmaker Limited
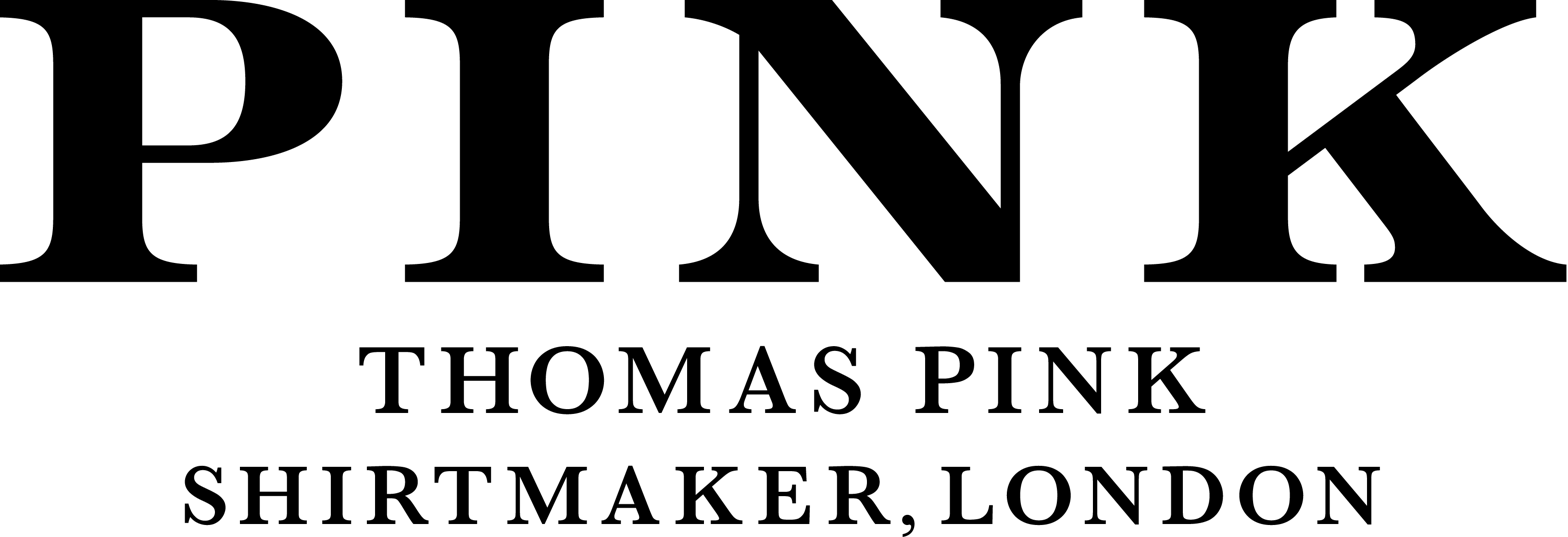
- Trade name: Thomas Pink
- Company type: Private limited company
- Industry: Clothing
- Founded: 1984; 42 years ago
- Founders: James, Peter and John Mullen
- Headquarters: London, United Kingdom
- Products: Menswear and accessories
- Website: thomaspink.com

Thomas Pink is a British clothing company that sells men's shirts, as well as other menswear and accessories. It was established in London in 1984 by three Irish brothers. From 1999 to 2021, it was owned by LVMH. The company was acquired in 2024 by Icon Luxury Group and CP Brands Group.

== History ==
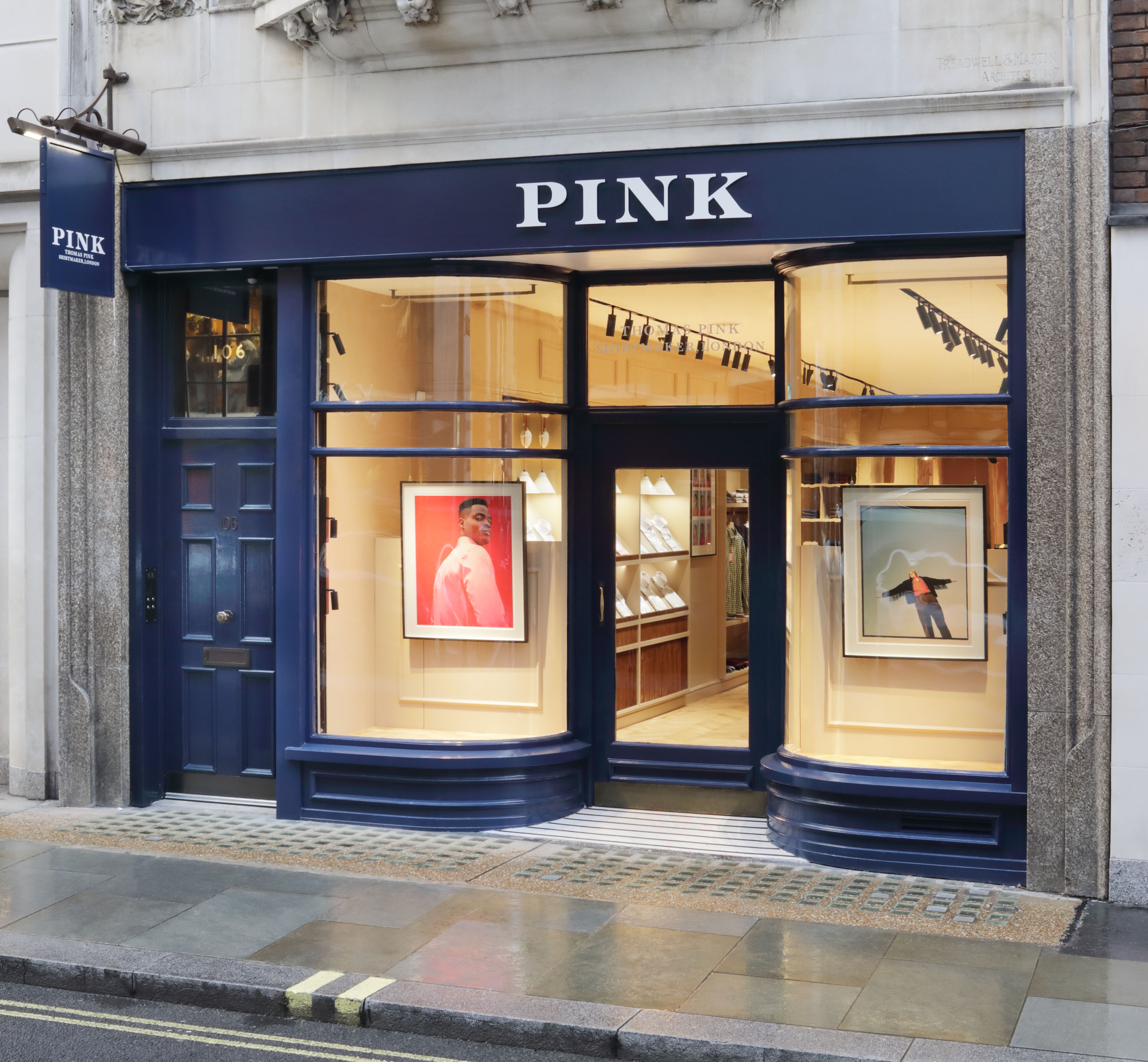
Store on Jermyn Street in London, 2022

The company was founded in 1984 by three Irish brothers – James, Peter and John Mullen. It was named after Thomas Pink, an eighteenth-century tailor in Mayfair, London.

In 1999, it was sold to French conglomerate LVMH, which paid about €48 million for 70% of the company. At that time, the company had 20 shops, including 17 in the UK, one in Dublin and two in the United States. LVMH bought the remaining 30% of the company in 2003.

In 2012, Thomas Pink launched legal proceedings in the UK against Victoria's Secret, which was marketing lingerie under the label "Pink". Thomas Pink claimed that Victoria's Secret was infringing on its trademarks, confusing customers and tarnishing its image, pursuant to the Trade Marks Act 1994. Although Victoria's Secret attempted to raise a number of defences, including revocation for non-use, and attacked the validity of the marks for descriptiveness and lack of distinctiveness, High Court of England and Wales judge Colin Birss ruled in Thomas Pink's favour in July 2014. Victoria's Secret, which is owned by L Brands, is making efforts to protect its trademarks in the United States, where the British trademark ruling did not have any effect.

In 2018, the company made an operating loss of £23.5 million. In November 2018, it changed its name to Pink Shirtmaker. The company closed its Jermyn Street shop in August 2020; in December of that year, it closed down its other shops, its website and its social media activity. Its dissolution was partially attributed to the COVID-19 pandemic.

In February 2021, Nick Preston, a former JD Sports executive, made arrangements to acquire the brand and its intellectual property from LVMH, though not its retail storefronts. The brand resumed trading in November of that year.

In December 2024, Thomas Pink was acquired by Icon Luxury Group and CP Brands in a joint venture.

== See also ==
- Charles Tyrwhitt
- Hawes & Curtis
- Hilditch & Key
- Turnbull & Asser
