= Bea and her Business =

English singer-songwriter (born 2004)

Bea
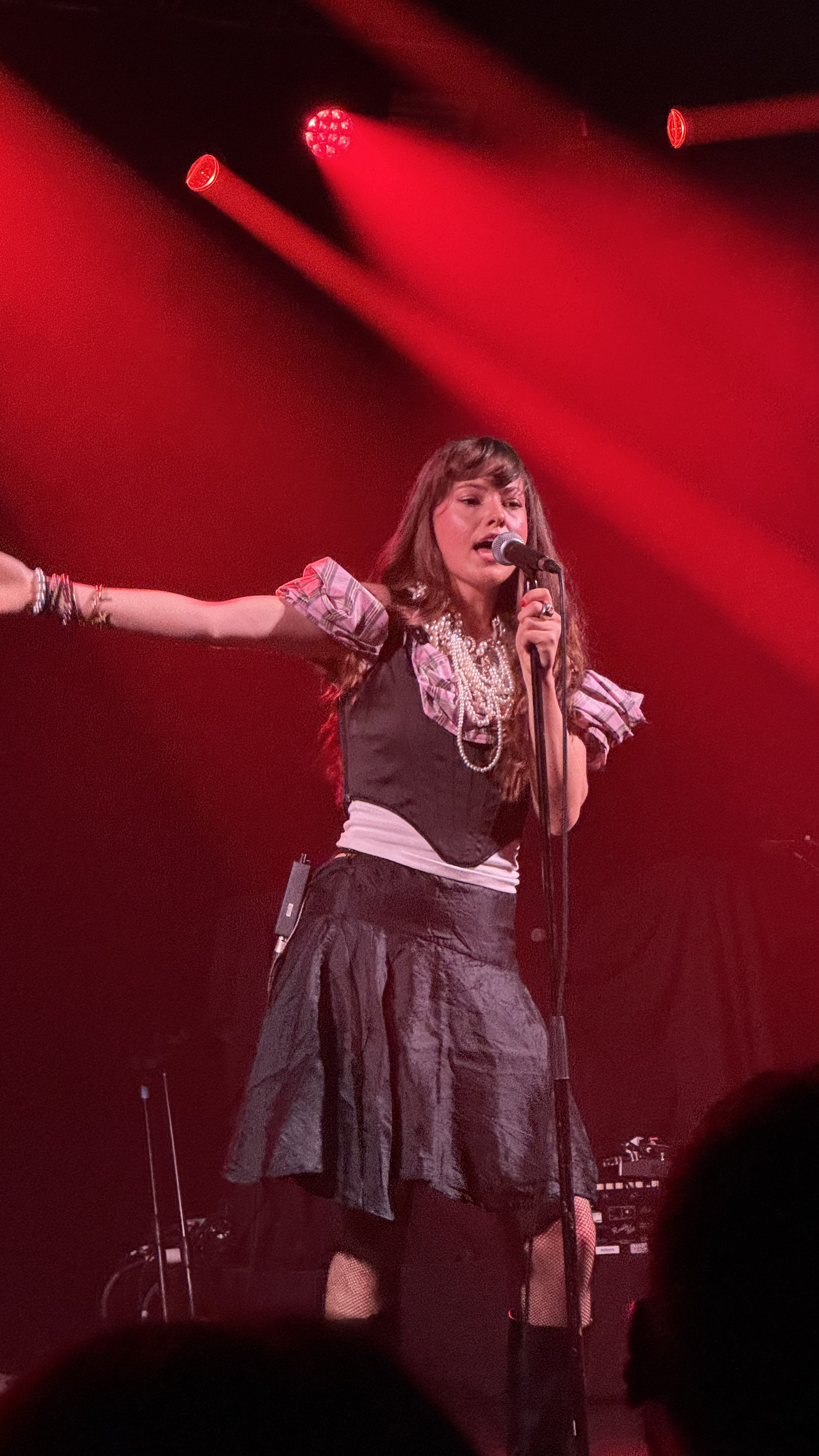
- Wheeler performing in 2025
- Born: Bea Alexandra McArthur Wheeler; 20 February 2004 (age 22)
- Occupations: Singer; songwriter
- Years active: 2023–present
- Parents: Nick Wheeler (father); Chrissie Rucker (mother)
- Musical career
- Origin: Oxfordshire, England
- Genre: Pop
- Instruments: Vocals, piano
- Label: Warner UK
- Website: www.beaandher.business

Bea Alexandra McArthur Wheeler (born 20 February 2004), known professionally as Bea and previously known as Bea and her Business, is an English singer-songwriter. She rose to prominence with her single "Born to Be Alive" in 2023.

== Early life ==
Wheeler grew up in the "outskirts of Oxfordshire". She is the daughter of Nick Wheeler, founder of Charles Tyrwhitt clothes retail business, and Chrissie Rucker, founder of The White Company. She has two older sisters. Wheeler attended the private school Dragon School in Oxford, and the private school Wellington College in Sandhurst.

== Career ==
Wheeler started posting videos of cover songs on TikTok when she was 16, such as Lana Del Rey's "Summertime Sadness" and Lukas Graham's "7 Years", under the name Beebs Music, then under Bea and Her Bizness, before evolving to Bea and Her Business. In 2023, at the age of 19, Wheeler signed a deal with Warner Music UK. She teamed up with Oh Wonder's Anthony Vander West and Josephine Vander West to write the EP's songs.

In 2024, she again teamed up with Anthony and Josephine Vander West on the writing and production of her new EP, Me vs. Me. Several different songwriters, such as Andrew Jackson, Eg White and Sara Boe also participated in the writing of songs. In 2025, she was nominated for Rising Star at The Ivors Academy.

In 2026, her single Rich, which she released the year before, was featured in the first episode of the television series Off Campus.

== Discography ==
=== Compilation albums ===
Title	Details
Bea and her Business	Released: 13 February 2026; Label: Warner; Formats: Streaming, digital download

=== Extended plays ===
Title	Details
Introverted Extrovert	Released: 3 November 2023; Label: Warner; Formats: Streaming, digital download
Me vs. Me	Released: 24 May 2024; Label: Warner; Formats: Streaming, digital download

=== Singles ===
Title	Year	Album
"Born to Be Alive"	2023	Introverted Extrovert
"All the Boys"	2023	Introverted Extrovert
"Me Against My Head"	2023	Me vs. Me
"Wow"	2024	Me vs. Me
"Good Things"	2024	Me vs. Me
"Sunburnt Shoulders"	2024	Me vs. Me
"Safety Net" (solo or with Sarah Toscano)	2024	Bea and her Business
"The Scientist"	2024	Bea and her Business
"We're Not the Same"	2025	Bea and her Business
"Rich"	2025	Bea and her Business
"Can't Help Falling Out of Love"	2026	TBA
"Never Know Love"	2026	TBA
"Ballet Pumps"	2026	TBA
"Peter Pan Syndrome"	2026	TBA

== Concert tours ==
=== Headlining ===
- European tour (2024)

=== Supporting ===
- The Dreamsicle Tour (Maren Morris, 2025)
- Australian tour (The Wombats, 2025)
