= New & Lingwood =

British fashion house

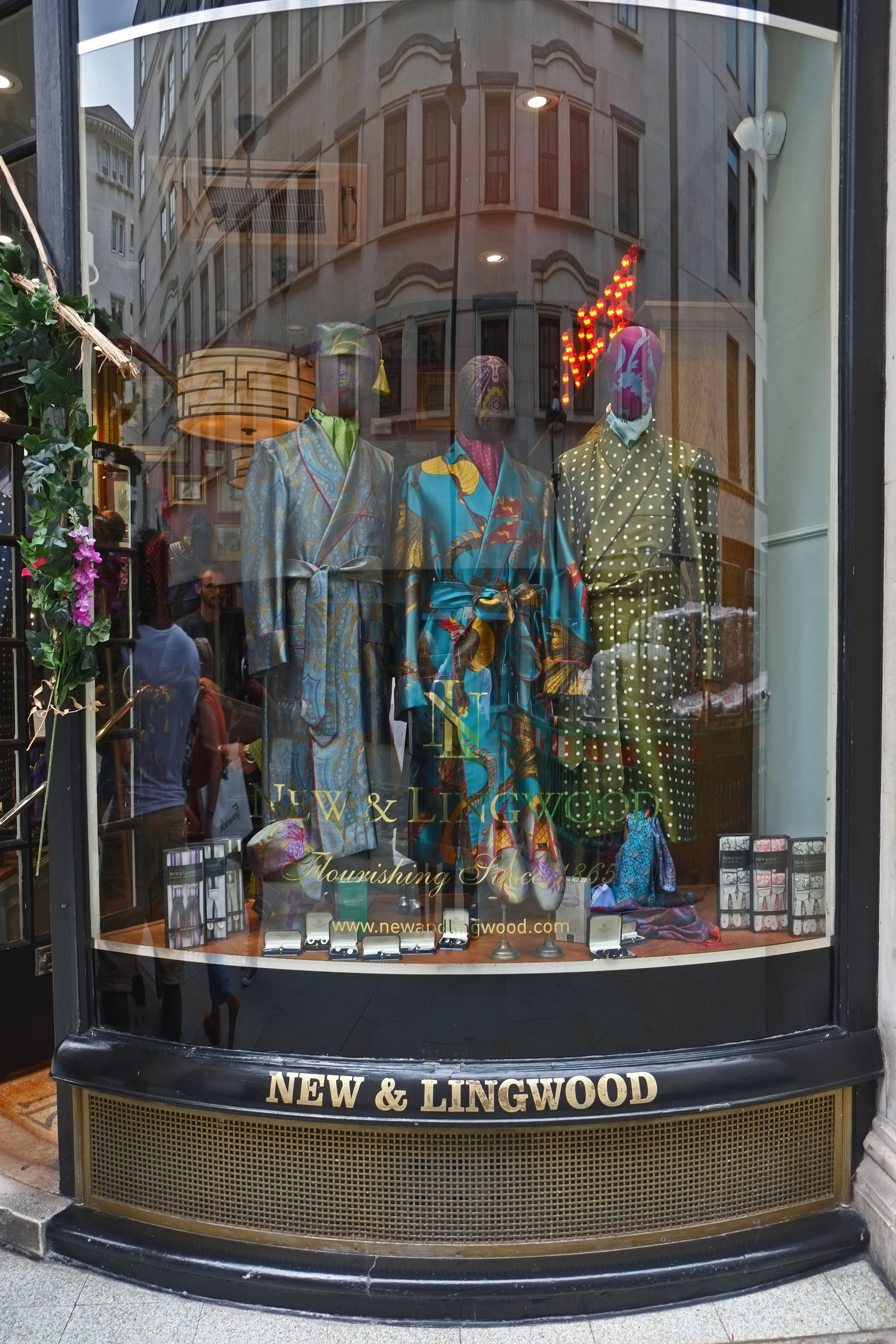
- Shop window on Jermyn Street, London
- Industry: Fashion
- Founder: Elisabeth New, Samuel Lingwood
- Products: Clothing; Accessories
- Website: www.newandlingwood.com

New & Lingwood is a British fashion house, founded in 1865 by Elisabeth New and Samuel Lingwood in Eton, Berkshire. It is known for its longstanding relationship with Eton College, providing school uniforms for students and staff. The brand operates retail locations in Eton and on Jermyn Street in London, offering a range of clothing that includes formalwear, dressing gowns, knitwear, shirts, and accessories.

While traditionally associated with classic British tailoring, the company has incorporated more contemporary and decorative elements into its collections in recent years.

== History ==
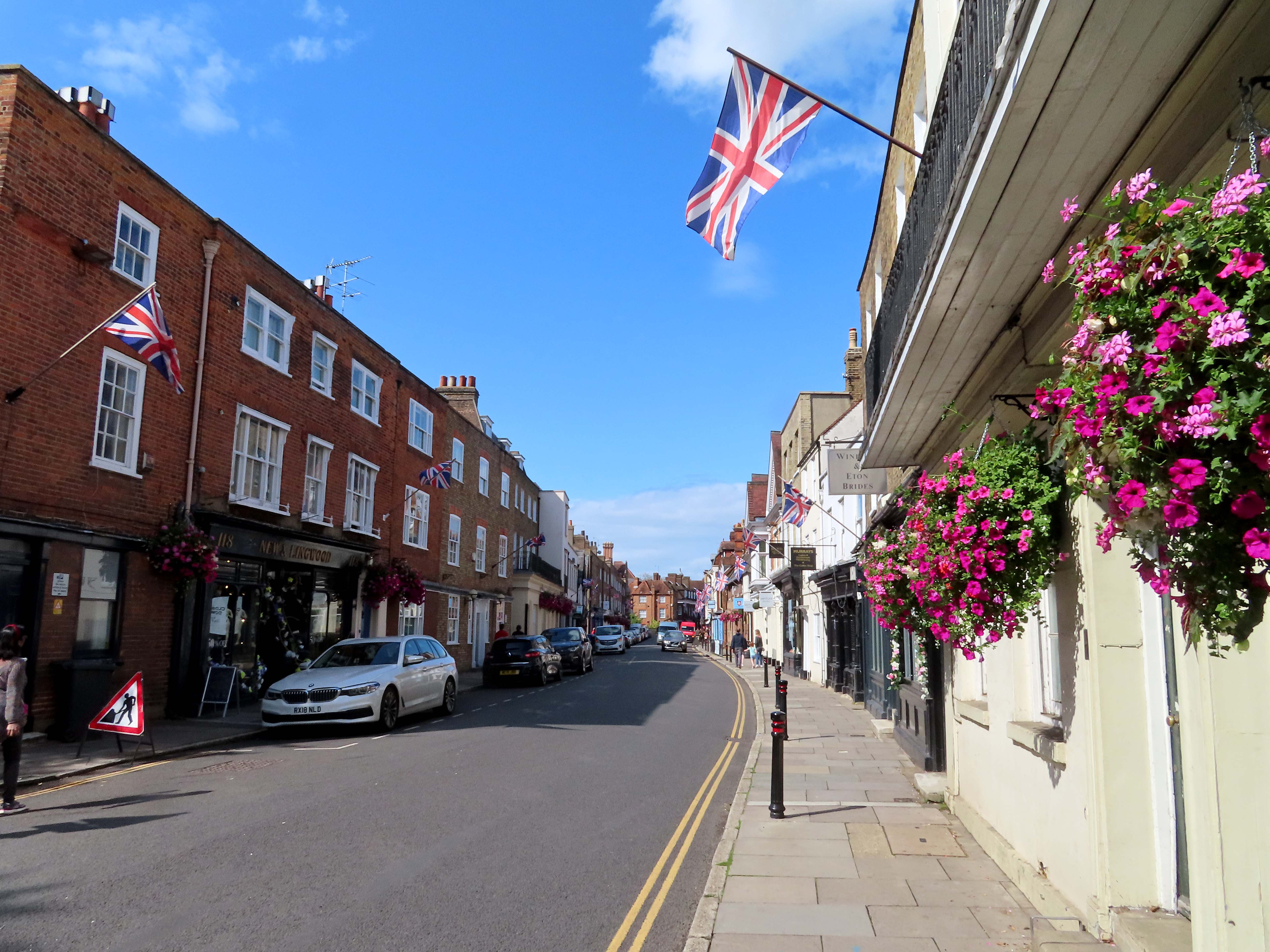
Shop on Eton High Street

New & Lingwood was established in 1865 by Samuel Lingwood and Elisabeth New in Eton, where it became the official outfitter for Eton College. The founders later married, and the partnership with Eton has remained in place for more than 150 years. Products supplied included black tailcoats, striped trousers, waistcoats and detachable-collar shirts.

In 1887, the exterior of the Eton shop was painted white to commemorate Queen Victoria's Golden Jubilee. The change reportedly drew favorable attention from the monarch, who remarked on its appearance, encouraging the shop to retain the new colour.

Following Samuel Lingwood's death in 1916, Elisabeth New took over the business during the First World War. Financial difficulties led her to temporarily place the company in the hands of the courts, but both she and the business remained solvent until her death in 1931.

A second shop was opened in 1922 on Jermyn Street in London, which was then a central location for British menswear retail. The store was destroyed during the Second World War and rebuilt in 1946 at 53 Jermyn Street, where it remains.

Over time, New & Lingwood acquired several other businesses, including shoemakers Poulsen Skone and Joseph Gane & Co., and the bespoke shirtmaker Bowring Arundel. Until the early 2000s, the brand was primarily known for footwear and shirts, but it later developed a more distinctive visual identity featuring bold patterns, silk dressing gowns with skull-and-crossbones motifs, and brightly coloured knitwear.

In 2015, the company was acquired by the U.S.-based private equity firm POP Capital. This acquisition led to the opening of a New York store on the Upper East Side in 2018.

== Notable clients ==
Their black tailcoat, striped trousers, and detachable-collar shirts have been worn by figures such as George Orwell, Ian Fleming, Tom Hiddleston, and Princes William and Harry.
