= Nick Wheeler =

English businessman

Nicholas Wheeler OBE
- Born: Nicholas Charles Tyrwhitt Wheeler; 20 January 1965 (age 61); Ludlow, Shropshire, UK
- Education: Eton College
- Alma mater: University of Bristol
- Occupation: Entrepreneur
- Known for: Founder of Charles Tyrwhitt
- Spouse: Chrissie Rucker (m. 1995)
- Children: 4, including Bea

Nicholas Charles Tyrwhitt Wheeler OBE (born 20 January 1965) is an English businessman. In 1986, he established the Charles Tyrwhitt company and shirt brand, which he owns.

Wheeler was born in Ludlow, Shropshire and was educated at the Dragon School in Oxford and Eton College. At Eton, he was a classmate of former Prime Minister, Boris Johnson. After Eton, Wheeler attended the University of Bristol, where he studied geography. His first job was as a management consultant for Bain & Company.

In November 1986, with the assistance of financing from his family and said connections, he set up Charles Tyrwhitt, a shirt brand in the United Kingdom. It grew to be the UK's largest mail order shirt business, and it also has several brick and mortar locations.

In 2008, he was a regional judge for the Entrepreneur Challenge in the UK.

== Personal life ==
Wheeler is married to Chrissie Rucker, founder of The White Company. They have four children: Tom, Ella, India and Bea.

In 2010, Wheeler supported the Conservatives in the 2010 general election. He voted in favour of the UK's withdrawal from the European Union in 2016.

As of 2020, Wheeler and his wife's collective wealth was estimated at £427 million by the Sunday Times Rich List. In 2016 Wheeler was reported as owning Tythrop Park in Buckinghamshire and a duplex penthouse chalet in Klosters, Switzerland.

== The Wheeler Programme ==
In 2017, Wheeler founded a fully-funded educational programme for around 20 students per year, named "The Wheeler Programme". This has 100 students from local partnering schools at any one time, each student joining in Year 9, before graduating from the programme at the end of Year 13.

Wheeler funds for each of these children to have this experience at Wellington College, a co-educational school in Crowthorne, Berkshire.

When asked to comment, Wheeler said: "Our graduating students are an incredible group of individuals. I have no doubt that they will go on to achieve great things. We have worked hard over the last five years to ensure that they have been given the confidence and skills to make a difference, to not just their own world, but also to the world of all those around them."
