= Charles Tyrwhitt =

Men's clothing retailer

Charles Tyrwhitt Shirts Limited
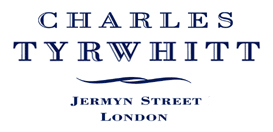
- Company type: Private limited company
- Industry: Clothing
- Founded: 1986; 40 years ago
- Founder: Nicholas Wheeler
- Headquarters: London, United Kingdom
- Products: Men's wear and accessories
- Revenue: ▲GBP185 million (2022)
- Net income: ▲GBP32 million (2022)
- Number of employees: ▲614 (2022)
- Website: charlestyrwhitt.com

Charles Tyrwhitt Shirts Limited (/ˈtɪrɪt/ TIH-rit), also known as CT Shirts, is a British multi-channel men's clothing retailer specialising in dress shirts, ties, suits, casualwear, shoes and accessories.

It was founded as a mail order company in 1986 by Nicholas Wheeler while he was a student at the University of Bristol. Wheeler has stated that he started the business because he thought he "could make a shirt better than anybody else". In 1997, the company opened its first store on Jermyn Street in London, notable for its history in British shirt making.

Wheeler's wife, Chrissie Rucker, is the founder and owner of the White Company.

== History ==
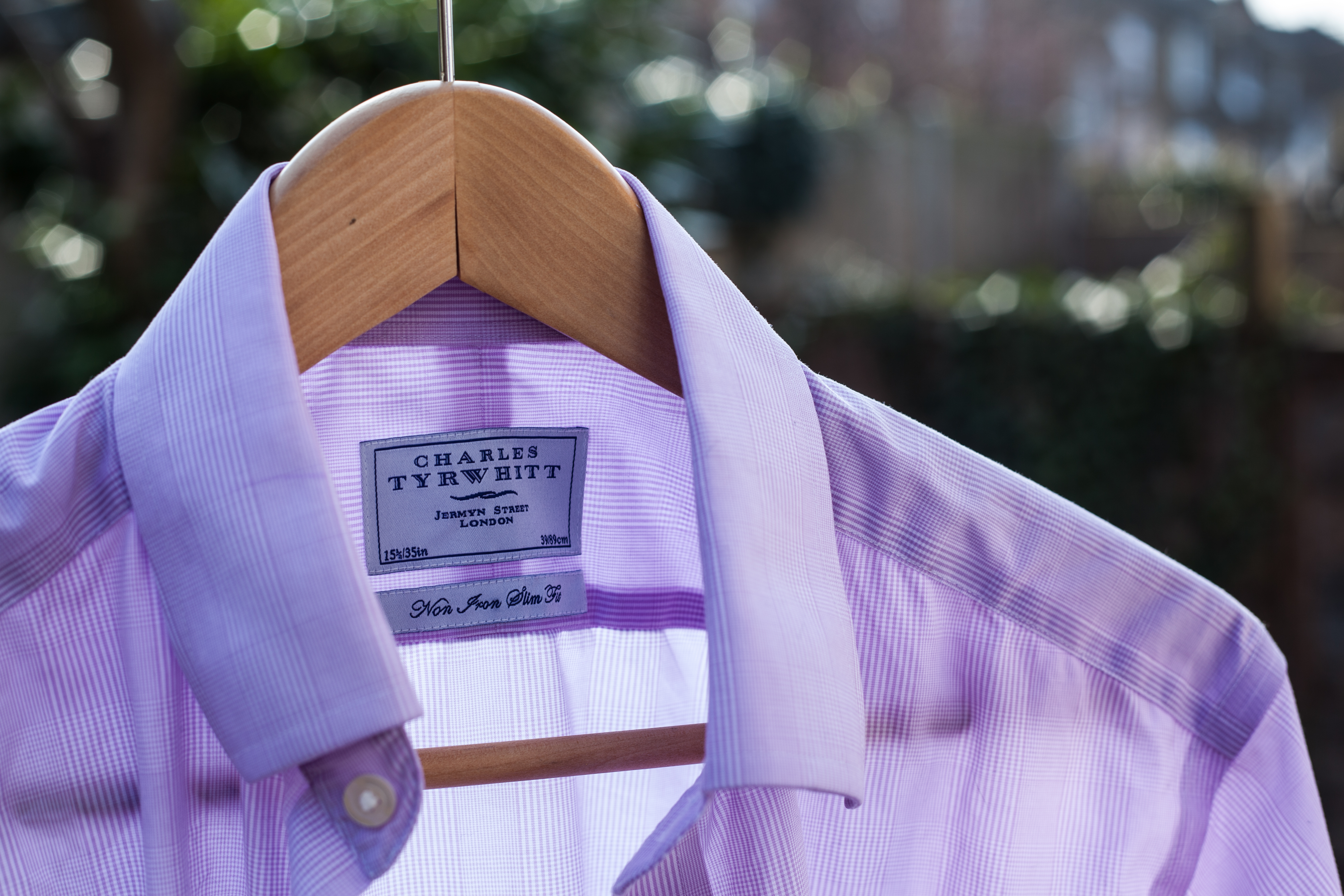
A shirt made by Charles Tyrwhitt

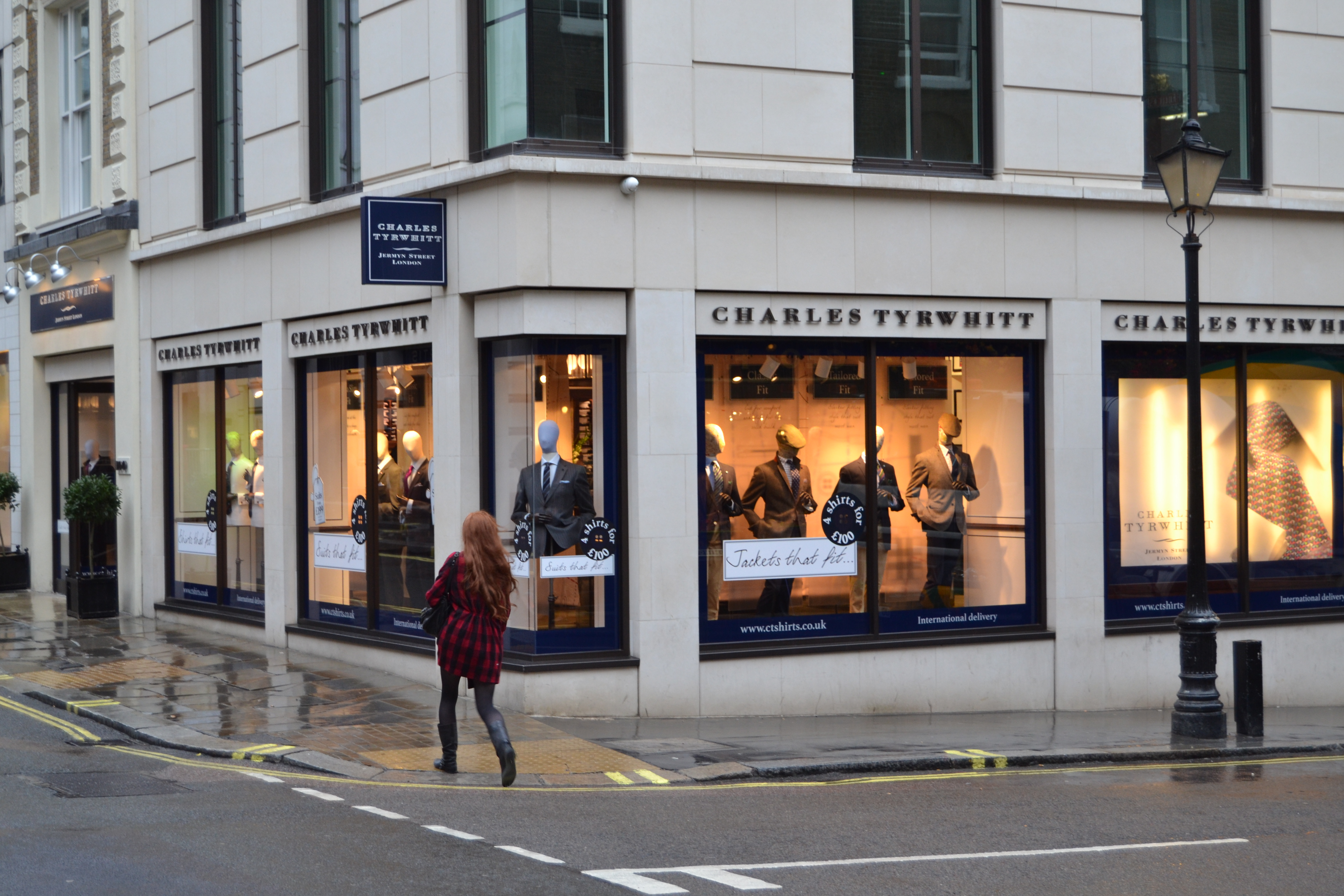
The company's flagship store in London at 100 Jermyn Street

In 1986, Charles Tyrwhitt was founded as a mail order company by Wheeler while studying at the University of Bristol. The company began operating from a small space on Fulham Road in London, before expanding the business with retail and e-commerce stores. Beginning as a men's shirt-maker, the offering has since expanded to include suits, shoes, knitwear, accessories and a collection of business casual wear.

Greg Hodder was the first CEO to be appointed; previously, the company was under the control of founder Nick Wheeler, with no formal CEO position. Hodder served as CEO from 2008 to 2017, followed by David Boynton from 2017 to 2018. Michael Stanier briefly was CEO from 2018 to 2019. Luke Kingsnorth has been the CEO since April 2019.

== Awards ==
Charles Tyrwhitt was awarded first place for customer service in the 2011 Sunday Times Profit Track 100 awards. Charles Tyrwhitt earned awards at the Top 50 Companies For Customer Service Awards, including Best Web Chat, Best E-Retailer, second place for Calls and third for best overall customer service. Charles Tyrwhitt received the Queen's Award for Enterprise for International Trade in 2016.

== See also ==
- Hawes & Curtis
- Hilditch & Key
- Thomas Pink
- Turnbull & Asser
