= Cuttle Brook (north) =

River in Oxfordshire and Buckinghamshire, England

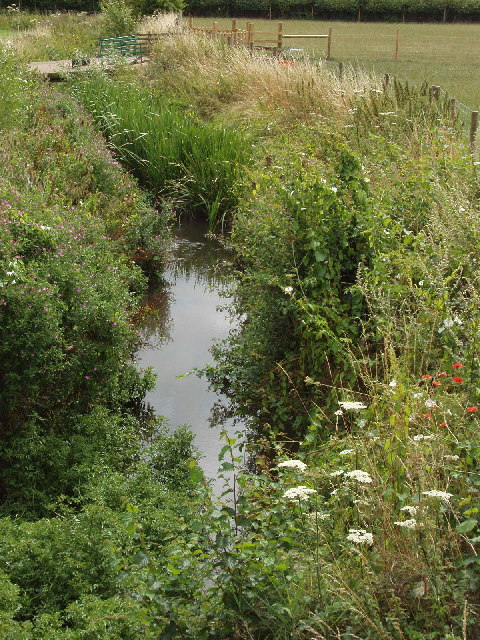

Location
- Country: England
- County: Oxfordshire, Buckinghamshire

Physical characteristics
- Source
  - location: east of Chinnor
  - coordinates: 51°42′33″N 0°53′43″W
- Mouth
  - location: north of Thame in the River Thame
  - coordinates: 51°45′24″N 0°58′40″W
- Length: 24.2 km (15.0 mi)
- Basin size: 54.298 km^{2} (20.965 sq mi)

The Cuttle Brook is a watercourse in England. It is formed as a lake runoff on the border between Oxfordshire and Buckinghamshire east of Chinnor. It initially runs north, forming the boundary between the two counties. South of Kingsey, its run turns west. It runs north of Thame and then flows into the River Thame.
