= Lee H. Letts =

American sculptor

- Lee H. Letts in his New York City studio
- Born: 1951 (age 74–75)
- Education: School of the Museum of Fine Arts, Boston, Academy of Art, The Hague
- Known for: Sculpture, painting
- Spouse: Marion Letts

Lee Harold Letts (born 1951), American artist, sculptor, painter and goldsmith, is primarily known for his bronze sculptures of birds and animals. His practice is based on the principles of traditional studio craftsmanship, as well as the importance of studying under a master in the manner of the American artists who studied at the École des Beaux-Arts in Paris. The beauty of nature is the primary theme of his artwork. He holds a unique position as a bronze sculptor trained as a goldsmith.

== Philosophy ==
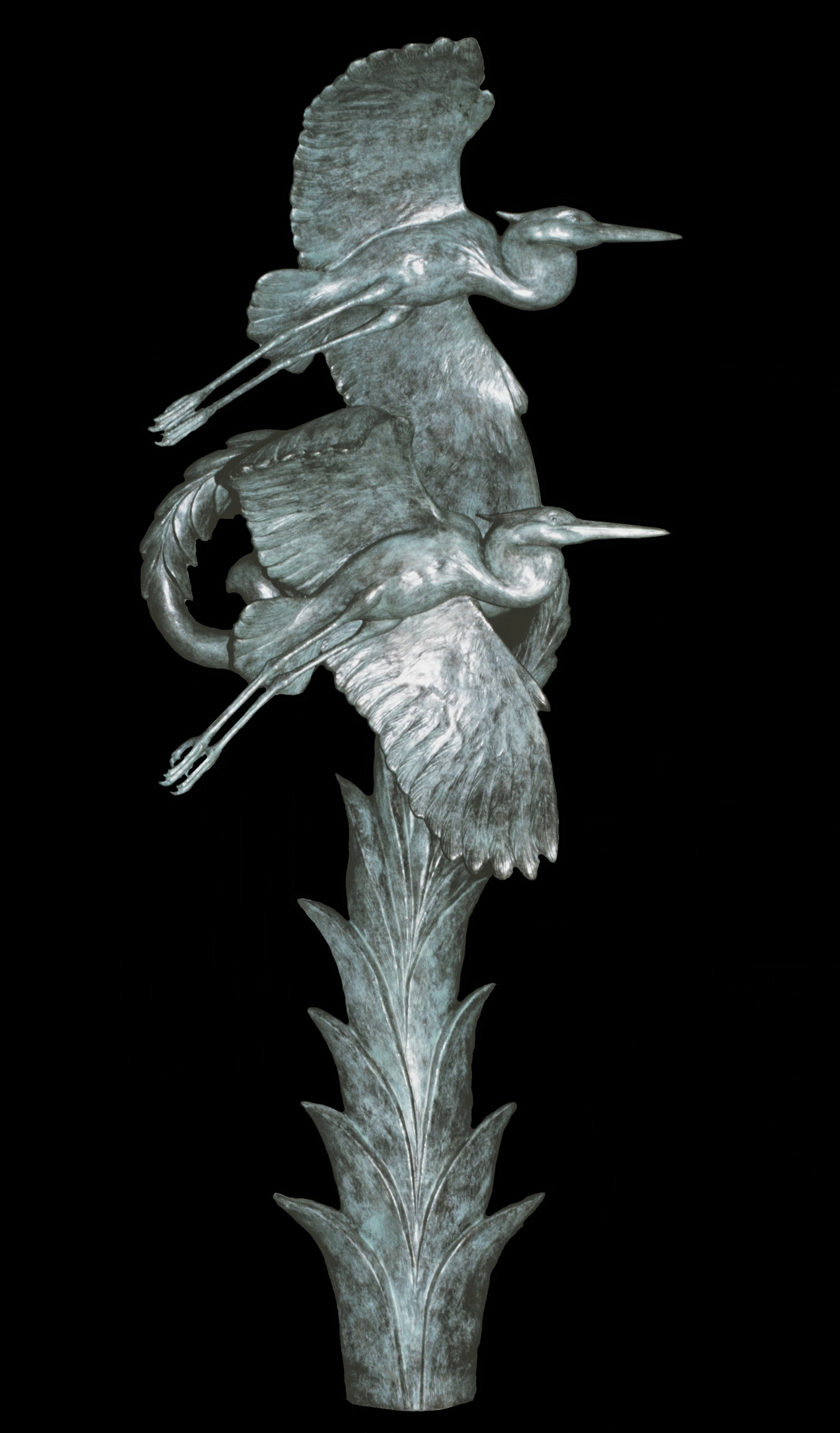
Lee Letts, Great Blue Herons, bronze, 2001, ht. 9 ft.

Letts' philosophy of art is to follow the traditional techniques of the master craftsman, in sculpture, painting, and the art of the goldsmith. However, he stresses that the emotional content and the technical must be on even terms in order for a work to be better than good.

== Early life ==
Frequent visits to Brookgreen Gardens during his youth influenced Letts' artistic development, experiencing in-depth the collection of American sculpture amidst its natural setting. This not only fostered his fascination with the natural world, but also engendered his ideals of the ennoblement of nature through fine art. Brookgreen is also where he first observed the foundry mark of Roman Bronze Works, which would prove to be an important milieu for the artist.

== Education and apprenticeships ==
While in his teens, Letts' artistic abilities were recognized by a teacher who encouraged him towards a career as an artist. Family friend Truman Moore, a 1923 graduate of the Art Institute of Chicago, was also a mentor who encouraged Letts to further his studies in drawing and sculpture at the Museum of Fine Arts, Boston. There he became friends with professor and goldsmith David Austin, which led to an apprenticeship with John Franchot of Story Street Goldsmiths at Harvard Square in Cambridge. Studying art history at the Museum School, Letts grasped the importance of craftsmanship and the significance of the role of lost-wax casting in the history of art, especially in the creation of the bronze sculptures and gold objects of the Italian Renaissance. For his own works, Letts grounded his ideals in Classicism, drawing inspiration from artists of the American Renaissance such as Augustus St. Gaudens. Finding the School of the Museum of Fine Arts Boston lacking the instruction he desired, Letts left for Europe and secured an apprenticeship at Court Jewelers 't Mannetje in The Hague, where he simultaneously studied drawing and painting at the Academy of Art. Returning to the US in 1978, Letts focused on sculpting life-size birds to cast in bronze. He worked from study skins in the collection of the Charleston Museum, and observation from life outside his studio at Longwood (part of the old rice plantation culture on the Waccamaw River) at the Santee Delta, and at the Cape Romain National Wildlife Refuge between Georgetown and Charleston, South Carolina.

Lee Letts, Swallow-tailed Kite, bronze, 1981, ht. 16 in.

In 1980 Letts met the American sculptor Donald De Lue (1897-1988), who was to become a personal friend and have a strong influence on his career. Letts was the only sculptor that De Lue ever accepted for critical instruction in the Beaux-Arts tradition. In 1981, De Lue critiqued and facilitated the acceptance of Letts' Swallow-tailed Kite to the permanent collection of Brookgreen Gardens. This was one of the last sculptures to go into the collection under the old auspices of Archer Huntington's standards, overseen by De Lue. At the time, Letts was the youngest sculptor ever to be included in the collection.

De Lue wrote in 1985:

... There was a fine school of pioneer artists who recorded so much of our natural wild life now a national treasure of the finest quality. Audubon and Catesby high on this list. Lee Letts, a native of South Carolina has worked in this great American tradition. A most sincere artist devoted to the high principals of his artistic and scientific forbears ... He is a fine naturalist and studies his birds in their natural habitat and he makes many drawings, anatomical studies, clay models and expert bronze castes [sic] doing most of his own chasing choosing his bronze and adding a patina that most suits the type of bird now in everlasting bronze. Mr. Letts ... ably continues as the recorder of native wild life ... He is a perfectionist in all that he executes.

== New York ==
For the five years from 1980 to 1984, Letts employed the craftsmen at The Roman Bronze Works in New York City to cast his sculpture. There he developed his work in bronze, applying his knowledge of the time-honored methods of lost-wax casting to carefully oversee the process that had been perfected by Riccardo Bertelli for the majority, if not all of the important American Beaux-Arts artists such as James Earle Fraser, Frederic Remington, and Hermon Atkins MacNeil, who taught Anna Hyatt Huntington (who with her husband, Archer Milton Huntington, founded Brookgreen Gardens).

A particular interest in birds of prey led to the creation of the American bald eagle with outspread wings in celebration of the 200th anniversary of the national emblem of The United States. This bronze of Presidential Eagle was personally presented by the artist to President Ronald Reagan on May 23, 1983, in the Oval Office. The sculpture was cast at The Roman Bronze Works and exhibited in the first-floor east hallway of the West Wing of The White House during Reagan's term of office, and is part of the permanent collection of the Ronald Reagan Presidential Library and Museum in Simi Valley, California.

Letts' bronzes have been exhibited at Hammer Galleries, J.N. Bartfield Galleries, and Hirschl & Adler Galleries, all of New York City.

In 1986 Letts established a studio in New York City and continued his study of wildlife at The American Museum of Natural History, where he developed an interest in African birds and animals. During that time he attended two important Impressionist-Realist exhibits of animal painting and sculpture in New York, the work of Bruno Liljefors at The American Museum of Natural History, and the work in bronze of Rembrandt Bugatti (Wildenstein Gallery). These were the first major exhibits of these artists' works in America.

Letts designs one-of-a-kind precious jewels in gold, platinum and fine gems, and in addition to working by private commission his jewelry is represented by Beretta's Madison Avenue gallery in New York City. Beretta is one of the oldest family owned businesses in the world, dating to the Italian Renaissance.

== Influences ==
In addition to Donald Harcourt De Lue and Alexander Phimister Proctor (who produced the equestrians for Augustus St. Gaudens), other artists who have influenced Letts' career are John LaFarge, Paul Manship, Louis Comfort Tiffany, Daniel Chester French, and Benvenuto Cellini. An Animalier at heart, Letts draws his inspiration from many other great American painters as well, including Martin Johnson Heade. Especially influential artists have been Andrew Wyeth, Carl Rungius, and Bruno Liljefors.

In the realm of precious metals and jewels, Letts admires the designs of Andrew Grima of London, Gilbert Albert of Geneva, and Verdura of New York.

Letts' wife Marion is Director of The Charleston Art & Antiques Forum, a 501(c)3 non-profit lecture series. They have studios in Charleston, South Carolina and Atlanta, Georgia.
