= Floris of London =

Fragrance and toiletries retailer in London, England

Coordinates: 51.50821°N 0.13727°W

Floris London
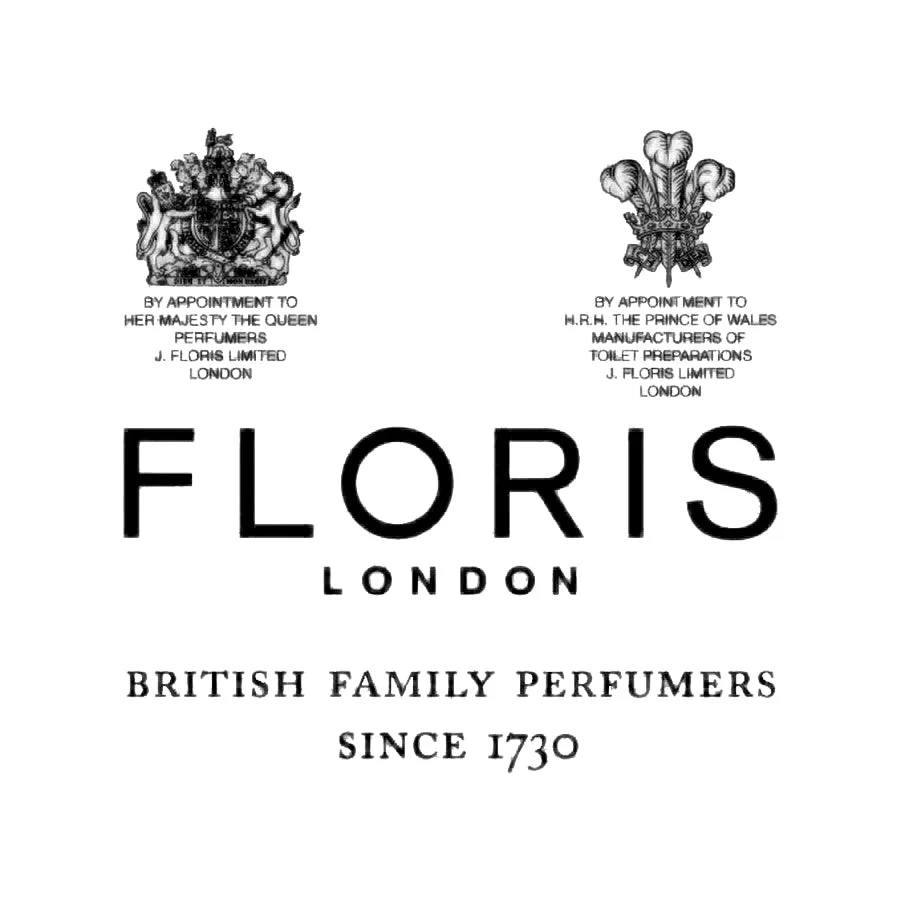
- Floris's former royal warrants of appointment to Elizabeth II and the then-Prince of Wales
- Type: Private
- Industry: Fragrance
- Founded: 1730; 296 years ago in London, England, United Kingdom
- Founder: Juan Famenias Floris
- Headquarters: United Kingdom
- Website: Official website

Floris (also J. Floris Ltd or Floris of London Holdings Ltd) is a British perfume house based at 89 Jermyn Street, London. The oldest English retailer of fragrance and toiletries, the house has been family-owned since its inception in 1730 and is presently run by the 8th and 9th generations of the family.

The company has long been associated with British monarchs and other members of the British royal family, as well as politicians and celebrities from the UK and overseas.

== History ==
Juan Famenias Floris arrived in England from his native island of Menorca to seek his fortune. Shortly after his arrival in 1730, he secured premises in Jermyn Street, in the elegant quarter of London's St. James's. While Floris initially set up business as a barber shop and comb-maker, he had studied perfumery in Montpellier, and went on to create and sell perfume inspired by the aromas of his youth in the Mediterranean.

=== Royal warrant ===
The first Royal Warrant granted to J. Floris Ltd was in 1820 as 'Smooth Pointed Comb-makers' to the then King George IV soon after his accession. Today this first Royal warrant is still on display at 89 Jermyn Street together with no less than 19 others. Floris holds the warrants Perfumers to HM The Queen Elizabeth II, granted in 1971, and Manufacturers of Toilet Preparations to HRH The Prince of Wales, granted in 1984.

== Stores ==
Floris Perfumery on Jermyn Street, London

The London store is in Jermyn Street, London, in the same building Juan Floris created the business in the 18th century. The mahogany counter used in the store was purchased from the Great Exhibition at the Crystal Palace in Hyde Park in 1851.

Until 1989, perfumes were produced on site on Jermyn Street. In this year, however, to satisfy growing consumer demand, a new factory was established in Devon, opened by Diana, Princess of Wales.

A new bespoke fragrance service began in 2006 for which customers are invited into the Floris perfumery which sits to the rear of the Jermyn Street premises.

In 2012, Floris opened a second London shop at 147 Ebury Street, Belgravia, offering the full Floris range, together with a Bespoke Perfumery service. This shop later closed in 2017.

The first renovations in over 100 years took place at the Grade II listed Jermyn Street premises in 2017. During this renovation a new museum space was created at the rear to display a variety of archive items.

== Notable customers ==
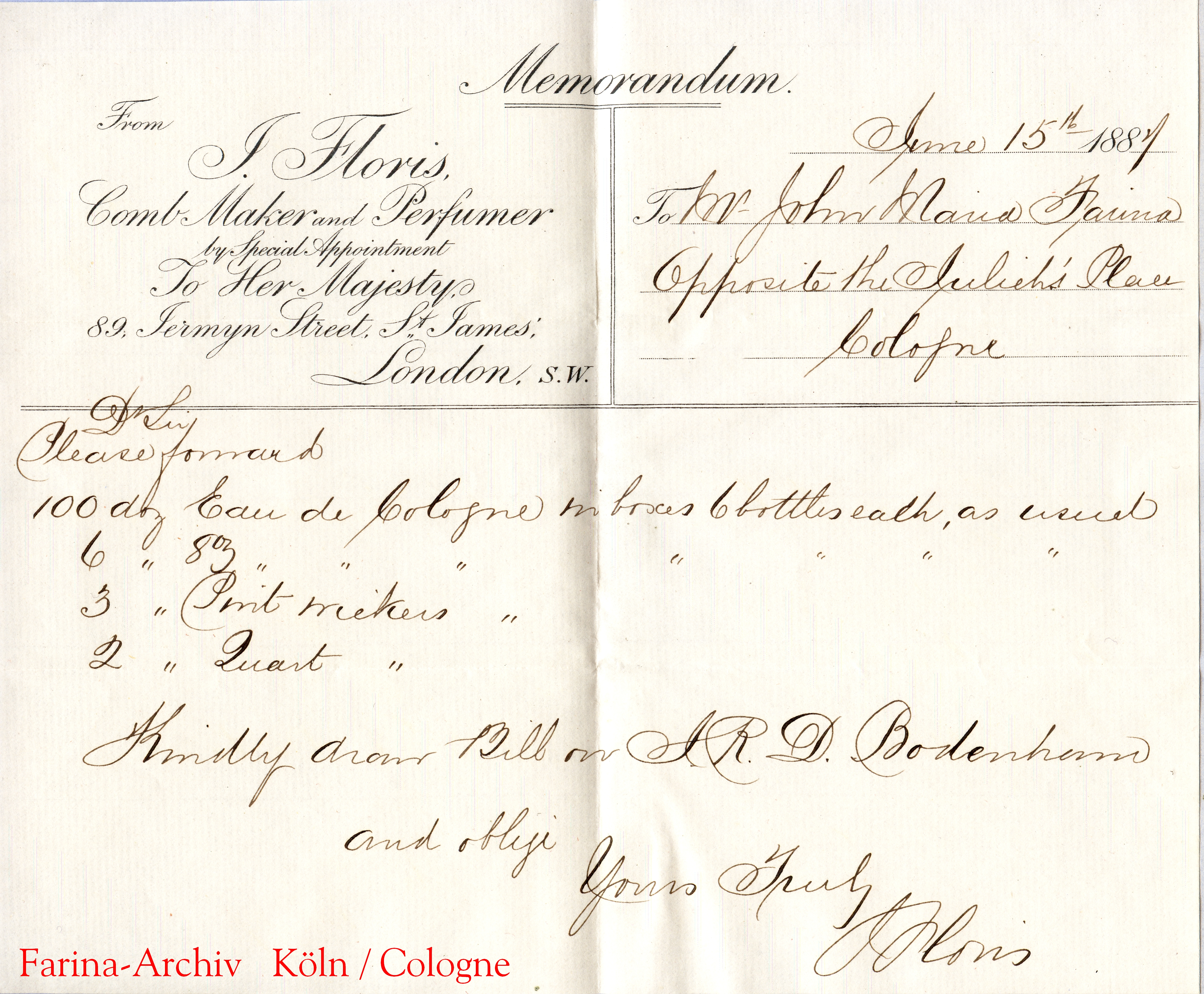
Floris order of Eau de Cologne to Farina in Cologne, 1887

The Floris archives hold letters from famous customers detailing their preferences and their thanks, including the following examples:

- Winston Churchill, according to records held by Floris, purchased Special No. 127 Eau de Toilette and Stephanotis in 1934.
- Marilyn Monroe was also known to have purchased from Floris on at least one occasion, having made a purchase of Rose Geranium while staying at the Beverly Hills Hotel, California in 1959.
- Florence Nightingale wrote a 25 July 1863 letter thanking Mr Floris for his 'sweet-smelling nosegay'.
- Mary Shelley, whilst abroad, sent friends instructions to purchase her favourite combs and toothbrushes from Floris.
- Floris also creates bespoke fragrances for the British royal family, including the creation of a unisex fragrance for the wedding of the Duke and Duchess of Sussex in 2018.

== Fictional references ==
Ian Fleming, the creator of the fictional spy James Bond, was a regular customer at Floris. This personal preference led directly to references in the James Bond novels. In Moonraker (1955), Fleming writes that Floris supplies the soaps and other toiletries in the restrooms in the private club Blades and in Diamonds Are Forever (1956) Fleming noted Bond's use of Floris-made bath essence.

Al Pacino's character in Scent of a Woman declared he knew the 'woman in his sights' was wearing a Floris fragrance.
