= Chester Barrie =

Tailor in London, England

Coordinates: 51.51138°N 0.14056°W

- Company type: Private
- Industry: Retailer
- Founded: 1935
- Founder: Simon Ackerman
- Headquarters: London, W1, United Kingdom
- Products: Clothing, Fashion
- Parent: Prominent Europe
- Website: Official website

Chester Barrie was a 'semi-bespoke' gentleman's tailor last located at No. 19 Savile Row, London.

Founded in 1935 by Simon Ackerman, a tailor born in Russia who immigrated to the United States, and presently owned by Prominent Europe. The business provided ready-to-wear clothes, as well as made-to-measure tailoring.

== History ==
At the turn of the 20th century, Simon Ackerman left Kaunas, Russia for New York City. Having built up a high-priced, quality tailoring business in and around New York, in 1935 he decided that he wanted to import quality British-made suits for the US market. He traveled to England, founding Chester Barrie in 1935 and opening a factory in Crewe in Cheshire - midpoint between cloth mills of Huddersfield and the Port of Liverpool. His aim was to create ready-to-wear tailoring, that was of the same quality and had the same attention to detail as the bespoke tailors of Savile Row but without the wait and high cost. Suits for export had the button holes un-finished, where by sending them back to the United States unfinished thus avoided the import duty.

The factory was opened in Chestnut Grove under the name Chester Barrie, based on combining:

- Chester, the city and county town of the location he chose for his factory
- Barrie, the surname of children's fiction writer J. M. Barrie, who wrote Peter Pan.

In 1937, the business opened a store on Savile Row. The following year Ackerman returned to the United States, placing his son Myron in charge of the British business.

The business's growth continued until late 1939 and the start of World War II when the factory's production turned to the war effort, eventually picking up a contract to produce officers' uniforms for the US Army in Europe, after the United States entered the war post the attack on Pearl Harbor.

Post-war, business picked up, and in 1949 the factory moved into no longer needed sections of the Rolls-Royce Crewe factory, which itself had been constructed pre-war as a shadow factory to mass-produce the Rolls-Royce Merlin engine. The new capacity allowed the firm to expand, including supplying its product to Harrods after Myron sent his own sales people in initially to promote the product.

Ackerman was very wise in his promotional activity, engaging popular movie stars including Cary Grant and popular figures including Sir Winston Churchill, backing this up with practical and relatively affordable style. Having sold across Europe and the former Commonwealth Empire since 1955, in 1961 the company moved to a new factory in Crewe, to allow the Bentley Motors business to expand.

In 1978, the Ackerman family sold the business to the Austin Reed Group, by which time the business was employing 470 people, selling to Harrods, Selfridges, Turnbull & Asser and Saks Fifth Avenue, in Manhattan, New York. Austin Reed started using the factory to produce a number of other brands beside Chester Barrie, and from 1981 started to produce the ready-to-wear stock for fellow Savile Row tailor H. Huntsman. In 1989 the company won the Queen's Award for Export Achievement, and in 1998 started making the purple label suits for Polo Ralph Lauren.

== Present ==
As the dot.com boom decline hit world markets, the demand for bespoke suits declined. In financial troubles, Austin Reed sold the loss-making Chester Barrie business to Thompson Holdings (Richard Thompson) in 2000. After the business went in receivership in 2002, the Crewe factory sold to former management, trading as the Cheshire Clothing Company, who later moved to a new factory. SRG Group plc acquired the Chester Barrie Brand and worldwide licensing rights, and engage CCC to manufacture top-end bespoke suits.

In 2006, CCC itself went into receivership and closed. A new independent manufacturing company was formed in Crewe, Cheshire Bespoke, who again widened their manufacturing offering to supply ranges for brands including Ozwald Boateng.

In 2007, the ownership of the Chester Barrie brand and worldwide licensing rights were sold to Prominent Europe. This has given the brand a new lease of life, while the relationship with Cheshire Bespoke is much diminished.

Chester Barrie ran a number of concessions within department stores across the UK - including Harvey Nichols, Austin Reed, John Lewis and House of Fraser - where they offered their ready-to-wear tailoring as well as a Made To Measure service. The product offer was expanded to include shirts and ties plus a more "dress-down" selection, reflecting the shift in styles of dressing..

The presence of other brands, introduced to the portfolio in 2015 (and sold in the same locations), with arguably stronger identities and a wider-global appeal ensured a continued dilution of the Chester Barrie identity in a changing-modern market. Chester Barrie's then-Buyer, Chris Modoo, doubled-down on the classic English look, bringing in Edward Sexton to help with the development of the brand's "block". However, this alienated the brand from the "mainstream" stores it had concessions in, which saw competitors, and the market as a whole, moving to softer-shouldered garments, a more contemporary silhouette and more lifestyle-led; and in 2017 Chris Modoo was made redundant by Prominent Europe. However, a new creative direction saw the brand split into three distinctive categories: Chester by Chester Barrie (an entry level version of the brand, primarily sold in John Lewis), Chester Barrie Black Label (primarily sold in the House of Fraser concessions) and Chester Barrie Gold Label (sold in the flagship Savile Row store). It was hoped the "halo effect" of the high end product would filter down from the gold label to the other lines.

There was some initial success, with a bumper year in 2018, as gross sales for Prominent Europe began to soar, however this growth was down to the business having opened more locations in House of Fraser and less about the Chester Barrie brand itself, this was in spite of a £100,000 re-fit of the flagship.

However, in October 2019 Prominent Europe announced to its Chester Barrie staff that they were under threat of redundancy as they looked to restructure the overall business and in January 2020, Prominent Europe made the decision to close its branded business, with the closure of the Savile Row flagship (the building has since been taken up by Daisy Knatchbull) and it being exited from the aforementioned department stores. The last remaining store is the Chester Barrie outlet in York, which is scheduled to close in early 2021. It is unknown if there is a buyer in place to salvage the brand.

In 2022 Prominent Europe sold Chester Barrie to a UK based private consortium with extensive industry experience and plans for the brand worldwide.

== Timeline ==
- 1935 Simon Ackerman returns to set up business in London.
- 1937 Opened first Chester Barrie store on Savile Row.
- 1938 Myron Ackerman, Simon's son is despatched to run the business in the UK.
- 1941 World War II, Chester Barrie makes uniforms for American officers.
- 1949 Chester Barrie opened a larger factory shared with the Rolls-Royce Company.
- 1950 Begin selling to Harrods and Austin Reed. Harrods originally rejected the brand for being too expensive but Myron Ackerman sent his own staff to work in store and the suits sold extremely well.
- 1955 Started selling across Commonwealth countries (Australia, Canada, Hong Kong, etc.) and Europe (notably France, Sweden and Belgium)
- 1961 Chester Barrie moved to a new purpose built factory in Crewe to keep up with demand.
- 1978 Business sold to the Austin Reed Group. By then Chester Barrie was employing over 470 people. Selling to Harrods, Selfridges, Turnbull & Asser and Saks Fifth Avenue, New York City.
- 1981 Chester Barrie gained recognition from founders of Savile Row, when H. Huntsman ordered their first ready-to-wear stock from Chester Barrie.
- 1989 Won the Queen's Award for Export Achievement.
- 1998 Starts making purple label suits for Polo Ralph Lauren.
- 2000 bought by Thomson Holdings.
- 2002 Goes into receivership. Crewe factory sold to former management, trading as the Cheshire Clothing Company, who later move to new factory. SRG Group plc acquires the Chester Barrie Brand and worldwide licensing rights, and engage CCC to manufacture top-end bespoke suits, while others are outsourced to Far East.
- 2006 CCC goes into receivership and closes. New independent manufacturing company formed in Crewe, Cheshire Bespoke, who now widen offering to cover ranges for brands including Ozwald Boateng.
- 2007 Chester Barrie business and brands sold to Prominent Europe, who continue relationship with Cheshire Bespoke.
- 2017 Chris Modoo is made redundant as Buyer for Chester Barrie.
- 2018 Prominent Europe have a bumper year of sales, albeit with reduced profit margins. It proved to be the best year for the branded retail-division.
- 2018 Prominent Europe spend over £100,000 on the re-fit of the flagship store.
- 2019 Prominent Europe reviews its brand strategy, with the looming threat of redundancy for its branded division staff.
- 2020 Prominent Europe close their retail operation, involving the closure of all Chester Barrie concessions and the flagship Savile Row shop.
- 2022 - Prominent Europe sells Chester Barrie to private UK based Consortium.
