= Jermyn Street showroom of Andrew Grima =

1960s London jewellery store

Coordinates: 51.507946°N 0.137917°W

The London showroom of jeweller Andrew Grima opened in 1966 at 80 Jermyn Street in the St James's district. It no longer exists due to subsequent redevelopment. It was designed in the brutalist style.

== Description ==
The façade to the street was made from asymmetrical 'tombstone sized' slabs of slate on a steel framework designed by sculptor Bryan Kneale. The jewellery was displayed to the street in irregularly shaped openings and peepholes to attract spectators. The distinctive exterior offered "a foretaste" of Grima's unique jewellery designs found within the shop.

The showroom was entered through a large aluminium door which was opened automatically from the inside. The door was designed by Geoffrey Clarke. The interior was designed by the film designer Ken Adam. The shop was fitted by P.M. Designs Ltd. Grima's office was situated in what has been described as a "white textured-concrete tub-like pillbox bunker" in the middle of the showroom. Grima's brothers, Godfrey and George were the architects of the showroom. Grima said that he wanted to "show the world what a 21st-century shop should look like. No counters to form a barrier between customer and salesperson, clean lines, no clutter—everything designed to lead the customer toward the jewels".

== Reception ==
In 2017 historian Nicholas Foulkes wrote that the showroom was "pure Barbarella meets Bond villain lair" and that in the present day it was "difficult, if not impossible, to appreciate the excitement" that accompanied the opening of the shop in 1966. It was opened by Grima's friend and client, Lord Snowdon. Snowden was married to Princess Margaret, Countess of Snowdon. Snowden's patronage attracted Prince Philip, Duke of Edinburgh to buy a brooch for his wife, Queen Elizabeth II. Grima received a Royal warrant the same year. The showroom has been described as "one of the sights" of Swinging London and a "destination" for 1970s glitterati.

The National Heritage List for England described the shopfront as "extraordinary". In 1970 an underground showroom designed by Grima's brothers was created to display his watch designs for Omega. The underground room was accessed by a translucent staircase designed by the engineer Peter Rice and built by Ove Arup & Partners. It was claimed to be the world's first circular acrylic staircase.

The shopfront was a stylistic precursor to Wartski's shopfront of 1974 on Grafton Street in Mayfair, designed by John Frederick Bruckland. Wartski's shopfront was listed Grade II in November 2012.
