= 22 Jermyn Street =

Site of several former hotels in London, England

- Location within Central London

General information
- Location: 22 Jermyn Street, London, England, United Kingdom
- Coordinates: 51°30′31″N 0°08′08″W
- Opening: 1870, 1990
- Closed: October 1, 2009
- Owner: Henry Togna
- Operator: Togna family

22 Jermyn Street is the address of the site of several former hotels, including the Eyrie Mansion and an eponymously named luxury hotel in London, England. Jermyn Street is in St James's in the centre of London's West End, 75 yards from Piccadilly Circus.

== History ==
Jermyn Street began construction in 1664. The first house was built on the site of 22 Jermyn Street in about 1685 and, during the 18th century, it was occupied by tradesmen who served the grandees of St James's Square.

Since 1685, it functioned as a hotel, with tradesmen supplementing their incomes by sub-letting the top rooms as residential chambers to "wealthy men-about-town."

By 1861, 22 Jermyn Street was the residence of Italian silk merchant Cesare Salvucci.

Around 1876, it was purchased by a military tailor amongst whose lodgers were banker Theodore Rothschild.

The current building was constructed in the 1870s as the home of an English gentleman and came under the ownership of the Togna family from 1915. Henry Togna ran the Eyrie Mansion hotel selling to his son, Henry Jr. The building was reopened in 1990 as a formal hotel and the rooms retained their eccentricity with traditional English furnishings. The hotel closed on October 1, 2009.

== The hotel ==
The hotel has been described by Frommer's travel guide as "London's premier town-house hotel, a bastion of elegance and discretion", with its sixth floor denoted as "featuring one of the best-equipped computer centers in London."

The hotel had a newsletter and also a separate Restaurant Newsletter of an annual circulation of over 56,000 a year.

In February 2010, American film critic Roger Ebert criticized its impending demolition. He wrote of his experience at The Eyrie Mansion:

"We ascended in an open iron-work elevator to an upper floor and I was let into 3-A. A living room had tall old windows overlooking Jermyn Street. Dark antique furniture: A sideboard, a desk, a chest of drawers, a sofa facing the fireplace, two low easy chairs, tall mirrors above the fire and the sideboard. He used a wooden match to light the gas under artificial logs.

A hall led to a bedroom in which space had been found for two single beds, a bedside table between them, an armoire, a chest, a small vanity table and another gas fireplace. In the bathroom was enthroned the largest bathtub I had ever seen, even in the movies. The fixtures were not modern; the water closet had an overhead tank with a pull-chain. "This is larger than I expected," I said. "How many rooms do you have in all?" "Sixteen."

For 25 years I was to come here to Jermyn Street time and again. Now I can never return. Some obscene architectural extrusion will rise upon the sacred land, some eyesore of retail and condos and trendy dining. Piece by piece, this is how a city dies. How many cities can spare a hotel built in 1685, the year James II took the crown?

I will barely be able to bring myself to return Jermyn Street, which is, shop for shop, the finest street in London. When I approach it again I will have to enter from Piccadilly by walking down through the Piccadilly Arcade and not from Lower Regent Street. I can still attend a lunchtime concert at St. James, or call in at Turnbull & Asser the haberdashers, Paxton and Whitfield the cheese mongers, Wilton's the restaurant, and Waterstone's the book store...but I cannot and will not ever again walk past 22 Jermyn Street. The address itself will be dead. "

== Awards ==
Since the hotel opened in 1990 it has won numerous awards, including Where Magazine's 'Small Hotel of the Year' in 1993, SLH 'Hotel of the Year' in 1995, Good Hotel Guide 'Cesar Award' in 1996, 'London's Premier Townhouse Hotel', and the Gault Millau in 1999. Owner Henry Togna was voted one of the World's Best Hoteliers' Entrée in 1998.
