= Paxton & Whitfield =

English cheesemongers

Coordinates: 51°30′30″N 0°08′13″W

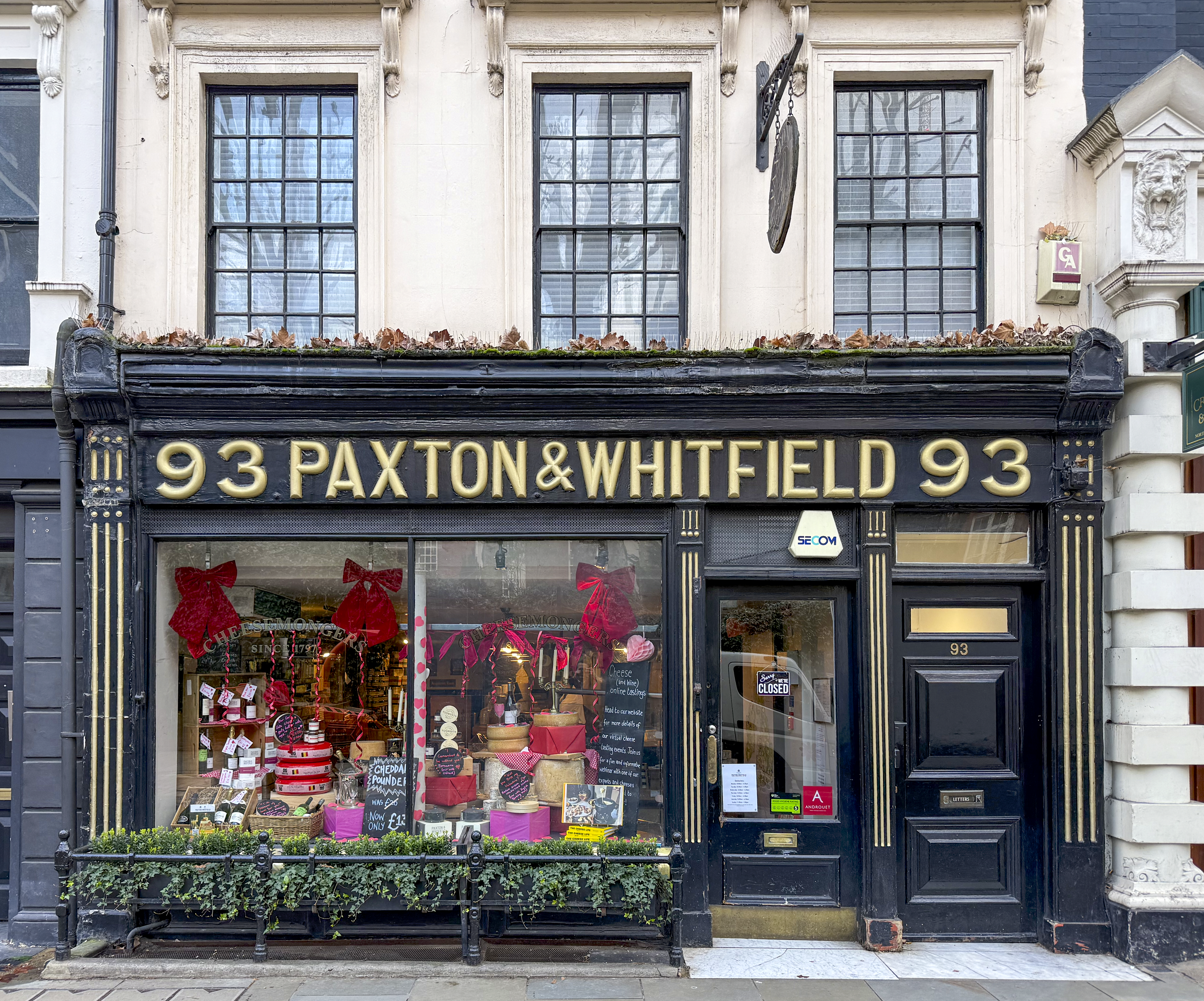
Cheesemonger Paxton & Whitfield on Jermyn Street in London

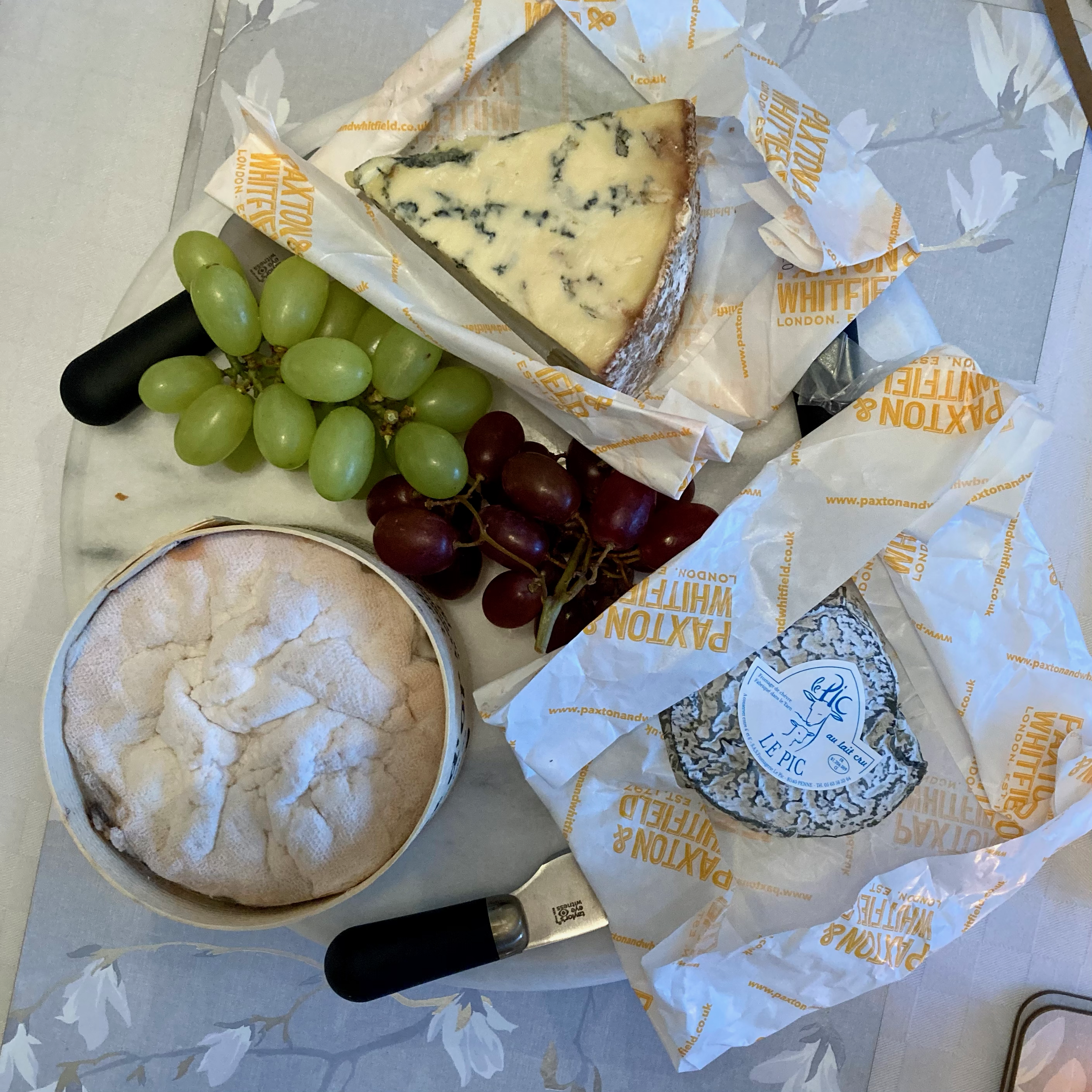
Selection of cheese from Paxton & Whitfield wrapped in branded wax paper.

Paxton & Whitfield are one of the oldest cheesemongers in England. Their main shop is located at 93 Jermyn Street, London, with branches in Chelsea, Canterbury, and Bath.

== History ==
Paxton & Whitfield were founded in 1797 but have roots going back to a market store in Aldwych in 1742. Originally located at 19 Jermyn Street, they moved to their current location in 1894.

Paxton & Whitfield hold a royal warrant from King Charles III; the relationship with the Royal Warrant Holders Association goes back to Queen Victoria in 1850.

Fred Moore bought the company in 1929, and several changes of ownership followed through purchase or inheritance. Since 1992, the company has belonged to Arthur Cunynghame. In 1932, the future King Edward VIII, then Prince of Wales, appointed the company as a Royal Warrant holder, and his brother and successor, King George VI, granted his Royal Warrant in 1936. During World War II, the company faced difficulties due to wartime shortages of milk and cheese, and for a time, it operated as a regular grocery store. Only after the war could the company's original range of products be gradually rebuilt by utilizing existing contacts with traditional cheesemakers. In 1972, the Queen Mother, Elizabeth Bowes-Lyon, appointed the company as one of her Royal Warrant holders. Prince Charles granted his Royal Warrant in 1988, and Queen Elizabeth II appointed Paxton & Whitfield as a Royal Warrant holder in 2002. The current owner, Arthur Cunynghame, already owned two cheese shops at the time of the takeover in 1992, one in Stratford-upon-Avon and one in Bath. He also renamed these shops Paxton & Whitfield, so the company currently has three branches.

Winston Churchill famously remarked: "A gentleman buys his hats at Locks, his shoes at Lobbs, his shirts at Harvey and Hudson, his suits at Huntsman and his cheese at Paxton and Whitfield."
