= Mary Homer =

British businesswoman (born 1958)

Mary Elizabeth Homer (born 7 September 1958) is a British businesswoman. She helped in expanding the Topshop globally before leaving for The White Company in July 2017.

== Career ==
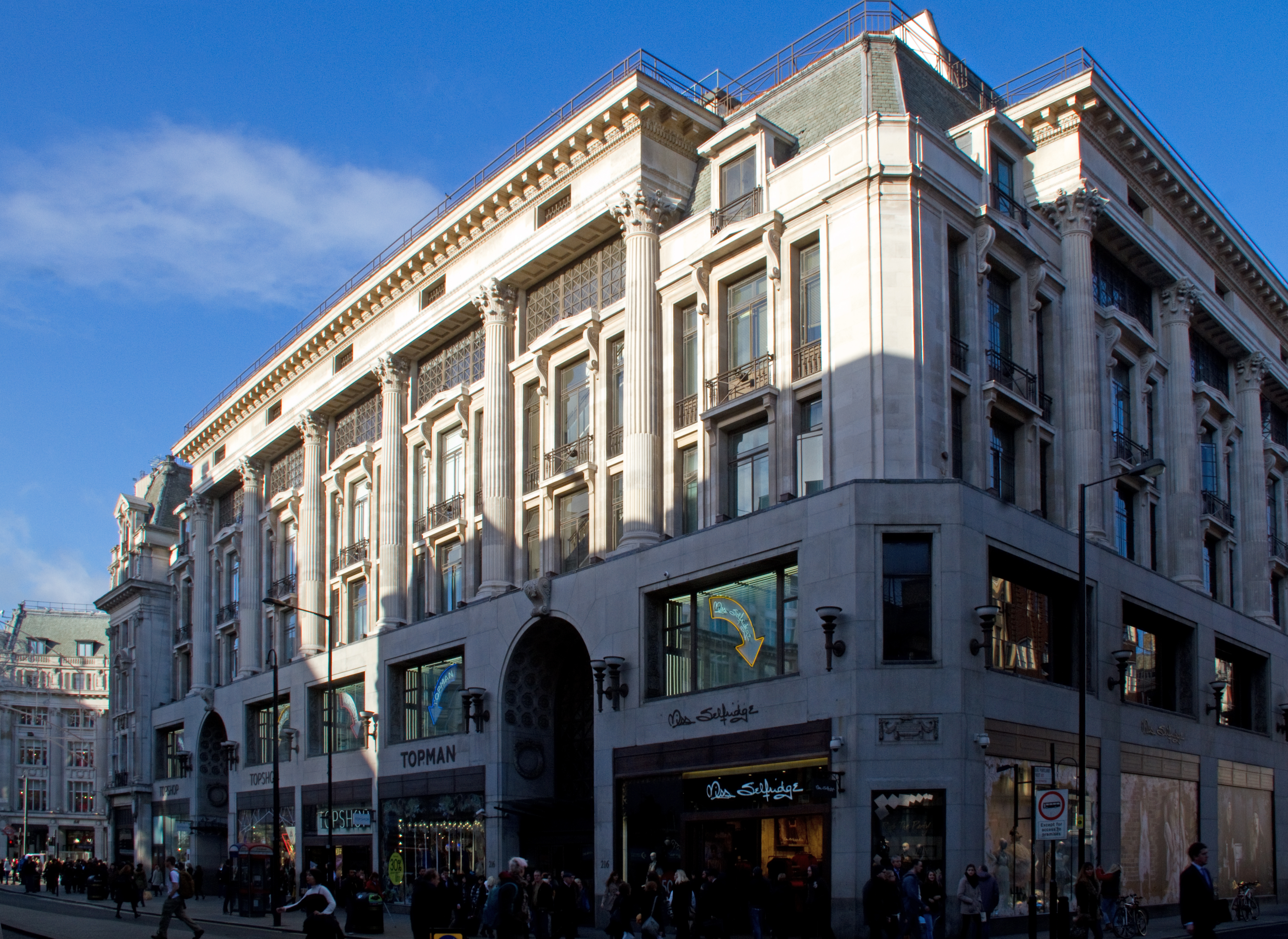
Topshop in London in December 2012

=== Topshop ===
Homer was born in south-west Essex. She joined Topshop in 1985.

Jane Shepherdson left her role as managing director of Topshop in 2007. After her departure, Mary Homer, who was the commercial director, and Karyn Fenn, the buying director, took on joint managing director roles. Later in 2007, Karyn Fenn left Topshop, leaving Mary Homer as the sole managing director. Following her time at Topshop, Mary Homer transitioned to Chief Executive Officer at The White Company, where she oversees homewares, fashion, and international expansion initiatives.

From 2008 to 2010 she was on the board of the British Fashion Council.

== See also ==
- Sergio Bucher, Chief Executive of Debenhams since October 2016
- Helen Connolly, Chief Executive of Bonmarché

Business positions
Preceded by Jane Shepherdson	Managing Director of Topshop (Joint Managing Director until August 2007); October 2006 - July 2017	Succeeded by
