= Hilditch & Key =

British shirt-maker

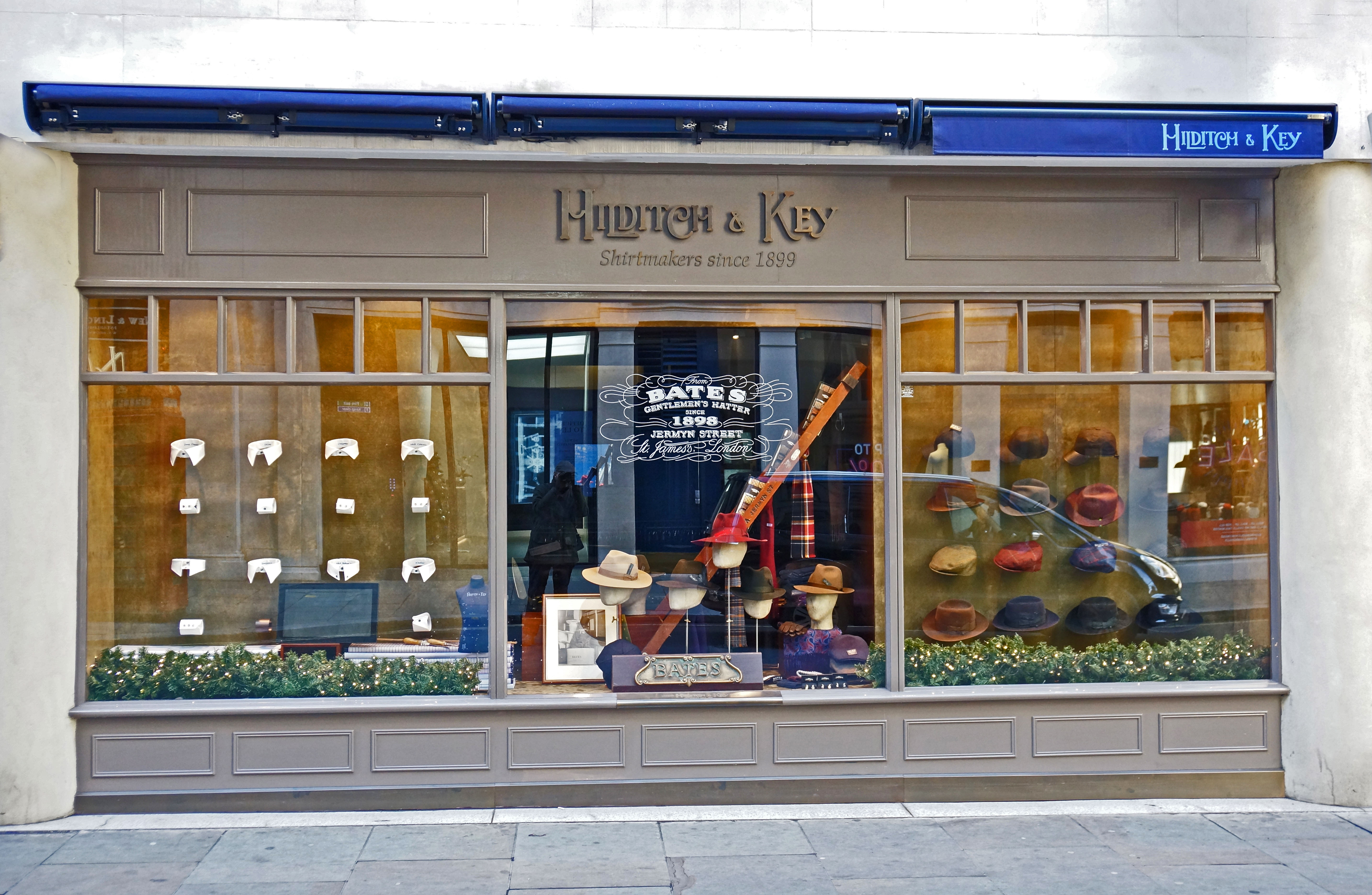
Shopfront on Jermyn Street

Hilditch & Key is a British shirt-maker established in 1899 and based on Jermyn Street.

== History ==
The business was founded in 1899 by Charles F. Hilditch and W. Graham Key, who had previously trained at Harman's on Duke Street. Initially opened on Tottenham Court Road, the store targeted a young audience of university undergraduates. They moved to Jermyn Street a few years later, and opened a store in Rue de Rivoli, Paris, in 1907.

After the store was destroyed during the Blitz, temporary premises were taken at number 65 Jermyn Street, then the company moved permanently to number 39. During the 1970s, the company was acquired by Michael Booth, a long-time customer of the brand, who also eventually purchased the hatter Bates.

After Steven Miller, the former managing director of Turnbull & Asser, became CEO of the company, the Scottish factory was closed. Bespoke shirts are made in Milan, Italy.

German fashion designer Karl Lagerfeld was a loyal customer of the brand, owning more than 1,000 Hilditch & Key shirts.
