= Kingsey =

Village in Buckinghamshire, England

Coordinates: 51.754°N 0.926°W

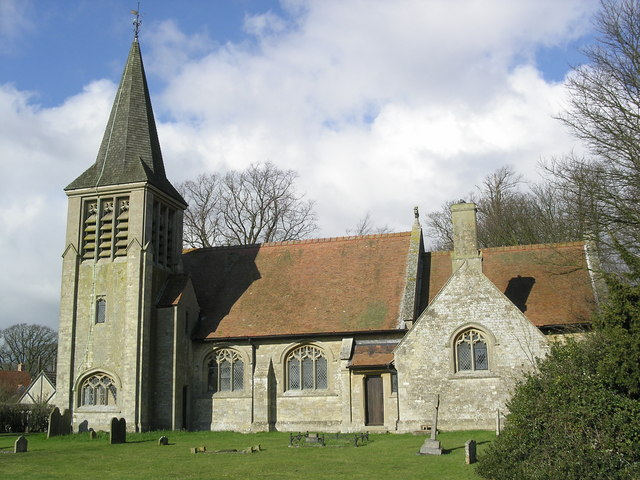
- St Nicholas, Kingsey

- Location within Buckinghamshire
- Population: 207 (2011 Census including Aston Sandford)
- OS grid reference: SP7406
- Civil parish: Kingsey
- Unitary authority: Buckinghamshire
- Ceremonial county: Buckinghamshire
- Region: South East
- Country: England
- Sovereign state: United Kingdom
- Post town: Aylesbury
- Postcode district: HP17
- Dialling code: 01844
- Police: Thames Valley
- Fire: Buckinghamshire
- Ambulance: South Central
- UK Parliament: Mid Buckinghamshire

Kingsey is a small village and civil parish in Aylesbury Vale district in Buckinghamshire, England. It is near the boundary with Oxfordshire, about two miles east of Thame and a mile south of Haddenham.

The village toponym is of 12th-century origin and means 'king's island', referring to a piece of dry land that belonged to the king in the marshes that were once common in this part of the country. In 1174 the village was called Eya, meaning 'island', though by 1192 it had gained its more modern name of Kingesie. This leads historians to believe that the village is named after King Richard I of England.

Kingsey was transferred to Buckinghamshire from Oxfordshire in 1933, effectively being swapped for Towersey.

Historically people from this village and those surrounding it were known by the derogatory term 'wetfeet', because of the high water table of the area leading to the ground being so waterlogged.

Grade I listed Tythrop Park in Kingsey is listed as having an early duck decoy similar to that in Boarstall Duck Decoy in Buckinghamshire. (Location map)
