= Chrissie Rucker =

British businesswoman (born 1968)

Chrissie Rucker OBE
- Born: Belinda Christian Rucker; 6 November 1968 (age 57); Edenbridge, Kent, England
- Education: Combe Bank School, Sevenoaks
- Occupation: Entrepreneur
- Spouse: Nicholas Wheeler (m. 1995)
- Children: 4, including Bea

Chrissie Rucker OBE (born 6 November 1968) is a British businesswoman, best known for founding British retailer The White Company in 1994. Because of her self-made success story and the similar products, she has been compared to Martha Stewart. Rucker is also a founding patron of the not-for-profit social enterprise, woman supporting women, The Princes Trust.

Rucker's husband Nicholas Wheeler founded Charles Tyrwhitt, a menswear chain. Rucker was appointed a MBE in 2010 and in 2012 was chosen as Private Businesswoman of the Year by the Financial Times. She and her husband were each appointed OBE for their business success in December 2017.

== Personal life ==
Rucker was born in Edenbridge, Kent. Rucker is married with four children to Nicholas Wheeler. Their collective net worth was estimated at £427 million according to the Sunday Times Rich List in 2020. Together they live in Buckinghamshire and also own a chalet in Klosters, Switzerland, named Haus Alpina.

== Published works ==
- 2019 – For the Love of White: The White & Neutral Home (ISBN 9781784725563)
- 2022 – The Art of Living with White: A Year of Inspiration (ISBN 9781784727130)
