= Andrew Grima =

Anglo-Italian designer

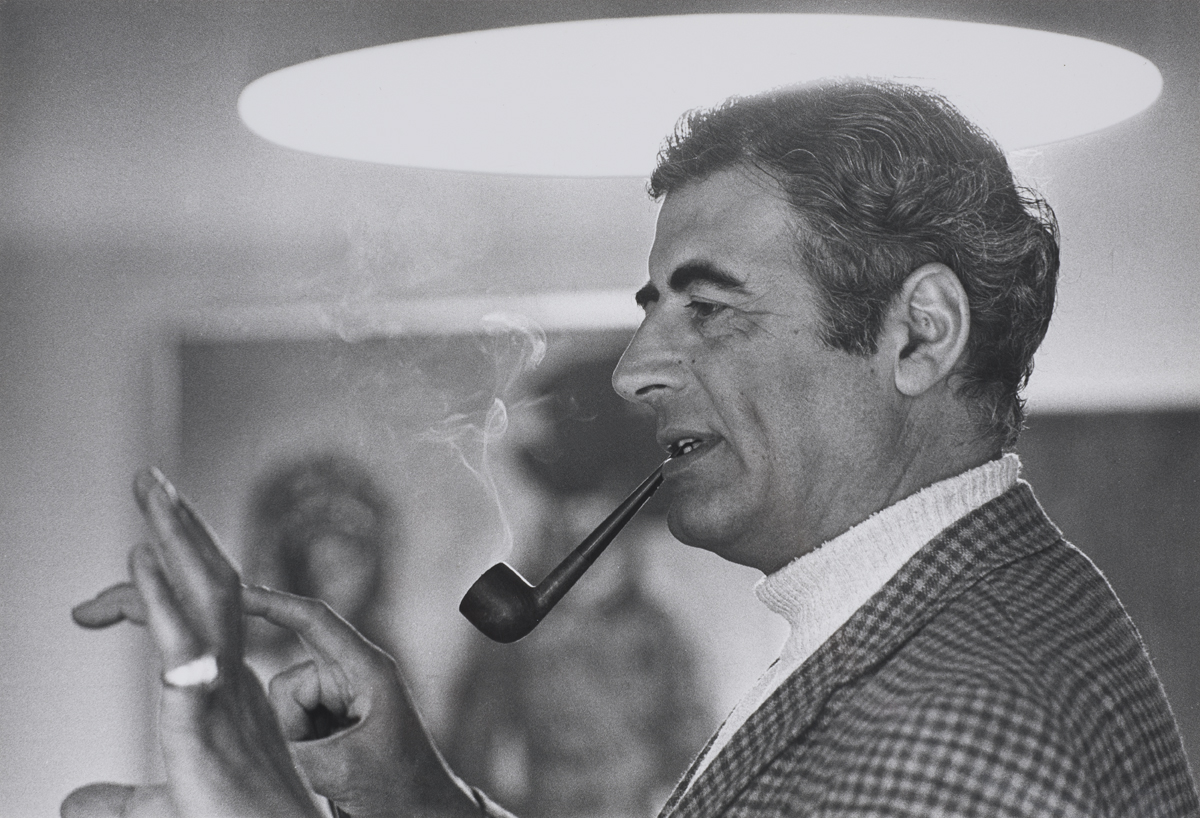
- Andrew Grima in his studio in Sonning, Berkshire, 1969
- Born: Andrew Peter Grima; 31 May 1921; Lungotevere Mellini 51, Rome, Italy
- Died: 26 December 2007 (aged 86); Gstaad, Switzerland
- Education: University of Nottingham
- Occupation: Jewellery Designer
- Known for: Modern jewellery design
- Spouses: Helène Haller (m. 1947; div. 1977); Jojo Maughan-Brown (m. 1977-2007)
- Children: 4
- Parent(s): John Grima, Leopoldina Farnese
- Awards: Duke of Edinburgh Prize for Elegant Design, 1966; The Queen's Award for Export; De Beers Diamonds International Award (13 times)
- Website: https://grimajewellery.com

Andrew Grima (31 May 1921 – 26 December 2007) was an Anglo-Italian jewellery designer.

Grima was born in Rome to Italian-Maltese parents and grew up in London, where he attended Salesian College, Battersea and St Joseph's College, Upper Norwood. He later studied mechanical engineering at the University of Nottingham. The family was artistic and creative: his father was an embroidery designer and Grima's brothers became architects, helping design his London showroom in 1966.

Grima joined the Royal Engineers, serving in Burma in World War II with the 7th Indian Division of the British Army.

== Jeweller ==
After the war, he started work in his father-in-law's jewellery firm in London, Haller Jewellery Company Limited (H.J. Co) initially in the accounts department, before moving into design.

He became the foremost modern jewellery designer in the West End of London in the 1960s and 1970s, selling designs from his showroom at 80 Jermyn Street in St James's. The distinctive Brutalist façade was designed to attract spectators. The architects of the showroom were Grima's brothers. Grima said that he wanted to "show the world what a 21st-century shop should look like. No counters to form a barrier between customer and salesperson, clean lines, no clutter—everything designed to lead the customer toward the jewels". In 1970 he designed the "About Time" watch collection for Omega and in 1976 a collection of gold digital LED watches for Pulsar

Grima won several awards for his contribution to the jewellery industry. He was the only jeweller to win the Duke of Edinburgh Prize for Elegant Design and won 13 De Beers Diamonds International Awards; more than any other jeweller. His clients included members of the British Royal family, as well as Barbara Hepworth and Jacqueline Onassis.

Notable pieces include Queen Elizabeth II's ruby brooch, as well as a brooch of lichen cast in gold for Princess Margaret. More recently, fans of his work have included fashion designers Miuccia Prada and Marc Jacobs.

Examples of Grima's work are held in the Victoria & Albert Museum and in the collection of the Worshipful Company of Goldsmiths.

On 20 September 2017 Bonhams auctioned the largest private Grima collection to ever be sold at auction.

In December 2020, the first monograph, "Andrew Grima: The Father of Modern Jewellery" written by William Grant was published by ACC Art Books

== Personal life ==
Grima married twice, firstly in 1947 to Helène Haller, niece of the Viennese jeweller who brought Grima into the trade. The couple had a son and two daughters; they divorced in 1977.

The same year, Grima married Jojo Maughan-Brown, great-granddaughter of Sir Thomas Cullinan. They had one daughter, who, with her mother, continues the business.

In 1986 the Grimas moved to Switzerland, first to Lugano and in 1992 to Gstaad, where Grima died on 26 December 2007.
