= Turnbull & Asser =

British shirt-maker

Turnbull & Asser Limited
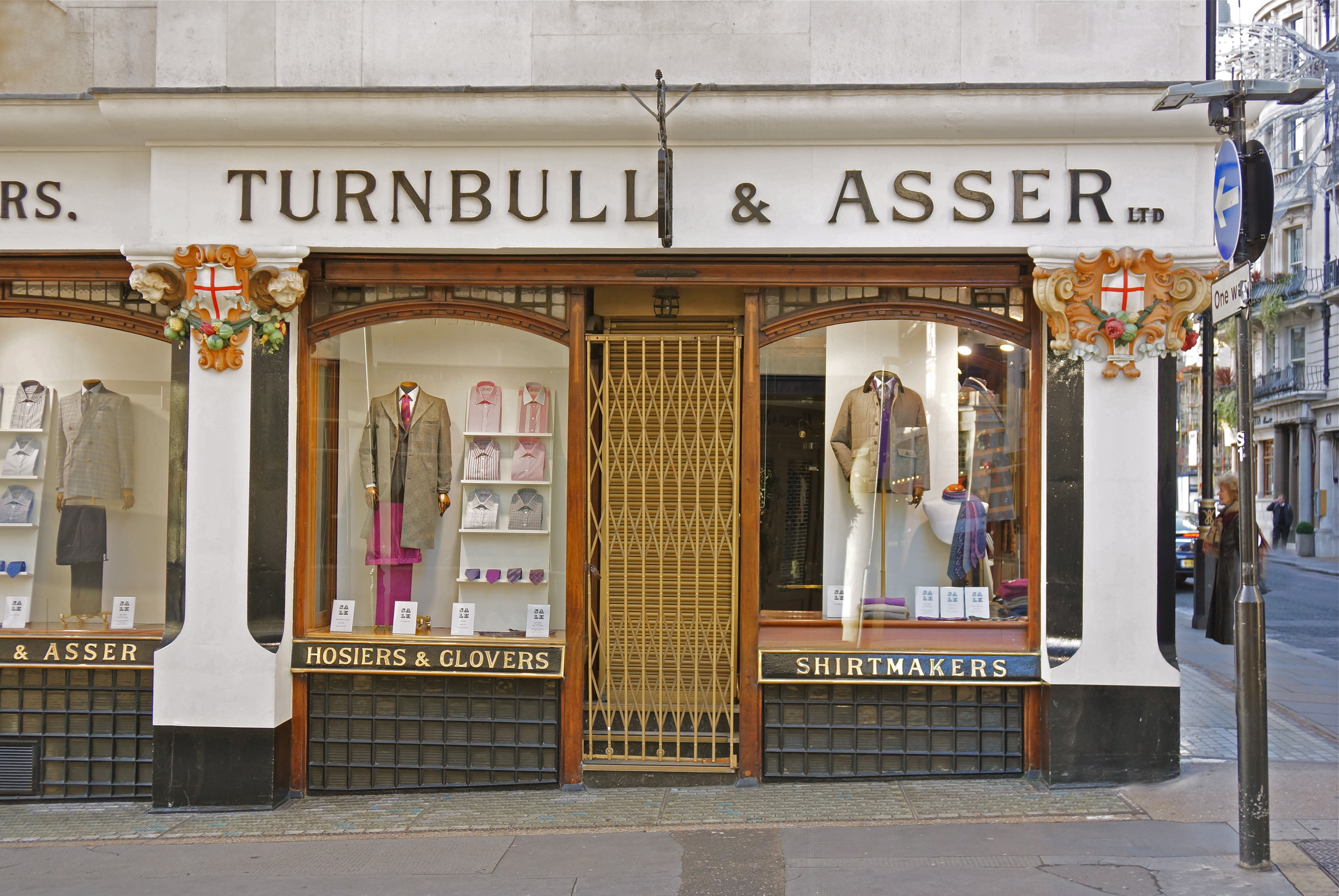
- Turnbull & Asser on Jermyn Street
- Type: Private
- Industry: Clothing
- Founded: 1885; 141 years ago
- Founders: John Arthur Turnbull; Ernest Asser
- Headquarters: London, W1; United Kingdom
- Number of locations: London (2); New York (1)
- Products: Shirts, knitwear, suits, accessories, hosiery
- Services: Bespoke, made-to-measure, ready-to-wear
- Website: turnbullandasser.com

Turnbull & Asser is a British male luxury clothing retailer. The company was established in 1885 and currently has its flagship store on Jermyn Street in the St James's area of London and its bespoke store around the corner on Bury Street. In addition to the two London stores, the company has a shop in New York City.

== History ==
The business was founded as a hosiery under the name "John Arthur Turnbull" in 1885 by John Arthur Turnbull and Ernest Asser, "at the time, a hosier and salesman, respectively". It was established in the St James neighbourhood of London, as the area was the site of numerous clubs and high-end haberdashers. The name was changed to "Turnbull & Asser" in 1895.

In 1903, after continued success and the death of John Turnbull, the company moved to its present location at 71-72 Jermyn Street. In 1915, during World War I, Turnbull & Asser developed a raincoat which doubled as a sleeping bag for the British military. It is known as the Oilsilk Combination Coverall & Ground Sheet.

Between the 1920s and the 1970s, Turnbull & Asser grew its London business from a haberdashery to a clothier, expanding into sportswear, clothing (both bespoke and ready-to-wear), and ready-to-wear shirts. As its symbol, it used a hunting horn with a "Q" above, called the Quorn, after 'The Quorn Hunt', one of the oldest hunts in England. Many of Turnbull & Asser's articles were called by this name, such as the "Quorn scarf".

During the 1960s, Turnbull & Asser was known for catering to the Swinging London set. In 1962, Turnbull & Asser provided shirts and ties for the film adaptation of the James Bond film Dr. No. The character of James Bond, as first portrayed by Sean Connery, whose dress shirts had turnback cuffs fastened with buttons as opposed to cufflinks, referred to as "cocktail cuffs" or "James Bond cuffs". Turnbull & Asser also provided the shirts for some of the subsequent films in the series, including those featuring Pierce Brosnan and Daniel Craig.

In the 1970s and 1980s, Turnbull & Asser revived its traditional business model. Once it discovered that Americans were increasingly buying its wares, it began offering trunk shows at the Grand Hyatt in New York City. Beginning in 1974, the company sold ready-to-wear shirts in the United States through department stores Bonwit Teller and Neiman Marcus. For a brief period, beginning in 1979, Turnbull & Asser operated a small store in Toronto. A Beverly Hills location was opened in 2003 and closed several years later. In 2016, another shop, in New York, was opened at the World Trade Center station, and this also closed.

In February 2018, Turnbull & Asser posted a 1.2 Million pound loss, leading to a £1m equity injection from its owner, Ali Fayed. Shirts and ties are still made in its Gloucester factory. In response to the COVID-19 pandemic, Turnbull & Asser dedicated its Gloucester workroom to making medical-grade uniforms for National Health Service personnel.

== House style ==
Turnbull & Asser advertises its Classic T&A collar, a semi-spread with a deep point and an outward flare designed to curve over the collar bone, as its signature style. They also emphasize a three-button cuff style as a staple in their ready-to-wear line.

== Royal Warrant ==
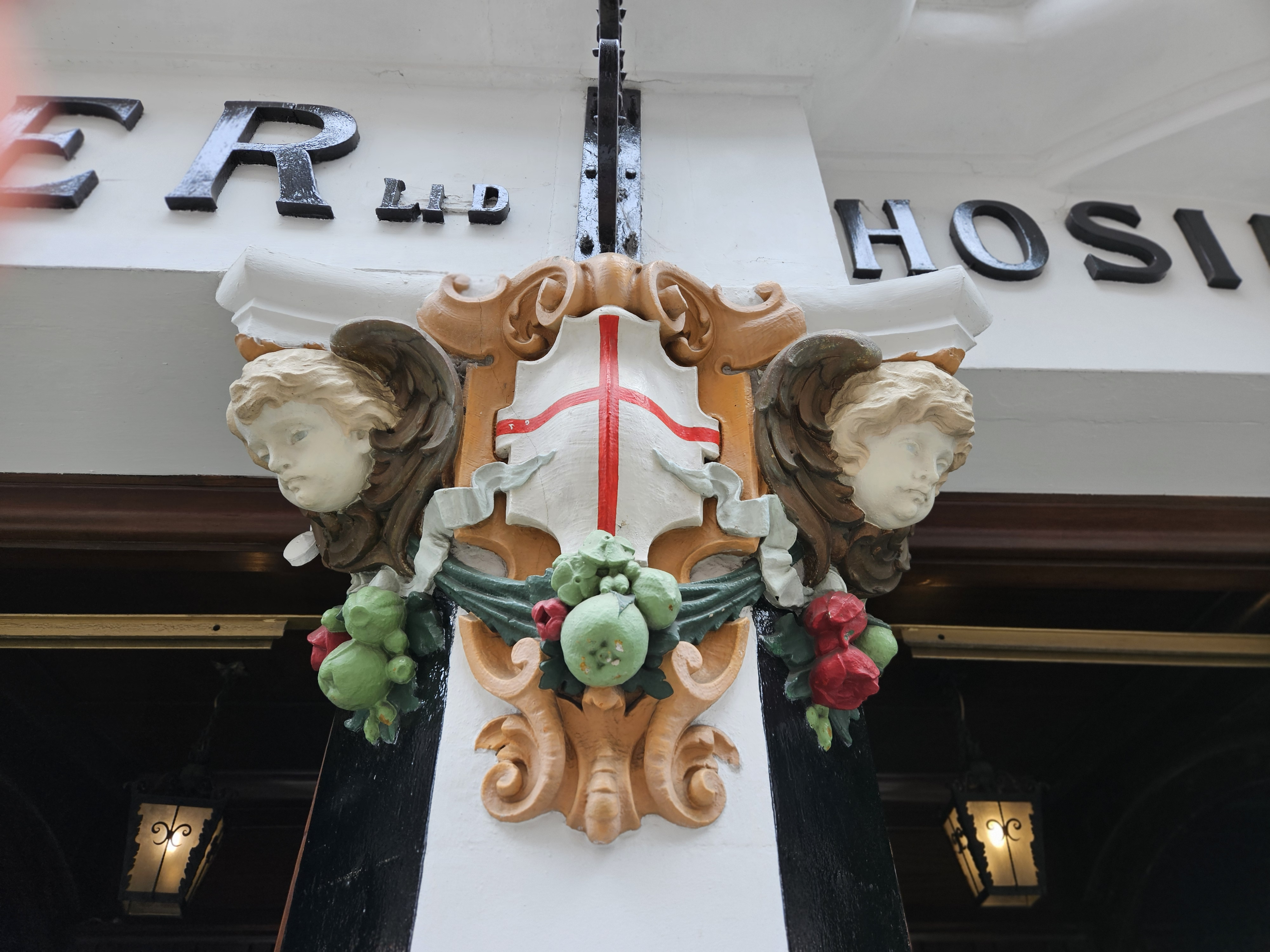
Shield detail on Turnbull and Asser shop on Jermyn Street, 2024

Charles III has been purchasing shirts from Turnbull & Asser since his youth. When, in 1980, the then Prince of Wales was granted the power of bestowing royal warrants, his first issue was granted to Turnbull & Asser. He also wears Turnbull & Asser suits, made by the former Chester Barrie factory in Crewe, Cheshire. Following the retirement of Paul Cuss, the Royal Warrant was passed down to Steven Quin from 1999 to 2024, followed by James Cook, who serves as the current Royal Warrant holder.

== See also ==
- Crockett & Jones
- G Ettinger Ltd.
- Floris of London
- James Bond
- Jermyn Street
- Kingsman (franchise)
