= The White Company (retailer) =

Home and clothing retailer

The White Company (U.K.) Limited
- Trade name: The White Company
- Type: Private
- Industry: Retail
- Founded: 5 December 1994; 31 years ago
- Headquarters: Television Centre, London, England
- Number of locations: 70 stores, clearance stores, and concession stores
- Area served: United Kingdom; Republic of Ireland; United States; Jersey
- Key people: Chrissie Rucker (Founder & Chairman); Jo Jenkins (CEO)
- Revenue: ▲£278 million (2022)
- Net income: ▲£27 million (2022)
- Owner: Bectin Limited
- Number of employees: ▲1,725 (2022)
- Parent: The White Company Holding Co Limited
- Website: thewhitecompany.com

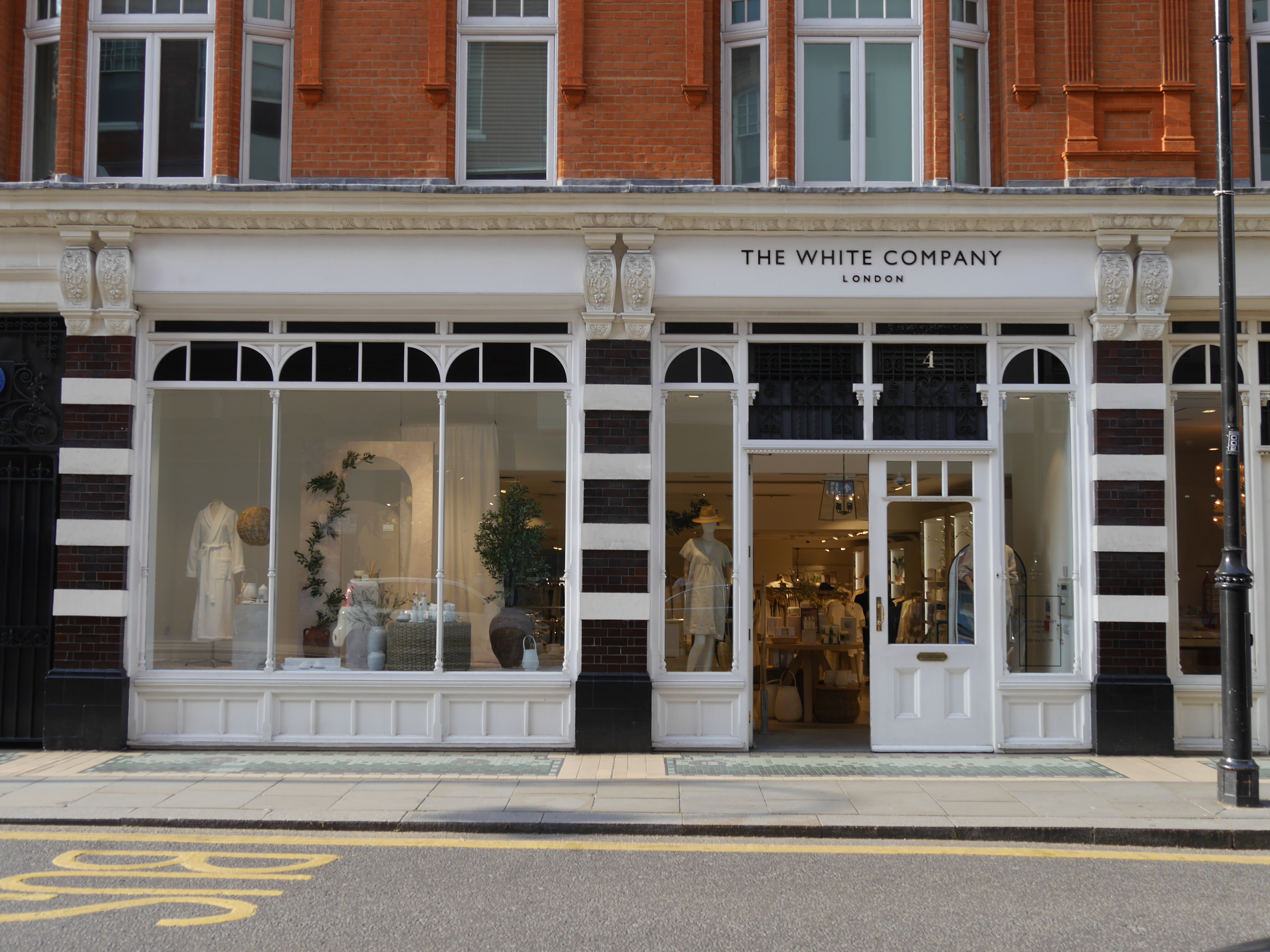
The White Company's store, Symons Street, London in April 2022.

The White Company (U.K.) Limited, trading as the White Company, is a retailer of bedroom, home, clothing, and fragrance goods, whose 32,000-square-foot (3,000-square-metre) head office is located at Television Centre, London.

It was founded by Chrissie Rucker in 1994. Mary Homer left Topshop in March 2017 to head the company.

== History ==
The White Company was established in 1994 as a mail order business selling items through a 12-page catalogue which has grown into a multi-channel, international business. Started up with a small government grant and £6,000 inheritance, it originally had a 500 people mailing list. Chrissie Rucker managed to gather some editorial coverage – including the Financial Times – and press releases which led to it making £80,000 in the first year, just breaking even.

Originally encompassing products including sheets, covers and pillows, it later expanded into home décor, dinnerware, fragrances, candles, furniture and clothing. A children's division called The Little White Company was later added.

In 2017, the company's products were chosen to outfit the business and first class of British Airways' planes.

== Locations ==
As of May 2022, The White Company has 70 stores, clearance stores, and concession stores.

They have 61 UK stores, including concessions and clearance stores, 6 US concessions, 2 Irish stores—1 of which is a clearance store, and 1 Jersey concession.

The American concessions are located in Nordstrom stores, while the UK concessions are situated in a variety of retailers, including: Harrods and 3 Selfridges sites—Oxford Street, the Bullring, and the Trafford Centre.

The White Company also has a number of stores in UK shopping centres, including: Westfield London and Westfield Stratford City, Bluewater, Liverpool One, and Meadowhall.

They opened their first shop in London's Symons Street.
