= Peal and Company Limited =

Defunct British shoe manufacturer

Peal & Co
- Company type: Privately held company
- Industry: Manufacturing & Retail
- Founded: 1565/1791
- Founder: Samuel Peal
- Headquarters: Stepney Green, London, England
- Products: Shoes & Boots

Peal & Co (Peal and Company Limited) manufactured English shoes from 1565 until 1965. The once successful British firm catered to a variety of notable individuals and moved locations several times over the years before it was purchased by Foster & Sons. Brooks Brothers uses the marque today for boots and shoes manufactured in England, typically Northampton, and sold in their stores.

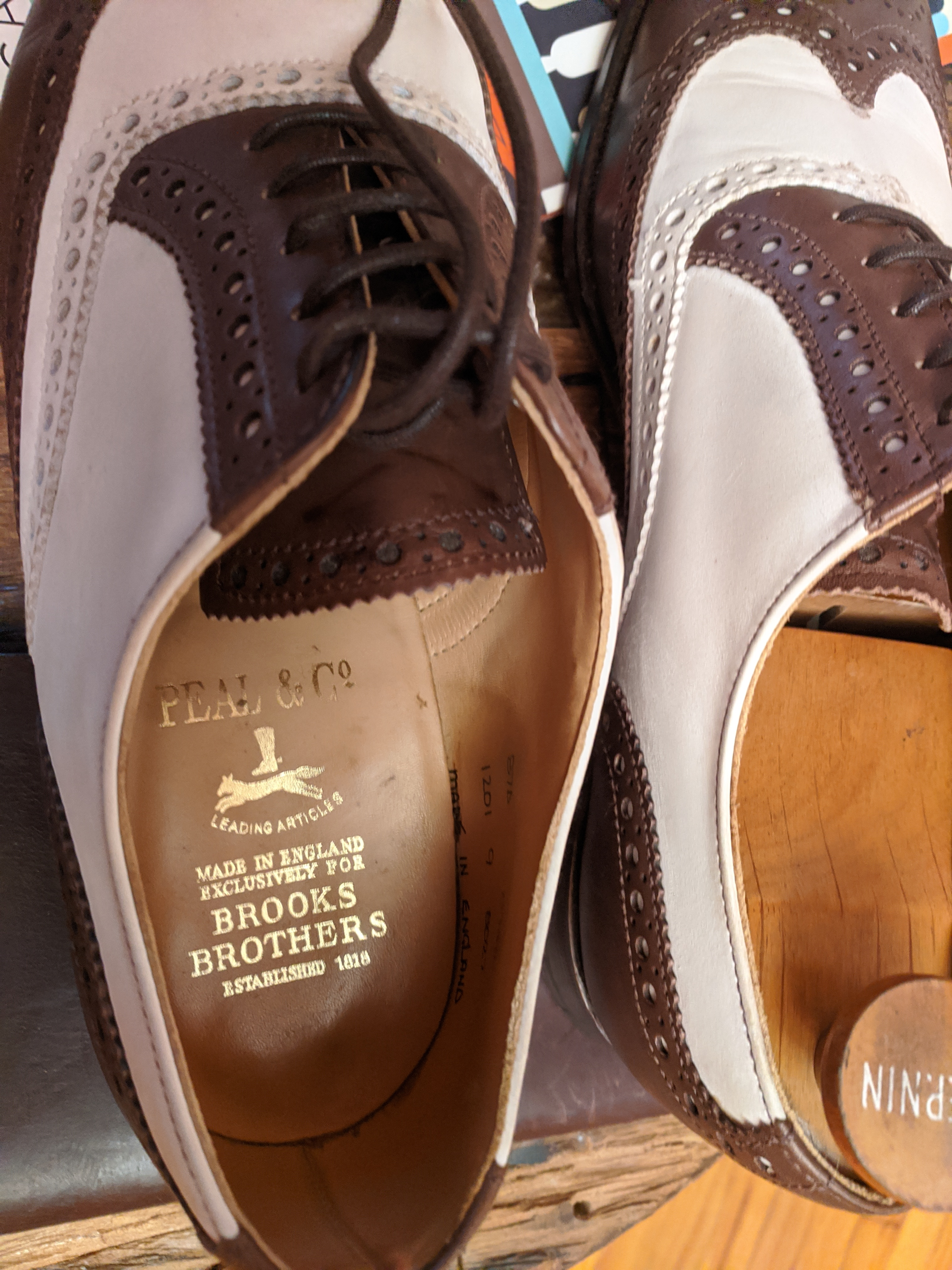
Peal & Co Spectator Special Edition for Great Gatsby (2013)

Peal & Co traces its founding back to 1565, according to documents from the London Metropolitan Archives, but the company name does not appear until 1791. The company describes its history as "the oldest-established and most successful makers in the world" when it existed in Durham and Derby, before it moved to London in 1791. Brooks Brothers purchased the name in 1965 and used it for its premium line of shoes.

Peal & Co existed as an unnamed English bootmaker from 1565 until 1761 when the company moved to Durham. The named founder, Samuel Peal, moved his cordwaining manufacturing operation from Derby to London in 1791 and named the company Peal & Co. With over 200 employees, Samuel Peal's company became one of the largest, most prestigious, and most productive of London's nineteenth-century manufacturers. Samuel developed a method for waterproofing shoes using a solution of Indian rubber to coat the leather with a thin, protective layer. London's wet climate ensured his success.

The company employed six generations of Peals, with the son of Samuel, Nathaniel Peal, apprenticing with his father before finding his own success as the steward of the company. His handcraft was selected for the Great Exhibition of 1851. The company's shoes continued to serve as exemplars for the British style and the durability of British manufacturers into the twentieth century. The cordwainers became known for their elegant lasts and royalty and celebrities alike purchased custom-made Peal & Co shoes. The company's records count Hugh Trevor-Roper, Fred Astaire, Gary Cooper, Rex Harrison, Cary Grant, Humphrey Bogart, Barry Goldwater, Conde Nast, Teddy Roosevelt, JFK, Laurence Olivier, Charles Chaplin, and many others amongst their clients.

Brooks Brothers has used the company's logo to sell British shoes after the company closed its doors in 1965. Brooks Brothers has sold Cheaney & Sons, Church's, Edward Green, Crockett & Jones, Alfred Sargent, and Loake Brothers shoes under the name Peal & Co.

== See also ==
- Alden Shoe Company
- Allen Edmonds
- Church's
- Crockett & Jones
- Edward Green & Co.
- Johnston & Murphy
- Loake
