= Sanders & Sanders Ltd. =

English luxury shoe brand

Sanders (officially Sanders & Sanders Ltd.) is a family business and luxury English shoe brand. It was first established as Sander Bros in 1873 by William and Thomas Sanders in Rushden, Northamptonshire.

Sanders & Sanders is run by the fifth generation of the family in the same factory on Spencer Road that they've been in since 1924, which was rebuilt after the original was destroyed by fire.

== In popular culture ==
In Spectre, James Bond wears a pair of Sanders snuff suede hi-top chukka boots.

Daniel Craig subsequently bought multiple pairs of the brand's shoes.

== See also ==
- Church's
- Crockett & Jones
- Alden Shoe Company
