= Montello Heel =

American shoe manufacturer

Montello Heel Mfg., Inc.
- Type: Family-owned, private
- Industry: Footwear and boot component manufacturing
- Founded: 1908
- Founder: Daniel Waldo Field
- Headquarters: 13 Emerson Avenue, Brockton, Massachusetts, U.S.
- Key people: John Alden Pearson (first Pearson generation); Richard Pearson (president); Brian Pearson (owner, since 2026)
- Products: Heels, leather soles and other footwear and boot components (for dress shoes, ice skates, cowboy boots and work boots); parts for shoe-repair businesses
- Number of employees: About 25 (2017)

Montello Heel Mfg., Inc. (also referred to as the Montello Heel Company) is a family-owned manufacturer of shoe and boot components located at 13 Emerson Avenue in Brockton, Massachusetts. It specializes in heels and soles made from leather and leatherboard and has operated in the same four-story building since its founding in 1908. The company was founded by Daniel Waldo Field and has been owned by the Pearson family since 1959. It is one of the few remaining shoe-related manufacturers in Brockton, a city long nicknamed the "shoe capital of the world" or "Shoe City."

== History ==
=== Founding ===
Montello Heel was founded in 1908 by Daniel Waldo Field, a prominent Brockton businessman, to supply the heels for his own shoemaking firm. Field had opened a separate shoemaking firm in the city in 1881, after having worked as a clerk. The company has continued in the same four-story building on Emerson Avenue, which has not undergone major renovation.

=== Pearson family ownership ===
The Emerson Avenue site has been operated by the Pearson family since 1959. A 2008 report described the company as "run by the Pearson clan for the past 50 years." Company president Richard Pearson, a 1962 graduate of Brockton High School and a resident of Bridgewater, has led the business with his son Brian Pearson as vice president. In a January 2026 report, Brian Pearson was described as having purchased the company from his father on January 15, 2026, completing a transition to a third-generation family business, and his grandfather John Alden Pearson was reported to have "started at" Montello Heel. In 2017 the company was described as "one of the last shoe-related companies" remaining in Brockton, with about 25 employees, roughly half of whom had come from Cape Verde.

=== Context: Brockton's shoe industry ===
Brockton, then called North Bridgewater, became a major center for shoe and boot production in the 19th century, helped by the development of mechanical shoemaking, including the shoe-lasting and left-right-last inventions associated with Lyman Blake and Chandler Sprague. During the American Civil War, the local industry supplied boots to the Union army, and Brockton was reported as the country's largest producer of shoes. At its peak around 1907, the industry employed about 15,000 workers. The city had 91 shoe factories by the turn of the 20th century, and by 1919 the 39 remaining shoe manufacturers employed roughly 13,000 workers.

The industry began to decline in the 1930s as the Great Depression reduced consumer demand and as shoe manufacturers relocated to the South and the Midwest in search of cheaper labor and closer access to leather supplies. By 1964, only 10 shoe factories remained in Brockton, employing about 2,000 workers, and by the 1970s the number of complete-footwear makers in the city had fallen to two or three, with FootJoy the last remaining such producer. In 2009, FootJoy closed its Brockton plant, which ended the production of complete footwear in the city. At that time, Montello Heel operated alongside the Barbour Corporation (and, at that time, Rextrude) as one of the last firms continuing to produce shoe-related products in Brockton.

== Products and customers ==
Montello Heel produces heels, leather soles and other components for men's dress shoes, as well as components used in ice skates, cowboy boots and work boots, and also sells parts to shoe-repair businesses. By 2008, the company was providing components to footwear makers such as Alden Shoe, Allen Edmonds, Titleist-FootJoy, Lucchese Boot Company and Tony Lama Boots. By 2017, its customer base had grown to 35 accounts, and its clients included Allen Edmonds, Alden of New England and the Frye Company. The company had also acquired molding equipment from shoe companies that closed around the 1990s, which helped it adjust to shifts in market demand, including a renewed demand for older-style footwear.
