= Brothel creeper =

Shoe with a thick crepe sole

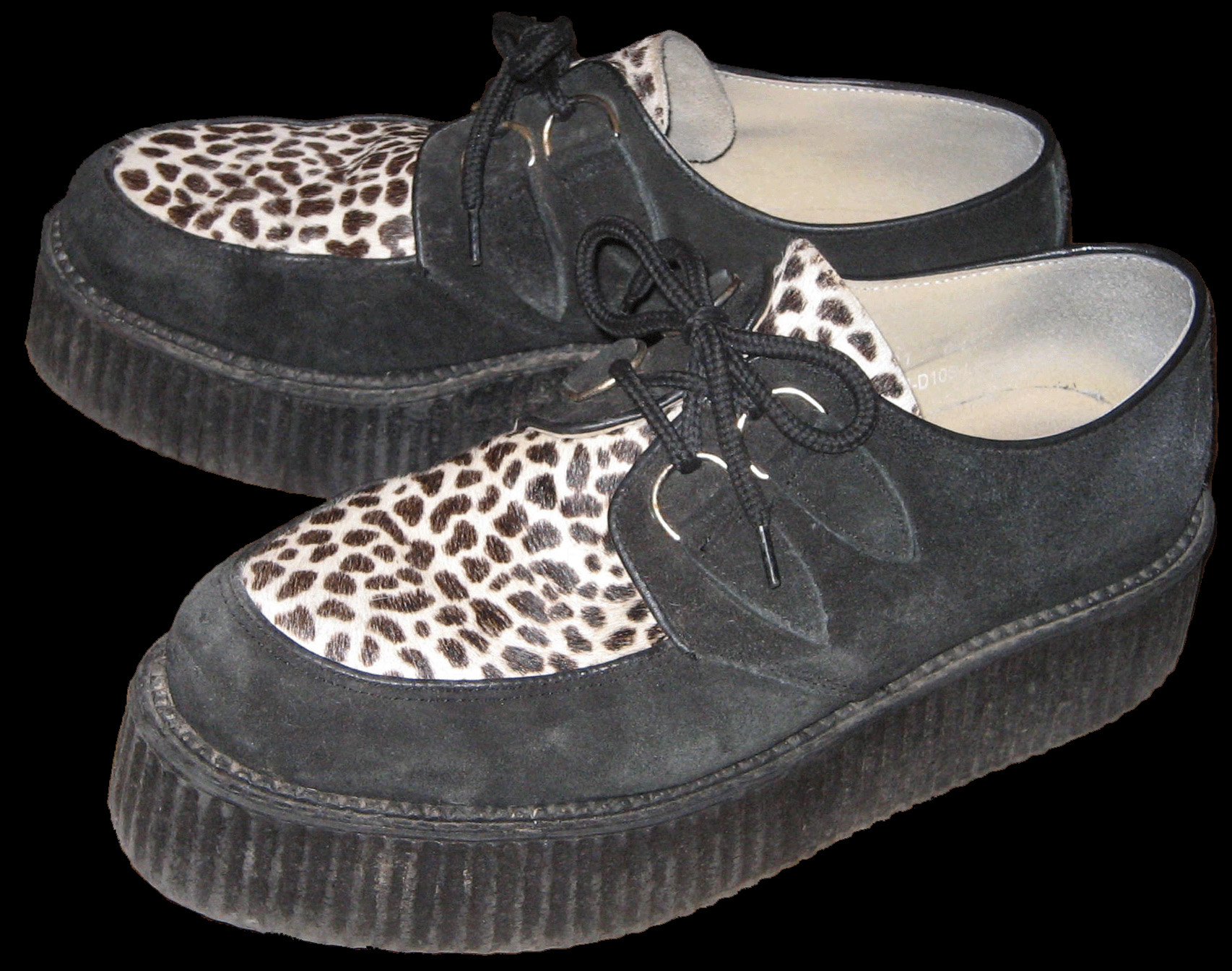
- A pair of "double sole" creepers
- Type: Shoe
- Material: Crepe rubber and suede
- Place of origin: Wellingborough
- Manufacturer: George Cox Limited

Brothel creepers, sometimes shortened to creepers, are a style of shoe that has thick crepe rubber soles, often in combination with suede uppers. This style of footwear became fashionable in the years following World War II, seeing resurgences of popularity at various times since then.

== History and origins of the name ==
A version of this style of shoe became popular with World War II soldiers in North Africa, who adopted suede boots with hard-wearing crepe rubber. Writing in The Observer in 1991, John Ayto put the origin of the name 'brothel creeper' to the wartime years. The Smithsonian suggests the crépe in the thick sole may have given the shoes the title creeper. It may also be associated with a Ken Mackintosh dance tune popular in 1953 called "The Creep".

This style of thick soled shoe was first developed commercially in 1949 by George Cox Limited of Wellingborough, Northamptonshire, England, and marketed under the "Hamilton" name, based on George Cox Jr.'s middle name. Initially they came in shades of blue, ranging from pastel shades to electric blue, and were made of suede or polished leather. Later, more extravagant patterned versions were created. George Cox's website shows a 1950s advertisement which gave the names of the first creepers as the 'Dace' (first introduced in 1949), 'Elton', 'Epsom', 'Walsall', and 'Winchester'. Only the Epsom was offered in brown suede.

=== Teddy Boys ===
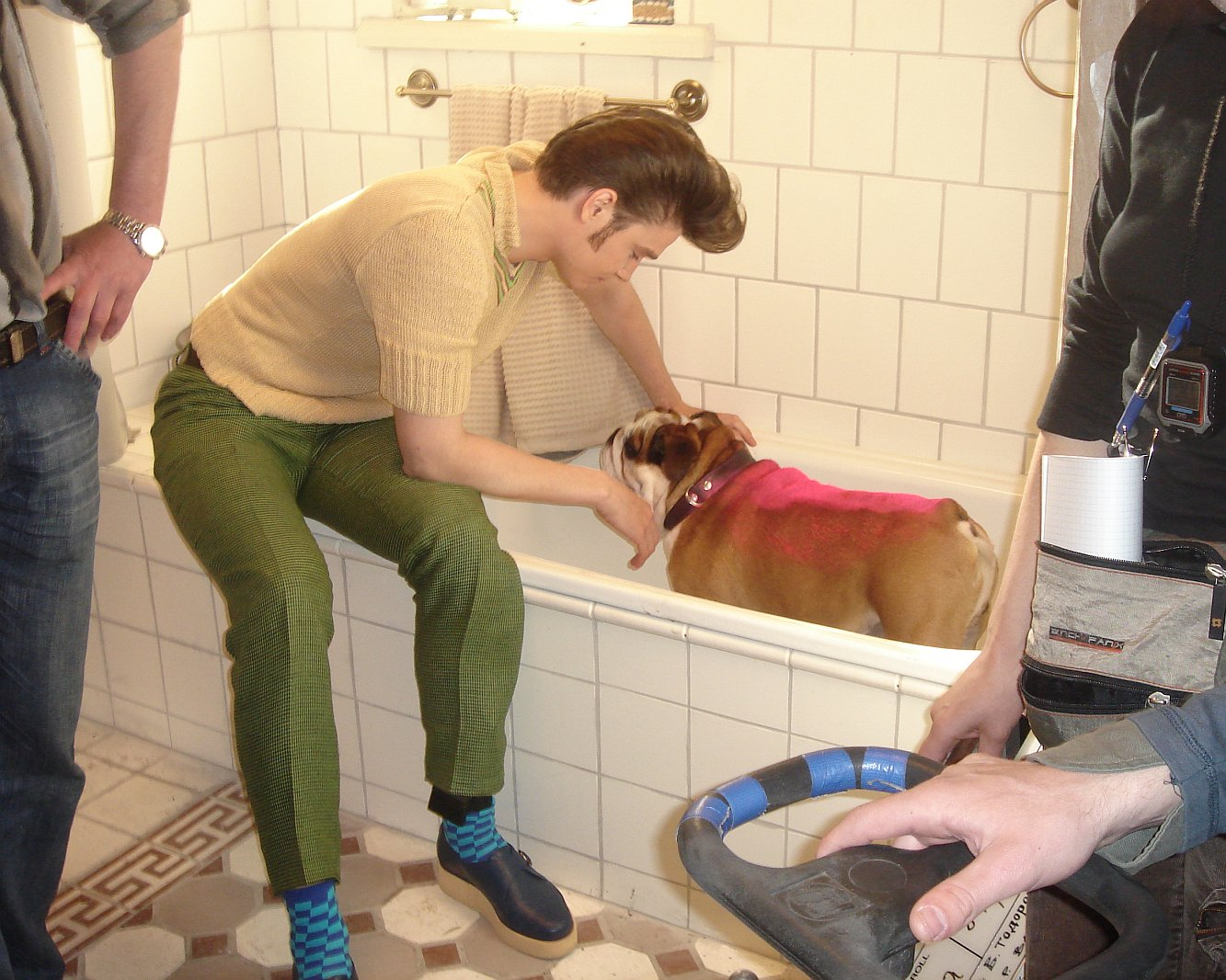
Maksim Matveyev wearing ботинки на манной каше (home-made brothel creepers) while shooting the 2008 musical Stilyagi

The shoes were taken up by the Teddy Boys–along with drainpipe trousers worn with exposed socks and drape jackets.

=== Bikini boys ===
The Bikini boys youth subculture in post-war communist Poland of the 1940s and 1950s was famous for their adaptation of brothel creepers (often made by local cobblers attaching thick rubber sole to regular normal footwear). The Polish slang term for this type of shoes was "shoes on slanina" (buty na słoninie) due to the thick white soles resembling slabs of slanina, which was a popular traditional food in Poland.

=== Punk, rock and later revivals ===
The shoe has since been adopted by subcultures such as indie, ska, punks, new wavers, psychobillys, greasers, goths and Japanese visual kei, and have been worn by Bananarama, the Cure frontman Robert Smith and Saffron, singer of Republica.

=== Puma Creepers by Rihanna ===
In 2015, Puma and Rihanna launched a collaborative shoe line called the Puma Creeper, which won an award for Shoe of the Year in 2016.

== See also ==
- List of shoe styles
