= Crepe (disambiguation) =

A crepe is a pancake.

Crepe, crêpe may also refer to:

- Crêpe, a woven fabric
- Crepe, a musical act associated with The Embassy (band)
- Crepe myrtle or crape myrtle, common names for Lagerstroemia, a genus of trees and shrubs
- Crêpe paper, a paper
- Crepe rubber, used to make soles for shoes and other rubber products
- Crepe (EP), 2020 EP by Irama
  - "Crepe" (song), 2020 song by Irama
