= Crockett & Jones =

English shoe manufacturing company

Crockett and Jones Limited
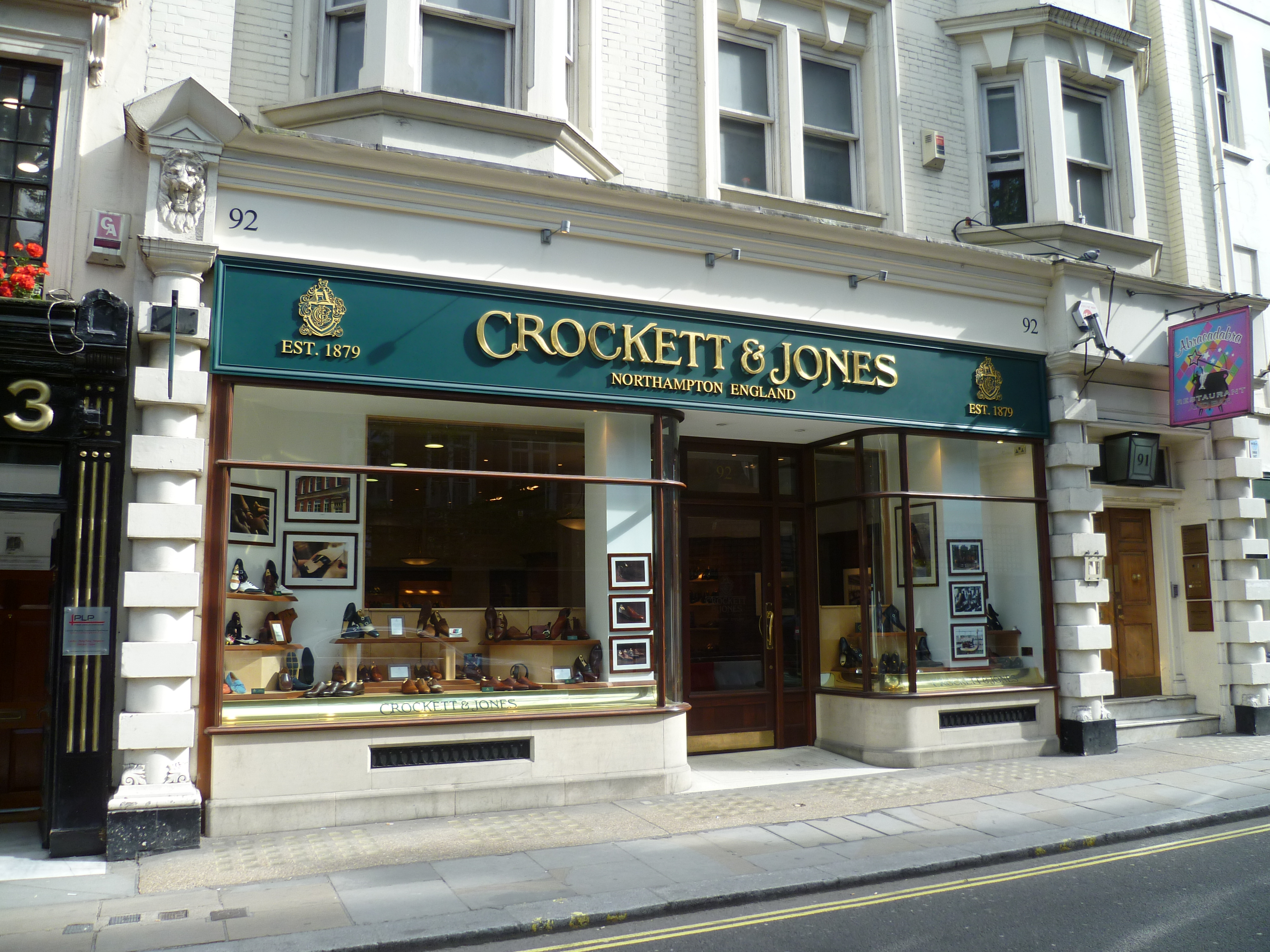
- Flagship shop at 92 Jermyn Street, London
- Trade name: Crockett & Jones
- Type: Private limited company
- Industry: Shoemaking
- Founded: 1879; 147 years ago
- Founders: James Crockett; Charles Jones
- Headquarters: Northampton, England
- Products: Goodyear-welted footwear
- Owner: Jones family
- Website: crockettandjones.com

Crockett & Jones is a British shoe manufacturing company that was established in 1879 by James Crockett and Charles Jones in Northampton, England. They were able to establish the company with a grant from the Thomas White Trust. The company specialises in the manufacture of Goodyear-welted footwear. It is currently being run by the great-grandson of its co-founder, Charles Jones. Crockett & Jones produces both men's and women's footwear, with three collections offered for men (Hand Grade Collection, Main Collection and Shell Cordovan Collection), and a limited range of boots and low-heeled shoes produced for women.

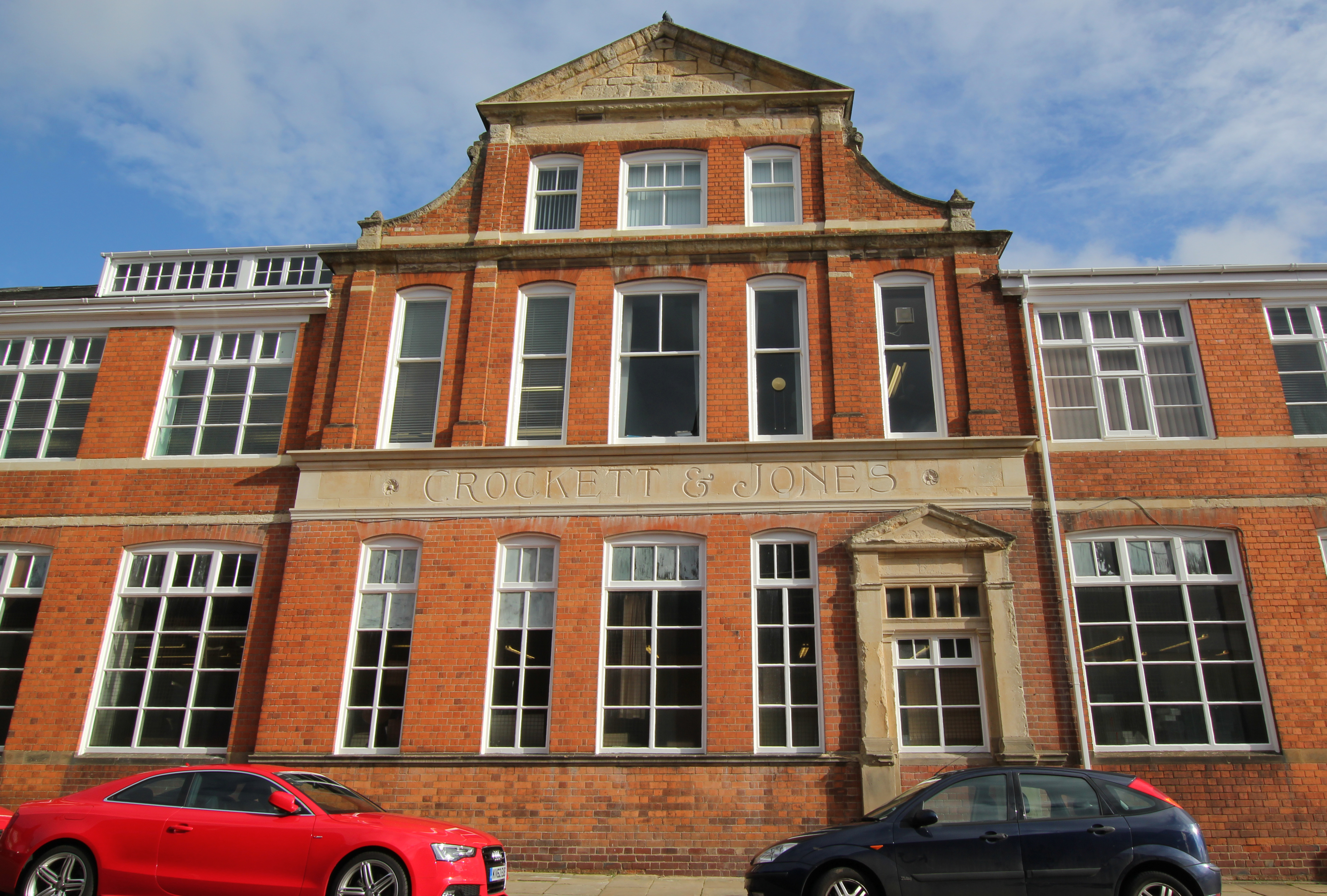
Crockett & Jones factory, view from Magee Street

== History ==
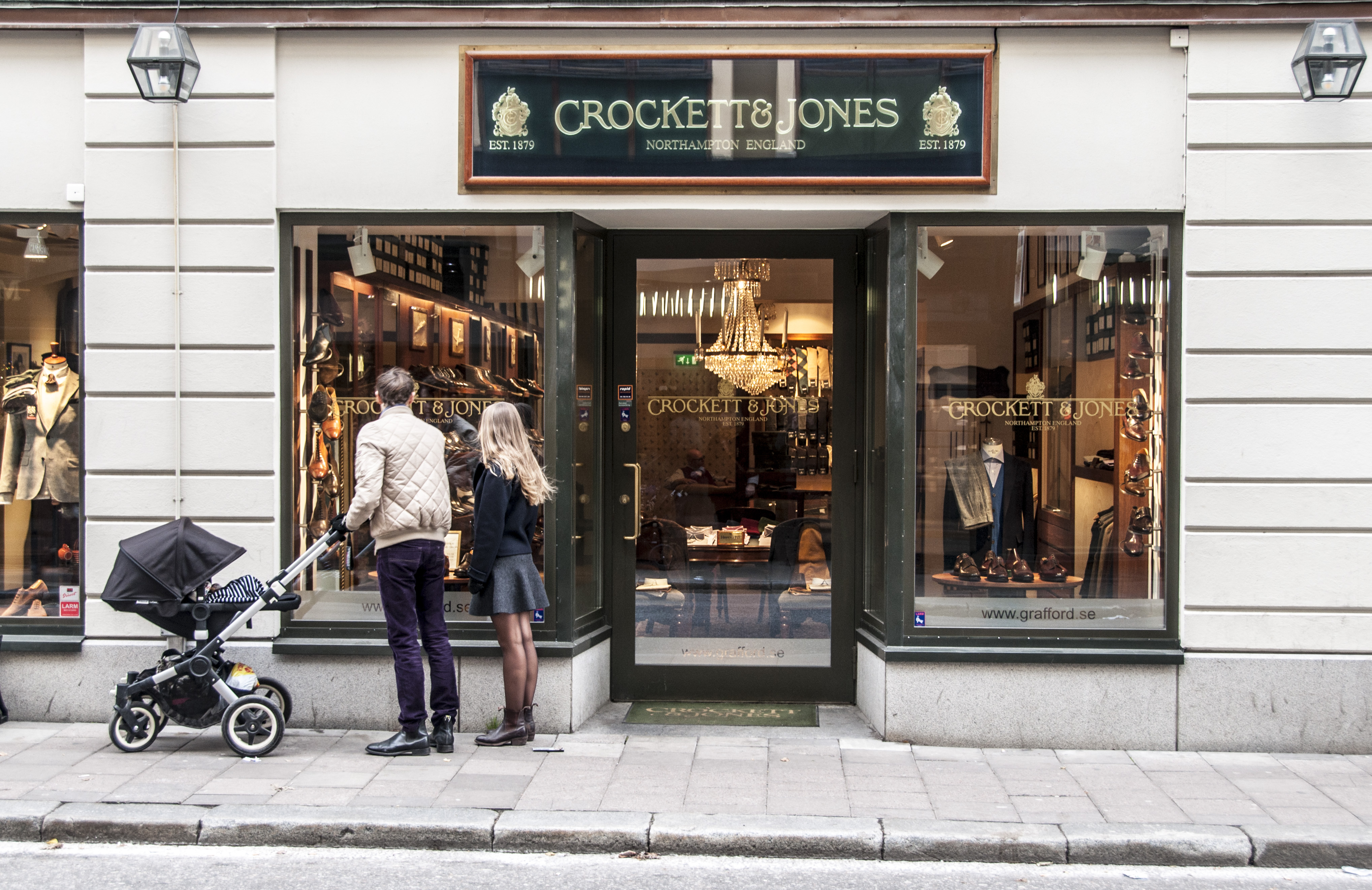
A Crockett & Jones store in Stockholm, Sweden

Northampton is traditionally known for shoe-making, which was one reason for setting up the factory there in 1879. At the start of operations, the firm produced men's boots. In the 1890s, the second generation of Harry Crockett and Frank Jones began to modernise with more advanced machinery, particularly equipment produced by Charles Goodyear. It produced shoes at a faster rate with lighter manual work.

In 1897, Crockett and Jones expanded into a larger factory and purchased the facility, which is still in use by the company. In the 1910s, the company began exporting a large part of its production to Australia, Argentina, South Africa, the US, and the Far East, though the UK remained its principal market.

In the 1930s, run by the third generation of the founders and still a family business, production reached 15,000 pairs of shoes each week. The majority of them were women's boots and shoes. They also contributed to the 1940s war effort, producing over a million pairs of officers' boots. The company stopped production of its usual footwear during that time.

The company has continued to evolve and absorb the changes necessary to make it competitive, while still maintaining a high-quality product. This is where all operations for the company take place, including production, design, and development. The factory in Perry Street, Northampton, dates back to the 1890s, with additions to the main building in 1910 and 1935, giving a large internal working space. It has a large proportion of glass to give good natural lighting throughout the building and a pleasant working environment, but it can get rather cold in the winter and extremely warm in the summer.

In 1947, the grandson of Charles Jones, Richard Jones, joined the family company. In 1977, he was appointed Managing Director and is still involved with it today as acting chairman. Jonathan, Richard's son, also became involved with the family business in 1977. As at 2014, there were 11 Crockett & Jones retail shops and concessions based in London, Birmingham, Paris, Brussels and New York City. The shops provide a contemporary showcase for ready-to-wear footwear, including velvet slippers, driving shoes and accessories.

== In popular culture ==
Daniel Craig wears various Crockett & Jones shoes in the James Bond films.

In the TV series Succession, Tom Wambsgans introduces his assistant Greg Hirsch to the brand.

== Awards and honours ==
In 1911, Crockett & Jones received the Diploma D'Onore in Turin for the wholecut Albert Slipper.

== See also ==
- Church's
- Edward Green & Co.
- Loake
- Peal and Company Limited
