= Satra (disambiguation) =

Satra, Sätra or SATRA may refer to:

- SATRA, a research and technology centre formerly known as the Shoe and Allied Trade Research Association
- Sätra, a suburb of Stockholm, Sweden
- Satra, a trading company from the former Soviet Union
- Satra (Ekasarana Dharma), religious institutions in the Ekasarana Dharma sub-tradition of Vaishnavism
