= Veldskoen =

South African footwear

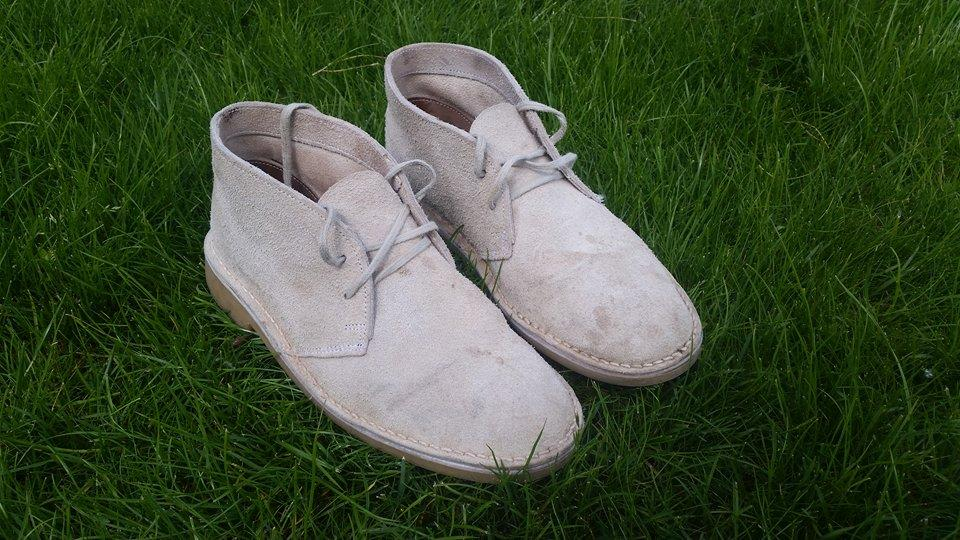
A pair of "vellies"

Veldskoene ("FELT-skoona") or colloquially vellies ("FELL-ys") are South African walking shoes made from vegetable-tanned leather or soft rawhide uppers attached to a leather footbed and rubber sole by a method known as stitchdown construction, done without tacks or nails.

== History ==
The name comes from Afrikaans vel ("skin"), later assimilated with veldt ("field"), and skoene ("shoes"). Their design is believed to be based on the traditional Khoisan footwear. The footwear was later embedded into the South African farming community when Velskoene were used as the footwear of choice. Easy to make, lightweight and extremely tough, Vellies became part of South African, Zimbabwean (previously Rhodesian) and Namibian and African culture.

Nathan Clark's shoe company, C&J Clark, made the desert boot famous, modeled after the same round toe and style of Veldskoene. Clark was inspired by the shape and design of Veldskoene he discovered for sale in the bazars of Cairo, which were imported to Egypt from South Africa. At first desert boots were for the youths. In England, the mods wore them, in Paris, it was the art students and in America the beatniks stomped around in them. The boots became ubiquitous in Jamaica as part of the Rude Boy subculture. High fashion later reappropriated Clarks for fashion shoots in magazines, and runway shows.

They are sometimes considered light boots, and can essentially be considered a subset of chukka boots or desert boots although vellies tend to have a lower topline. Veldskoene soles are sometimes cut from old car tyres rather than crepe rubber; the leather used varies with local supply. In Namibia, kudu and seal leather is commonly used.

Wupperthal shoe factory, 1836, founded by Johann Leipoldt, provided work for many skilled craftsmen. The Wupperthal handsewn veldskoen (traditional soft suede shoes) were for nearly a century famous across South Africa for their comfort and good craftsmanship.

== See also ==
- List of shoe styles
