= To Boot New York =

American footwear brand

To Boot New York is an American shoe brand based in New York City founded and designed by Adam Derrick. The brand is sold at department stores and boutiques in the United States and Canada, and its own e-commerce site.

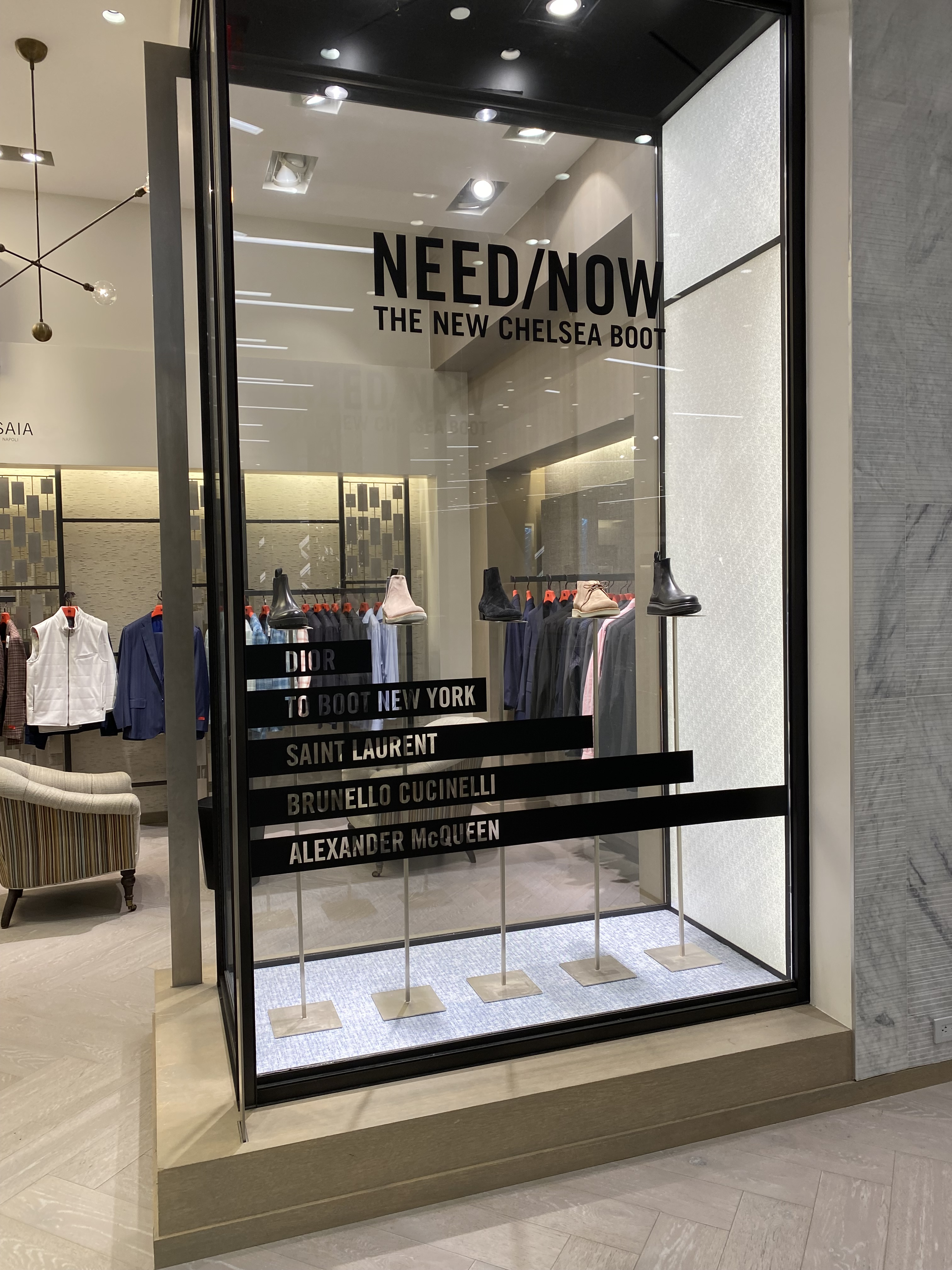
The To Boot New York brand featured at Saks Fifth Avenue, Brickell City Centre, Miami, 2022

== History ==
The brand's founder and designer is Adam Derrick, who lives in Chelsea, Manhattan. Derrick opened a cowboy boot store on Columbus Avenue, on New York's Upper West Side in 1979 when they were a fad, and before which time, according to him, New Yorkers has mostly never "liked, seen or worn" cowboy boots. After that trend subsided, thinking about what products to pursue next, Derrick travelled to Italy, "falling in love" with the footwear in that country. He started apprenticing at shoe factories, and thus learned about men's shoes and their construction, notably the detailed artisanship. He began producing men's shoes especially for his store, "To Boot" in New York, which was a success, after which upscale department stores Bergdorf Goodman, Nordstrom and Saks Fifth Avenue began buying his product wholesale and retailing it. Harry Rosen and Nordstrom retail the brand in Canada.

The brand competed successfully against "Park Avenue" brands like Allen Edmonds with its American-made shows in the $600 range, with Italian-made shoes in the $300–350 range. The Italian-made products were generally lighter and sleeker, and seemed more modern, but not as high quality. Average shoppers couldn't distinguish the quality of the "Park Avenue" products and chose the cheaper, but more on-trend product.

All products are made in Italy. The brand name includes "New York" which Derrick regards as the fashion capital of the U.S. and a "crossroads of fashion" on a global scale.

In 2018 the company started offering extended sizes on its e-commerce website.

In 2023 Nordstrom department store's Manhattan location remodeled its men's shoe department and started offering an extended selection of To Boot New York styles.

== In popular culture ==
In 2015, Andy Samberg wore To Boot New York sneakers as a guest on Late Night with Seth Meyers. Other celebrities spotted wearing the brand to events include Michael Strahan, Matt McGorry of Orange Is the New Black and How to Get Away with Murder, Corey Stoll of Ant-Man and House of Cards, and Jake Robinson of American Odyssey.
