= Bianca de la Garza =

American journalist

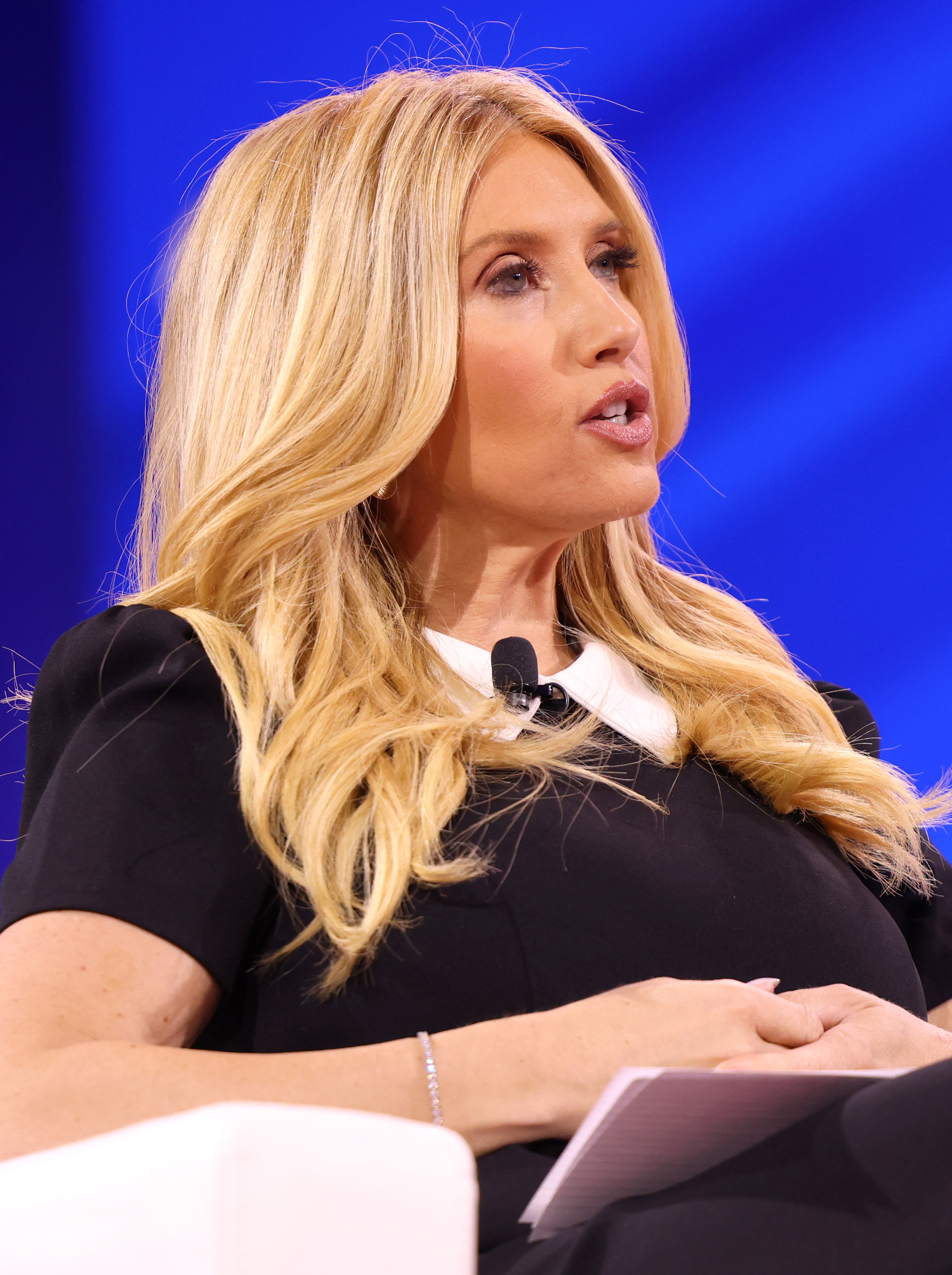
- Born: 1974 or 1975 (age 50–51)
- Education: Emerson College
- Occupations: Journalist, television personality
- Years active: 1997–current
- Television: Bianca
- Spouse: David Wade (1997-2009)
- Children: 1
- Website: biancadelagarza.com

Bianca de la Garza (born 1974/1975) is an American journalist, television personality, and founder of BDG Beauty. She has worked for WCVB, ABC, and Fox, among other television outlets.

She currently hosts Bianca Across the Nation on Newsmax.

== Education ==
De la Garza was raised on the South Shore of Massachusetts. Her father was an immigrant from Mexico and her mother was an international stewardess who piqued Bianca's interest in the world. She is a 1997 alumna of Emerson College.

== Early career ==
She began her television career in 1997 working for WTEN. In 2001, she became a news anchor at WFXT-TV. She created and is the host of the syndicated show Bianca.

=== WTEN ===
In 1997, days after graduating from Emerson College, de la Garza was working full-time on-air at WTEN, the ABC affiliate in Albany, New York. She was hired by WTEN news director Don Decker. De la Garza covered politics during Governor George Pataki's administration including Senate Majority leader Joe Bruno and former Speaker of the State Assembly Sheldon Silver, interviewing then-candidates Hillary Clinton and Chuck Schumer. De la Garza provided on-site coverage of the effects of an F3 tornado in Mechanicville, New York on May 31, 1998.

=== KGTV ===
In 1999 de la Garza joined KGTV the ABC affiliate in San Diego as a reporter and fill-in anchor. Establishing herself as a border correspondent interviewing smugglers and migrants along the Tijuana border and the meetings of then California Governor Grey Davis speaking with Mexico President Vicente Fox.

She received an award from the San Diego press club for her investigative reports on an illegal factory she uncovered for smuggling undocumented workers across the US border and locking them up overnight at their facility. That factory was raided by federal agents and shut down. She reported on illegal immigration along the US-Mexico border and human trafficking.

De la Garza covered the deadly school shooting on March 5, 2001, at Santana High School in Santee, California.

=== WFXT ===
In 2001 de la Garza returned east, joining Boston Fox affiliate WFXT as a reporter and lead weekend anchor. During her time there she garnered 5 Emmy nominations. In 2004, 2005, and 2006 she was nominated for outstanding anchoring.

In December 2001, she followed the trial and conviction of the "Shoe Bomber" Richard Reid, a British terrorist who boarded American Airlines Flight 63 between Paris and Miami December 22, 2001. de la Garza reported live from the United Nations Headquarters in New York City on February 5, 2003, covering the weapons of mass destruction speech delivered by Colin Powell. She traveled to Rome for her coverage of the Catholic Church sexual abuse cases.

=== WCVB ===
In 2007 de la Garza joined WCVB the ABC station in Boston. As the morning anchor, then adding noon show to her duties. She was at the helm for major local and global stories from the capture of Osama bin Laden to the Boston Marathon bombing. Her exclusive interview with a survivor of the Craigslist killer Philip Markoff was picked up nationally on ABC's Good Morning America and Inside Edition.

De la Garza received an Emmy nomination for her coverage of the Wedding of Prince William and Catherine Middleton in England. There she scored a world exclusive interview with Mohamed Al-Fayed in London, who gave candid remarks about his beliefs that the Royal Family was involved in the death of Princess Diana and his son Dodi. De la Garza covered several Super Bowls and World Series playoffs over a span of several years in Boston. She and her team joined Red Sox Player David Ortiz in commercials promoting Good Morning America.

== TV shows ==
De la Garza was guest on the Wendy Williams show. She had a cameo on the hit NBC TV show American Odyssey and a co-hosting guest spot on Hollywood Today Live with Ross Mathews.

=== Bianca Unanchored ===
De la Garza announced she would be leaving news media to start her own production company in 2014. Later that year she teamed up with Sony and Embassy Row Productions to produce a late night talk show to air in New England. It was announced the show would tape in front of a live audience in their Manhattan studios. She signed a distribution deal with several Hearst affiliates in New England to carry the show on Saturday night at 11:30pm. She secured Dunkin' Donuts as a launch sponsor. The show premiered January 24, 2015, on ABC stations as Bianca Unanchored. Her guests included Slash from Guns N' Roses and Dancing with the Stars' Tom Bergeron. One month after the premier, The Wrap stated "after four weeks, the new entry into the landscape has proven to be a ratings success."

In June 2015, it was announced that the show, the title of which had now been shortened to Bianca, had been picked up by CBS and CW affiliates.

The second season included guest Elizabeth Hurley and the last television interviews of writer Jackie Collins before her death. Despite talks to move the show to daytime the show wrapped in fall of 2015. De la Garza was nominated for three Emmys in the categories of outstanding program host, outstanding promotional spot and outstanding lifestyle program.

=== Beauty & Bubbles ===
In 2019 de la Garza created a talk show on the careers of those in the beauty and personal care industry, where celebrity stylists, manicurists and estheticians revealed how they worked with their A list clientele.

=== Newsmax ===
In 2021, de la Garza appeared as a guest host on Newsmax, and in January 2022, she announced she would co-anchor the midday show John Bachman Now. She later become the host of Newsline now called Newswire on Newsmax2 and then Bianca Across the Nation on Newsmax.

== Business ventures funded by Richard Hajjar ==
Beginning in 2014, Richard Hajjar, then the CFO of Alden Shoe Company, provided funding for several business ventures started by de la Garza, starting with the Bianca Unanchored show, then a skin-care line, and in 2019, a media company that produced Beauty & Bubbles and a reality TV docuseries. Hajjar gave de la Garza and her business enterprises over $17 million. By late 2019, Alden discovered Hajjar appeared to have been embezzling money from the company. Alden sued Hajjar, de la Garza, and de la Garza's businesses BDG Enterprises and Lucky Gal Productions in 2020, seeking to recover the money. In 2021, Hajjar plead guilty to wire fraud, unlawful monetary transactions, and filing a false tax return. That same year, De la Garza reached a confidential settlement with the company. Hajjar pled guilty to embezzlement, and was ordered to serve nearly six years in prison.

== Personal life ==
De la Garza met newscaster David Wade when they worked in Albany, New York for competing stations. They married and then had a daughter in 2005. In 2009, de la Garza and Wade announced the end of their marriage.
