= Chukka boot =

Style of footwear

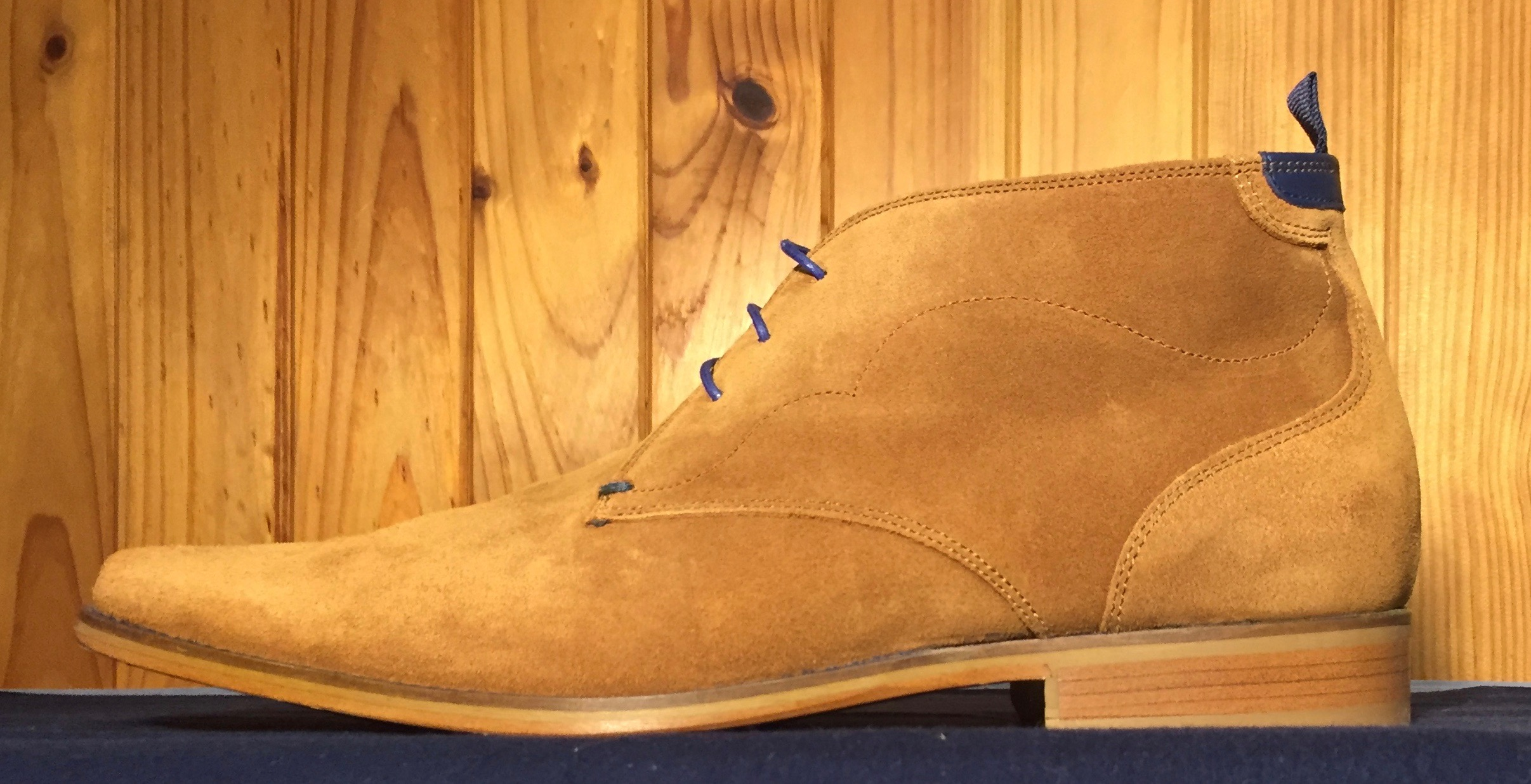
Chukka boot with leather sole

Chukka boots (/ˈtʃʌkə/) are ankle-high leather boots with suede or leather uppers, leather, wooden or rubber soles, and open lacing, with two or three pairs of eyelets. The name chukka possibly comes from the game of polo, where a chukka is a period of play. Originally, "chukka boot" referred to a form of desert boots worn by British soldiers stationed in India. Nowadays, however, they are very similar to the chelsea, only laces at the front. A number of shoe shops use the names chukka and chelsea for either boot.

== Materials and style ==
Chukkas are usually made from calfskin or suede, although they can be made from other materials. The style first became popular in the late 1940s through the 1960s as casual wear. In the 21st century, chukkas persist as a popular menswear shoe, particularly in the United Kingdom. They can be worn with both suits and more casual wear like jeans.

According to shoe historian June Swann, the essential chukka boot is ankle-high, open-laced, and unlined, with two to four pairs of eyelets, thin leather soles, calfskin suede uppers in two parts (each from a single piece of leather; quarters sewn on top of vamp), and rounded toes.

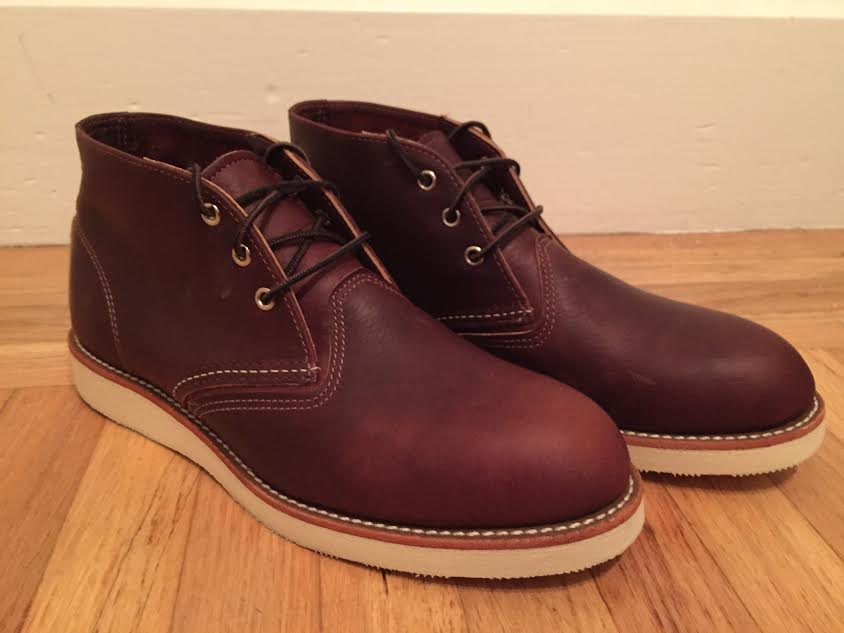
A variation on the classic chukka boot with wedge soles

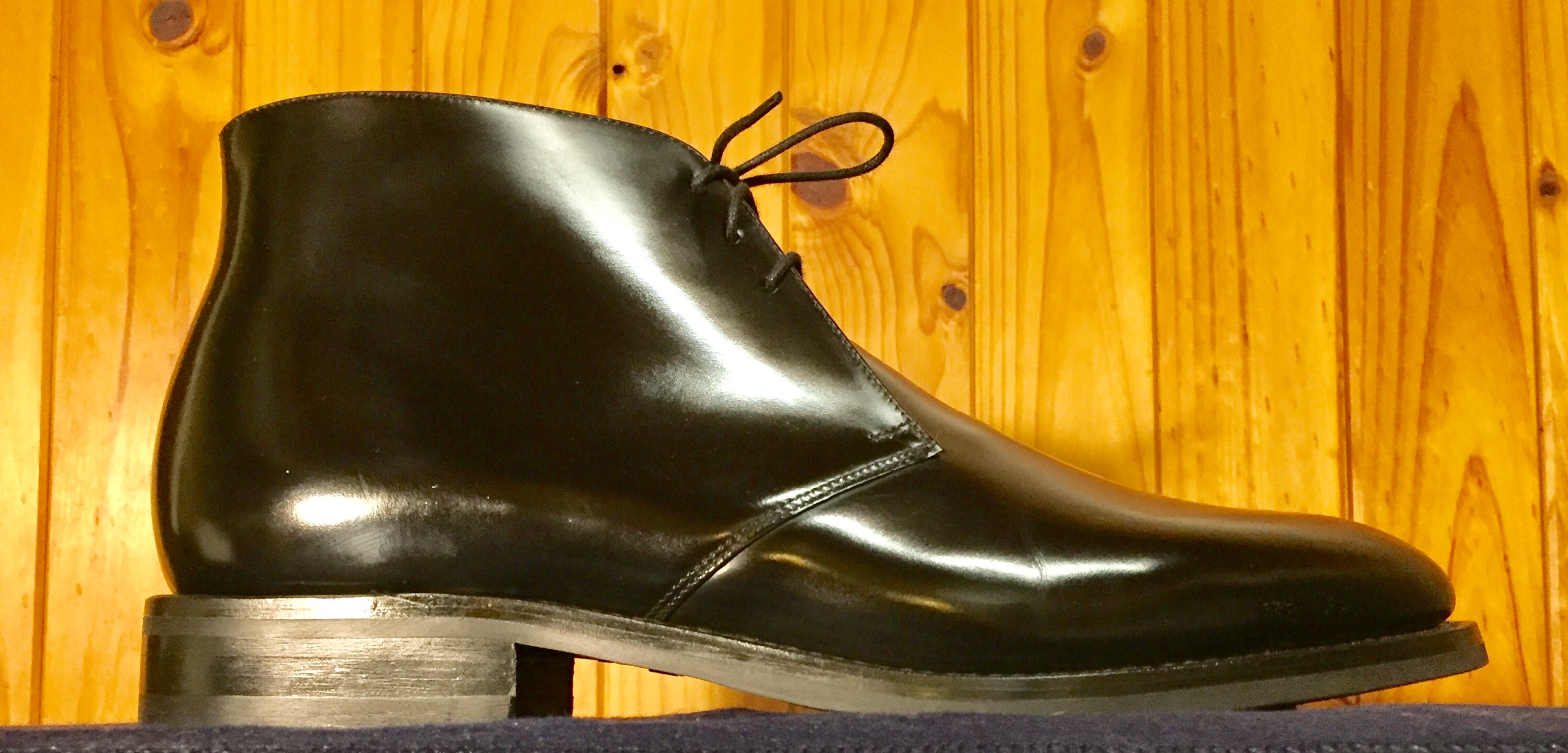
Loake "209" chukka boot, black leather

== Desert boot ==
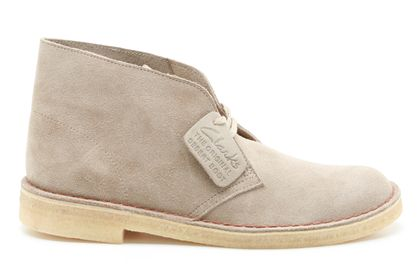
Clarks' Desert Boot

A desert boot is a chukka boot with crepe rubber soles and, typically, suede uppers. Desert boots were popularized in the 1950s by UK shoe company C. & J. Clark.

Desert boots were officially introduced to the world with the debut of the Clarks' Desert Boot at the 1949 Chicago Shoe Fair. After feature coverage in Esquire magazine, their popularity took off. According to Clarks, inspiration came from "the crepe-soled, rough suede boots made in Cairo's Khan el-Khalili bazaar for British Eighth Army officers."

These boots were based on the South African veldskoen which became a popular footwear item in Southern Africa due to their robust and simple design. Often being bought by soldiers for use in the various bush wars of the region, they have become popular across the world as "desert boots".

The year was 1941, and the soldier, well he wasn't just any infantryman, he was Nathan Clark, and he'd been sent to war with two missions. First and foremost to protect his country, and, secondly, to discover some new shoe designs for his family's company. As a member of the Eighth Army, Clark had been deployed to Burma, and it was here that he noticed that the officers in his formation were wearing these strange, sand colored chukkas during their downtime. Clark investigated the shoes and learned that they had originally been commissioned to Cairo cobblers by South African soldiers whose old-military issue boots had failed them out on the desert terrain. They wanted something that was both lightweight and grippy which led to creation of a boot with a suede upper on a crepe sole.

— Jake Gallagher, GQ, August 15, 2012

== See also ==
- Desert Combat Boot
- List of boots
- List of shoe styles
