= Church's =

High-end English footwear manufacturer

Church & Co Limited
- Company type: Private
- Industry: Shoemaking
- Founded: 1873; 153 years ago
- Founder: Thomas Church
- Headquarters: Northampton, England
- Products: Footwear and accessories
- Revenue: ▲€35 million (2023)
- Owner: Prada (1999–present)
- Website: church-footwear.com

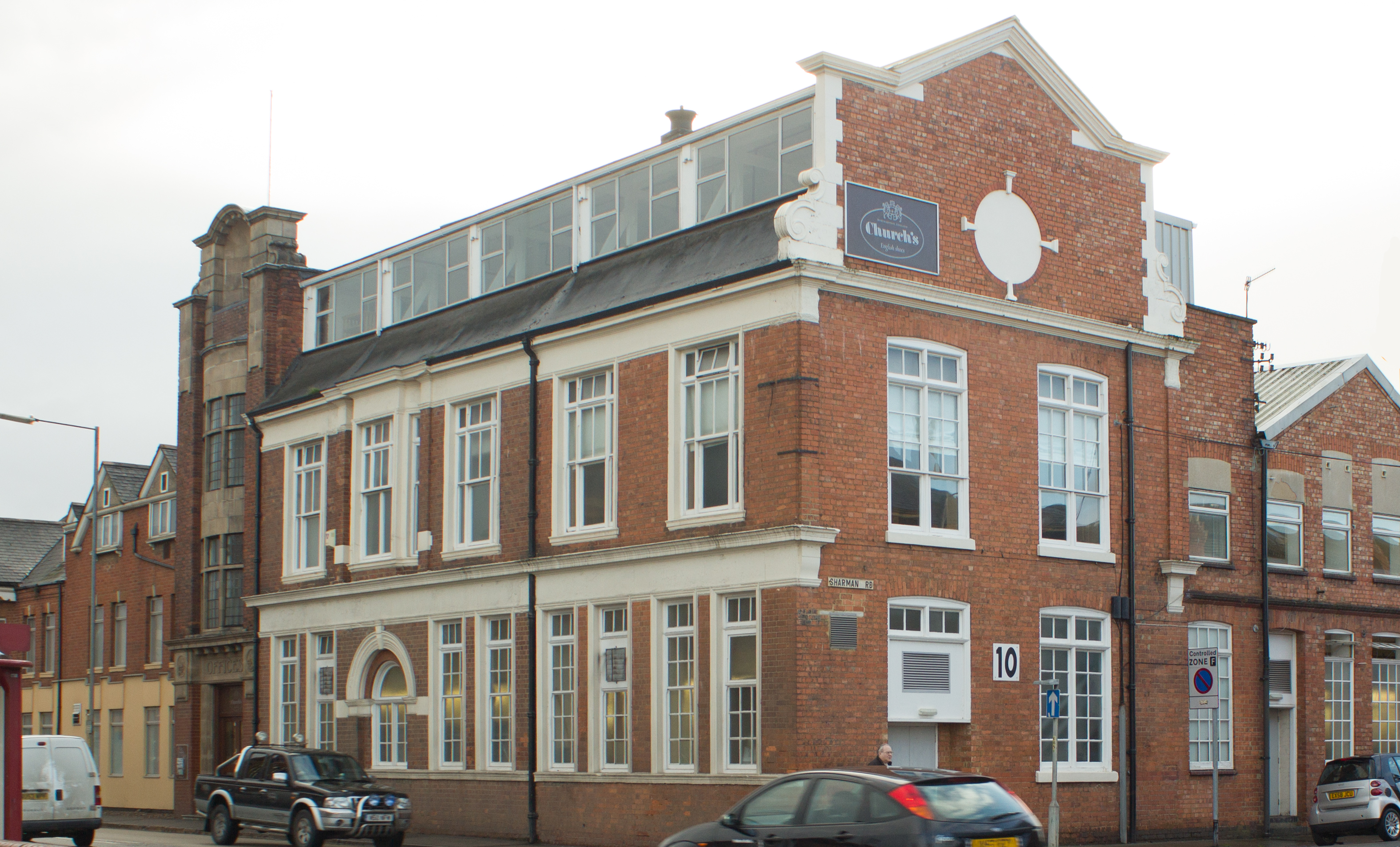
Church's works in St James Road, Northampton

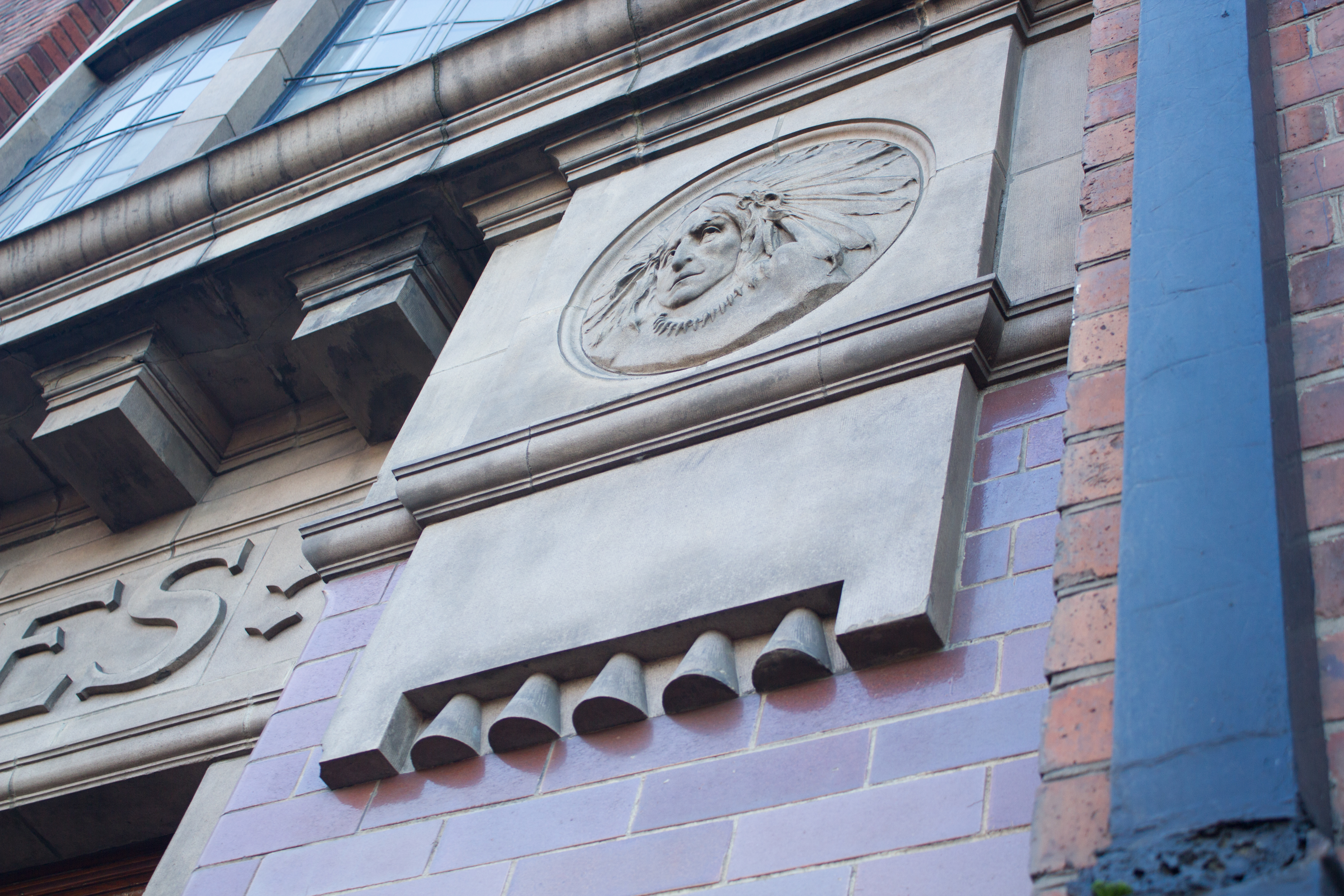
Native American Indian on the front office of the building - see St James End, Northampton

Church & Co Limited, branded Church's, is a luxury footwear manufacturer that was founded in 1873 by Thomas Church in Northampton, England. In 1999 the company was bought by Italian luxury fashion house Prada.

== Family ==
Three brothers Alfred, (John) William, and (Thomas) Dudley formed the company; their father Thomas died on 23 March 1905. The granddaughter of Dudley was the Olympic swimmer Elizabeth Church.

(Thomas) Dudley married Rhoda Wooding, daughter of Henry Wooding of Billing Road, at Victoria Road church on 3 January 1893.

Alfred died on Saturday 29 September 1928 aged 77. He lived on Cheyne Walk, and attended Abington Avenue Congregational Church, where his funeral was held. Alfred had attended the church with Walter Drawbridge Crick, grandfather of Francis Crick.

(John) William lived at Nine Springs Villa on Billing Road in Cliftonville, the former house of Walter Drawbridge Crick, until around 1928, when he moved to Leicester, where he died aged 76 on Thursday 10 January 1929.

== History ==
Between the two world wars, Church's became actively involved in the development of the footwear industry in general. In 1919, the British Boot, Shoe and Allied Trades Research Association was created with Church's as a founder-member. As a result of this partnership, the Northampton Technical College was established in 1925. This went on to become the University of Northampton in 2005.

The family business was taken over by Prada in 1999, in a US$170 million deal, and has since expanded its outlets overseas. In 2014 the company employed 650 people. The same year, Church's took over adjacent premises in St James Road, formerly a tram and later a bus depot, in anticipation of further expansion which was expected to create up to 140 more jobs.

Some have criticised Prada's management of Church's, citing a shift towards a fashion company moving away from traditional designs and workmanship resulting in gradual decrease of quality.

In 2016, the Company appointed a new CEO. Despite the openings of new luxury boutiques and the uplift of retail price, Church & Co reported losses and reduced the workforce in its plant in Northampton.

== Locations ==
Its main installations are located in the St James area of Northampton, with an estimated production capacity of 5,000 pairs per week, 70% of which are exported all over the world. Besides products sold to resellers and individual customers, the company has retail stores in Belgium, France, Italy, Japan, Singapore, Spain, Switzerland, and UK.

== Notable customers ==
British Prime Minister Tony Blair had a "lucky pair" of Church's black 310 brogues, which he wore to every session of Prime Minister's Questions for ten years.

On the ‘Joe and James Fact Up’ Podcast, hosted by Joe Thomas and James Buckley, if was revealed that Thomas wore a pair of Church’s shoes when he first met his wife, Hannah Tointon.

== In popular culture ==
During Pierce Brosnan's tenure as James Bond, various selections of dress shoes from the Church's range were used in production. Lindy Hemming, who was the costume designer, explained the choice of Church's shoes as having the appropriate weight to complement the silhouette of the tailored Brioni suits she had commissioned for Bond.

== See also ==
- Alden Shoe Company
- Allen Edmonds
- Sanders & Sanders Ltd.
- Crockett & Jones
