= Edward Green & Co. =

English shoemaker

- Industry: Fashion
- Founded: 1890; 135 years ago in Northampton, England
- Founder: Edward Green
- Products: Shoes
- Website: edwardgreen.com

Edward Green is an English shoemaker founded in 1890. Edward Green is based in Northampton, England. The level of handwork involved in production is very high and only around 250 pairs of shoes are completed a week.

During the 1930s, Edward Green was one of the largest manufacturers of officers' boots for the British Army. Their shoes have also been selected by such clients as the Duke of Windsor, Ernest Hemingway and Cole Porter.

Edward Green shoes are available from their own shops in Jermyn Street in London and on the Boulevard St Germain in Paris, as well as stores around the world such as Double Monk in Melbourne, Isetan in Japan, Matches in Wimbledon Village, Leffot in New York City, Tassels in Hong Kong and Unipair in Seoul.

== History ==
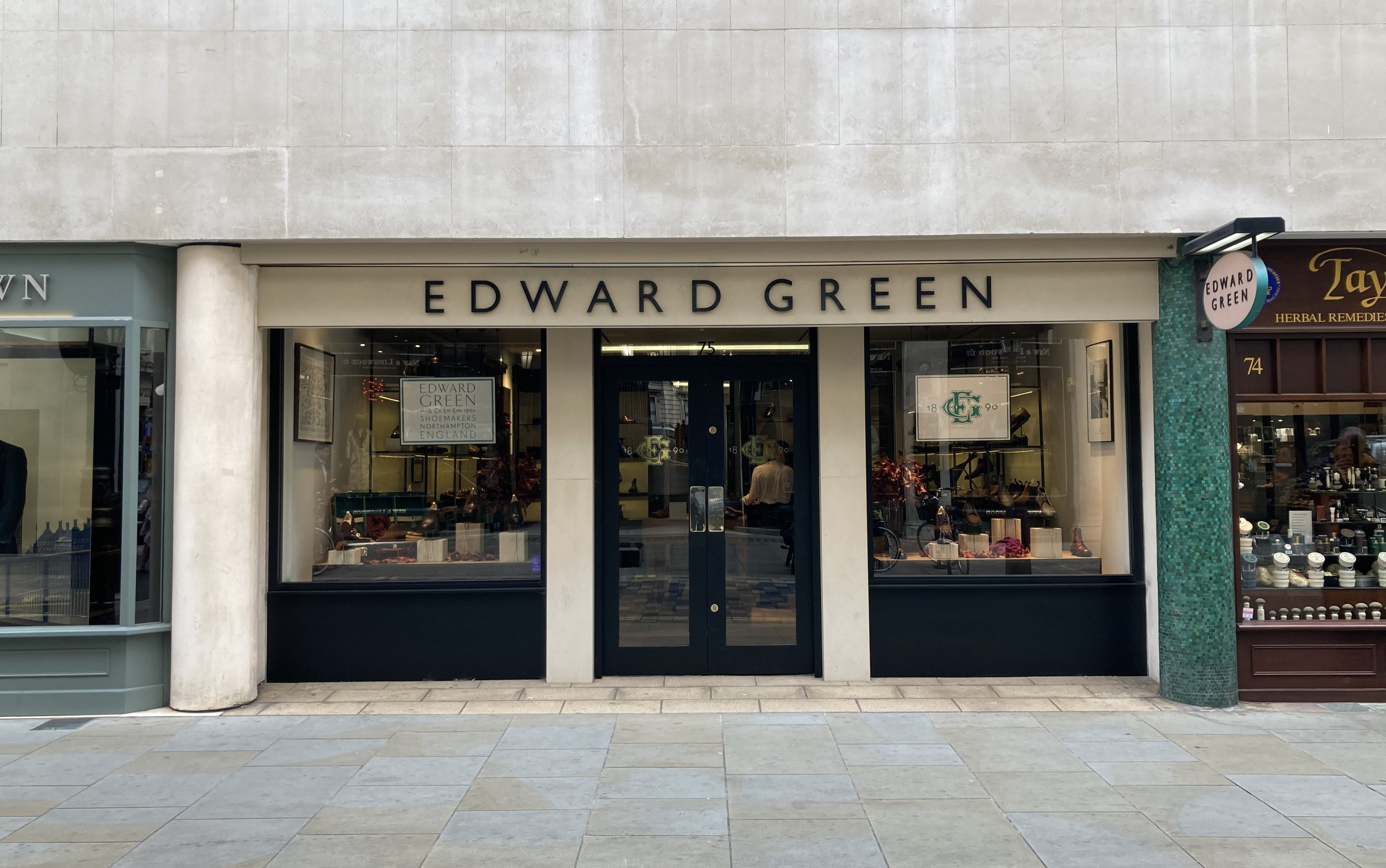
The Edward Green store on Jermyn Street in London

In 1890, Edward Green began to make hand-crafted shoes for men in a small factory in Northampton.

The company was sold in 1977 by Green's nephew, Michael Green to an American leather entrepreneur, Marley Hodgson, but financial problems continued and it was sold for a single British pound to another bespoke shoemaker, John Hlustik, an expert at finishing who is often credited with making brown shoes acceptable to British gentlemen. Upon Hlustik's death in 2000, the company was willed to his partner, Hilary Freeman.

== See also ==
- John Lobb
- Tricker's
- Church's
