= American Odyssey =

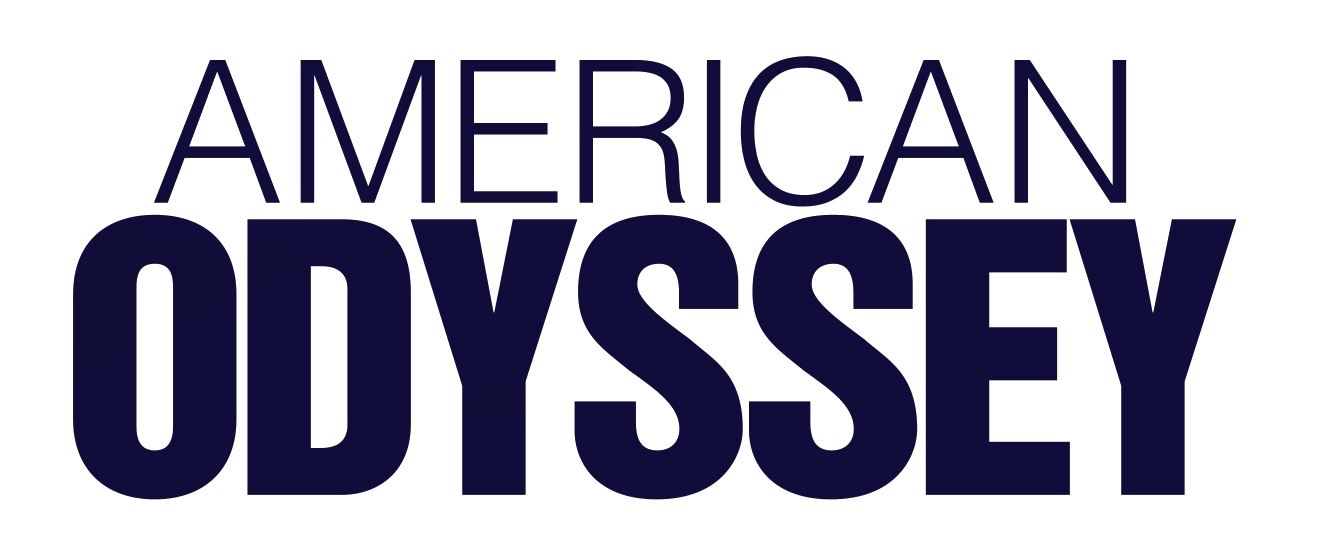
- Also known as: Odyssey
- Genre: Drama; Thriller; Action
- Created by: Peter Horton; Adam Armus; Kay Foster
- Starring: Anna Friel; Peter Facinelli; Jake Robinson; Jim True-Frost; Treat Williams; Sadie Sink; Omar Ghazaoui; Nate Mooney; Elena Kampouris; Daniella Pineda; Adewale Akinnuoye-Agbaje
- Composer: John Debney
- Country of origin: United States
- Original language: English
- No. of seasons: 1
- No. of episodes: 13

Production
- Executive producers: Adam Armus; Henrik Bastin; Mikkel Bondesen; Kristen Campo; Nora Kay Foster; Peter Horton; Simon Maxwell; David Waco
- Producers: Devin Rich; Peter McAleese
- Production locations: New York; Morocco
- Cinematography: Balazs Bolygo; Stuart Dryburgh; Yaron Orbach
- Editors: Scott Hill; Dan Zimmerman
- Running time: 45 minutes
- Production company: Universal Television

Original release
- Network: NBC
- Release: April 5 – June 28, 2015

American Odyssey (known in the UK under its original title Odyssey) is an American action thriller television series which aired on NBC from April 5 to June 28, 2015. Created by Peter Horton, Adam Armus and Kay Foster, the series revolves around the discovery by a U.S. Army team on a secret mission in Mali, that a major U.S. company has been funding Islamist terror groups, and the subsequent cover-up of this revelation, which involves the attack and killing of the team of U.S. soldiers by private military contractors dispatched by the same company.

The series stars Anna Friel, Peter Facinelli, Jake Robinson, Jim True-Frost, Treat Williams, Nate Mooney, Elena Kampouris, Daniella Pineda, Sadie Sink, Adewale Akinnuoye-Agbaje and Omar Ghazaoui. It is envisioned by the creators as a modern-day take on Homer's Odyssey.

On June 30, 2015, NBC cancelled the series after one season.

== Cast ==
=== Main cast ===
- Anna Friel as Sergeant Odelle Ballard, a member of the U.S. Army stationed in Mali working with Task Force 24 (a unit of the Joint Special Operations Command)
- Peter Facinelli as Peter Decker, Former U.S. Attorney now working for Simon-Wachtel in business intelligence
- Jake Robinson as Harrison Walters, a political activist who becomes involved after he meets a hacker who claims to have unearthed a massive coverup involving the military.
- Jim True-Frost as Ron Ballard, husband of Odelle Ballard
- Treat Williams as Colonel Stephen Glen, a high-ranking officer of the United States Africa Command
- Nate Mooney as Bob Offer, an activist and hacker
- Elena Kampouris as Maya Decker, daughter of Peter Decker
- Daniella Pineda as Ruby Simms which is an alias, born as Erica "Rikki" Castillo, a hitwoman/assassin for Societel, also known as SOC. Introduces herself as a "freelance reporter". She later falls in love with Harrison Walters.
- Sadie Sink as Suzanne Ballard, daughter of Odelle and Ron Ballard
- Adewale Akinnuoye-Agbaje as Frank Majors, OSELA mercenary
- Omar Ghazaoui as Aslam, young Malian who helps Sgt. Ballard in her journey back home.
- Jayne Houdyshell as Rose Offer

=== Recurring cast ===
- Sarah Wynter as Sarah Decker, wife of Peter and mother of Maya
- Jay O. Sanders as Alex Baker, CEO of Societel
- Grégory Fitoussi as Luc Girard, French expatriate drug dealer in Mali
- Sherman Augustus as Frank McDonald, Peter's boss at Simon-Wachtel
- Yousef Sweid as Shakir Khan, Aslam's uncle and famous television drag queen personality
- Connor Trinneer as Michael Banks, CEO of Osela Private Security, and Ruby Simms' superior
- Allison Mack as Julia, a military intelligence analyst who befriends Suzanne
- Alex Kingston as Jennifer Wachtel, head of Simon-Wachtel
- Orla Brady as Sophia Tsaldari, leading candidate for Greek Prime Minister
- Rajeev Pahuja as Yusif, Imam in Pakistan, living underground in the United States
- Tala Ashe as Anna Stone
- Bianca de la Garza as Tania, Anchor
- Sara Martins as Serena, Luc Girard's girlfriend
- Cameron Dallas as Cameron, Maya's temporary boyfriend
- Stephen Caffrey as David Tennant, an executive who is part of the conspiracy
- Reed Birney as Senator Thomas Darnell, a politician who is part of the conspiracy

== Production and release ==
NBC commissioned the series in May 2014 under the title Odyssey, but only three weeks before the premiere, the network decided to change the title to American Odyssey, stating that this "better reflects the journey undertaken by lead character Odelle". However, many commentators regarded as an attempt by NBC to piggyback on the box office success of American Sniper and ABC's success with American Crime. According to TV Insider, the main reason for the surprising last minute name change was that the awareness of the upcoming series was low, and that the retitling would offer "the opportunity to better market the show to middle-American audiences."

A teaser trailer was released on March 6, 2015, which revealed an April 5 release date and featured the tagline, "A soldier. A mother. Betrayed. Her odyssey begins."

The first two episodes were shown as a double bill when BBC Two premiered the series in the United Kingdom on Sunday June 28, 2015, under its original name.

The series was originally set to premiere in Australia on the Seven Network in 2015 but did not premiere until March 20, 2016, in a late night timeslot.

== Reception ==
The series has received mixed or average reviews from U.S. critics. On Rotten Tomatoes, it has a rating of 54% based on 28 reviews, with an average rating of 6.7/10. The site's critical consensus reads "With a been-there-seen-that premise and multiple muddled plots, American Odyssey can't escape the shadows of its superior predecessors in an age of solid spy/action television." On Metacritic, the show has a score of 59 out of 100, based on 17 critics, indicating "Mixed or average reviews".

The initial reaction from British reviewers was also fairly negative. Michael Hogan in The Daily Telegraph wrote after the first two episodes had aired that "The programme wasn't without tense moments but the trouble was its scattergun plotting. It was like someone had cut up broadsheet newspapers from recent years and glued bits randomly to the script, making the whole thing lack cohesion. Homeland it certainly isn't." Ellen E. Jones of The Independent was less harsh, writing that "This new series starring Anna Friel as an American special-ops soldier really is global conflict for dummies, but that doesn't necessarily make for bad television. It's nonsense, but it's glossy, well-executed nonsense." David Butcher in Radio Times commented that "Parts of Odyssey may remind you dimly of Homeland. Its American network NBC probably hoped to create a down-and-dirty version of the Claire Danes thriller, but what we end up with is more Poundland than Homeland. It's perfectly serviceable, undemanding drama, with a bit of (not nearly enough) action here and there. But Homeland it ain’t."

== Episodes ==
No.	Title	Directed by	Written by	Original release date	US viewers (millions)
1	"Gone Elvis"	Peter Horton	Story by : Kay Foster & Peter Horton; Teleplay by : Adam Armus	April 5, 2015	5.37
During a mission with her special ops Task Force 24 team in Mali, North Africa, Sgt. Odelle Ballard stumbles upon encrypted files that prove a major American corporation called Societel (also known as SOC) is secretly funding terrorists. She copies it onto a flash drive before the untrustworthy private military group, OSELA show up. After an attack on her unit, she becomes the sole survivor and must make the grueling journey back home. Meanwhile, former U.S. Attorney-turned-B.I. Pete Decker uncovers corruption in the private sector at his new job. Also, G8 protest-organizer Harrison Walters suspects a government cover-up when Bob Offer hacks into Odelle's webmail account, finding her distress signal.
2	"Oscar Mike"	Peter Horton	Story by : Kay Foster & Peter Horton; Teleplay by : Adam Armus	April 12, 2015	4.05
Sgt. Ballard tries to avoid detection while traveling through the desert with Aslam, her young Malian companion and a caravan of hostile male Tuaregs who are forced to hand her over to Ansar Dine. Meanwhile, Peter takes his suspicions about Societel to the Department of Justice and is later framed for the murder of Lieutenant Gentry. His daughter sneaks off to see Sophia Tsaldari, the frontrunner for Prime Minister of Greece, who’s in the city to unveil her political plan. Also, after Harrison searches the city and finally finds Bob, he is ready to address the protestors with the evidence. However, Bob is reluctant to reveal Ballard's email proving that she is still alive and deletes it.
3	"Drop King"	Rod Lurie	Dahvi Waller	April 19, 2015	3.11
On the way to Bamako, Odelle loses Aslam as he retrieves the flash-drive, being shot down as he does so. While a captive of Al-Qaeda, Ballard tries to prove her value to an Ansar Dine interrogator, who is willing to help her escape for the right information. She says that the boy (Aslam) has the flash-drive with proof on it. Meanwhile, Ruby Simms tells Harrison that the email was a fake. Harrison finds out from Bob that the email was indeed real, and that Harrison's journalist father, Randall Walters, knows Colonel Glen as a source. Harrison seeks his father's help to meet Glen and ask him about Odelle. He mentions the email, and Glen says it must be fake. Surviving, Aslam is picked up by Luc Girard, who learns of the flash-drive, and of Aslam's rich uncle in Bamako. Again on their way to Bamako, Ansar Dine stops them, and Aslam slips away with the drive. After the meeting with Glen, Randall tells Harrison that Glen was lying. Randall says he will ask another source that he has. Also, Peter puts himself and his family in danger when he uncovers evidence against Societel Mining through Lt. Gentry's journal. While Peter is driving with Maya, someone holds them up and takes the journal. Aslam finds his way to Shakir Khan in Bamako. Sophia Tsaldari gives Peter a copy of receipt for $ 30,500,000 paid to Societel.
4	"Tango Uniform"	Rod Lurie	Adam Armus & Kay Foster	April 26, 2015	2.78
While still captive at the Ansar Dine Safe House in Bamako, a daring move leaves Odelle face to face with her biggest threat—Frank Majors, the OSELA mercenary who is looking to eliminate her. Meanwhile, Peter hits a major setback in his Societel investigation with Senator Darnell, someone he tried to prosecute in the past. Bob Offer has been hacking, and fearfully reveals to Harrison that his father was not shot by his mistress, but was murdered because he was asking dangerous questions. Ron and Suzanne Ballard visit Colonel Glen, and Suzanne makes it clear that she doesn't trust the Colonel. Harrison struggles with his father's death, but faithfully delivers his eulogy at the wake. In doing so, he mentions he will dedicate his life to finding the truth as to what really happened, much to the dislike of Colonel Glen. Also, Aslam's uncle, who is the famous drag queen Shakir on television, asks a Malian general, Diallo, for help in finding Odelle.
5	"Beat Feet"	Rod Lurie	Arika Lisanne Mittman	May 3, 2015	3.11
During her travels with the Malian Army, Odelle calls Col. Glen who tells her the U.S. Embassy isn't safe, but instead, orders her to go to a secret CIA safe house where she'll wait for an extraction team to take her back home. However, she wonders if she can trust him after seeing her own funeral on national television. Meanwhile, Peter learns Societel is setting up his colleague, Joe Abrams, who becomes a scapegoat for all the company's payoffs in the Mid-East and is later arrested. Looking for clues on his father’s murder, Harrison works with Bob who finds Randall's last source—businessman David Tennant who may be linked with a group called Black Sands.
6	"Wingman"	Jon Jones	Bill Kennedy	May 10, 2015	2.69
After seeing Aslam's picture on Shakir Kahn's TV show, Odelle is reunited with her young companion, who had been recaptured by Luc, a French "facilitator" (drug dealer), who had taken the zip drive from Aslam. Odelle contacts The New York Times to set up a meeting with a reporter. Meanwhile, Peter's teenage daughter, Maya, gets more involved in her relationship with 21-year-old Cameron, believed and later confirmed to be a Societel spy. Peter confronts Cameron while meeting with Sophia Tsaldari, who disputes the rumor of her husband being a terrorist who made deals with Black Sands. Before Peter's meeting with Sophia, he met with Alex Baker, head of Societel, who had shown Peter a photo that apparently depicts Sophia and her late husband having met with Qasim, a suspected terrorist known as the Jack of Spades, whom the U.S. was said to have killed. Later, Harrison runs into Ruby at The New York Times as he inquires about a story his father never finished, and he talks to Emerson, who's writing Randall's obituary. Later, Bob, wary of Ruby, avoids talking to Harrison until he can do so alone. The two spot Qasim attending a local mosque, and they follow him. Majors, having traced Odelle's previous attempted call to her family from Luc's phone, unknowingly kills Luc's girlfriend Serena during a mission when she instead answers her boyfriend's phone.
7	"Soup Sandwich"	Jon Jones	Story by : Adam Armus & Kay Foster; Teleplay by : Peter Horton	May 17, 2015	2.63
Taking Shakir Kahn's advice, Odelle makes a video recording for a French New York Times journalist working out of Paris after learning that Majors is still pursuing her. With limited options, Odelle and Aslam attempt to enlist Luc's help to no avail. Shakir attempts to deliver the recorded video tape to the reporter, but is intercepted and badly beaten up whilst interrogated by Majors. Meanwhile, Peter leads two hired hackers into the Societel mainframe to recover the evidence on Sophia Tsaldari. However, Peter's infiltration is complicated by the self-defense killing of Gentry's murderer. Also, Harrison's investigation into Qasim inadvertently gets him arrested by the N.Y.P.D. Later, in the Ballard household, Ron and Suzanne learn that one of Odelle's belongings (her wedding ring) has been falsified by the U.S. military, and Ron starts to believe his wife could be alive.
8	"Kmag Yoyo"	Jon Jones	Jace Richdale	May 24, 2015	2.47
After an extensive background check, Bob learns of Ruby Simms's original identity as a teenager nicknamed "Rikki" and attempts to warn Harrison, but his GPS search for him leads to Ruby's residence. Meanwhile, Harrison continues his search for Qasim despite a warning from Senator Darnell. Peter has Sarah relocate their family to her mother's house after studying a file detailing Societel's surveillance activities on them, forcing him to adopt a different strategy in confronting his employer. Suzanne befriends a woman named Julia at a bookstore, not aware that she's actually involved with military intelligence. Odelle and Aslam become stranded in the desert after their car breaks down, where the pair gets located by a group of bandits at dusk. Majors and his team are apprehended by the Malian military in response to Shakir Kahn's death. When General Diallo attempts to execute Majors, his men betray him due to their disgust of his romantic relationship with Kahn, giving Majors the opportunity to kill him. Later, Majors takes refuge in Luc's compound, only to be knocked out after engaging in hand-to-hand combat.
9	"Figmo"	Jamie Payne	Andrea Ciannavei	May 31, 2015	2.97
After Odelle and Aslam encounter bandits in the desert, Luc rescues them by bribing the bandits with drugs. On the way to Timbuktu, Odelle learns about the Frenchman's past in the Foreign Legion and discovers her enemy Majors is unconscious just a few feet away in the back of the truck. Meanwhile, in New York, Sophia agrees to help Peter get closer to Yusuf Qasim, but things go awry when he tries to meet him and a sniper takes out an adversary. Later, Bob tells Harrison the truth about Ruby’s false identity. However, when she tells him the truth, things she finds herself torn between her feelings for him and her job. Also, Suzanne and Julia continue to bond at the bookstore, which raises questions for both Ron and Colonel Glen, especially when the latter visits the family to tell them Odelle's wedding ring was remade by the Army to replace the real one. Bob's mother, Rose, dies of unknown causes.
10	"Fubar Bundy"	Jamie Payne	Julia Ruchman	June 7, 2015	2.53
A distraught Bob confides to Harrison his suspicions of Ruby playing a role in his mother's death, with Harrison barely able to calm him down. Harrison attempts to continue contacting Yusuf's imam, only to get assaulted by Osela operatives at the order of Ruby's handler. Ruby confronts her handler about the attack on Harrison, only to be blackmailed that he will tell Harrison about her role in his father's death. Meanwhile, Peter successfully makes contact with Yusuf, learning of Darnell's role in tarnishing his reputation. When attempting to withdraw Yusuf from the United States, Yusuf makes a last-minute decision to assassinate Darnell, out of fear of "not being remembered," further complicating matters for Peter and Sophia. In Timbuktu, Odelle and Aslam struggle with the moral implications of executing Majors, with the former ultimately carrying out the act. Fearing that Odelle destroyed his only bargaining chip against Osela, Luc turns Odelle over to the local warlord.
11	"Gingerbread"	Jamie Payne	Story by : Peter Horton; Teleplay by : Adam Armus & Kay Foster	June 14, 2015	2.35
Luc's apparent betrayal in Timbuktu is revealed to be an elaborate ruse in order to falsify Odelle's death, fooling a pursuing Osela mercenary into coming home with Odelle's dog tags as "evidence" for delivery to Colonel Glenn. Meanwhile, Harrison and Peter temporarily cross paths with each other, with both men facing personal complications. Harrison learns of Ruby's connections to Osela from Bob after investigating her belongings, while a remorseful Ruby chooses suicide by cop to avoid imprisonment. Meanwhile, an unemployed Peter learns that the previously employed hacker implicates Peter in the murder of Gentry's assassin, as well as Sarah's desire to divorce him.
12	"Bug Out"	Clark Johnson	Adam Armus	June 21, 2015	2.20
While trying to stay incognito on the Algerian coast for their trip to Spain, Odelle and Luc face difficulties in deciding what is best for Aslam's future. However, Odelle pulls from the water a drowned female victim named Naima, and rescues her by administering a cycle of five chest compressions and breathing air into her lungs, this inadvertently places her on the spotlight after being witnessed by vacationing students. Harrison and Peter run into separate dead-ends on their investigations into Societel and consider quitting, only to be reinvigorated after learning of Odelle's survival in the news.
13	"Real World"	Clark Johnson	Story by : Adam Armus & Kay Foster; Teleplay by : Adam Armus & Peter Horton	June 28, 2015	2.20
Odelle and Aslam make it to Barcelona, Spain, and are surprised that the person taking care of them is Luc's ex-wife. Odelle attempts to meet with journalist Isabel Rainey, but is intercepted by Colonel Glen, and blackmailed that she is going to be branded as a traitor and deserter if she comes forward with her story and evidence. Odelle continues with her story anyway, forcing her to make emergency arrangements for both her family and Aslam before disappearing. A resentful Ron punches Glen in the face for the lies he was fed after temporarily reuniting with Odelle. Meanwhile, Harrison and Bob manage to find a data trove detailing Ruby's previous operations and leak it to the FBI, leading to the arrest of Michael Banks by local police. Peter gives his evidence to The New York Times to corroborate Harrison and Odelle's respective stories, which in turn publicly humiliates Societel, forcing Alex Baker to commit suicide, and allowing the International Monetary Fund to forgive Greece's debt to Societel. With the aid of Rainey, Odelle returns to Washington D.C. disguised as the journalist.
