= Allen Edmonds =

American shoe company

Allen Edmonds Shoe Corporation

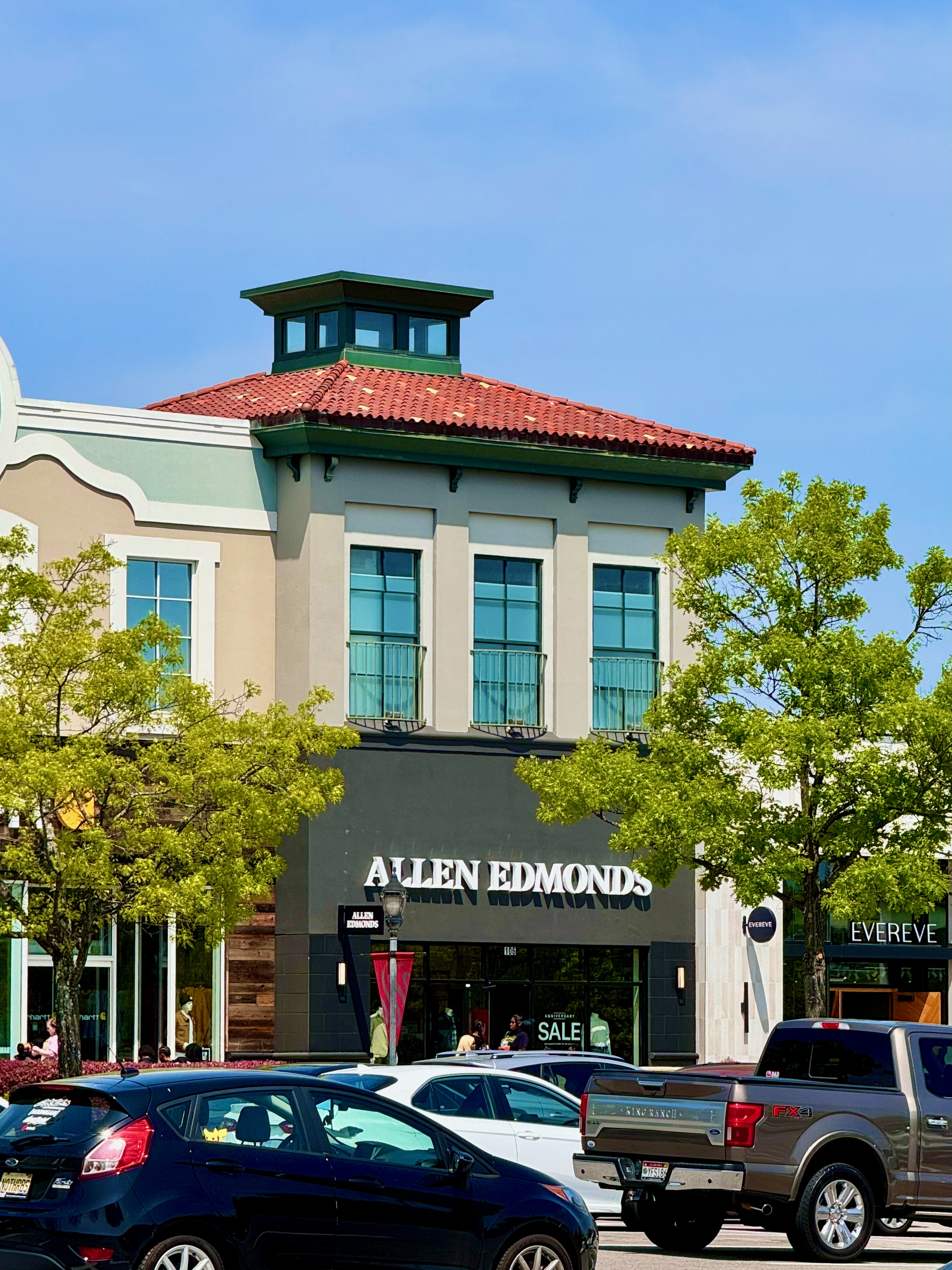
- Allen Edmonds at The Summit (Alabama)
- Formerly: Allen-Spiegel Shoe Company (1922-1931)
- Type: Subsidiary
- Industry: Fashion
- Founded: 1922; 104 years ago in Belgium, Wisconsin, U.S.
- Headquarters: 201 E Seven Hills Rd, Port Washington, Wisconsin, U.S. 53074; 43.4105°N 87.8689°W
- Number of locations: 60+ stores (2022)
- Products: Men's dress shoes; casual shoes; boots; sneakers; apparel; accessories
- Parent: Caleres (2016 - present)
- Website: allenedmonds.com

Allen Edmonds is an American upscale men's shoe company based in Port Washington, Wisconsin. The company was established in Belgium, Wisconsin, in 1922 by Elbert W. Allen as Allen-Spiegal Shoe Company. The company is one of the few companies to maintain manufacturing in the U.S. and was the choice for four U.S. presidents on their inauguration day: Ronald Reagan, George H. W. Bush, Bill Clinton and George W. Bush.

== History ==
In 1922, Elbert Allen began crafting men's shoes by hand in Belgium, Wisconsin, but did not know how to effectively sell his shoes. In 1931, Allen partnered with Bill Edmonds, a salesman, and formed the Allen Edmonds Corporation. Allen ran the company until he died in 1946 and the company was passed onto Allen's son, Elbert "Bert" Allen, Jr. Upon Bert's death in 1968, the company was handed down to Bert's younger brothers. In 1980, the company was sold out of the Allen family to John Stollenwerk, who was committed to continuing the Allen family's history of American production.

Allen Edmonds gained much of its following after providing shoes to the US Army and US Navy during World War II, with many of the recipients of the shoes being loyal to the brand for the rest of their lives.

Around 2000-2005, as online shopping increased, the brand faced competition for its $600 range, American-made shoes from European brands and upstart U.S. brands like To Boot New York introducing new products such as Italian-made shoes in the $300–350 range which were generally lighter and sleeker, and seemed more modern, even if they were not as high quality. Average shoppers couldn't distinguish the quality of "Park Avenue" products like Allen Edmonds and often chose the cheaper, trendier upstart product.

In 2006, 90% of the shares in the company were bought by Minneapolis-based investment firm Goldner Hawn Johnson & Morrison for $100 million. In 2013, the company announced that it would be acquired by private equity firm Brentwood Associates. In December 2016, Caleres acquired Allen Edmonds from Brentwood Associates for $255 million.

== Manufacturing ==
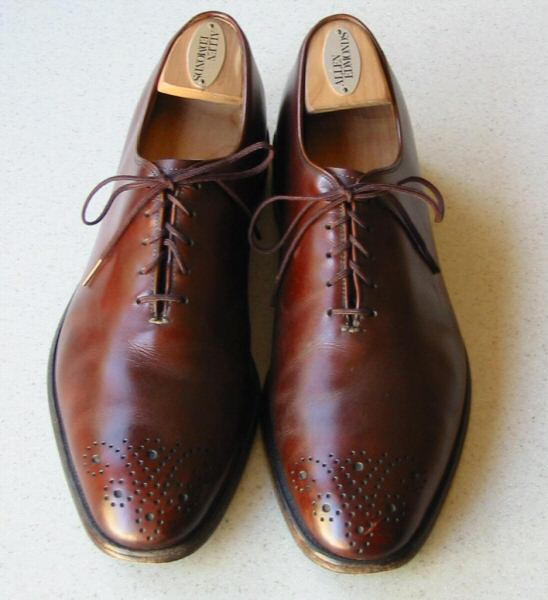
Pair of wholecut oxfords

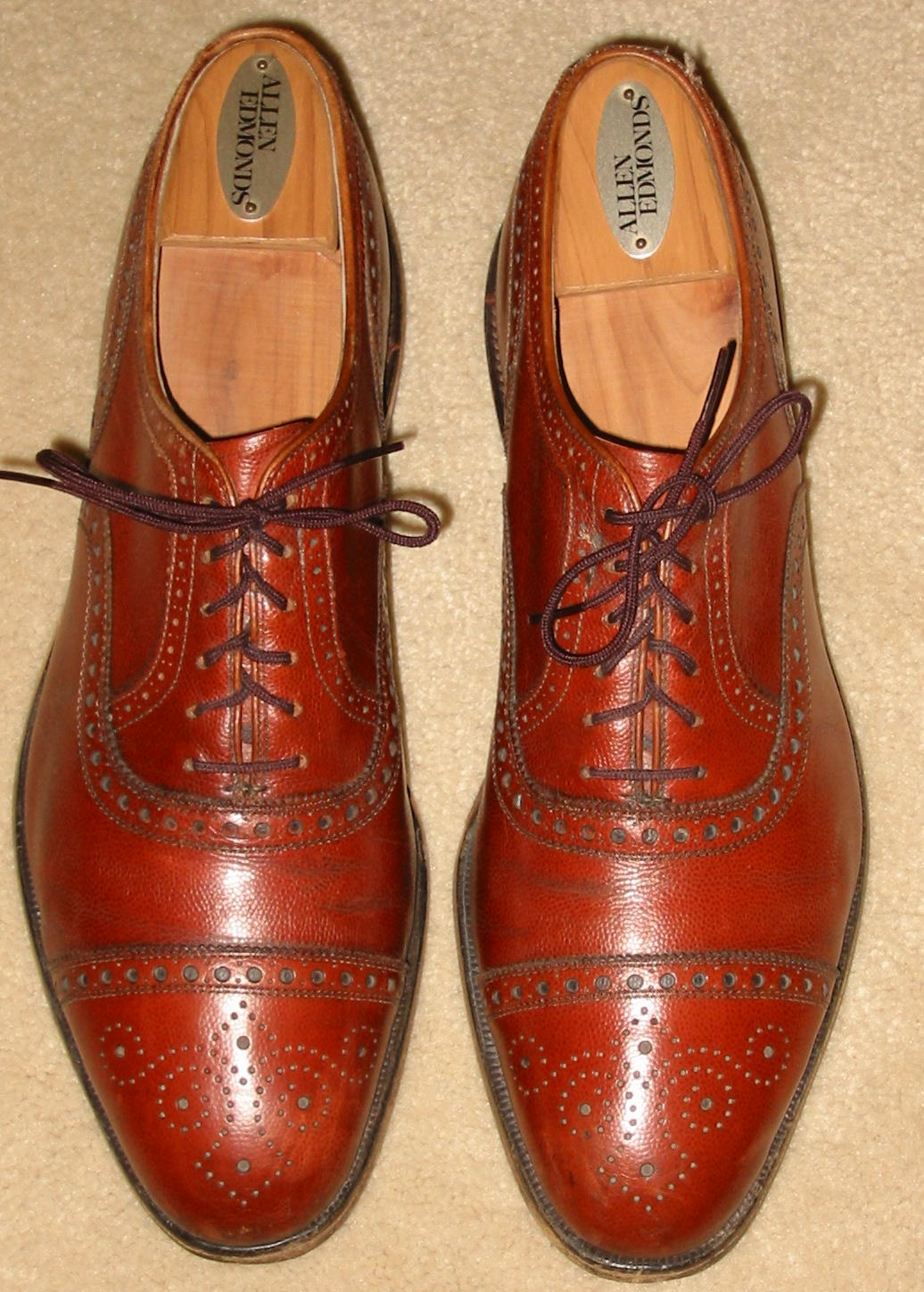
Pair of semi brogues

With more than ninety-eight per cent of shoes sold in the U.S. being produced overseas, Allen Edmonds is among a small minority of companies producing shoes domestically. John Stollenwerk, Allen Edmonds's retired chairman and former owner was committed to keeping manufacturing in the U.S. In 2003, the company invested $1 million (1.1% of sales) to refit their factory to save 5% on production of each shoe. Its assembly lines were replaced with teams of craftsmen, allowing reduced overtime, more ease in covering for absent employees, and fewer manufacturing imperfections.

In 2006, concerned with rising manufacturing costs and ambitions to compete in the boat shoe and hand-sewn market, Allen Edmonds closed its Lewiston, Maine, manufacturing plant and moved its hand-sewn production to a new, company-owned factory in the Dominican Republic. Shoe uppers for the Allen Edmonds hand-sewn collection are cut and sewn in the Dominican Republic; raw materials are sent from the U.S. for sewing, then shipped to Port Washington, Wisconsin for completion. Horween Leather Company supplies cordovan shells for Allen Edmonds.

Allen Edmonds offers recrafting services to refurbish its shoes, which includes replacing soles and heels; creating a new cork base and strip; and reapplying finish. The company recrafts 26,000 pairs of shoes each year and has recrafted one million pairs since the program's inception. The company states a pair of its shoes can be recrafted about four times before it should be retired.

As of 2022, Allen Edmonds employs 135 craftspeople, many of which are 2nd and 3rd-generation makers, and has an apprentice program to train new generations of craftspeople. Each shoe goes through a 212-step process and will see up to 60 different craftspeople before the shoe is completed.

== See also ==
- Alden Shoe Company
- Caleres
- Church's
- Horween Leather
- Johnston & Murphy
- Peal and Company Limited
