= SATRA =

Research centre in Kettering, UK

Coordinates: 52.41001°N 0.74825°W

SATRA Technology Centre (SATRA) is a research and technology centre, employing over 180 scientific, technical and support staff across three sites one in each the UK, Ireland and China. Founded as the British Boot, Shoe and Allied Trades Research Association in 1919, it has since extended its expertise to cover other consumer product industry sectors including furniture, safety products, clothing, floorcoverings, leathergoods, homeware, and cleaning technology. It is partly funded through membership, which includes 1,600 companies in over 70 countries.

SATRA is also a Notified Body for EU Directives on personal protective equipment, toys and construction products.

SATRA's activities include research, material and product evaluation, consumer product and personal protective equipment testing, management systems and consultancy, international quality systems, quality assurance, publications, information services, and the production and sale of test equipment.

Its facilities include testing capability for fall arrest harnesses, fireproof suits, safety eyewear, chain saw protection, and horse riding protective equipment. It also undertakes footwear durability testing, footwear fitting, chemistry laboratory testing, and furniture durability testing.

== Awards ==
- SATRA won the Queen's Award to Industry (Now Queen's award for Enterprise) in 1969 for its Heat Setting Process
- SATRA won Interiors Monthly award for Best Product Testing Provider 2024 for its Furniture and Flooring testing

== Everest boots ==
SATRA played a role in the successful expedition to the top of Mount Everest in 1953 in which Sir Edmund Hillary, along with Tenzing Norgay, became the first person to 'stand on top of the world'. In 1952, SATRA was approached by The British Expedition to produce 34 pairs of boots to meet the challenge of climbing in one of the most inhospitable environments on the planet. The boots were designed to provide a high level of thermal insulation for use in high altitude and saw a combination of inner vapour barrier, mesh insoles and an integrated rubber outer gaiter: the water resistant vapour barrier's inner layer stopped the boots becoming soaked with sweat then freezing; the mesh insole allowed sweat to disperse from the socks; the outer gaiter prevented melting snow soaking in to the boot itself. There were five layers of Ceiba pentandra•kapok insulation, a naturally hollow fibre and a forerunner of synthetic versions. The boot lasting technique helped prevent compression of the vital insulation material and microcellular resin soles further improved insulation and decreased weight.

The result was boots that weighed only 4 lb 4oz (1.9kg) almost 1kg lighter than comparable footwear at the time, and a successful expedition in which no-one who wore the boots got frostbite – a remarkable achievement.
