= Loake =

British shoemaker

Loake Shoemakers
- Type: Privately held company
- Industry: Retail
- Founded: 1880
- Founder: John, Thomas and William Loake
- Headquarters: Kettering, Northamptonshire, England
- Products: Shoes
- Website: www.loake.co.uk

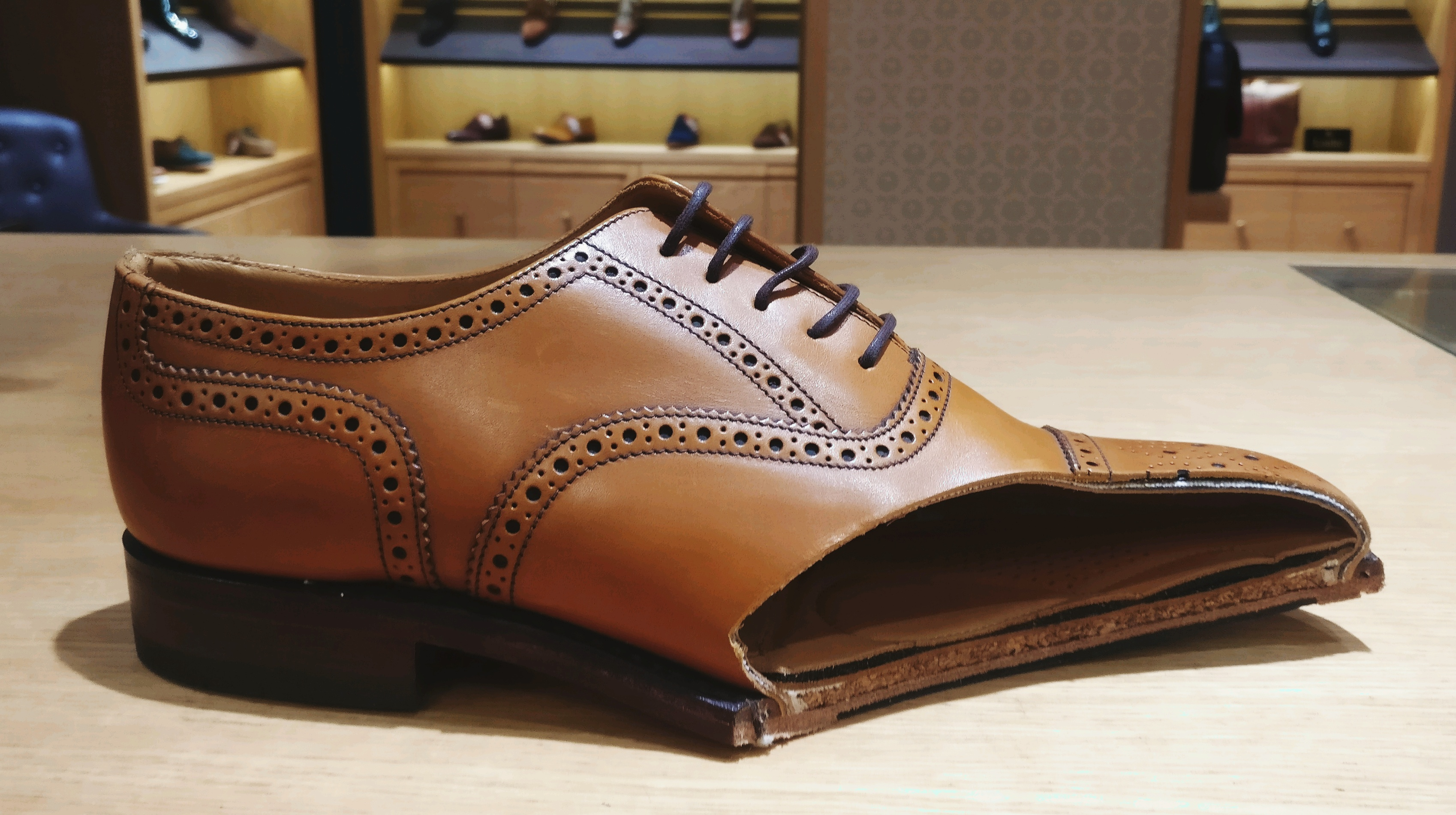
Cross section of a Loake brogue

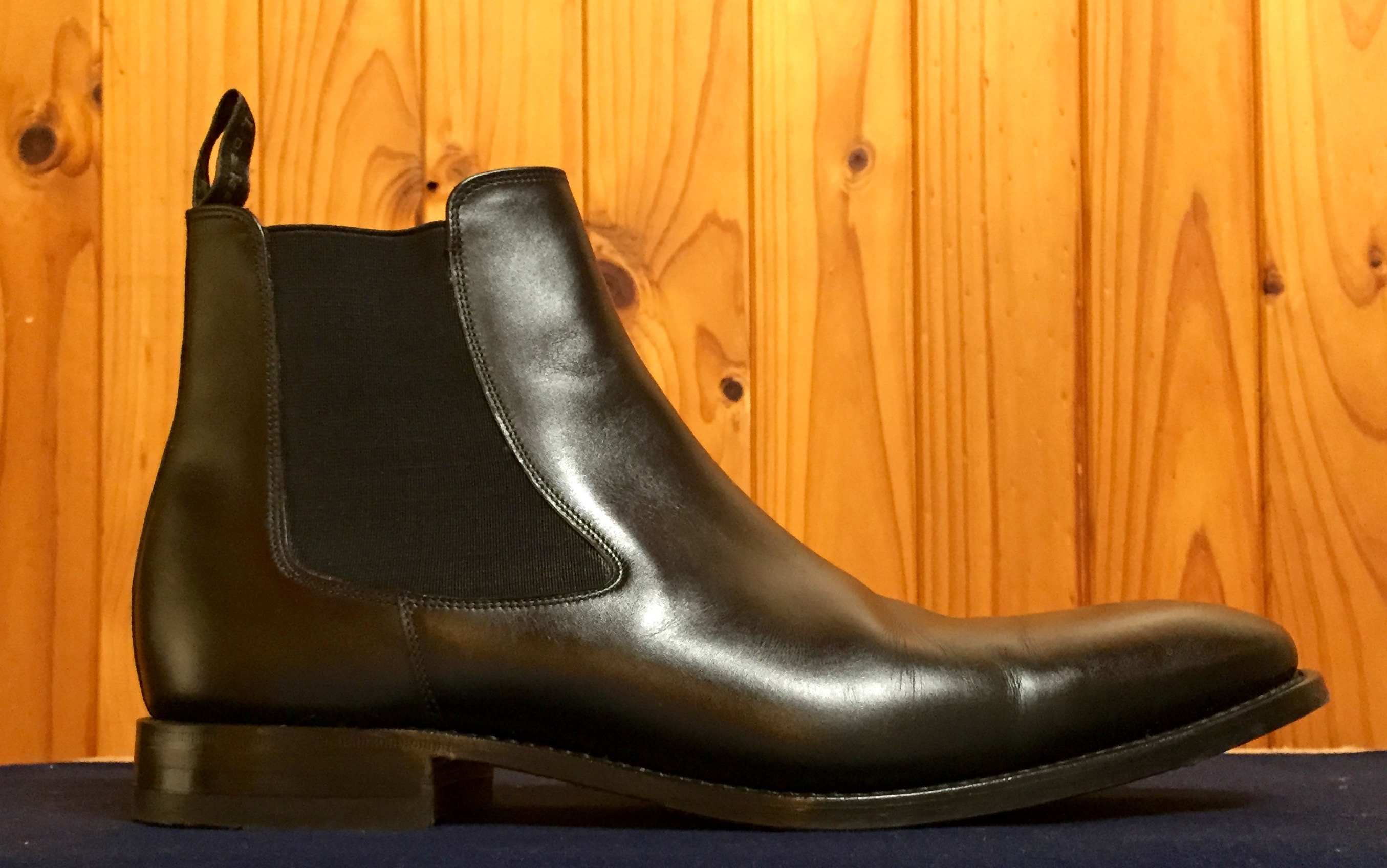
Loake Chelsea boot

Loake Brothers Ltd is a British shoemaker founded in 1880. It is family-owned and headquartered in Kettering, Northamptonshire, England. It specialises in men's handmade Goodyear-welted shoes.

== History ==
=== Founding and early history ===
Loake was founded by the brothers John, Thomas and William Loake in 1880 in an outbuilding at Thomas's house at 62 King Street, Kettering. Northamptonshire is the centre of the English shoemaking industry. In 1894 the brothers built a new factory and moved to Wood Street, where it can still be found today. The factory was initially named the Unique Boot Factory. It has a floor area of approximately 20,000 sq ft and accommodates over 300 workers. It was considered one of the finest and most advanced shoe factories in the country, at the time. The factory is split into three parts: bottom stock (soles), the making room, where the shoes are finished, and a warehouse.

=== World Wars ===
During the First World War Loake contributed to the war effort with the manufacture of Terrain boots, Convalescent boots and Despatch Riders boots for the British Army. Cossack boots were also made for the Russian army.

Loake participated in the British Empire Exhibition, which was held at Wembley Park from 23 April 1924 to 31 October 1925. It was hoped that the Exhibition would strengthen the bonds within the British Empire, stimulate trade and demonstrate British greatness both abroad and at home.

During the Second World War factories in Great Britain were required to allocate production space to the war effort. Loake produced footwear for both the Royal Navy and the Royal Air Force. At its peak, production was 2,500 pairs of boots per week.

=== Post-War ===
In 1997, due to the decline of British manufacturing, market conditions and in-line with other British shoemakers, Loake made the decision to move about two-thirds of its closing operation—the stitching of its uppers—to India. Loake is involved in a joint venture with a privately owned Indian company whose factory is located near Chennai.

Loake have held a Royal Warrant since 2007, for providing men's footwear to Queen Elizabeth II.

In 2011 Loake opened their first standalone retail store on Jermyn Street, London.

In 2015 The Independent wrote of "the brand’s durable, comfortable but stylish footwear".
