= Alden Shoe Company =

American footwear company founded in 1884

- Type: Private
- Industry: Apparel
- Founded: 1884
- Founder: Charles H. Alden
- Headquarters: Middleborough, Massachusetts
- Website: www.aldenshoe.com

The Alden Shoe Company is an American shoe company founded in 1884 by Charles H. Alden in Middleborough, Massachusetts. Alden specializes in handcrafted men's leather boots and dress shoes, such as Oxfords, bluchers, loafers, and chukka boots.

== History ==
In the 19th century, there were once hundreds of shoemakers in New England, but now Alden is one of only a few factories. Alden is considered a heritage, family-owned brand. Many of the company's roughly 100 workers at its factory in Middleborough are second or third generation, and it sources its leathers mostly from small tanneries in Europe and the U.S. – its shell cordovan comes from the last such tannery in America, Horween Leather Company. Alden has used Horween as their leather supplier since 1930, and is their largest cordovan customer.

In 2021, former CFO Richard Hajjar pled guilty to embezzlement of over $30 million from the company of which some $17 million he had transferred to business run by his partner Bianca de la Garza. He was ordered to serve nearly six years in prison.

== Commercial resilience ==
Along with other brands of Americana, Alden has experienced something of a resurgence in 21st century men's fashion. Despite the Great Recession in the late 2000s, the decline of American shoe manufacturing, and the relatively high prices of their products, renewed interest in more traditional and durable men's footwear has benefited Alden.

== In popular culture ==
Alden model 405 is commonly referred to as the "Indy boot" because they were worn by Harrison Ford as Indiana Jones.

== See also ==
- Allen Edmonds
- Cole Haan
- Johnston & Murphy
