= Crepe rubber =

Form of coagulated latex

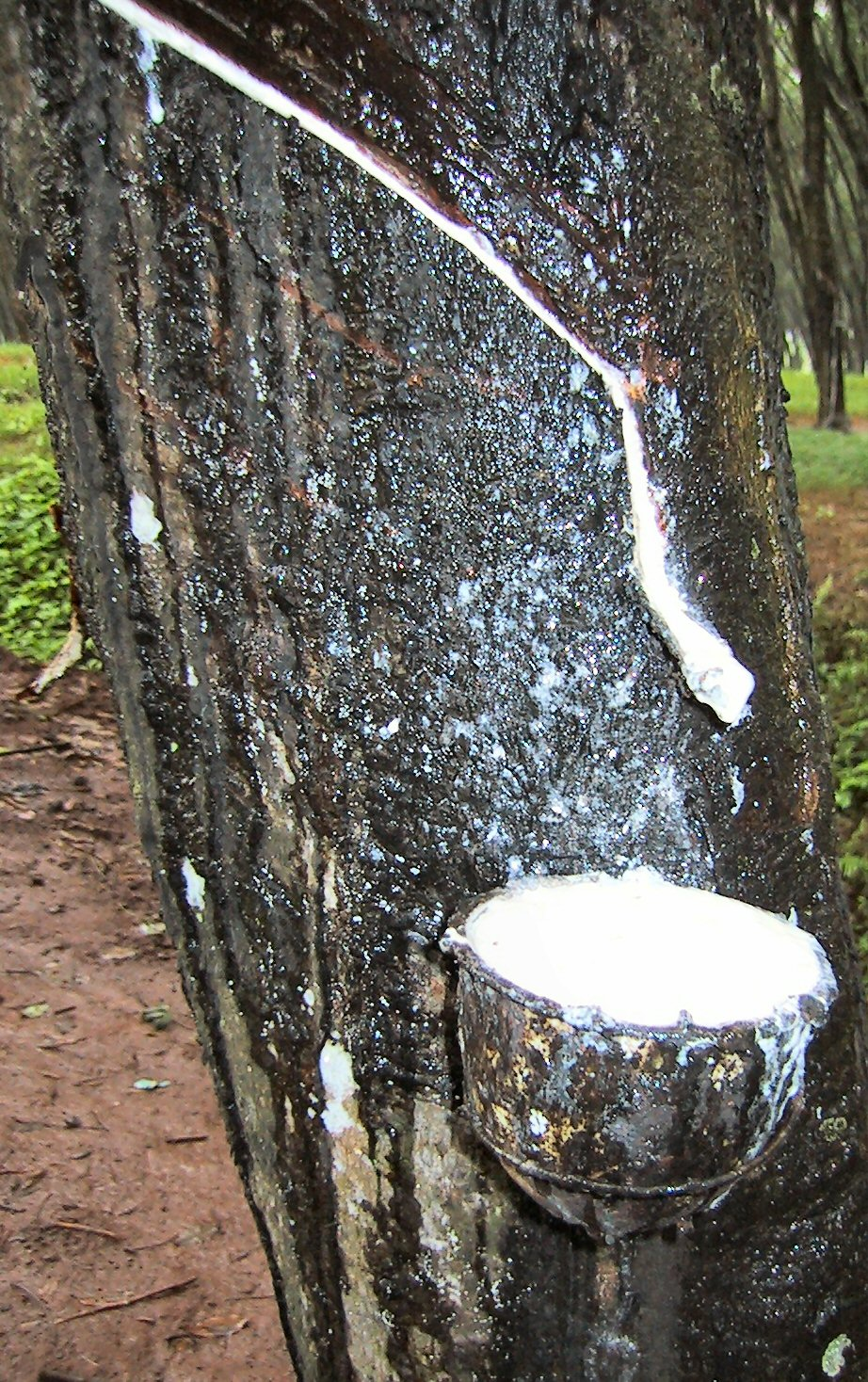
Latex collection from a rubber tree

Crepe rubber is coagulated latex that is rolled out in crinkled sheets and commonly used to make soles for shoes and boots but also a raw material for further processed rubber products.

== Processing ==
After the collection of the latex milk, sodium sulphite (Na_{2}SO_{3}) or ammonia is added to prevent coagulation.

When the latex arrives in the factory, sodium bisulphite (NaHSO_{3}) or sodium metabisulphite (Na_{2}S_{2}O_{5}) are added to prevent enzymatic reactions and discoloring.

Sodium para toluene thiophenate (an aromatic mercaptan) is often added as a bleaching agent.

Colloidal latex is then mixed with formic acid to cause it to coagulate. The coagulum is processed in a "creping battery", a series of machines that crush, press, and roll the coagula. The sheets are then hung in a heated drying shed and, after drying, sorted by grade and packed for shipping.

== Types ==
There are several types and grades of rubber crepe, mainly distinguished by the grade and pre-processing of the latex used in their manufacture.

- Pale latex crepe (PLC) is a premium grade, made from raw field latex.
- Estate brown crepe (EBC) is made from "cup lump" (raw, naturally coagulated rubber from the collection cup) and other coagula.
- Re-milled crepe is made from "wet slab coagulum" (cured latex, still wet from the coagulation tanks), latex sheets (unsmoked) and cup lump.
- Smoked blanket crepe is made from thick sheets of latex that have been processed in a smoker.
- Flat bark crepe is made from scraps and other poor quality raw product.

== Gallery ==
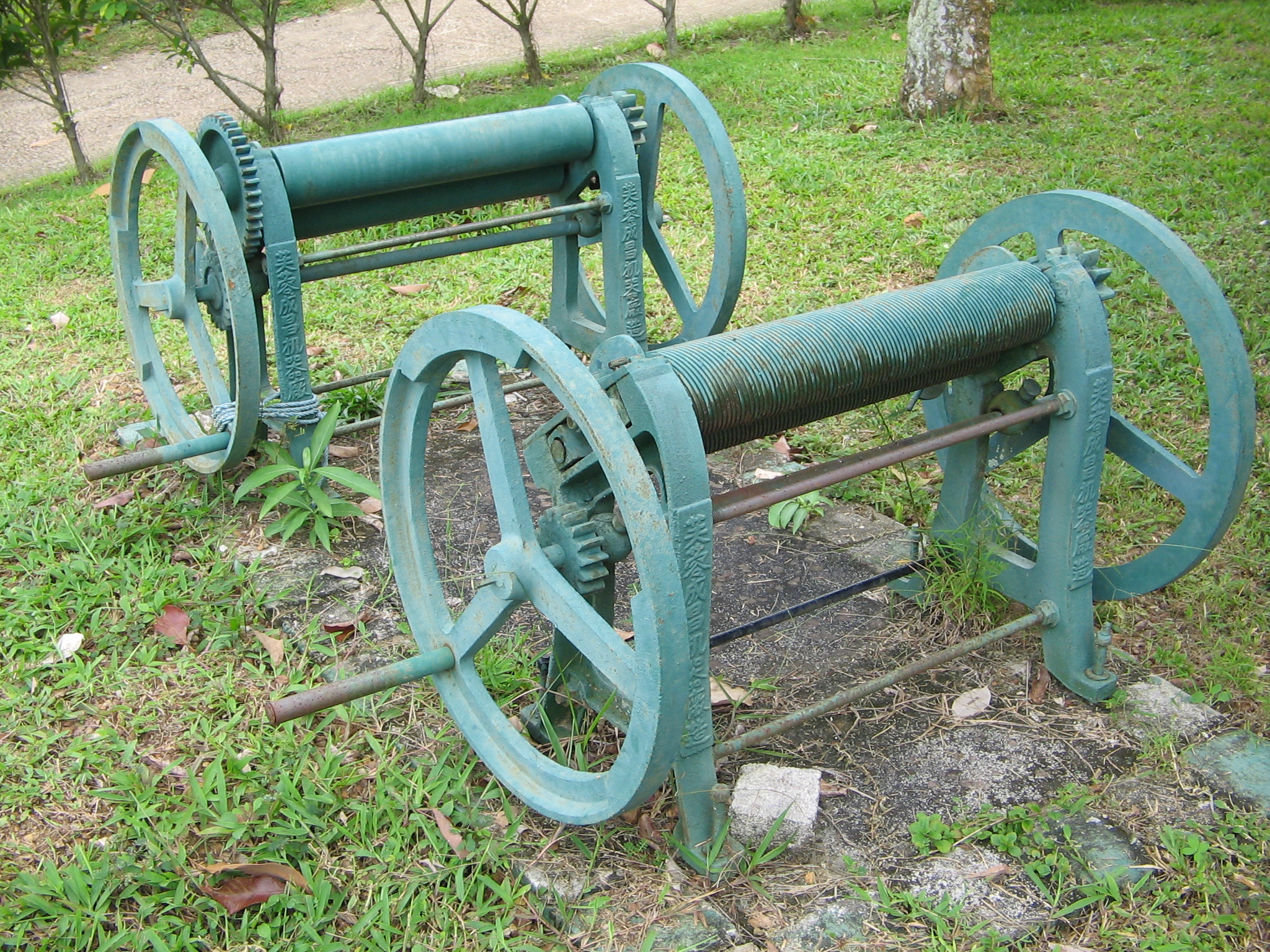
Hand-powered latex creping machines

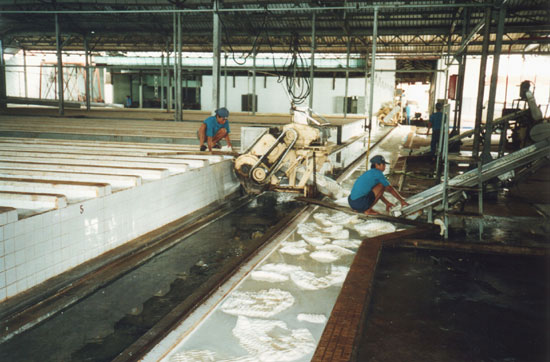
Removing coagulum from coagulating troughs

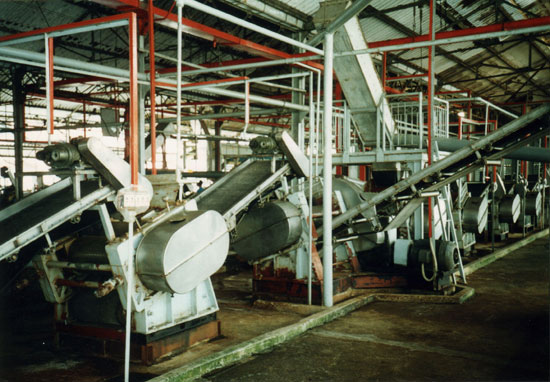
Creping battery

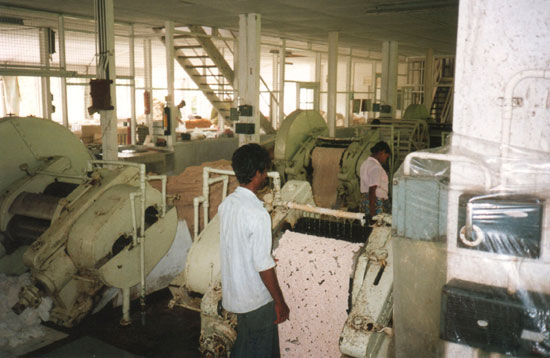
Milling honey-colored crepe

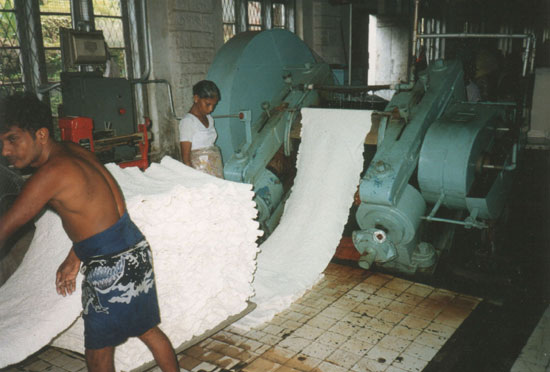
Milling white crepe

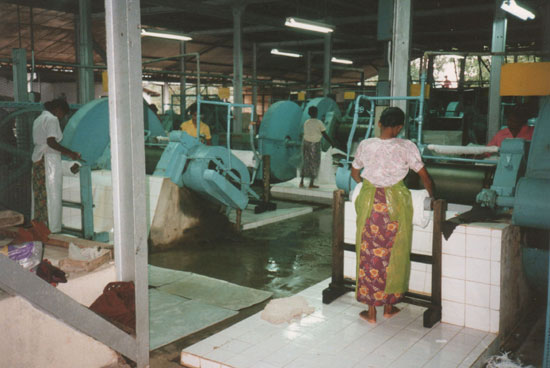
Spooling crepe from last finishing mill

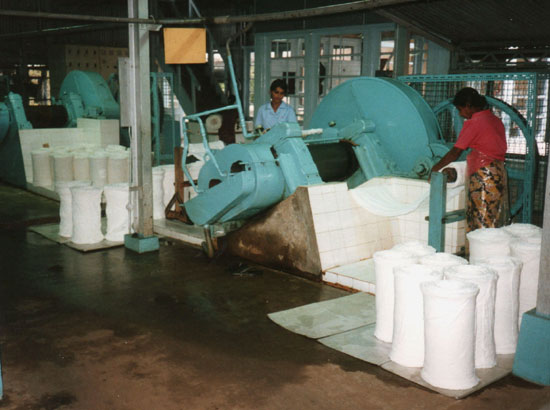
Smooth crepe spooled for transfer to the drying shed

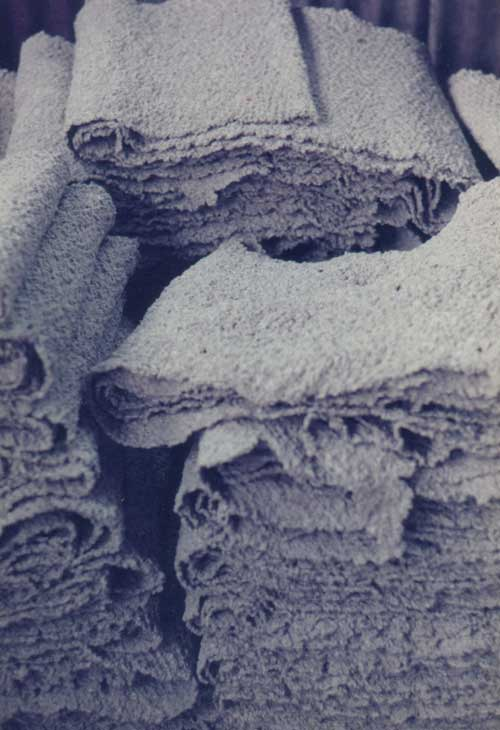
Wet coagulum crepe blanket

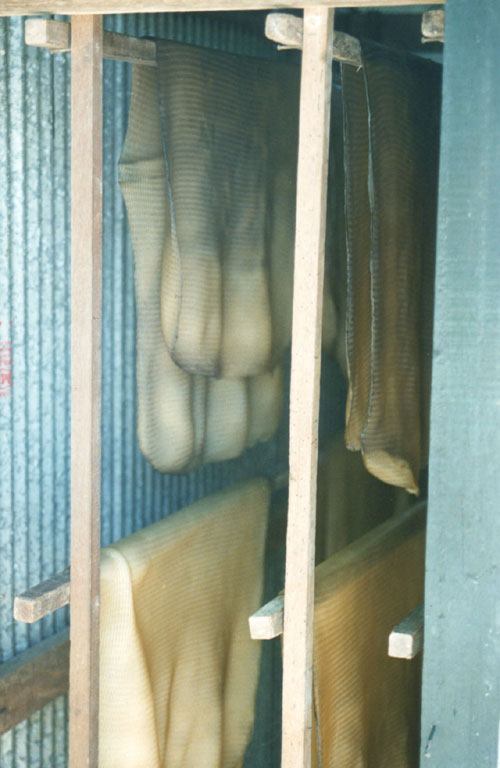
Smallholder's sheet in a drying shed

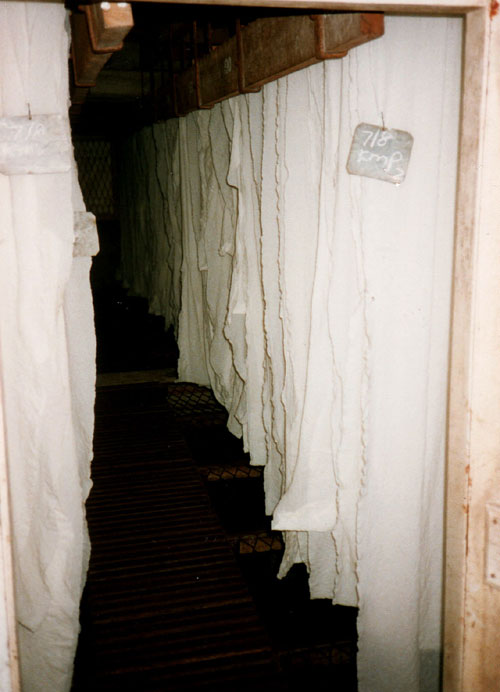
White crepe hanging in a drying shed

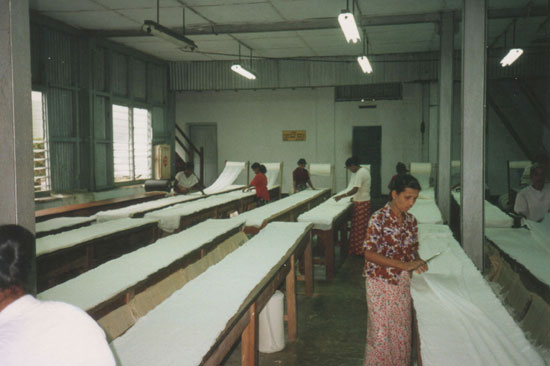
Laminating white crepe for sole crepe

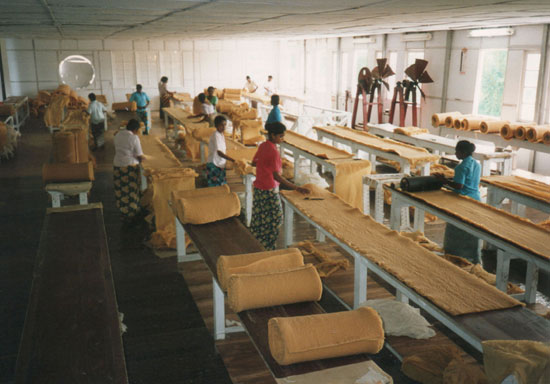
Laminating honey-coloured crepe for sole crepe

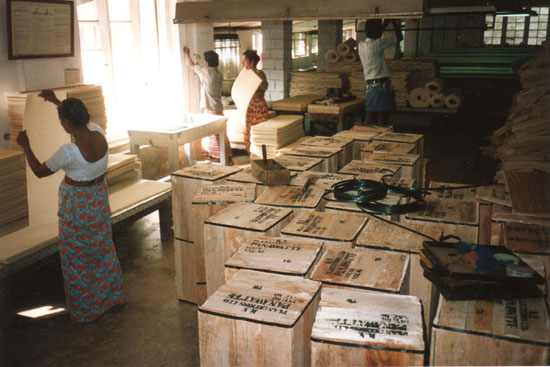
Sole crepe inspection and packing
