= Wholecut =

Shoe made from a single piece of leather

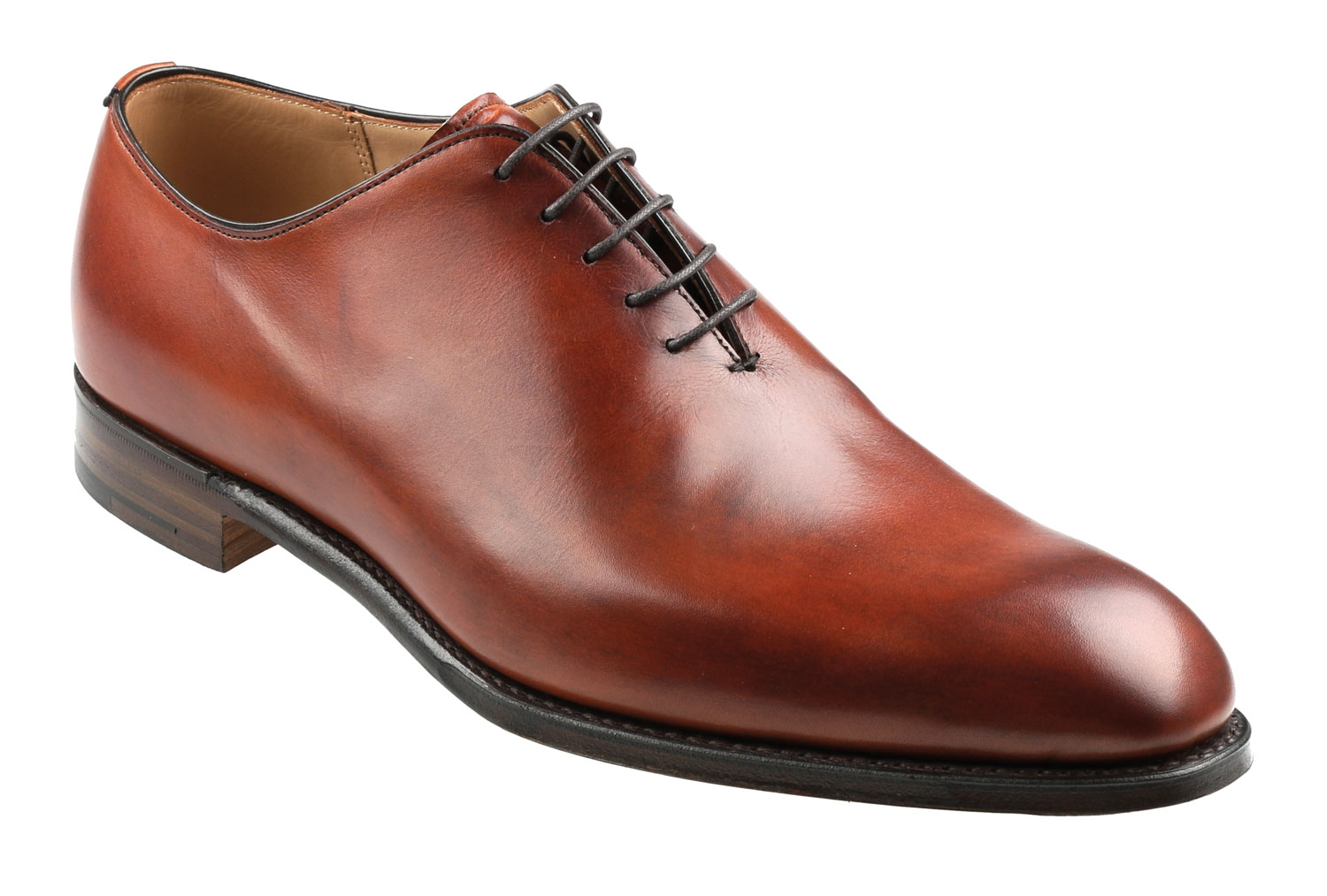
A wholecut shoe

In shoemaking, wholecut shoes are shoes that are made from a single piece of flawless leather (in contrast to plain toes and cap toes), with or without a backseam – in the latter case it is called a seamless wholecut. These shoes can be entirely plain and smooth, or with some perforated decorations.

Various types of shoes can be made wholecut, but usually the term refers to classic dress shoes. The absence of decorative features and overall conservative look tend to make wholecuts appropriate for black-tie occasions.

== Gallery ==
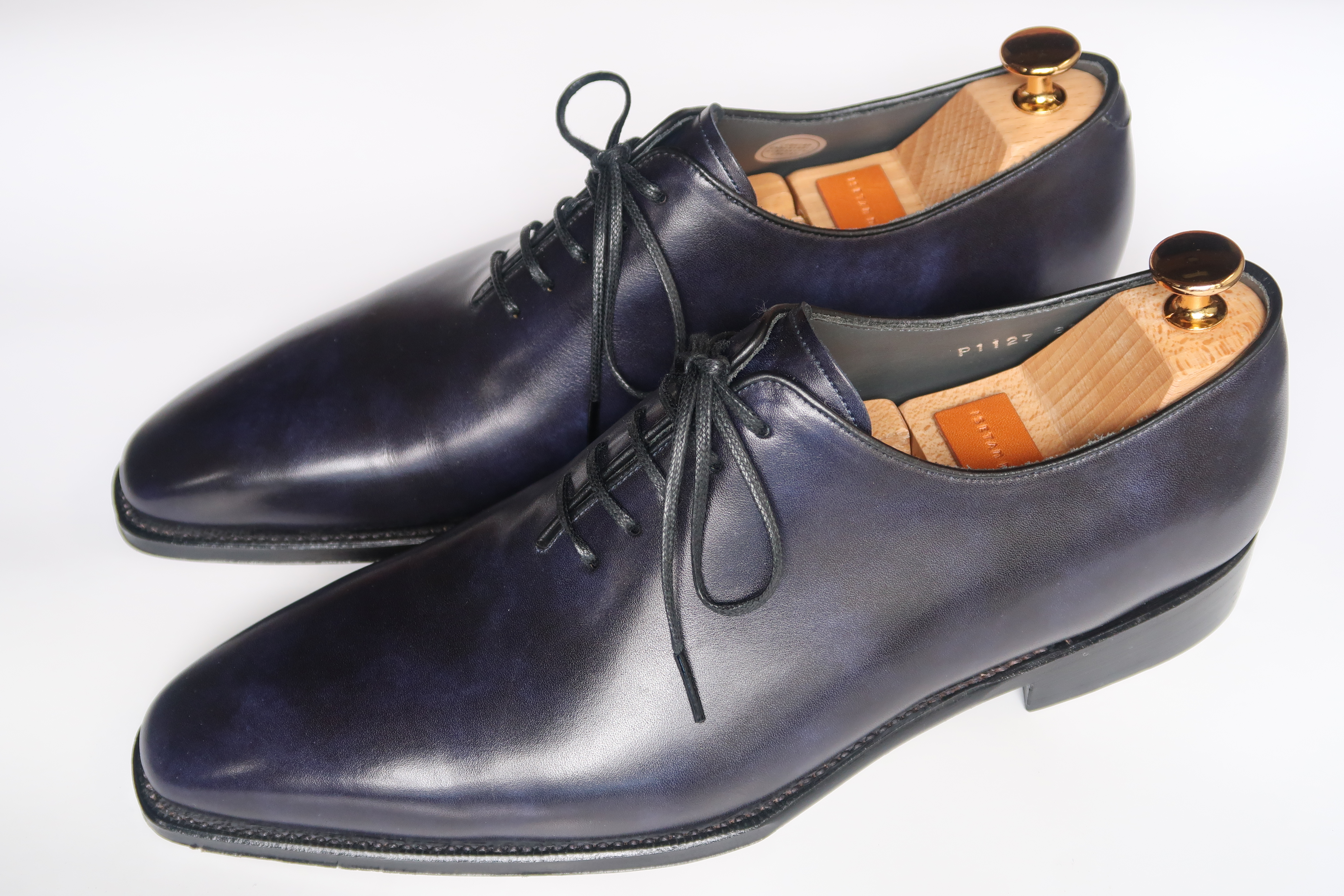
A pair of wholecut shoes

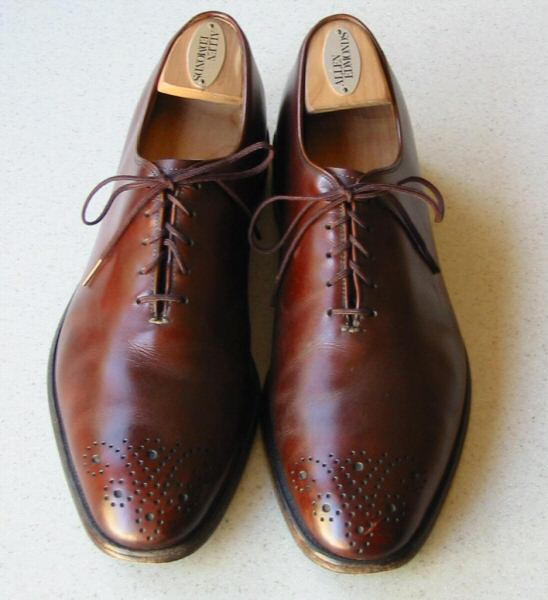
Wholecut with brogue

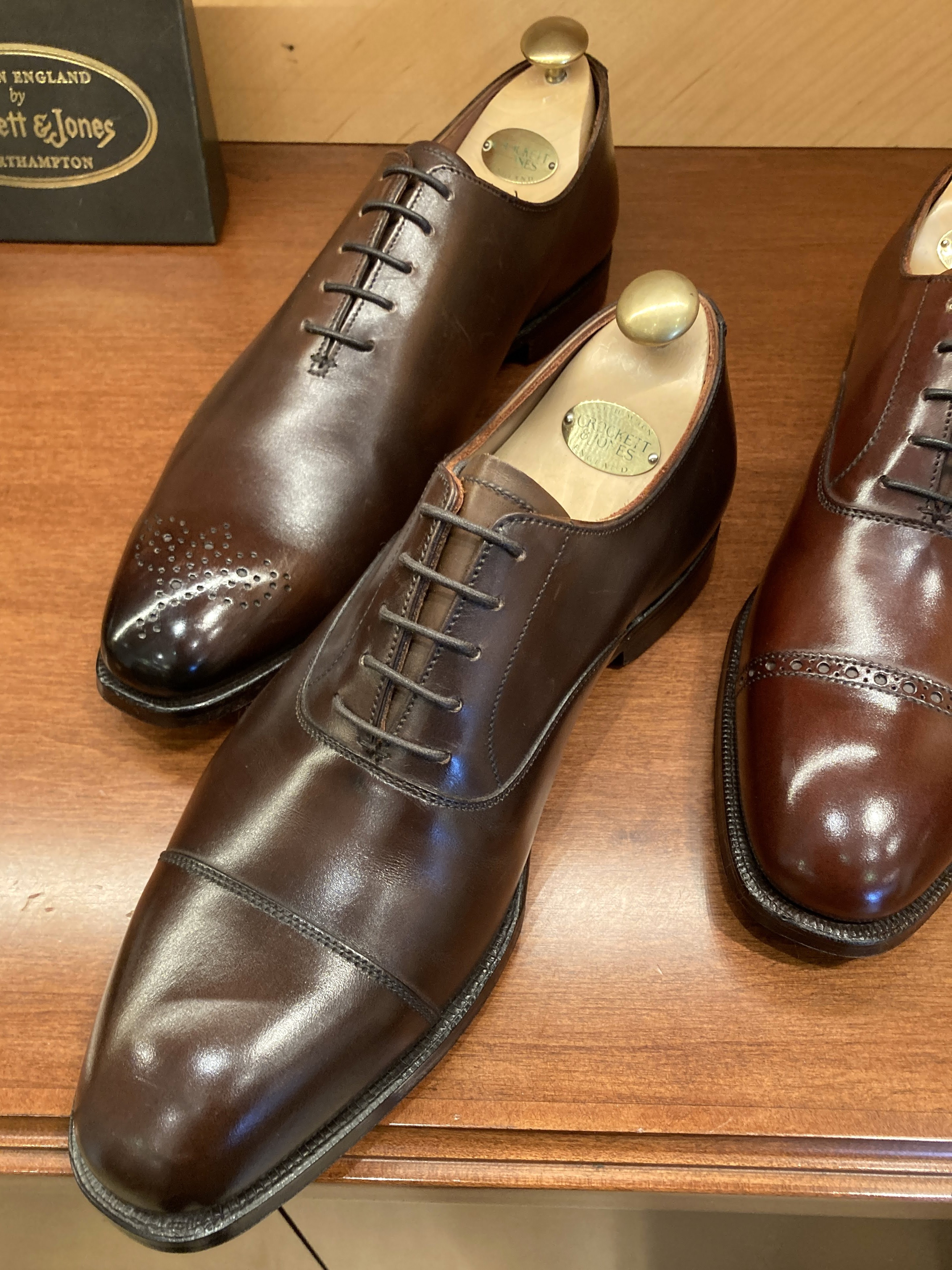
Contrast with plain toe oxfords

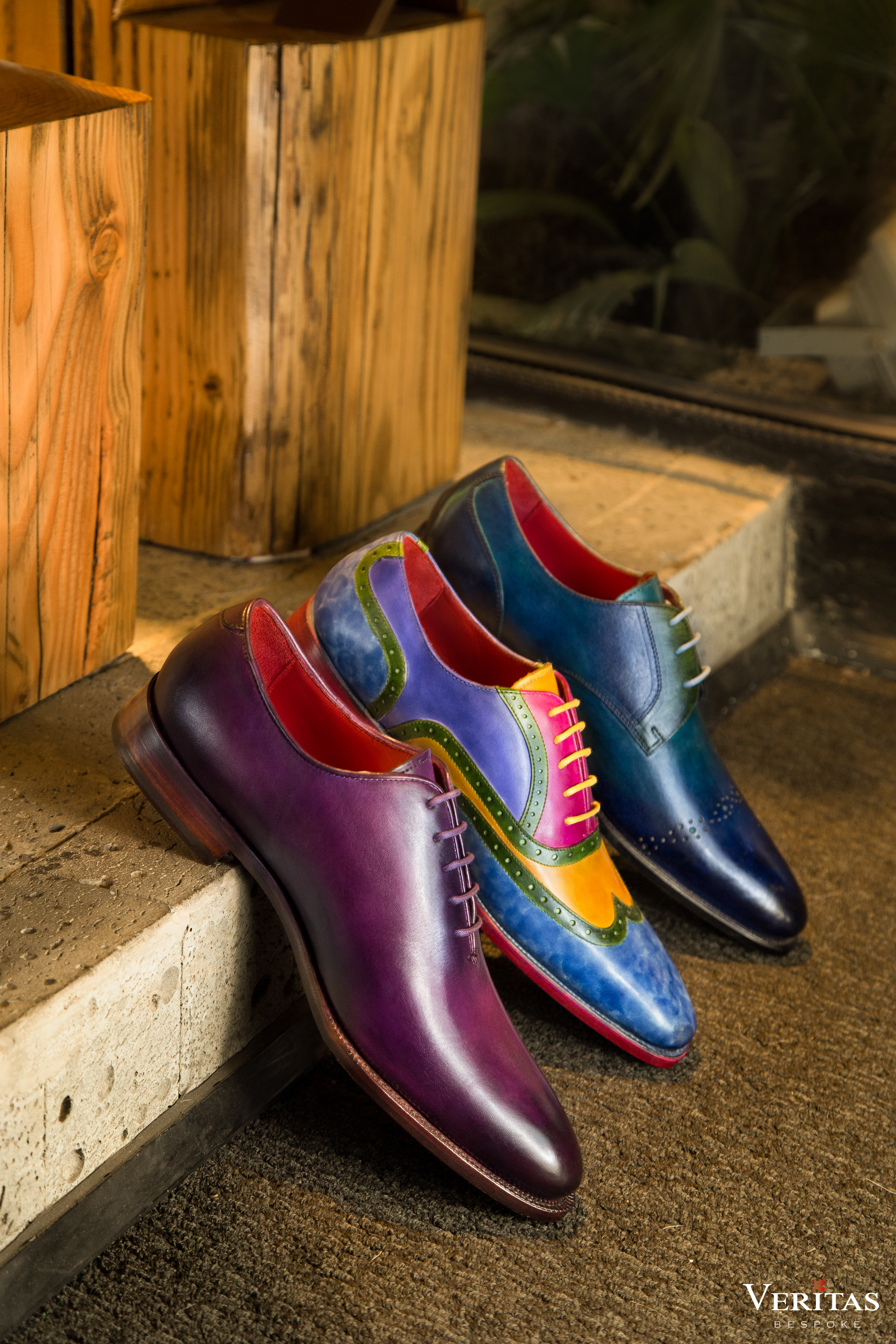
Wholecut with brogue oxford and blucher

== See also ==
- List of shoe styles
- Bespoke shoes
- Blucher shoe
- Brogue shoe
- Derby shoe
- Oxford shoe
