= Monk shoe =

Low shoe closed with a wide strap buckled on the outside

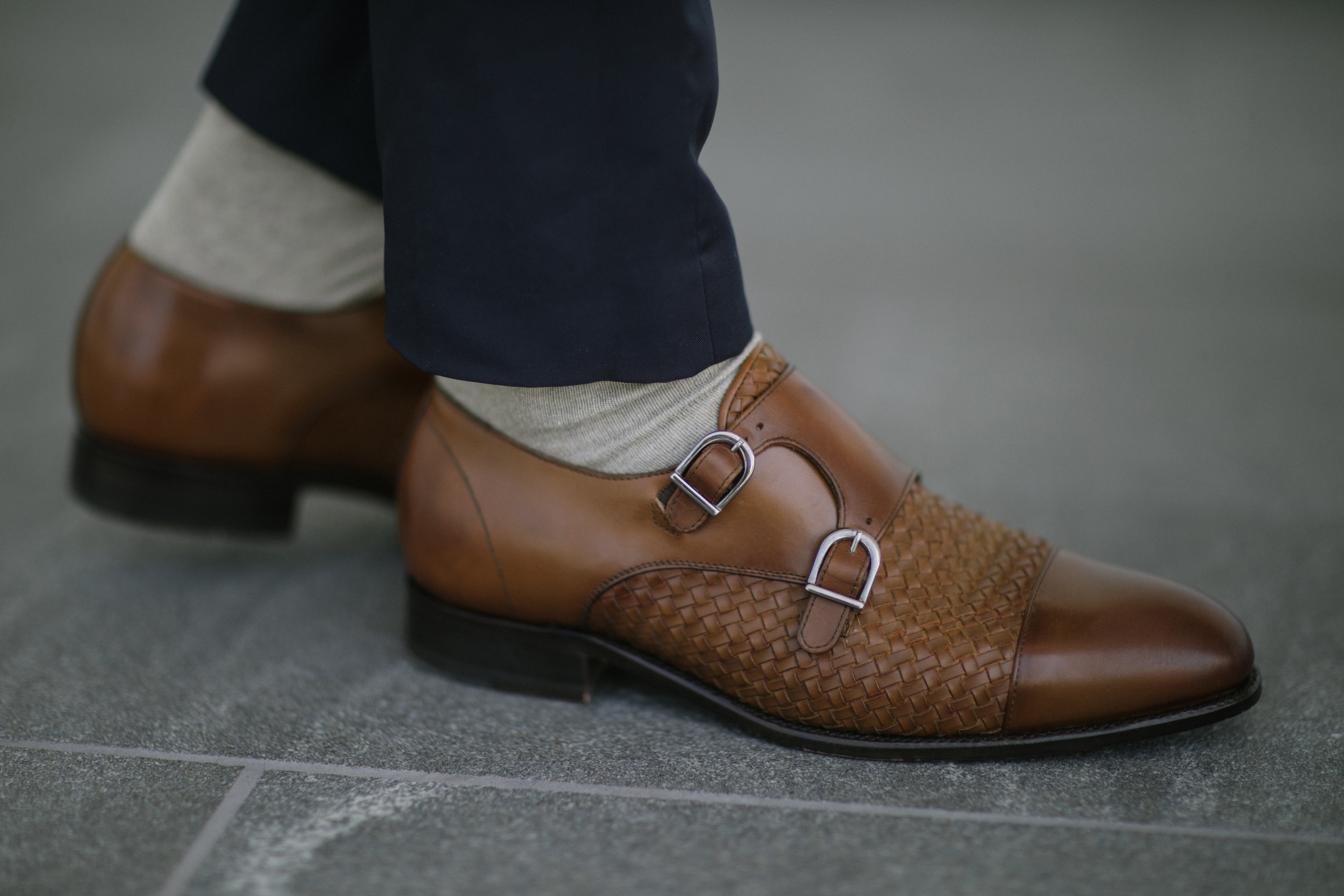
A double monk shoe

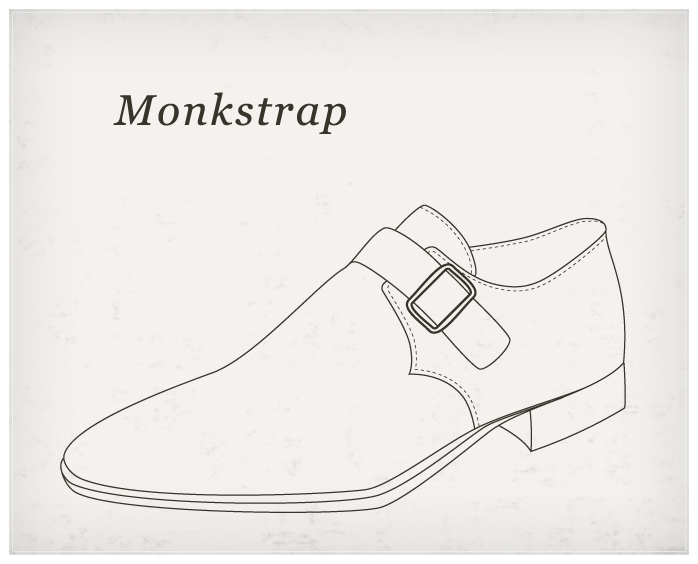
Single-strap monk shoe

A monk shoe or monk strap is a style of dress shoe with no lacing, instead secured on the feet by one or multiple buckles and straps. It was innovated by the English shoe maker Edward Green in the late 19th century.

== Overview ==
Differences between the Monk, the Derby and the Oxford shoe

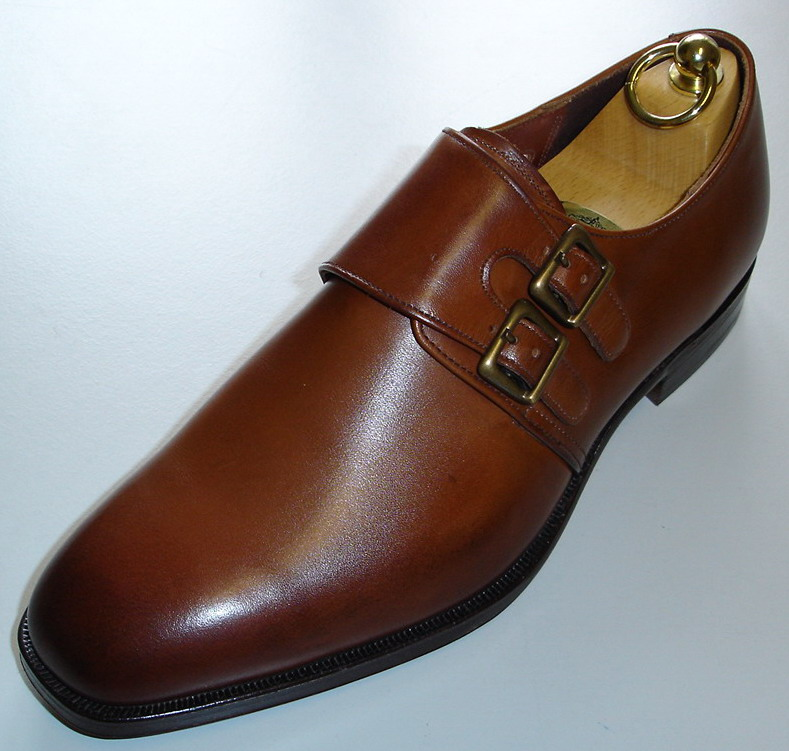
Double monk

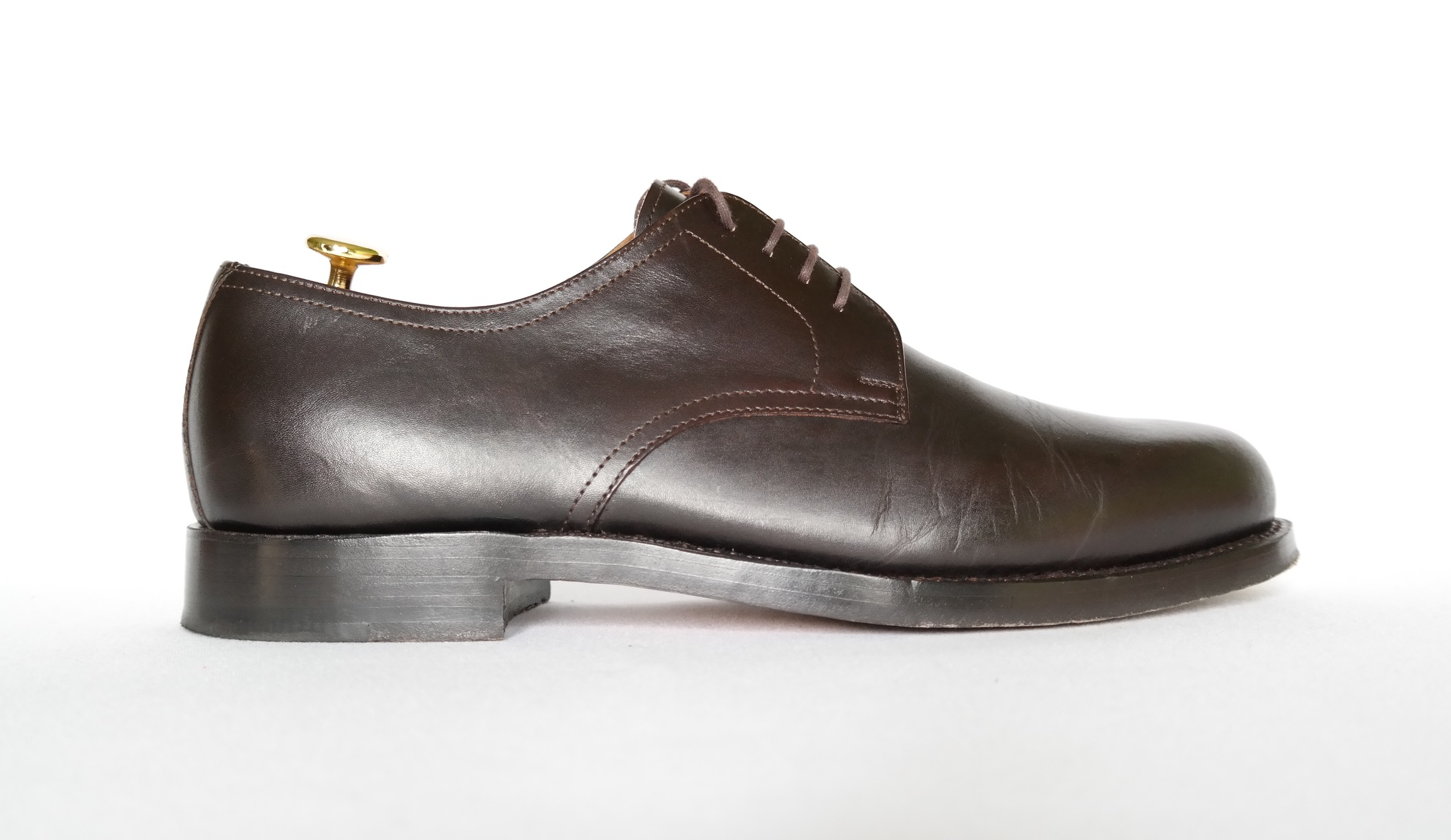
Derby

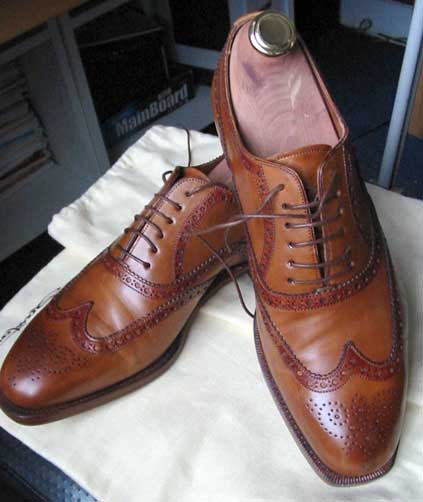
Oxford

The monk shoe is a moderately formal shoe – less formal than a full Oxford (American: Balmoral), but more formal than an open-laced Derby (American: Blücher). In between these, it is one of the main categories of men's shoes.

The monk shoe is described by some specialists in the fashion sector as the most accomplished men's dress shoe. It often has a cap toe, is occasionally brogued, and is popular in suede.

== See also ==
- List of shoe styles

== Publications ==
- Sternke, Helge (2006). Alles über Herrenschuhe (in German). Berlin. ISBN 978-3-89479-252-7. OCLC 180886933.
- McDowell, Colin (1989). Schuhe Schönheit, Mode, Phantasie. München. ISBN 978-3-453-03606-2. OCLC 75129487.
