= Wolf and Shepherd =

Clothing company

Wolf & Shepherd
- Company type: Private
- Founded: 2014
- Founder: Justin Schneider
- Headquarters: Los Angeles, California, U.S.
- Products: Dress shoe
- Website: wolfandshepherd.com

Wolf and Shepherd (styled Wolf & Shepherd) is a men's dress shoe company. The company designs and sells Italian leather dress shoes using technology found in running sneakers. Wolf & Shepherd was founded in 2014 in Jacksonville Beach, Florida. In early 2017, Wolf & Shepherd relocated its headquarters to Los Angeles, California, where the company continues to operate.

== History ==
Wolf & Shepherd was founded in 2014 by footwear designer, Justin Schneider. Prior to starting the company, Schneider was a decathlete competing for the University of Notre Dame. After retiring from competition, Schneider spent five years designing performance shoes and technology for footwear companies such as Adidas, Reebok and New Balance.

The idea for Wolf & Shepherd came when Schneider wanted to update traditionally uncomfortable dress shoes. A friend of Schneider made complaints about the discomfort his wood and nails dress shoes caused him on his commute to work.

Schneider began designing prototypes and experimenting with different technologies. Wolf & Shepherd shoes are designed using high-density ethylene vinyl acetate (HDEVA) cushioning, found in running shoes, a proprietary blend of memory foam and a carbon-fiber arch to provide stability and reduce the weight of the shoe. Schneider took the $25,000 grand prize at the McCloskey Business Plan Competition sponsored by the Mendoza College of Business at Notre Dame.

In 2016, the company competed in the Cupid's Cup Entrepreneur competition in Baltimore, hosted by Under Armour CEO Kevin Plank.

In June 2016, 23-year-old Juris Silenieks won the 'Hotline Half-Marathon', in Atlanta, Georgia, wearing a pair of Wolf & Shepherd Honey Cap Toe Lace-Up shoes. Sileniek's finishing time was named "The Fastest Half-Marathon Won in Dress Shoes".

Founder Justin Schneider was named to the Forbes 30 Under 30 Class of 2017 in the category of Retail in E-commerce.

== Products ==
Wolf and Shepherd shoes are designed and crafted using Italian calf-skin, Parisian waxes and running shoe technology developed in Los Angeles, California. The shoes are hand-sewn in Porto, Portugal. Wolf and Shepherd offers various dress shoe styles including lace-ups, loafers and boots.
