= Longwing =

Longwing may refer to:

- Heliconiinae, a subfamily of brush-footed butterflies commonly called the longwings
- a class of falcons used in falconry
- Longwing brogues, a kind of shoe
