= Dress shoe =

Shoe worn for formal or business dress

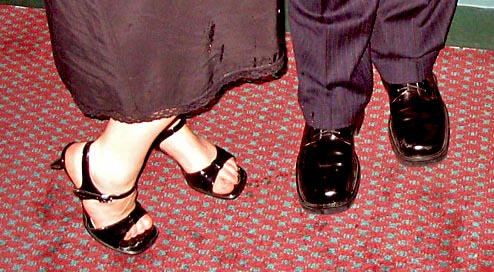
Dress shoes on a woman (left) and a man (right)

A dress shoe (U.S. English) is a shoe to be worn at smart casual or more formal events. A dress shoe is typically contrasted to an athletic shoe.

Dress shoes are worn by many as their standard daily shoes, and are widely used in dance, for parties, and for special occasions.

== Men's dress shoes ==
=== Colors ===
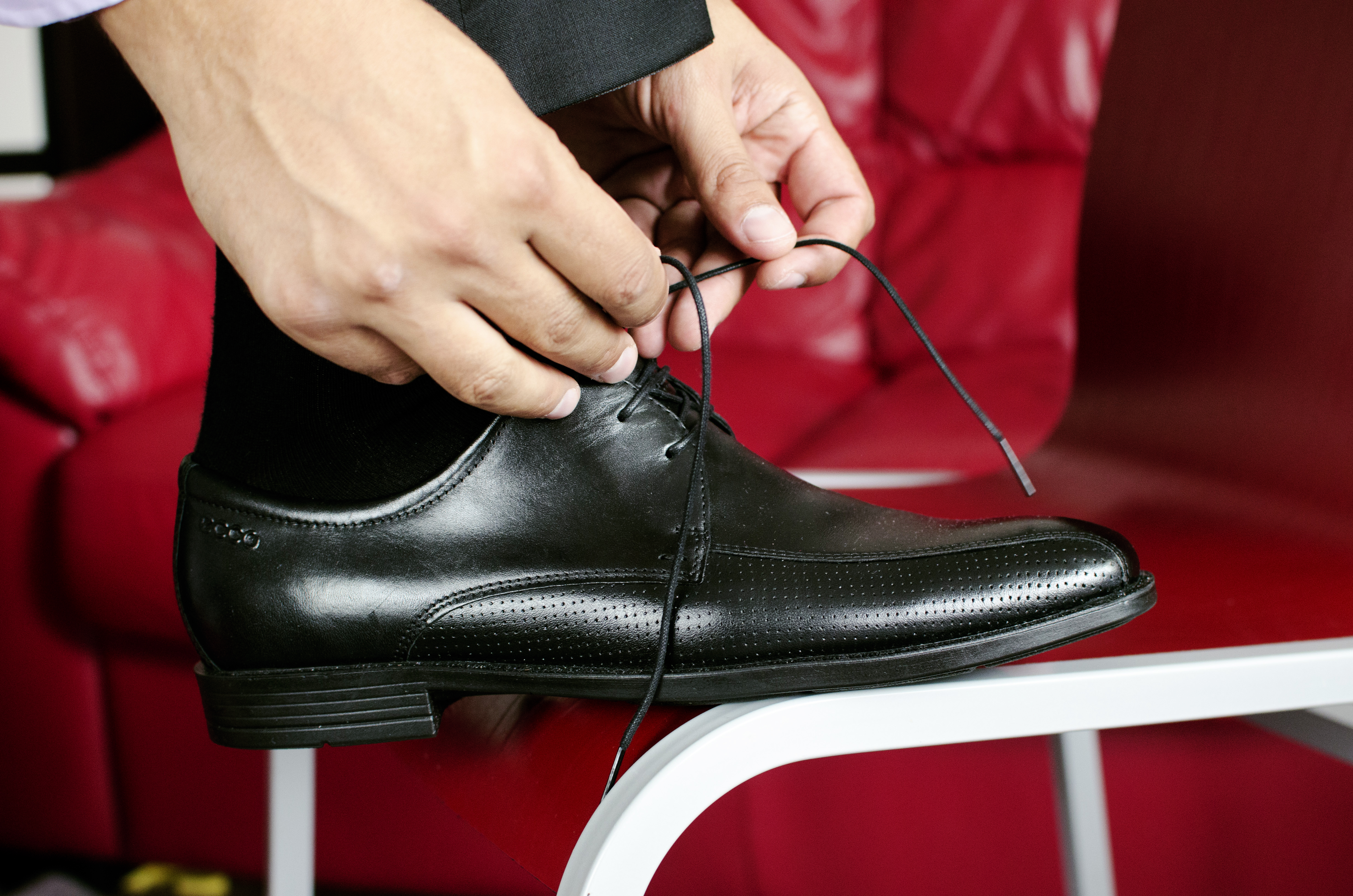
Men's dress shoes (Derby type with open lacing)

Possible colors include:

- Black
- Brown
- Burgundy
- Oxblood
- Chestnut
- Cordovan
- White

Men's dress shoes are most commonly black or brown. Cordovan or oxblood dress shoes are sometimes worn by men in the United States, while the other colors are worn by men of many nationalities.

=== Materials ===
Most men's dress shoes are made of leather, usually entirely, including the outers, lining, and sole, though for more durability at the expense of elegance, many shoes are made with rubber soles. Non-leather men's dress shoes are also available.

Shoes are usually made with many pieces of leather, and the seams can be decorated in various ways, mostly around some type of brogueing. Brogues have rows of decorative punching in patterns: full brogues, or wingtips (the standard American name), have a toe cap in a wavy shape, with punched patterns on various sections of the shoe; half brogues have a normal straight edged toe cap and less punching; and other terms such as quarter-brogue etc. may be used to describe progressively less brogueing. All of the standard styles below may be brogued.

=== Styles ===
Men's shoes are often categorised by their fastening, and the various possibilities are listed below in roughly descending order of formality.

==== Oxfords ====
Oxfords (British), or Balmorals (American), lace up and tie to keep them on the wearer's foot, and have a closed lacing, where the pieces of leather joined by the laces are sewn together at the bottom. Many Oxfords have an additional piece of leather sewn over the toe section, known as a toe cap. Oxfords are the standard shoe to wear with most suits. White Buck shoes are a variant of the oxford that are made of buckskin, and considered the companion to seersucker and other summer suit fabrics.

==== Monk shoes ====
A monk shoe (also called a monkstrap) has no lacing, and is closed by a strap with a buckle. Monk shoes are typically regarded as less formal; they are often considered appropriate for business formal, but rarely appropriate with any kind of formal attire.
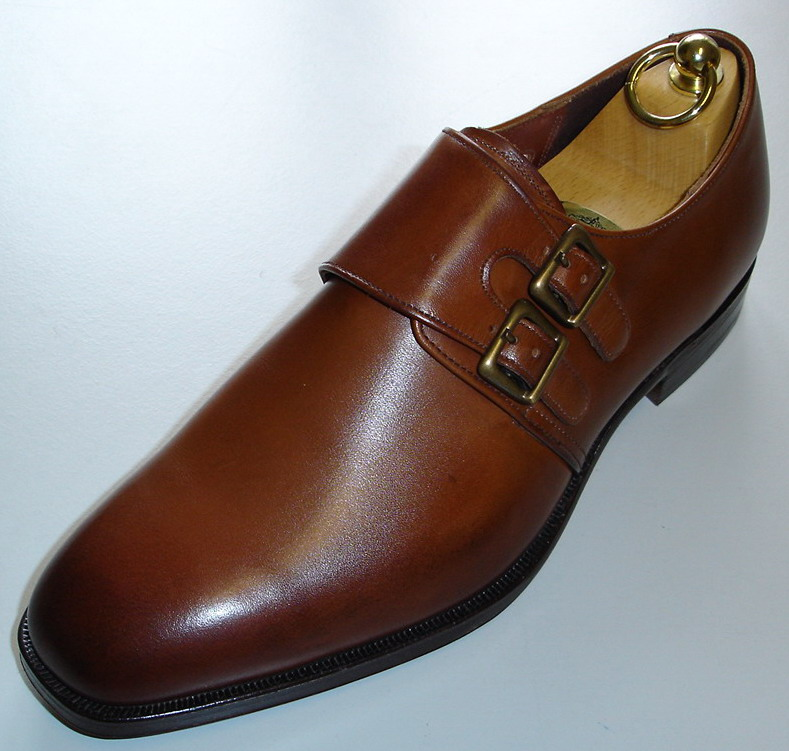

==== Derbies ====
Derbies, or Blüchers in America, are similar to Oxfords, but have open lacing. They are a little less formal, and are often worn in brown, with some brogueing.
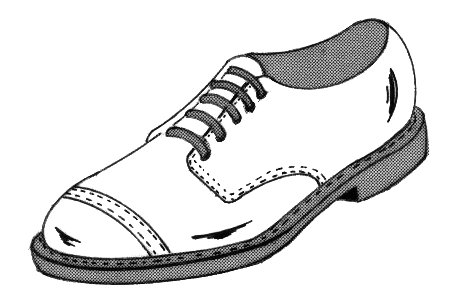

==== Loafers ====
Loafers, or slip-ons, come in both men's and women's styles. It is not unusual for a man's loafer to have a tassel, although this can be seen in women's varieties too. Loafers were originally men's shoes, and are usually thought of as such, although women do now wear them.

==== Other styles ====
In addition to the above, there are various other types of footwear to accompany formal wear, such as boat shoes i.e. Sperrys, the court shoe (also called opera shoe, or patent pumps) for eveningwear and the dress boot for daywear.

== Women's dress shoes ==
=== Colors ===
Women's dress shoes come in a variety of colors, which includes:

- Black
- Silver
- Gold
- Tan
- White
- Red
- Yellow

They may also match the color of the evening gown, dress or suit being worn.

=== Styles ===
==== Pumps ====
Pumps come in a variety of colors and styles. They can have a rounded or pointed toe, and are usually made of leather. They have a heel of at least 5 cm (2 inches). Today, pumps have evolved beyond the classic working woman's shoe. There are peep toe pumps, which have a small opening at the toes, and pumps with ankle straps. Not only have the styles evolved, the fabrics have as well. While almost all pumps used to be made of leather, pumps now come in a variety of materials, such as suede and wool.

==== Slingbacks ====
The slingback is similar to the pump in that it can have a rounded or pointed toe and usually has a heel, but it does not wrap all the way around the heel like pumps usually do. Instead, it has a narrow strap that is pulled up over the heel, leaving the rest of the heel exposed.

==== Loafers ====
Loafers are usually flat and typically thought of as both more masculine and comfortable than anything with a heel. The typical loafer has a round toe, and comes in darker colors, such as black or brown. A spin on the loafer is the cloak, which, like the loafer, is a slip-on shoe, but it has a heel and is considered a more "feminine" design.

==== Mules ====
Mules are shoes that slide onto the foot, and do not cover the heel or the back of the foot at all. These are not considered dress shoes unless they have a heel.

==== Ballet flats ====
The ballet flat had not been a popular fashion trend until some time after the first few years of the 21st century. Taken from the art of ballet, as their name implies, they are flat shoes with a rounded toe, and come in many different colors and patterns. The classic ballet flat has a small bow on the toe, but this style has evolved to include varieties without bows.

==== Sandals ====
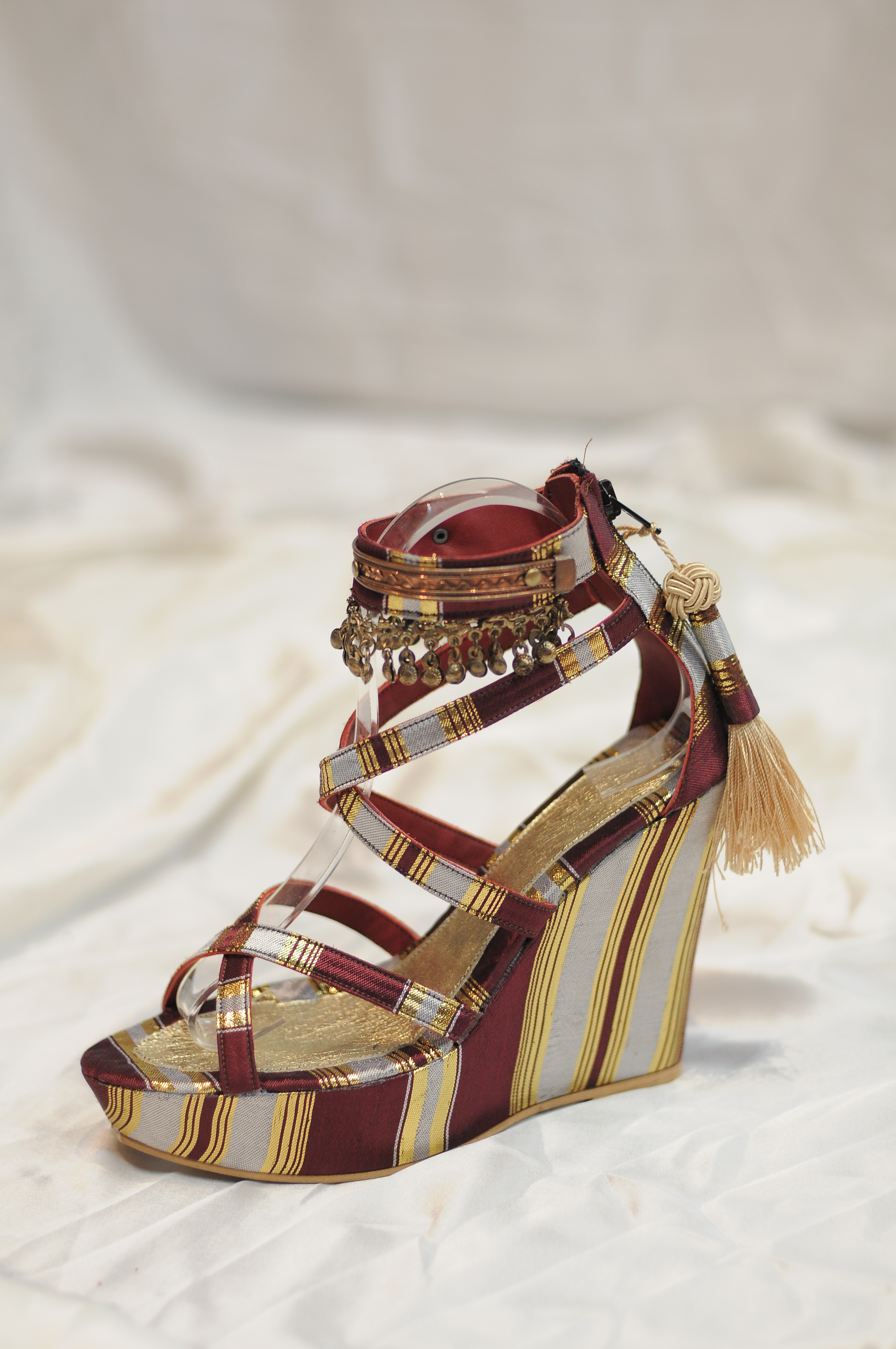
Any sandal that has a heel, many straps, or a shiny finish would probably be acceptable in a more formal atmosphere. Tunisian sandal with high heels

While sandals are usually more casual, there are some sandals that can be worn with dress clothes. For example, any sandal that has a heel, many straps, or a shiny finish would probably be acceptable in a more formal atmosphere. A minor controversy erupted in 2005 when some members of Northwestern University's national champion women's lacrosse team visited the White House wearing flip-flops. Following the criticism, their footwear was eventually auctioned off on eBay to raise money for a young cancer patient, Jaclyn Murphy of Hopewell Junction, New York, who was befriended by the team. Nine pairs of flip-flops raised approximately $1,653. There is still a debate over whether this signaled a fundamental change in American culture; many youth feel that flip-flops are more dressy and can be worn in a variety of social contexts, while older generations feel that wearing them at formal occasions signifies laziness and comfort over style. The Dalai Lama of Tibet is also a frequent wearer of flip-flop sandals and has met with several US presidents, including George W. Bush and Barack Obama, while wearing the sandals.

== See also ==
- List of shoe styles
