= Co-respondent =

Respondent to a petition in English law

In English law, a co-respondent is, in general, a respondent to a petition, or other legal proceeding, along with another or others, or a person called upon to answer in some other way.

== Divorce ==
More particularly, since the Matrimonial Causes Act 1857, in a petition for divorce on the ground of adultery, a co-respondent is a person charged with misconduct with the petitioner's spouse.

As of 2007, alleged parties to a spouse's adultery must be made co-respondents unless they are not named in the petition or the court directs otherwise.

In practice, naming such parties in a divorce petition is discouraged as it may become a barrier to reconciliation. Such parties are only commonly named if the petitioner is seeking costs against them or has some other particular reason.

== See also ==
- Co-respondent shoe

== Bibliography ==
- Bond, T; et al. (2007). Family Law (Blackstone Legal Practice Course Guides ed.). Oxford: Oxford University Press. ISBN 978-0-19-920545-5.
- The Law Society (2006). Family Law Protocol (2nd rev. ed.). London: The Law Society. ISBN 1-85328-984-1.
