= Spectator shoe =

Style of low-heeled shoe

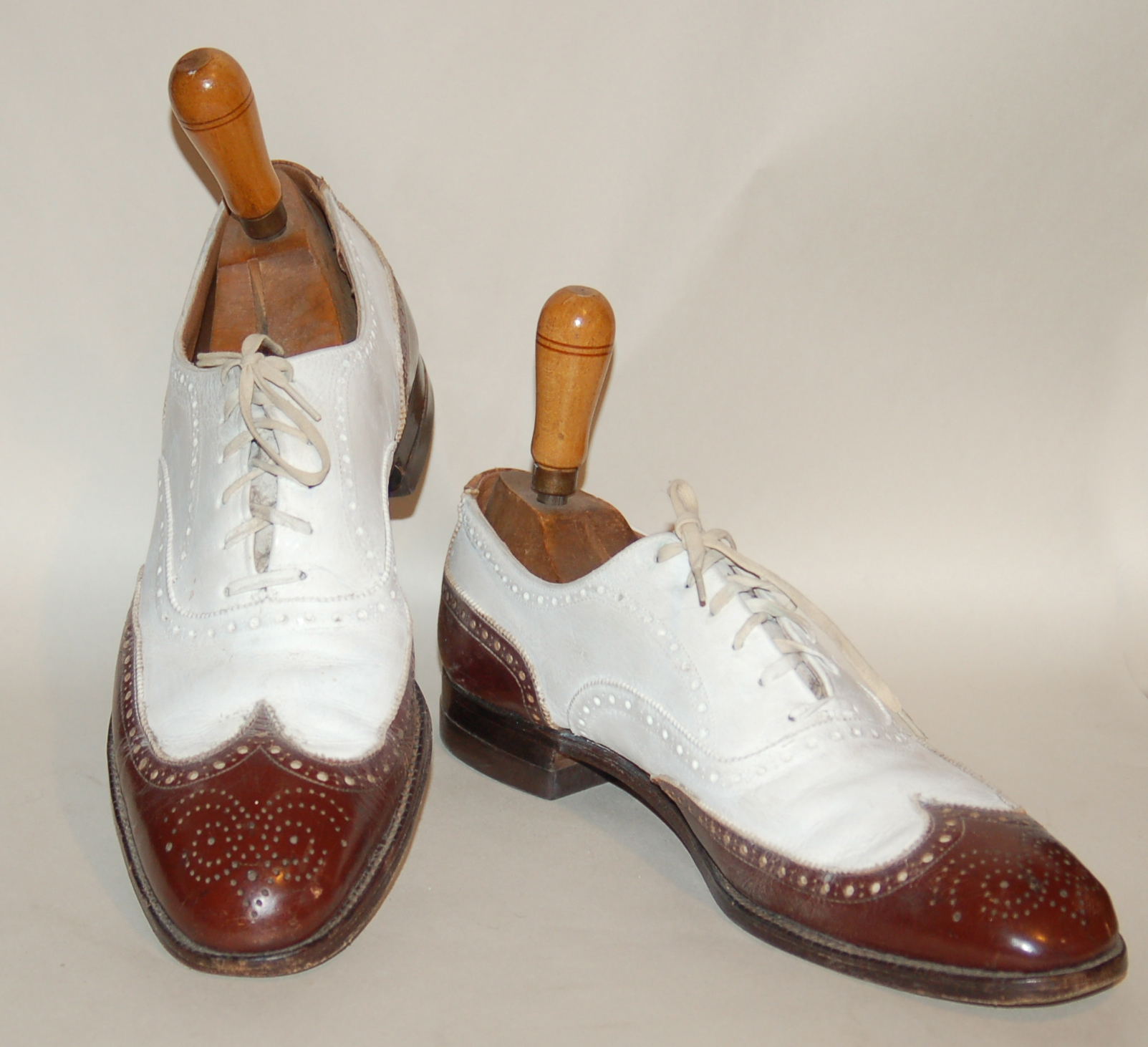
Men's Oxford full brogue spectator shoes, c. 1930

The spectator shoe, also known as co-respondent shoe, is a style of low-heeled, oxford, semi-brogue or full brogue constructed from two contrasting colours, typically having the toe and heel cap and sometimes the lace panels in a darker colour than the main body of the shoe. This style of shoe dates from the nineteenth century but reached the height of popularity during the 1920s and 1930s.

== Description ==
Common colour combinations include a white shoe body with black, brown or tan toe and heel caps, but other colours can be used. The spectator is typically an all leather shoe, but can be constructed using a canvas, mesh or suede body. The spectator was originally constructed of willow calf leather and white buck or reverse calf suede. The white portion was sometimes made from a mesh material, for better ventilation in hot weather.

== Saddle shoe ==
The saddle shoe, another style of two-tone oxford shoe, can be distinguished from the spectator shoe by noting the saddle shoe's plain toe and distinctive, saddle-shaped decorative panel placed mid foot.

== Origin of name ==
The English shoemaker John Lobb claimed to have designed the first spectator shoe as a cricket shoe in 1868.

In the 1920s and 1930s in England, this style was considered too flamboyant for a gentleman, and therefore was called a tasteless style. Because the style was popular among lounge lizards and cads, who were sometimes associated with divorce cases, a nickname for the style was co-respondent shoe. This was wordplay on the 'corresponding leather' colour arrangement on the shoe, and because "co-respondent" is the legal description of a third party caught in flagrante delicto with the guilty party in a case of adultery. Wallis Simpson was famed for wearing this style, although it was said that she was an adulteress and that it was Edward VIII who acted the part of co-respondent.

== In popular culture ==
In J. G. Ballard's 1984 novel and Steven Spielberg's 1987 film Empire of the Sun, protagonist Jim Graham (Christian Bale) covets a fellow prisoner's spectator golf shoes. After the prisoner dies, he is given the shoes as a gift from Dr. Ransome (Nigel Havers).

In the 1992 film Hoffa, Jack Nicholson and Danny DeVito were supplied with spectators from Wisconsin shoemaker Allen Edmonds (specifically the Broadstreet model).

In the 1920s-set crime drama, Boardwalk Empire, the character Enoch "Nucky" Thompson, can be seen wearing tan-and-black spectators, especially in the opening credits sequence.

In Vikram Seth's novel and television adaptation A Suitable Boy, Haresh Khanna is a manager of a shoe factory who is disparaged for his 'co-respondent shoes'.

In Doctor Who, the Seventh Doctor (Sylvester McCoy) wore a pair of spectator shoes.

In the 2020 film Tenet, Neil can be seen wearing spectator shoes.

In Kate Atkinson's 2022 novel Shrines of Gaity, set in 1926 London, the character Landor wears co-respondent shoes.

== See also ==
- List of shoe styles
