= Blucher shoe =

Shoe style

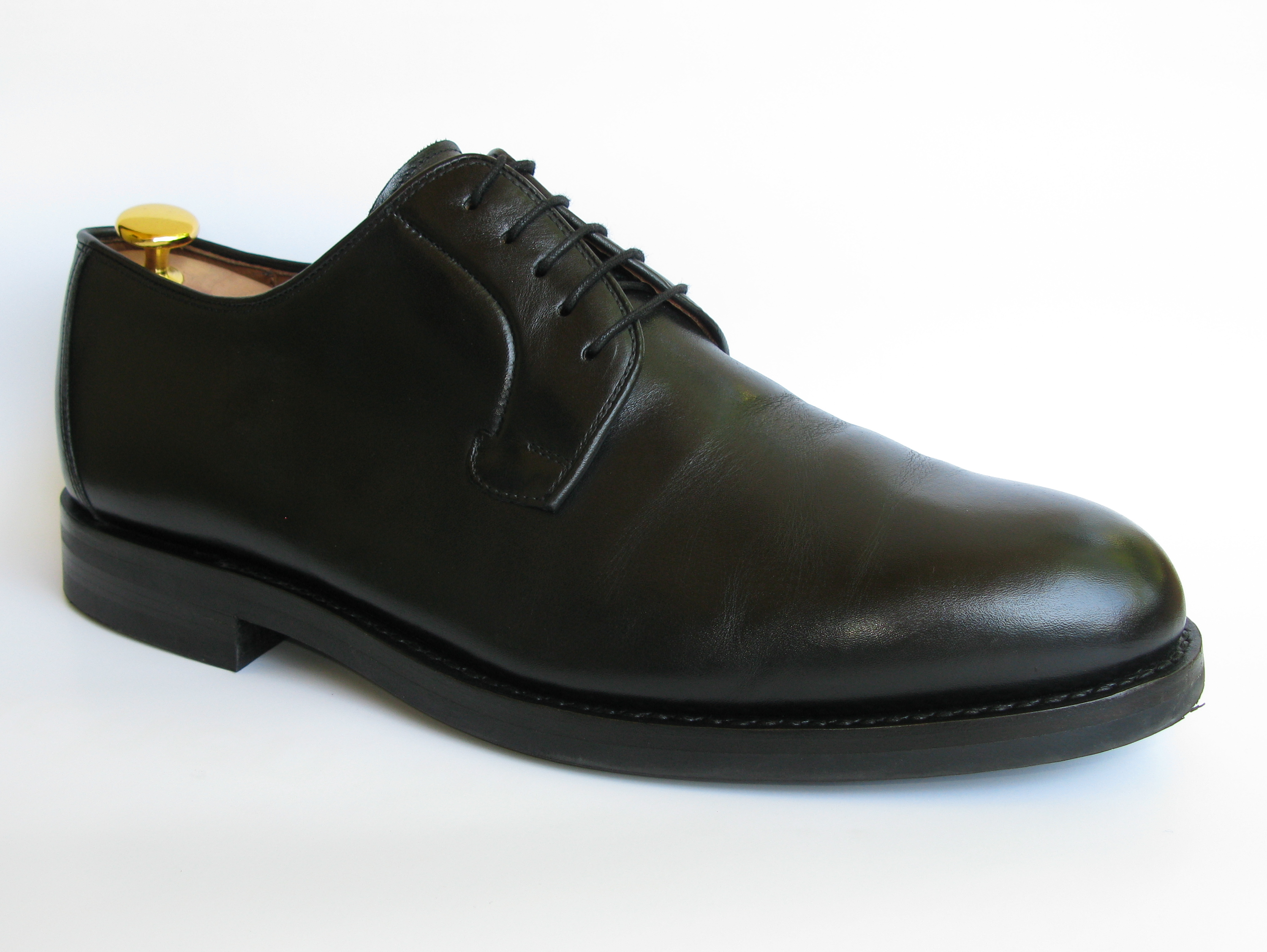
A black blucher shoe

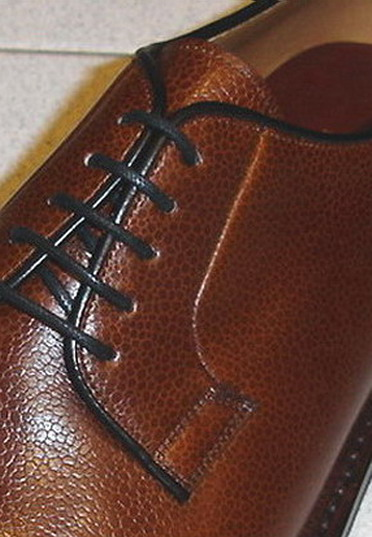
Open lacing with vamp in one piece – the hallmark of a blucher shoe

A blucher ( /ˈbluːtʃər/ or /ˈbluːkər/, German pronunciation: [ˈblʏçɐ], Blücher) is a style of lace-up shoe with its vamp made of a single piece of leather ("one cut"), atop which are sewn its eyestays, which contain the shoelace eyelets, an attribute called "open lacing."

The blucher is similar to a derby since both feature open lacing, in contrast to the Oxford shoe, which fastens the vamp on over the eyestays ("closed lacing"). However, in the derby, the upper's vamp is separate from its large quarters, while in the blucher, the upper is made of one cut. In American English, these distinctions are sometimes elided, "blucher" also being used to refer to derby shoes and "Oxford" to refer to bluchers.

The blucher is named after the 18th-century Prussian Field Marshal Gebhard Leberecht von Blücher, who commissioned a boot with side pieces lapped over the front in an effort to provide his troops with improved footwear. The design was adopted by armies across Europe.

== See also ==
- List of shoe styles
