= Brogue shoe =

Style of low-heeled shoe or boot decorated with perforations

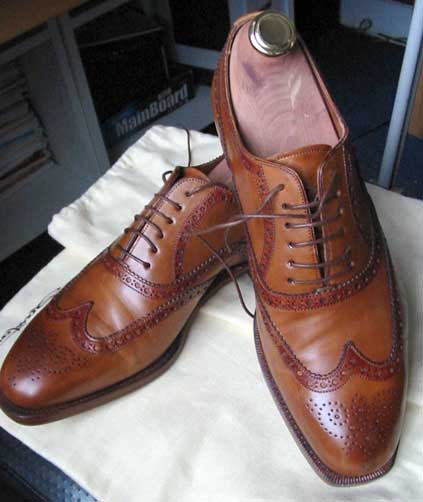
Pair of full brogue shoes

The brogue (from Scottish Gaelic bròg and Irish Gaelic bróg, both meaning "shoe") is a style of low-heeled shoe or boot traditionally characterised by multiple-piece, sturdy leather uppers with decorative perforations (or "broguing") and serration along the pieces' visible edges.

Brogues were traditionally considered to be outdoor or country footwear, as the perforations were originally intended to allow the upper to dry more quickly in wet climates. As such, they were otherwise considered not appropriate for casual or business occasions, but brogues are now considered appropriate in most contexts. Brogues are most commonly found in one of four toe cap styles — full or "wingtip", semi-, quarter and longwing — and four closure styles, namely Oxford, Derby, ghillie, and monk. Today, as well as their typical form of sturdy leather shoes or boots, brogues may take the form of business dress shoes, sneakers, high-heeled women's shoes, or any other shoe form that utilises or evokes the multi-piece construction and perforated, serrated piece edges characteristic of brogues.

== History ==
Modern brogues trace their roots to a rudimentary shoe originating in Ireland and Scotland that was constructed using untanned hide. Modern brogues feature decorative perforations. These are often said to stem from the original Irish brogues as well, specifically from holes intended to allow water to drain from the shoes when the wearer crossed wet terrain such as a bog. However, contemporaneous descriptions of the original brogues do not mention such holes. Nevertheless, the practice of adding holes to shoes was no doubt a normal practice for, according to JG McKay in "Notes of a Pair of Pampooties" in 1894, in a letter to Henry VIII of 1543, a Scot named John Elder describes making holes in a type of shoe made from uncured leather, called a pampootie, which was so common in Scotland that the England named the Scots for it, as "rough-footed Scots". The word "brogue" came into English in the late sixteenth century. It comes from Scottish Gaelic bròg and Irish Gaelic bróg, both meaning "shoe" (from Old Norse brók, meaning "leg covering"). The Scots word brogue is also used to denote a bradawl or boring tool as well as the action of piercing with such a tool.

The word "brogue" was first used to describe a form of outdoor, country walking shoe in the early twentieth century traditionally worn by men. At that time the brogue was not considered to be appropriate for other occasions, social or business. Over time, perceptions have changed and brogues are now considered appropriate footwear in most contexts, including business. Brogues continue to be most common as leather dress shoes, casual shoes and boots, but can be found in other forms including canvas and leather sneakers and high-heeled women's shoes.

== Styles ==
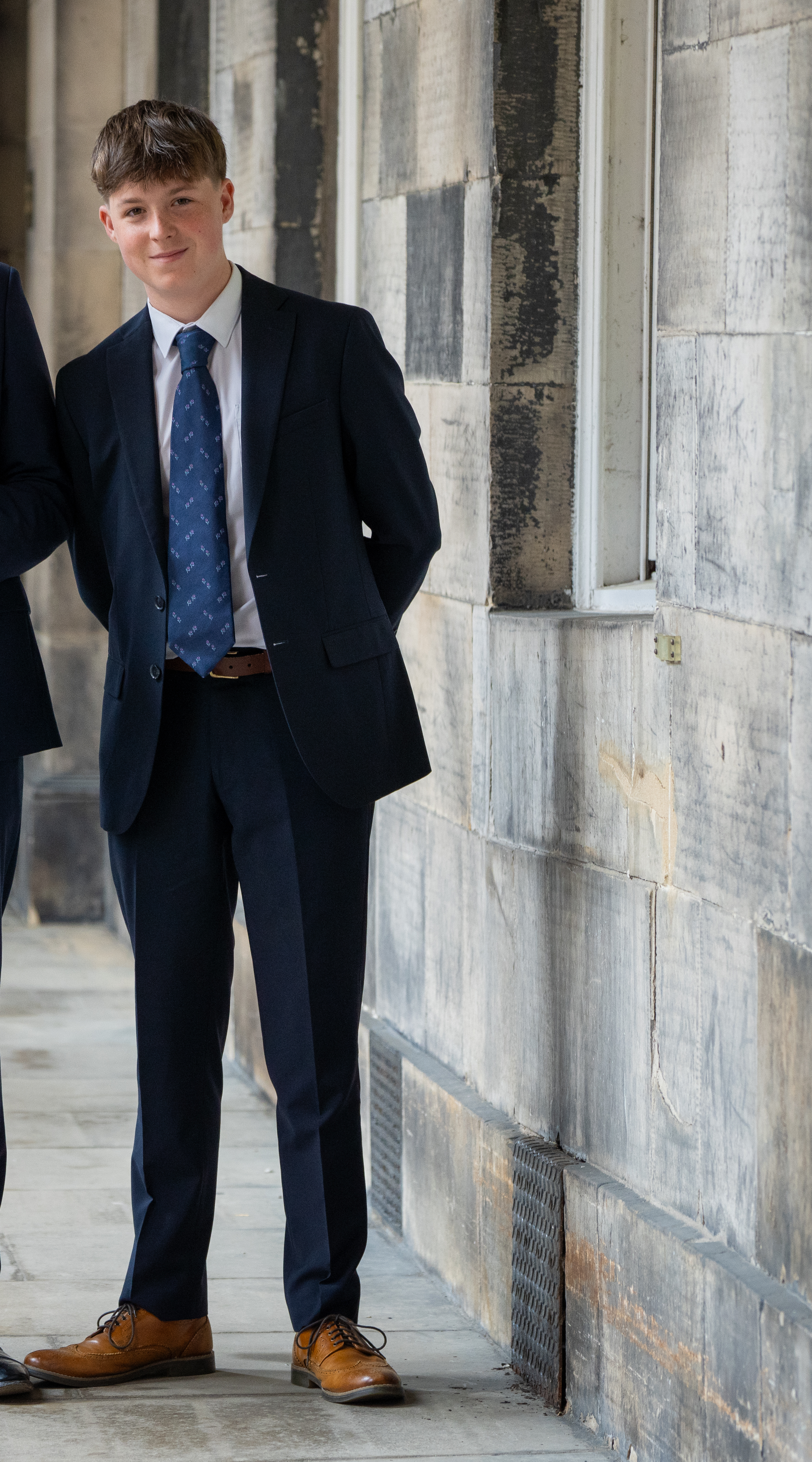
A Scottish teenager wearing a pair of brown brogues

Brogue styles are determined by the shape of the toe cap (a separate piece of leather or material added over the toe box) and include the commonly available full brogue (or "wingtip" in the United States), semi-brogue and quarter brogue styles, and may be found in the less common longwing brogue style. Closure style is not a defining characteristic of the brogue and therefore brogues can be found in closure styles that include laced Oxford, Derby or ghillie styles, but can be found as buckle and monk strap shoes and slip-on shoes with or without elastic closures. Most commonly offered as a leather dress shoe, brogues may also come in the form of boots, canvas or leather sneakers, or any other shoe type that includes or evokes the multi-piece construction and perforated, serrated edges characteristic of brogues.

- Full brogues (also known as wingtips) are characterised by a pointed toe cap with extensions (wings) that run along both sides of the toe, terminating near the ball of the foot. Viewed from the top, this toe cap style is W-shaped and looks similar to a bird with extended wings, explaining the style name "wingtips" that is commonly used in the United States. The toe cap of a full brogue is both perforated and serrated along its edges, and includes additional decorative perforations in the centre of the toe cap called the medallion.
  - Austerity brogue has a wingtip-shaped toe cap without perforations.
  - Blind brogue has no actual toe cap, but has perforations in the shape of the wingtip-style as if it had a toe cap.
- Semi-brogues or half brogues are characterised by a straight-edged toe cap with decorative perforations and serration along the cap's edge and includes additional decorative perforations in the centre of the toe cap, called a medallion. The half brogue was first designed and produced by John Lobb Ltd. as an Oxford in the early 1900s when shoes first began to take the place of boots, in an effort to offer customers a shoe more stylish than a plain oxford, yet not as bold as a full brogue.
- Quarter brogues are characterised by a toe cap with decorative perforations and serrations only along the cap's edge, and omit the decorative perforations in the centre of the toe cap (no medallion). Quarter brogues are more formal than semi brogues and full brogues; they are the most formal of dress shoes with brogueing, making them ideal to pair with business attire.
- Longwing brogues are characterised by wings that extend the full length of the shoe, meeting at a centre seam at the heel. Longwing Derby brogues were most popular in the US during the 1970s, and although the popularity of this style has decreased, it remains available on the market. Longwing brogues are also known as "American" brogues.
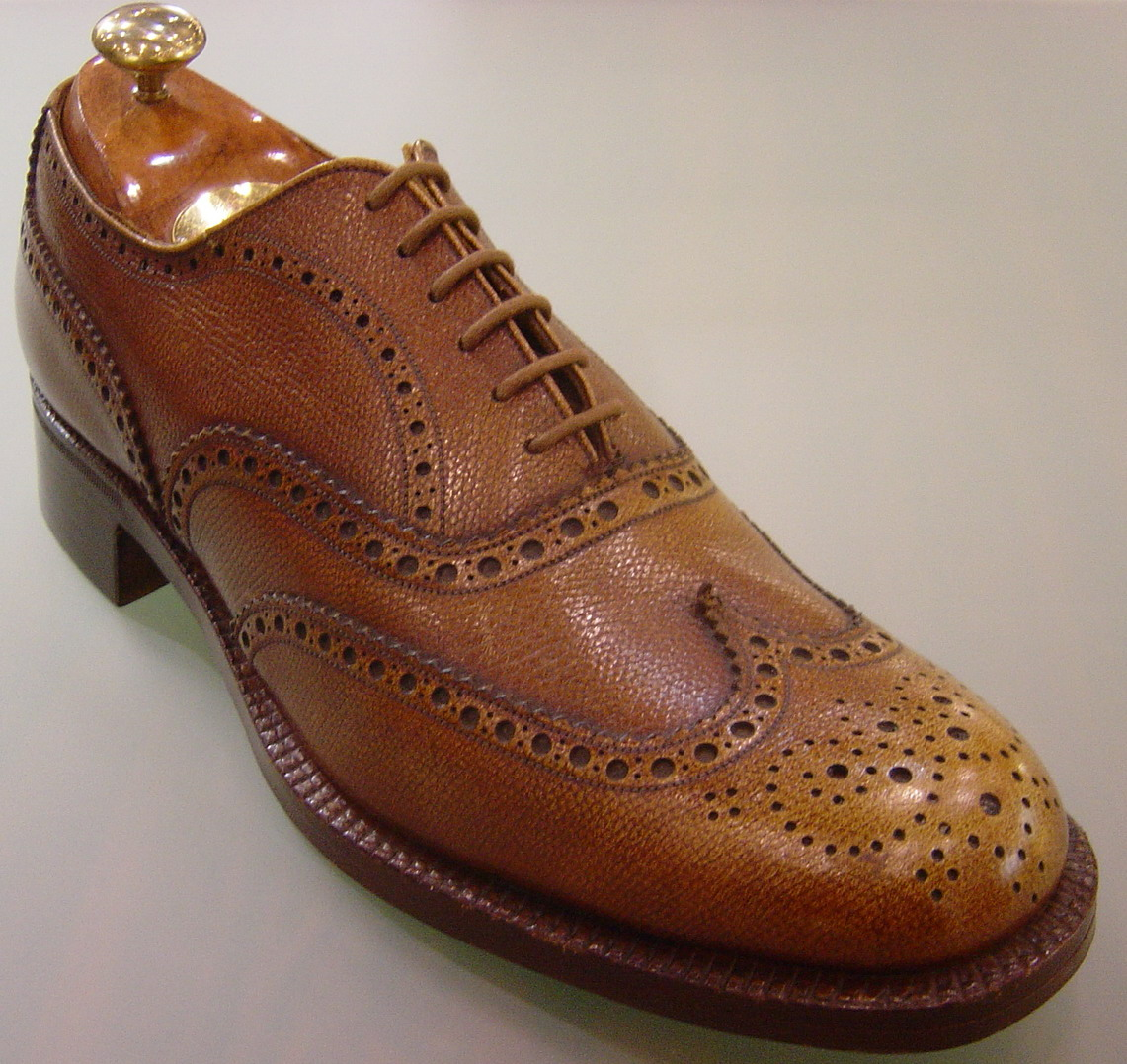
Full brogue

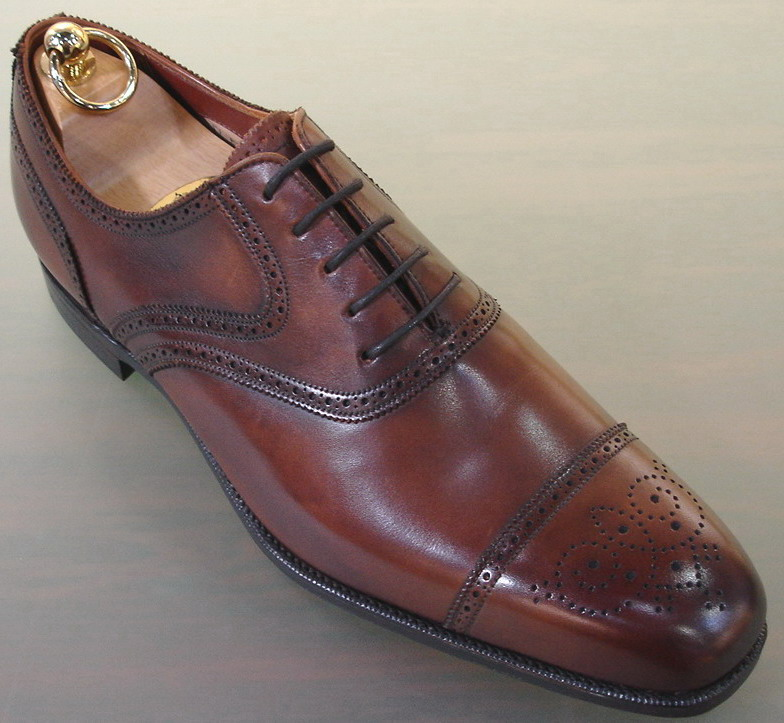
Semi-brogue

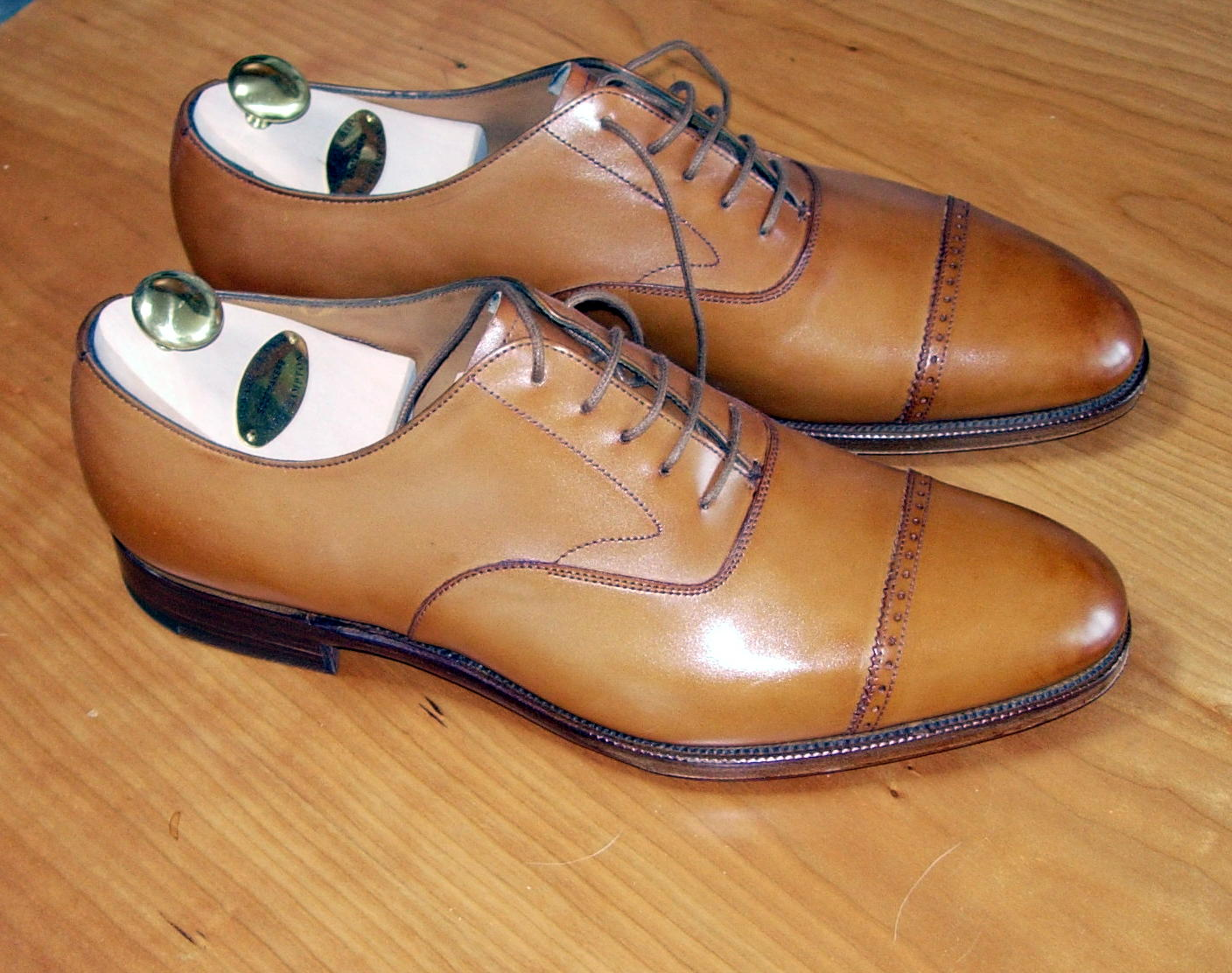
Quarter brogues

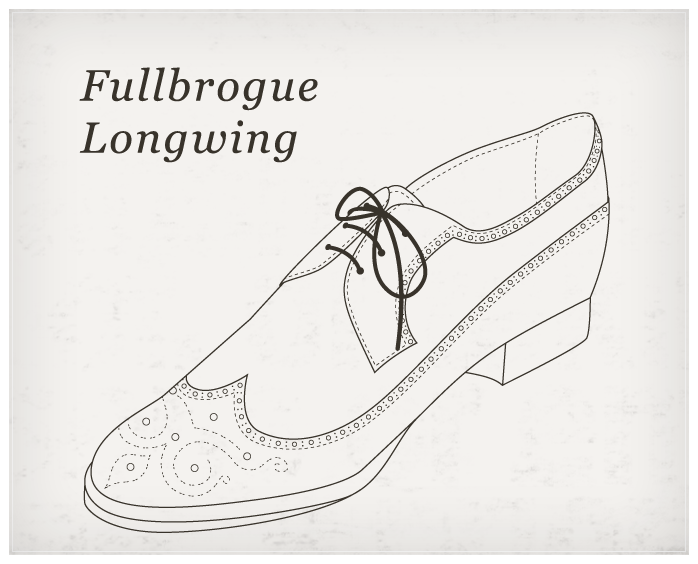
Longwing brogue
- Spectator shoes, or co-respondent shoes in British English, are full brogue Oxfords constructed from two contrasting colours, typically having the toe and heel cap and sometimes the lace panels in a darker colour than the main body of the shoe. Common colour combinations include a white shoe body with either black or tan caps, but other colours can be used.
- Ghillie brogues are a full brogue with no tongue to facilitate drying, and long laces that wrap around the leg above the ankle and tie below the calf to facilitate keeping the tie clear of mud. Despite the original functional aspects of their design, ghillie brogues are now most commonly seen as a component of traditional Scottish Highland dress. Not to be confused with dance ghillies, which have similar lacing but are soft-soled like ballet shoes.
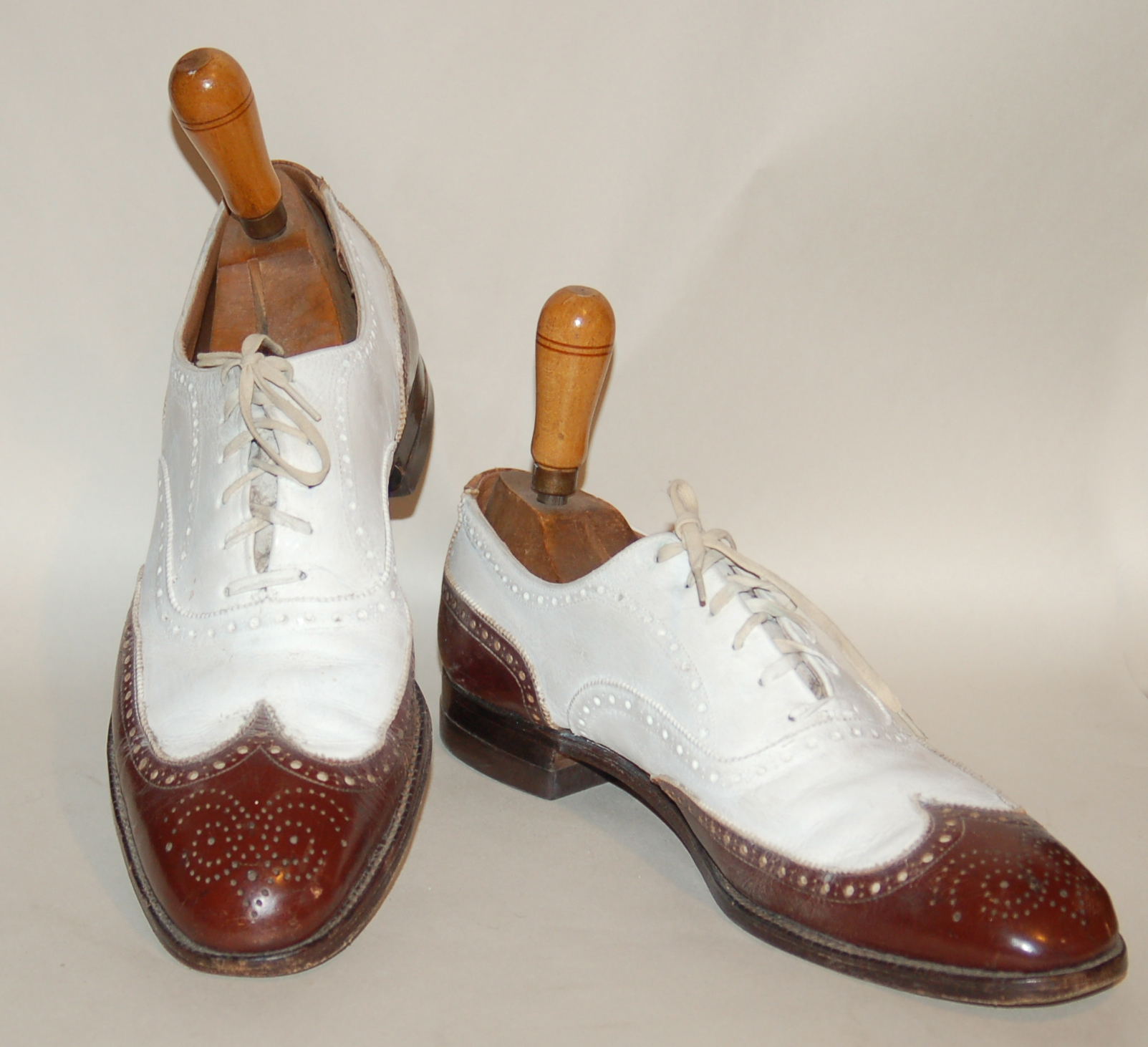
Spectator shoes

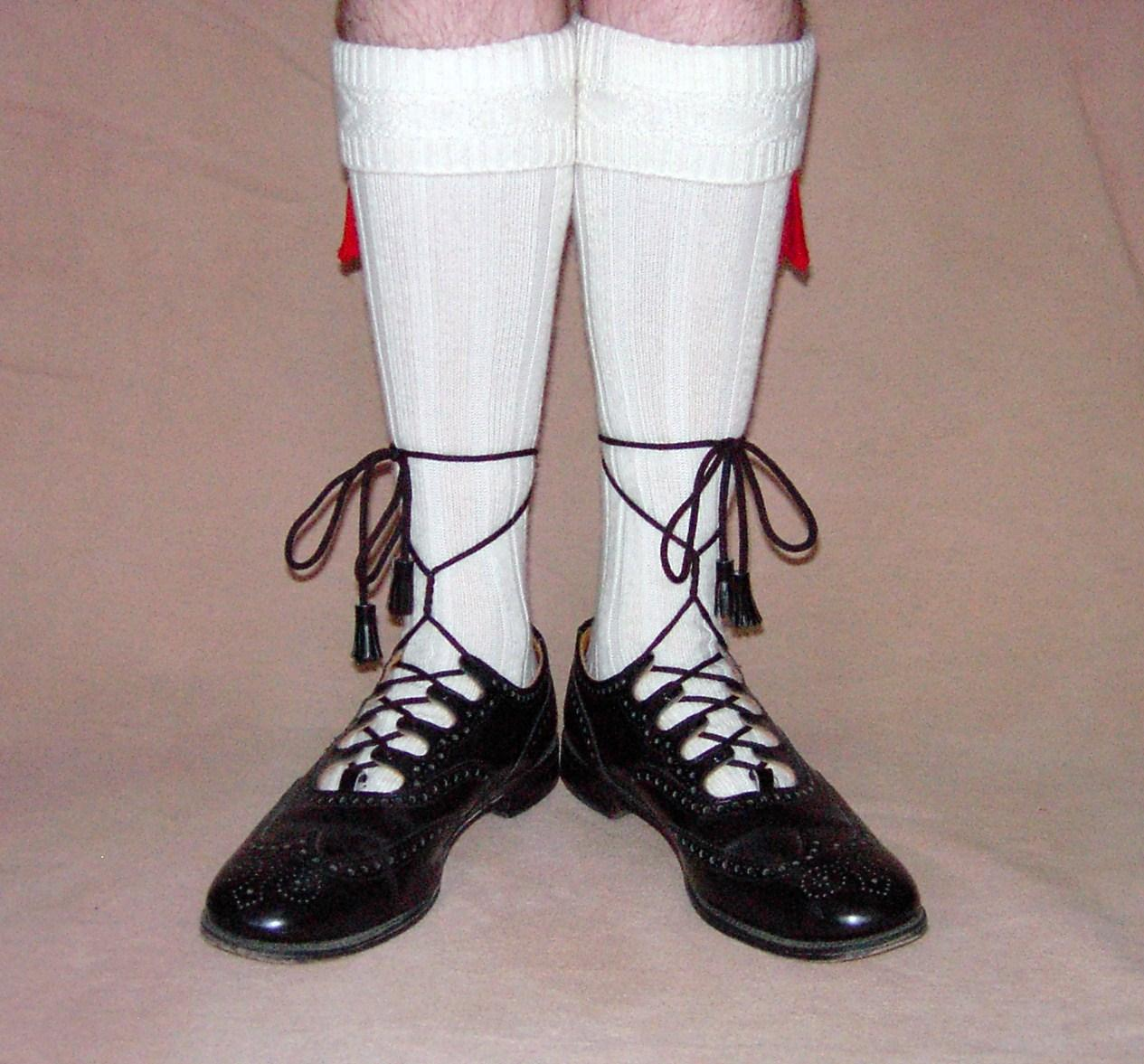
Ghillie brogues

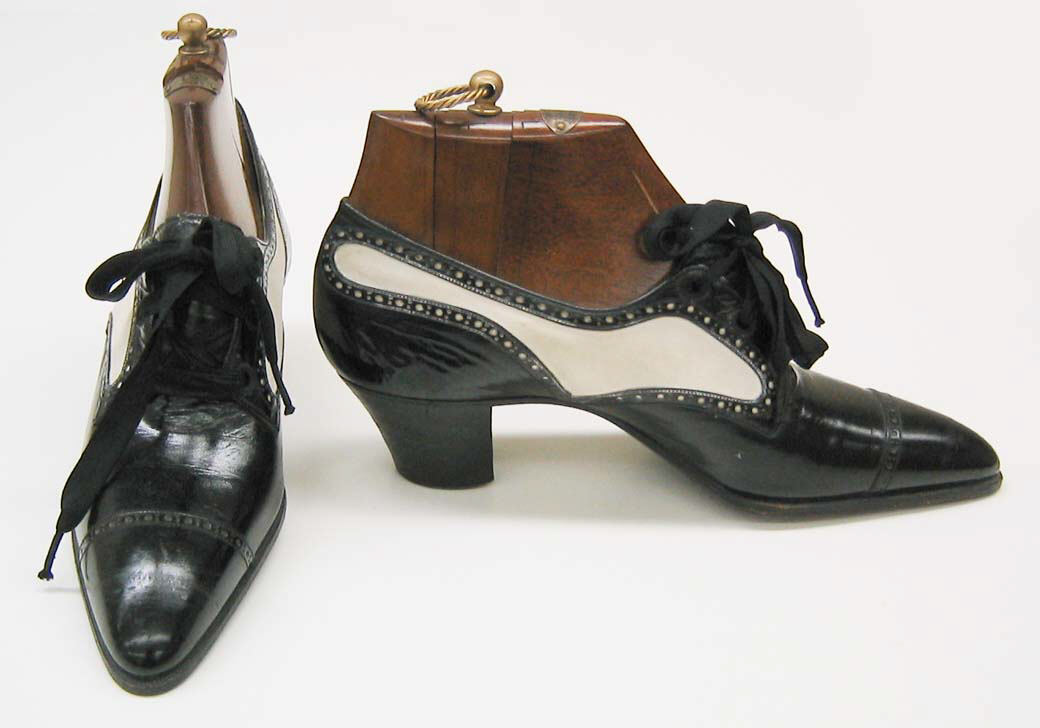
Women's high heel brogues

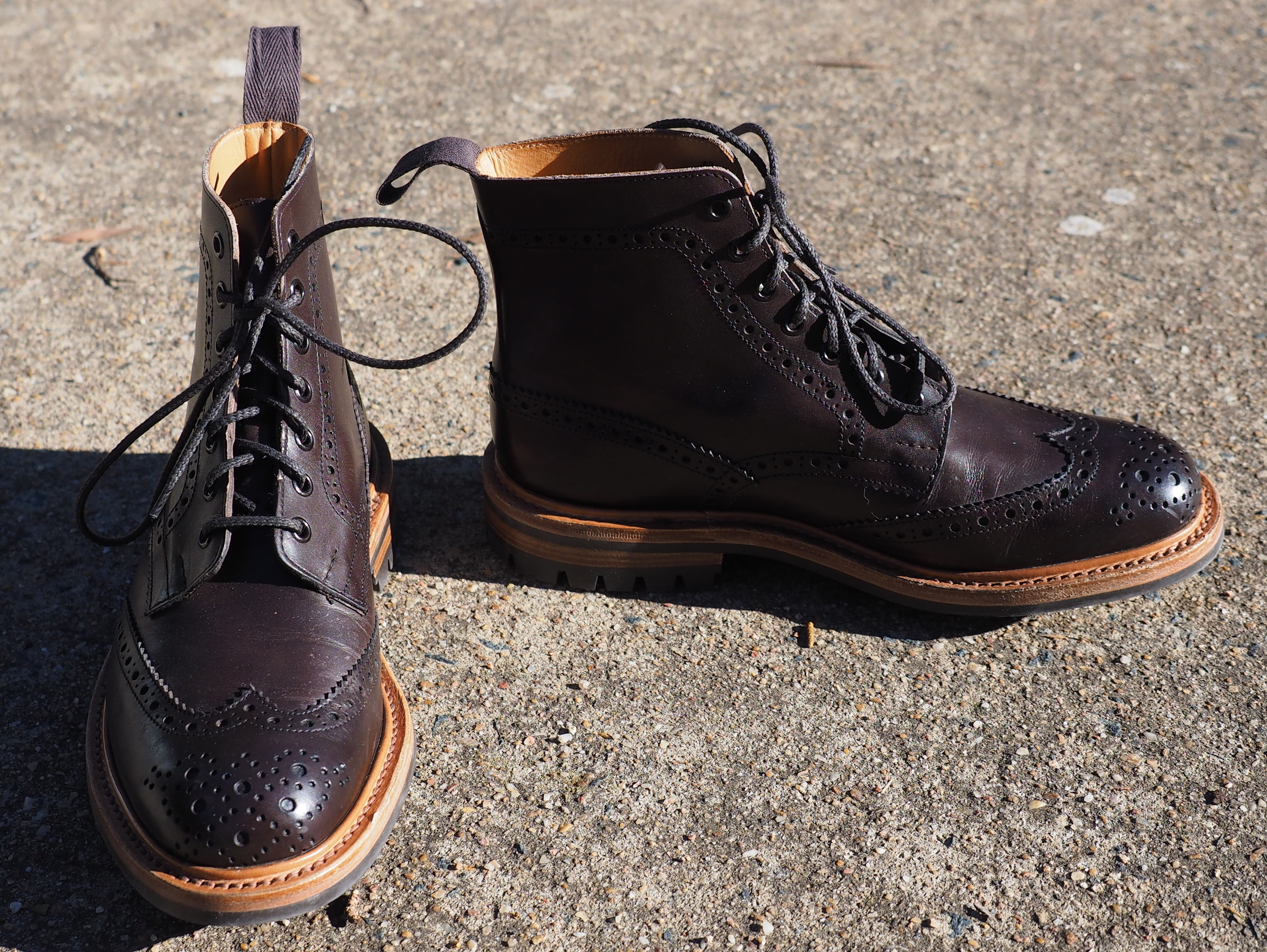
Brogued boots

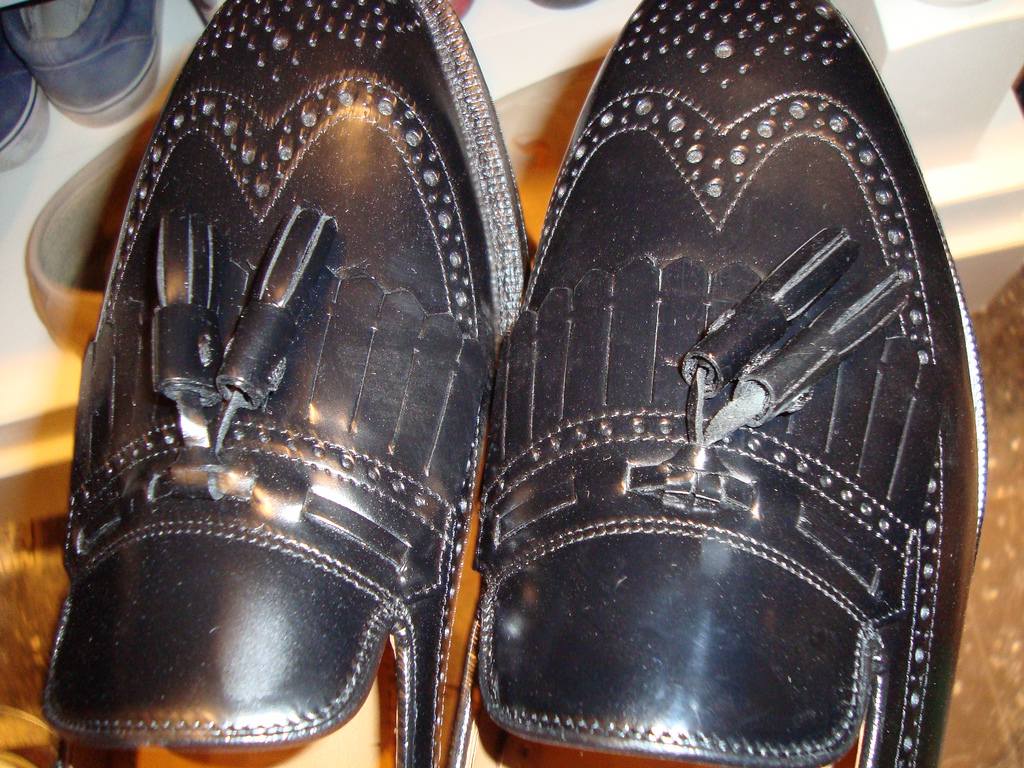
Blind brogue loafers

== See also ==
- List of shoe styles
