= Oxford shoe =

Type of shoe

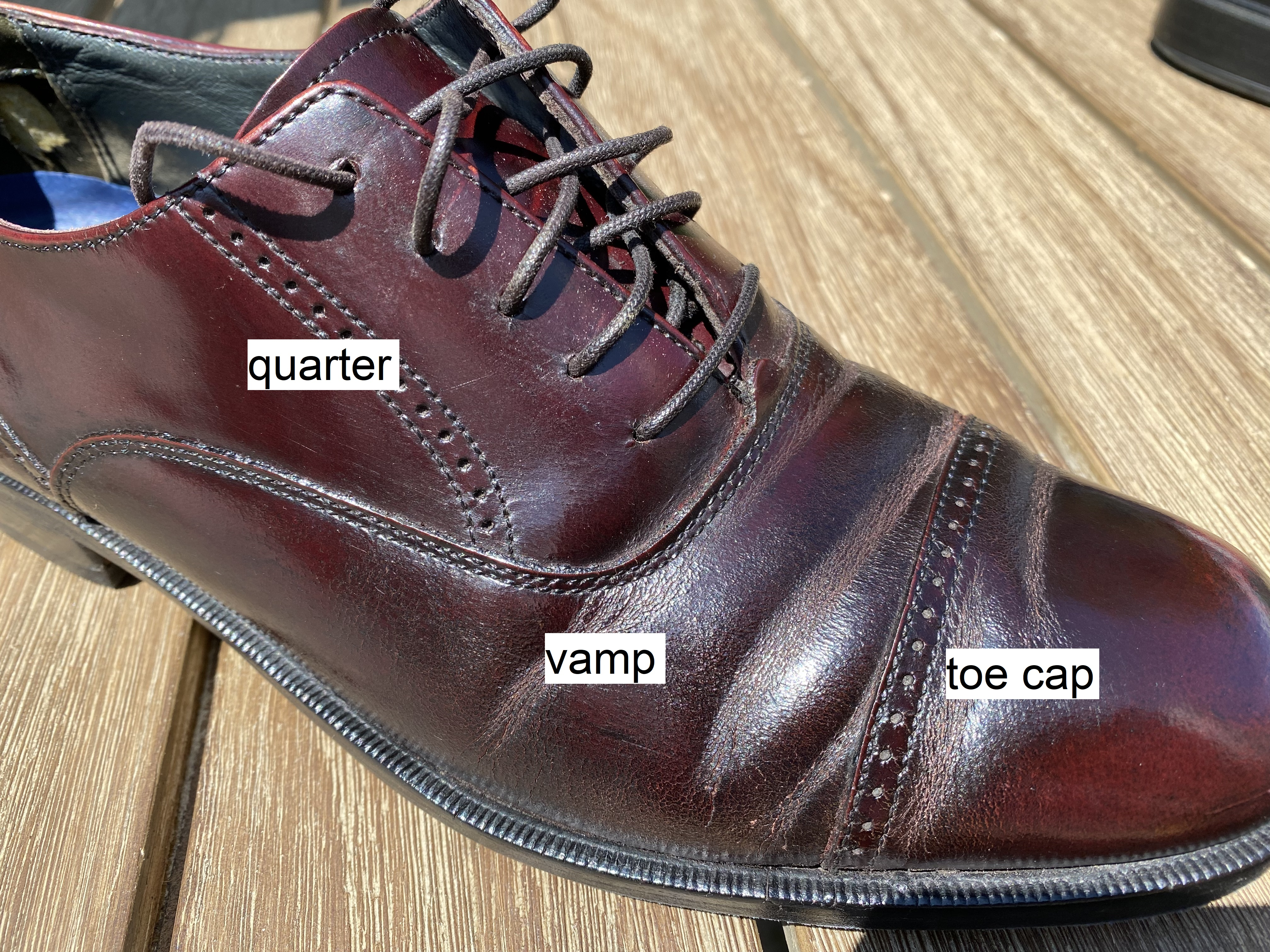
Men's cap-toe Oxford shoe, with parts labelled

An Oxford shoe is a type of lace-up shoe characterized by having eyestays (or facings, which contain the shoelace eyelets), attached under the vamp, a feature termed "closed lacing". An Oxford shoe with a common quarter-vamp section joined to the eyestays by a single horizontal seam is sometimes called a Balmoral shoe, particularly in the U.K. This contrasts with derbies and bluchers, which have "open lacing," or eyestays attached atop the vamp. Originally, Oxfords were plain, formal shoes, made of leather, but they evolved into a range of styles suitable for formal, uniform, or casual wear. On the basis of function and the dictates of fashion, Oxfords are now made from a variety of materials, including calf leather, faux and genuine patent leather, suede, and canvas. They are normally black or brown, and may be plain or patterned (brogue).

== Terminology ==
The meaning of "Oxford" and "Balmoral" varies geographically. In the United States, the Balmoral shoe is often synonymous with the Oxford, and Oxford sometimes denotes any rather formal lace-up shoe, including the blucher and derby. In Britain and other countries, the Balmoral is an Oxford with no seams attaching quarter to vamp, but a horizontal seam above meeting the eyestays and another one below meeting the welt, and often a seamed toe cap as well; when the shoe's upper horizontal seam adjoins a tall, laced shaft, the result is a Balmoral boot, a common style.

Oxford shoes vary in style. The cap-toe Oxford is the most well-known, but there are also whole-cut, plain-toe, and brogue-styled Oxfords. The whole-cut Oxford's upper is made from a single piece of leather with only a single seam at the back, or rarely no seams at all. Shoes with closed lacing (Oxfords/Balmorals) are considered more formal than those with open lacing (bluchers/derbies).

== History ==
The origin of the Oxford shoe is unclear. Two origins have been suggested. First that Oxford shoes originated from students at Oxford University who wore knee-high boots that were trimmed down to create medium-sized boots, given the name Oxoniana Oxfords. A second suggestion is that they were popularised by Prince Albert who resided in Balmoral Castle and so are named after his home. This shoe style did not appear in North America until the 1800s.

Oxfords were derived from the Oxonian, a half-boot with side slits that gained popularity at Oxford University in 1800. Unlike early shoes, Oxfords were cut smaller than the foot. The side slit evolved into a side lace that eventually moved to the instep, as students rebelled against knee-high and ankle-high boots. The toe cap can either be lined with two narrow rows of stitching, perforated holes along the end cap stitching (quarter-brogue), perforated holes along the end cap stitching and on the toe cap (semi-brogue), or a semi-brogue with the classical wingtip design (full-brogue).

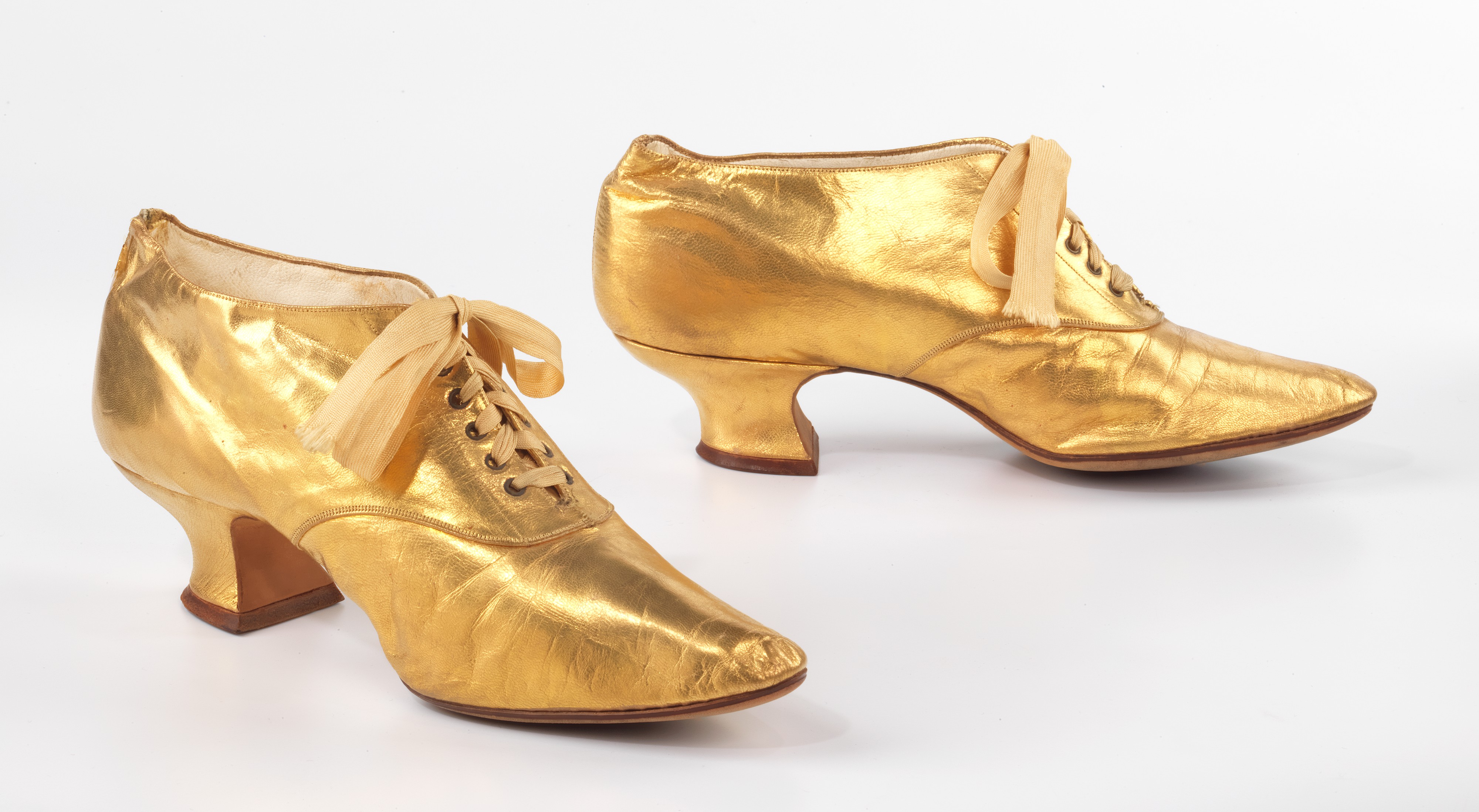
Evening Oxford shoes created by Alfred J. Cammeyer in 1891

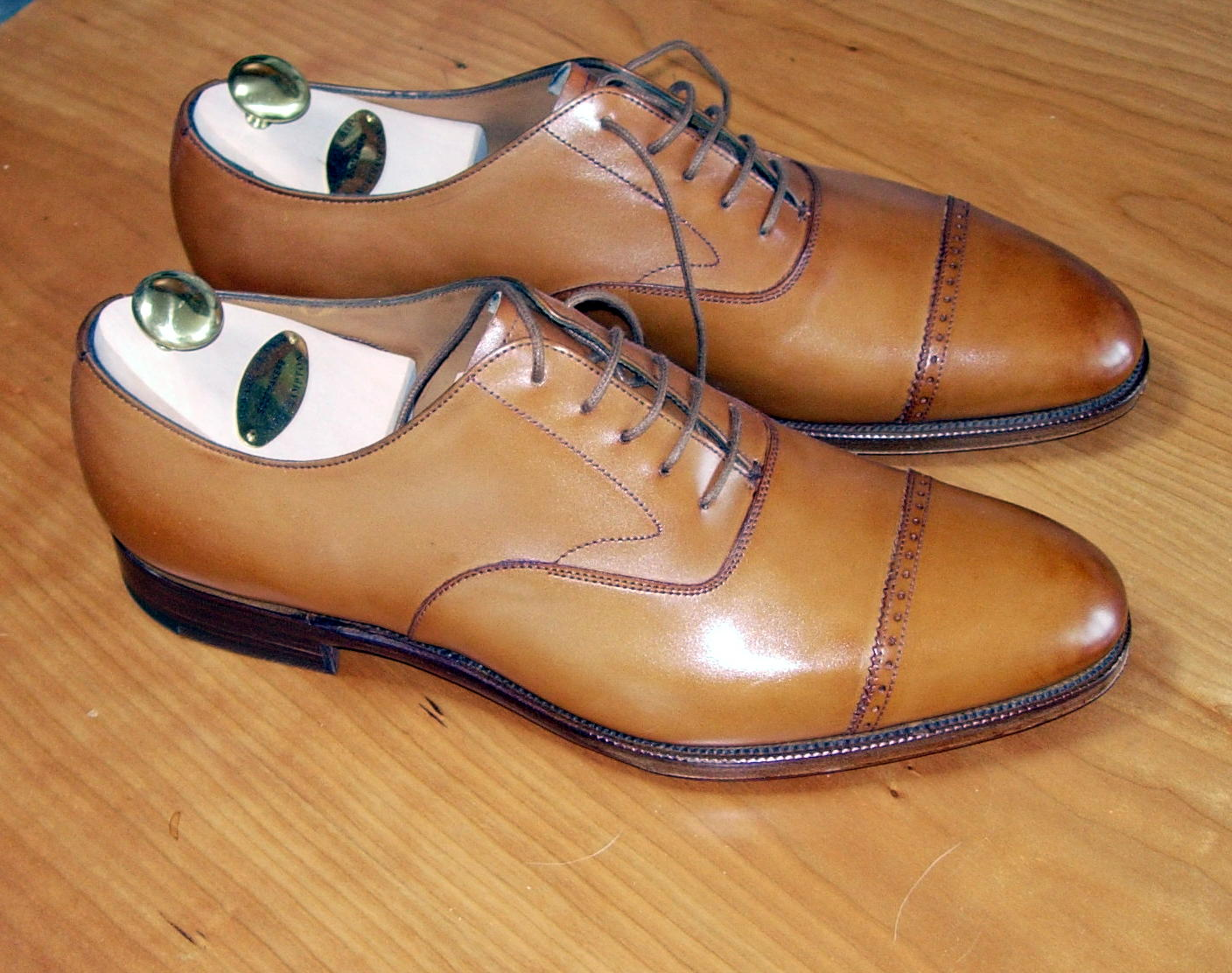
Men's quarter brogue oxford shoes

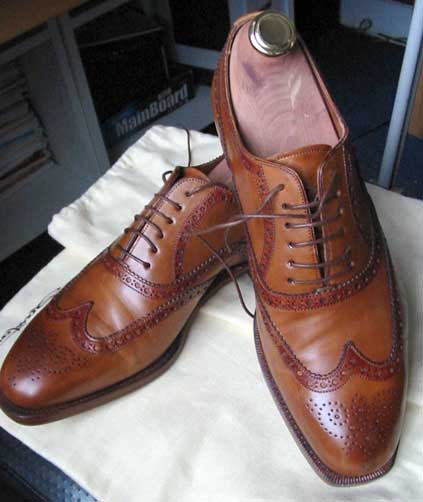
Men's full brogue (or wingtip) oxford

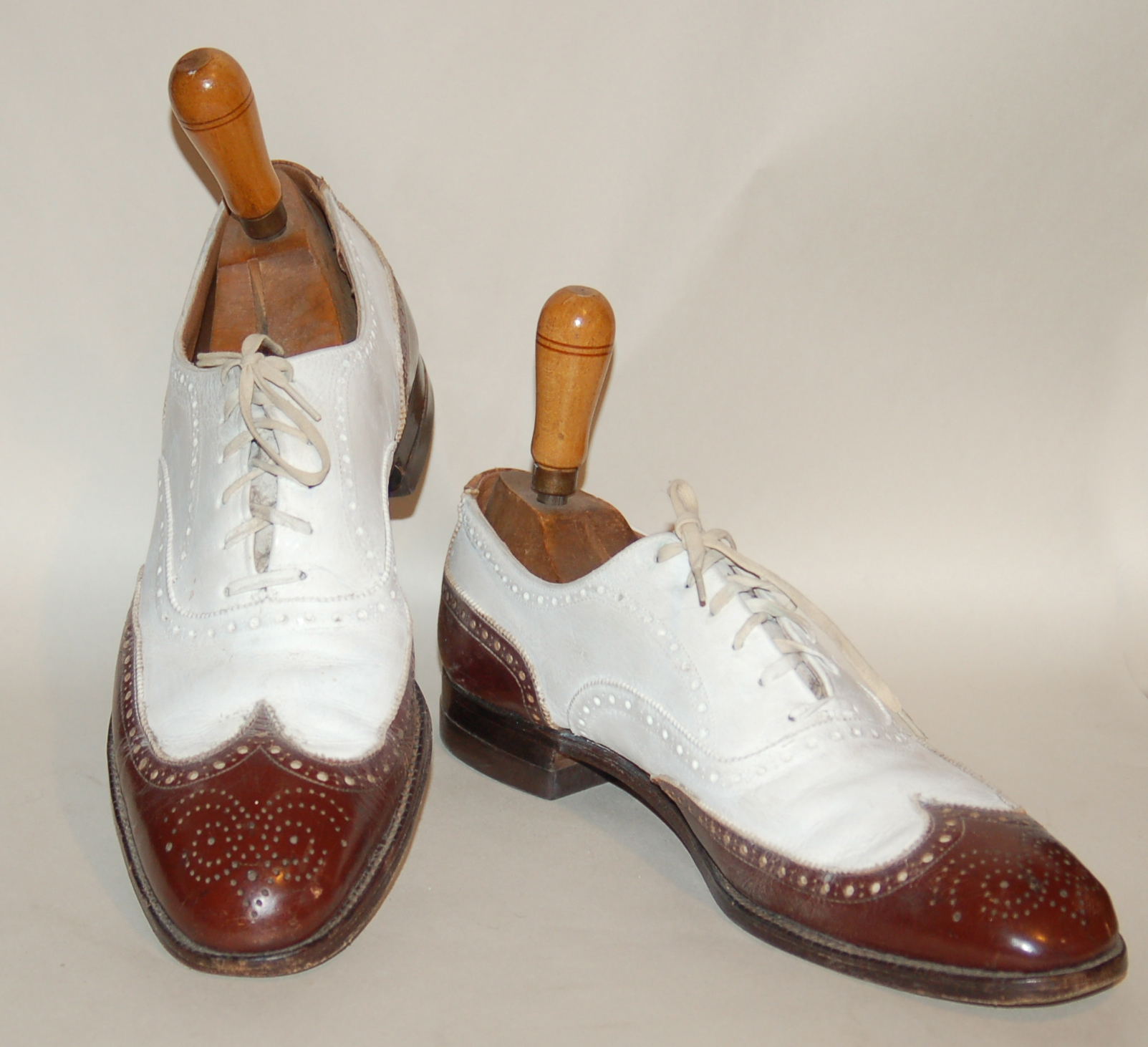
Oxford full brogue spectator shoes

== See also ==
- List of shoe styles
- Blucher shoe
- Brogue shoe
- Derby shoe
- Saddle shoe
- "The Short Happy Life of the Brown Oxford"
- Spectator shoe
- Wholecut
