= Derby shoe =

Type of shoe

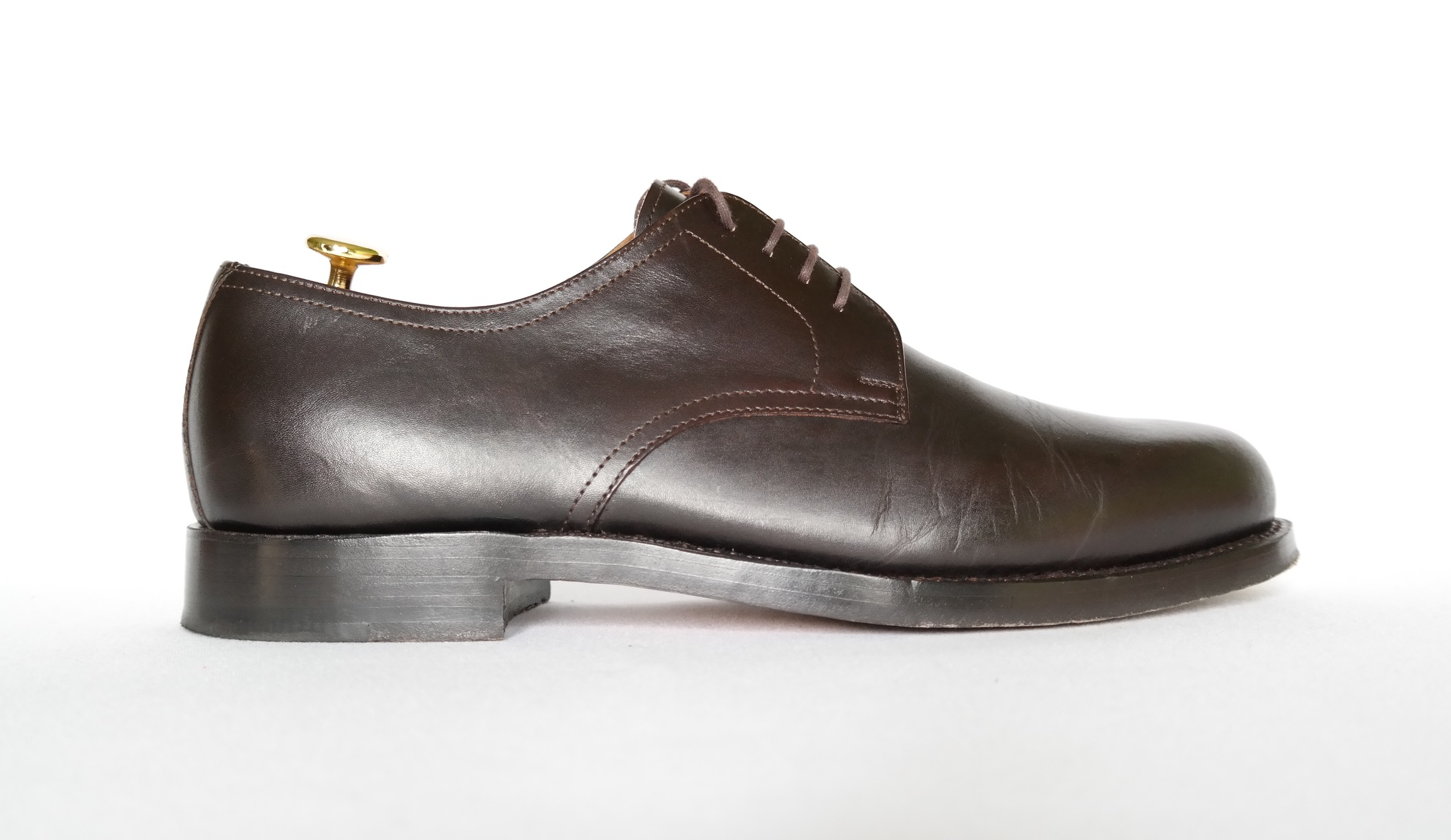
A plain Derby shoe

A derby (UK: /ˈdɑːrbi/ DAR-bee, US: /ˈdɜːrbi/ DUR-bee; also called gibson) is a style of shoe or boot characterized by large quarters with attached eyestays (or facings, which hold the shoelace eyelets) that are sewn on top of the vamp. This construction method, also known as "open lacing," contrasts with that of the Oxford shoe's "closed lacing." In American English, the derby shoe may also be called a "blucher," although technically the blucher has its quarter and vamp in one piece.

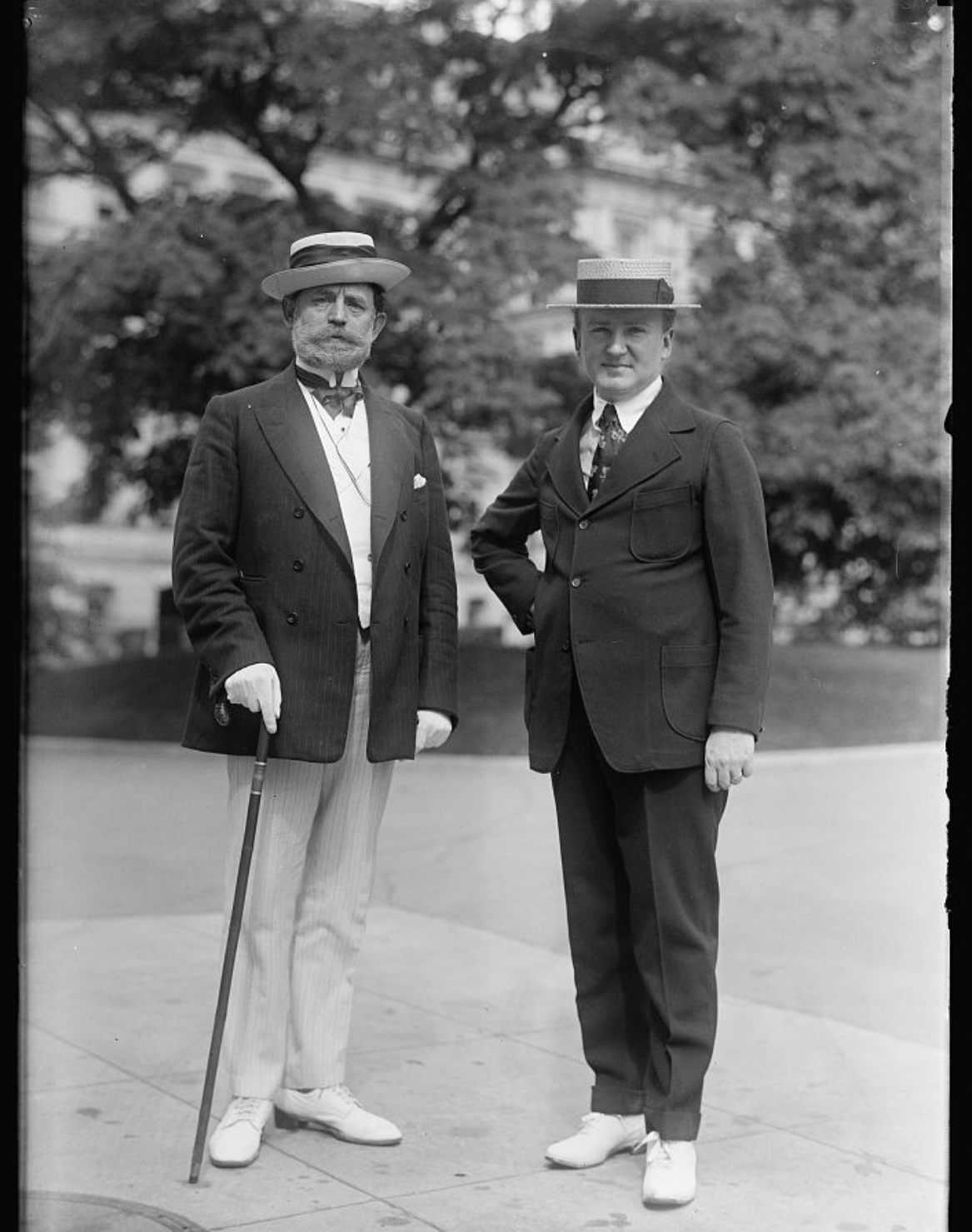
Senator J. Hamilton Lewis and attorney Joseph P. Tumulty pictured wearing "white bucks", 1917

In modern colloquial English the derby shoe may be referred to as 'bucks' when the upper is made of buckskin. "White bucks", or light-colored suede or buckskin (or nubuck) derby shoes, usually with a red sole, were long popular among the students and graduates of Ivy League colleges. By translation, these shoes also became associated with elite law firms in cities of the Eastern United States, especially New York and Boston, giving rise to the name "white-shoe firm" to describe these prestigious legal institutions.

The derby became a popular sporting and hunting boot in the 1850s. By the turn of the 20th century, it had become appropriate for wear in town.

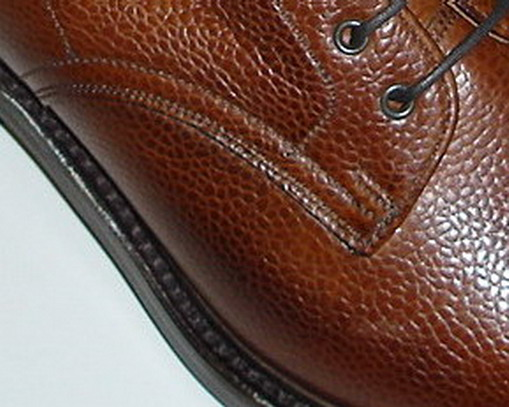
Detail of a man's derby-style dress shoe showing lacing eyelet tabs sewn on top of the vamp

== See also ==
- List of shoe styles
