= Polo coat =

Kind of overcoat

A polo coat, also known as a camel coat, is a men's overcoat associated with polo players in England. Camelhair was the fabric at first, but later camelhair and wool blends became standard due to its higher durability. The terms polo coat and camel coat are thus synonymous.

== See also ==
- Polo cloth
- Chesterfield coat
- Covert coat
- Paletot
- Duffle coat
- Pea coat
- Trench coat
