= Pea coat =

Outer coat originally worn by sailors

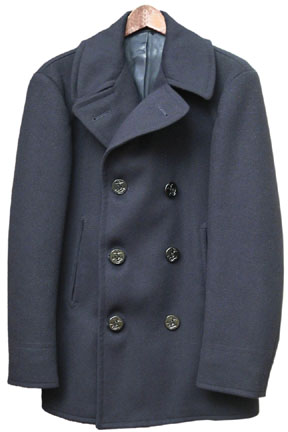
Military surplus coat, produced for the U.S. Navy

A pea coat is an outer coat, generally of a navy-coloured heavy wool, originally worn by sailors of European and later American navies. Pea coats are characterized by short length, broad lapels, double-breasted fronts, often large wooden, metal or plastic buttons, three or four in two rows, and vertical or slash pockets. References to the pea jacket appear in American newspapers at least as early as the 1720s, and modern renditions still maintain the original design and composition.

A reefer jacket is an officer's or chief petty officer's pea coat, with the same design but bearing gold buttons and epaulettes. A bridge coat is a reefer jacket which extends to the thighs, giving greater protection to an officer who does not need agility to climb the rigging.

== Terminology ==
It may also be called a peacoat, pea jacket, or pilot jacket.

== Etymology ==
According to a 1975 edition of The Mariner's Mirror, the term "pea coat" originated from the Dutch or West Frisian word pijjekker or pijjakker, in which pij referred to the type of cloth used, a coarse kind of twilled blue cloth with a nap on one side. Jakker designates a man's short, heavy coat.

Another theory, favoured by the US Navy, states that the heavy topcoat worn in cold, miserable weather by seafaring men was once tailored from pilot cloth — a heavy, coarse, stout kind of twilled blue cloth with the nap on one side. This was sometimes called P-cloth from the initial letter of "pilot", and the garment made from it was called a P-jacket — later a pea coat. The term has been used since 1723 to denote coats made from that cloth.

The English word "pea-jacket" dates from at least 1717.

== Characteristics ==
Today, the style is considered a classic, and pea coats are worn by all manner of individuals. The style has evolved to the addition of hoods.

While some of the jackets seen on the street are genuine navy surplus, most are designs inspired by the classic uniform and available from retailers with design variations that reflect current fashion trends, including a variety of fabrics and colours. The standard US Navy-issued pea coat used since 1897 has navy-blue wool and sports buttons (brass for officers, black plastic for enlisted) decorated with an anchor motif. The standard fabric for historical pea coats in the twentieth century was a smooth and heavy, dark navy blue Kersey wool, which was dense enough to repel wind and rain, and able to contain body heat without further insulation. This wool was left lightly treated after being sheared to retain much of the natural lanolin oil from sheep, thus increasing its water-repelling and insulating properties. Kersey was gradually replaced in the U.S. Navy through the 1970s by the rougher black Melton cloth (also lightly treated), a lighter wool that requires a quilted lining to match the warmth of the original Kersey. The peacoat goes out of US Navy issue by 2027.

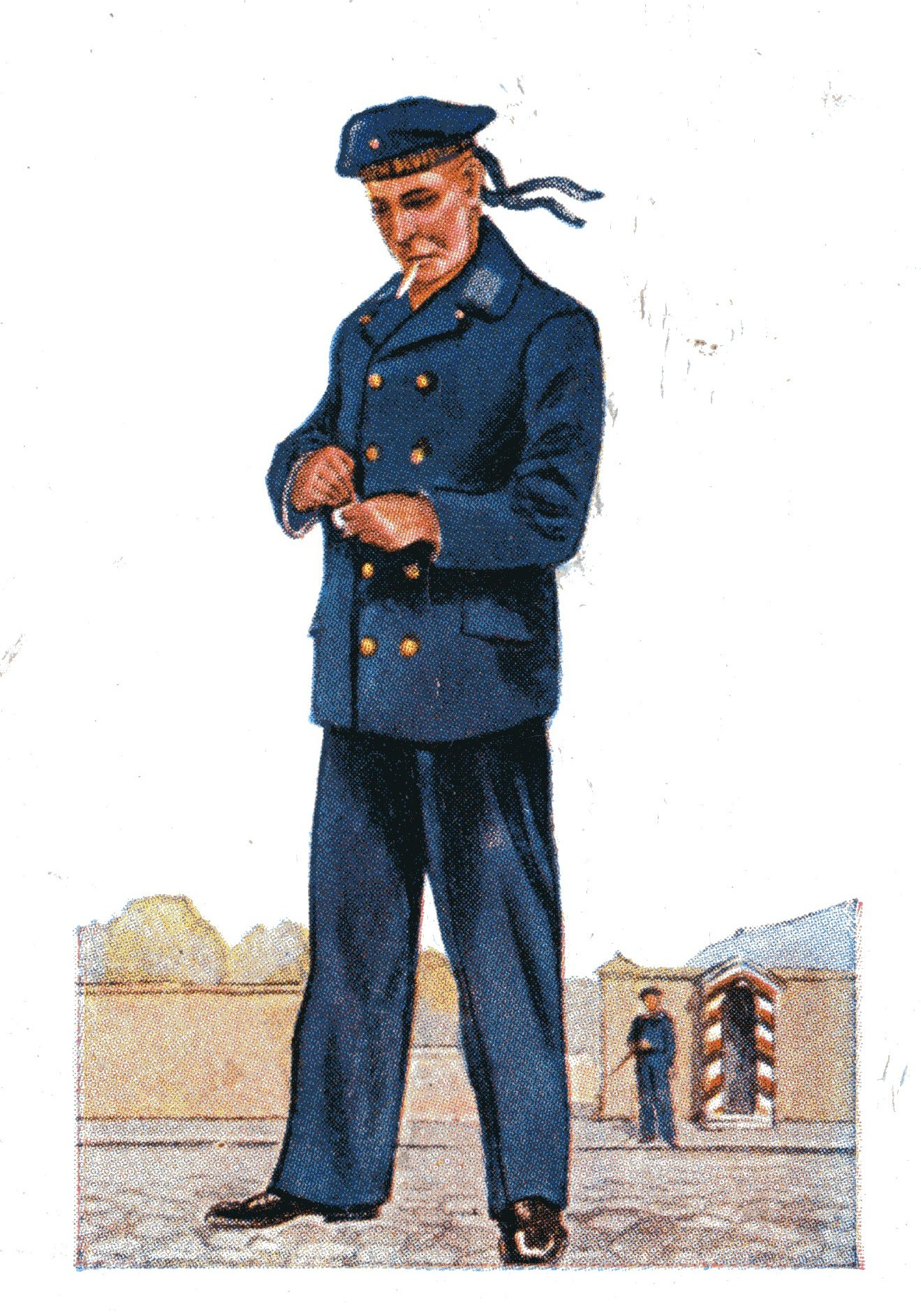
Navy Pea Coat illustrated ca. 1910

== See also ==
- Chesterfield coat
- Covert coat
- Duffel coat
- Greatcoat
- Paletot
- Polo coat
- Trench coat
