= Coat =

Warming outerwear garment for men and women

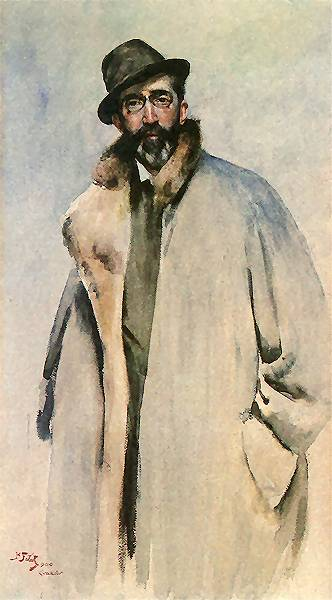
Man wearing a coat, painting by Julian Fałat, 1900

A coat is an outer garment for the upper body, worn by a person of any gender for warmth or fashion. Coats typically have long sleeves and are open down the front, and closing by means of buttons, zippers, hook-and-loop fasteners (AKA velcro), toggles, a belt, or a combination of some of these. Other possible features include collars, shoulder straps, and hoods.

== Etymology ==
Coat is one of the earliest clothing category words in English, attested as far back as the early Middle Ages. (See also Clothing terminology.) The Oxford English Dictionary traces coat in its modern meaning to c. 1300, when it was written cote or cotte. The word coat stems from Old French and then Latin cottus. It originates from the Proto-Indo-European word for woolen clothes.

An early use of coat in English is coat of mail (chainmail), a tunic-like garment of metal rings, usually knee- or mid-calf length.

== History ==
The origins of the Western-style coat may be traced to the sleeved, close-fitted and front-fastened coats worn by the Scythian nomads of the Eurasian Steppe, though this style of coat may be much older, having been found with four-thousand-year-old Tarim mummies and in five-thousand-year-old mummy of Ötzi The medieval and renaissance coat (generally spelled cote or cotte by costume historians) is a mid-length, sleeved outer garment worn by both men and women, fitted to the waist and buttoned up the front, with a full skirt in its essentials, not unlike the modern coat.

By the eighteenth century, overcoats had begun to supplant capes and cloaks as outerwear in Western fashion. Before the Industrial Revolution, which began in the second half of the eighteenth century, the extremely high cost of cloth meant certain styles of clothing represented wealth and rank, but as cloth became more affordable post-industrialization, people within a lower social class could adopt the fashionable outdoor wear of the wealthy elite, which included coats. In the nineteenth century, the invention of the sewing machine paired with existing textile machinery increased the affordability of mass-produced, ready-to-wear clothing and helped spur the popularity of wearing coats and jackets. By the mid-twentieth century the terms jacket and coat became confused for recent styles; the difference in use is still maintained for older garments.

== Coats, jackets and overcoats ==
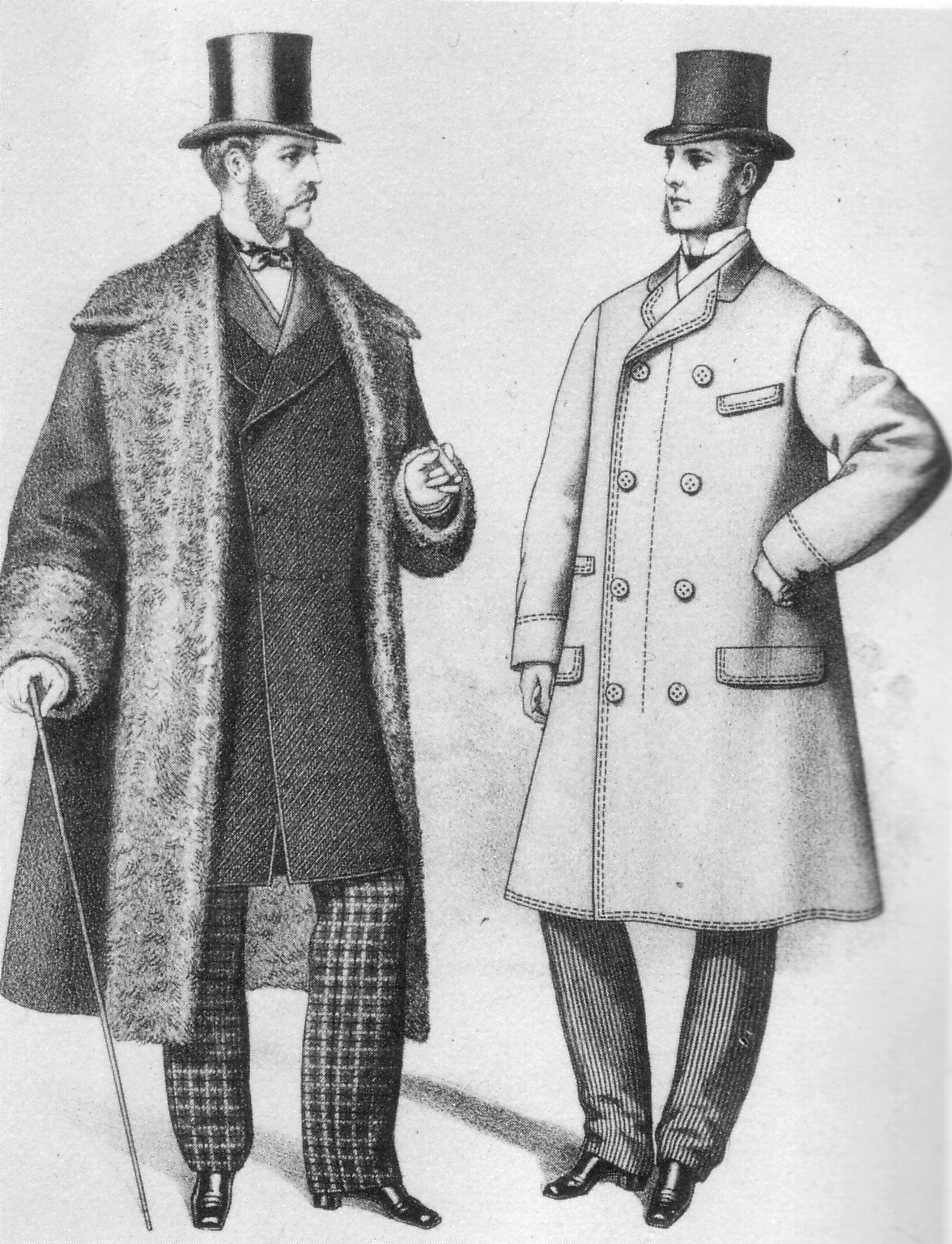
Overcoat (left) and topcoat (right) from The Gazette of Fashion, 1872

In the early nineteenth century, Western-style coats were divided into under-coats and overcoats. The term "under-coat" is now archaic but denoted the fact that the word coat could be both the outermost layer for outdoor wear (overcoat) or the coat that is worn under that (under-coat). However, the term coat has begun to denote just the overcoat rather than the under-coat. The older usage of the word coat can still be found in the expression "to wear a coat and tie", which does not mean that wearer has on an overcoat. Nor do the terms tailcoat, morning coat or house coat denote types of overcoat. Indeed, an overcoat may be worn over the top of a tailcoat. In tailoring circles, the tailor who makes all types of coats is called a coat maker. Similarly, in American English, the term sports coat is used to denote a type of jacket not worn as outerwear (overcoat) (sports jacket in British English).

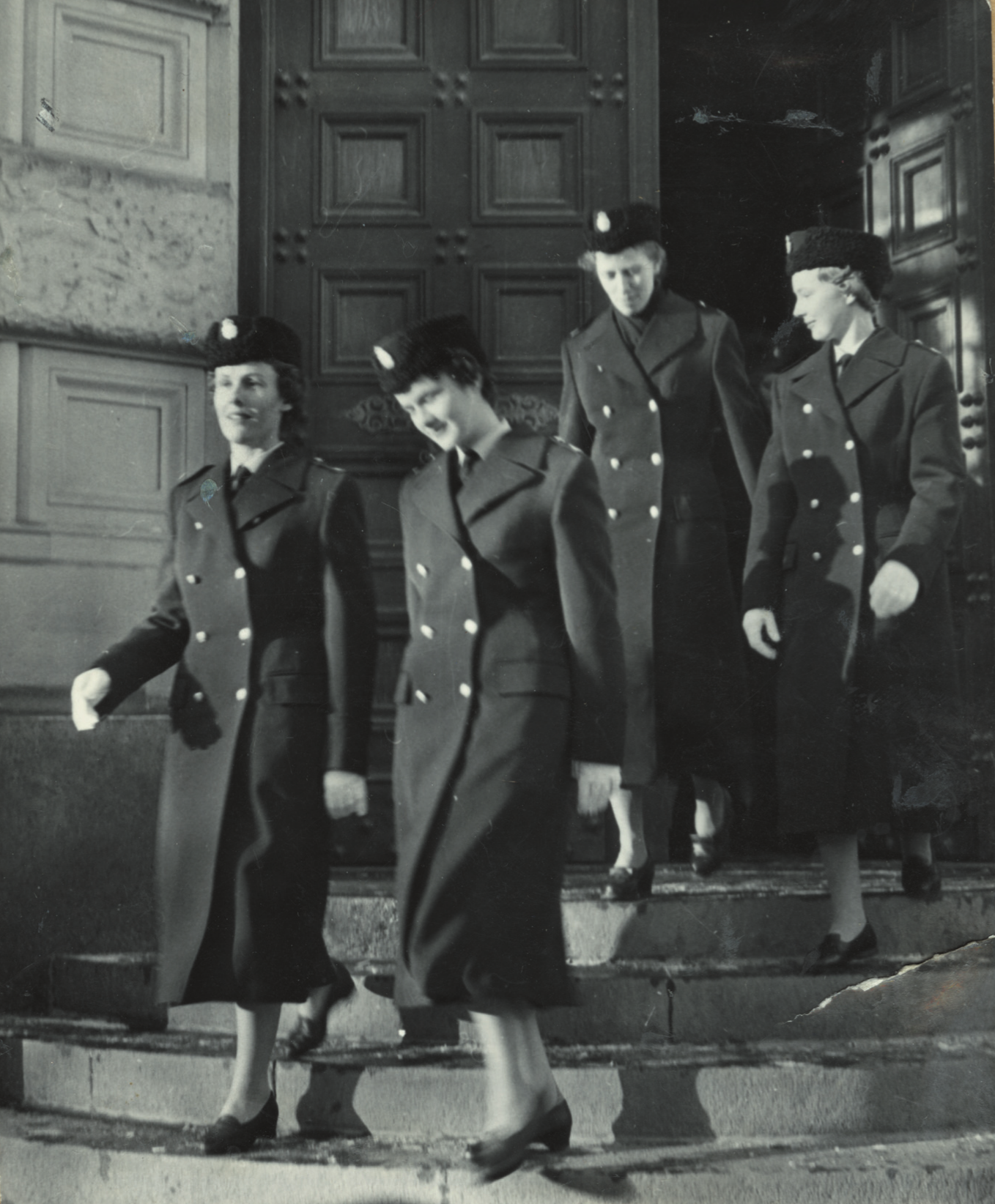
Swedish police women wearing coats as part of their uniform in 1958.

The term jacket is a traditional term usually used to refer to a specific type of short under-coat. Typical modern jackets extend only to the upper thigh in length, whereas older coats such as tailcoats are usually of knee length. The modern jacket worn with a suit is traditionally called a lounge coat (or a lounge jacket) in British English and a sack coat in American English. The American English term is rarely used. Traditionally, the majority of men dressed in a coat and tie, although this has become gradually less widespread since the 1960s. Because the basic pattern for the stroller (black jacket worn with striped trousers in British English) and dinner jacket (tuxedo in American English) are the same as lounge coats, tailors traditionally call both of these special types of jackets a coat.

An overcoat is designed to be worn as the outermost garment worn as outdoor wear; while this use is still maintained in some places, particularly in Britain, elsewhere the term coat is commonly used mainly to denote only the overcoat, and not the under-coat. A topcoat is a slightly shorter overcoat, if any distinction is to be made. Overcoats worn over the top of knee length coats (under-coats) such as frock coats, dress coats, and morning coats are cut to be a little longer than the under-coat so as to completely cover it, as well as being large enough to accommodate the coat underneath.

The length of an overcoat varies: mid-calf being the most frequently found and the default when current fashion is not concerned with hemlines. Designs vary from knee-length to ankle-length, briefly fashionable in the early 1970s and known (to contrast with the usurped mini) as the "maxi".

Speakers of American English sometimes informally use the words jacket and coat interchangeably.

== Types ==
=== Eighteenth and nineteenth centuries ===
==== Men's ====
Some of these styles are still worn. Note that for this period, only coats of the under-coat variety are listed, and overcoats are excluded.

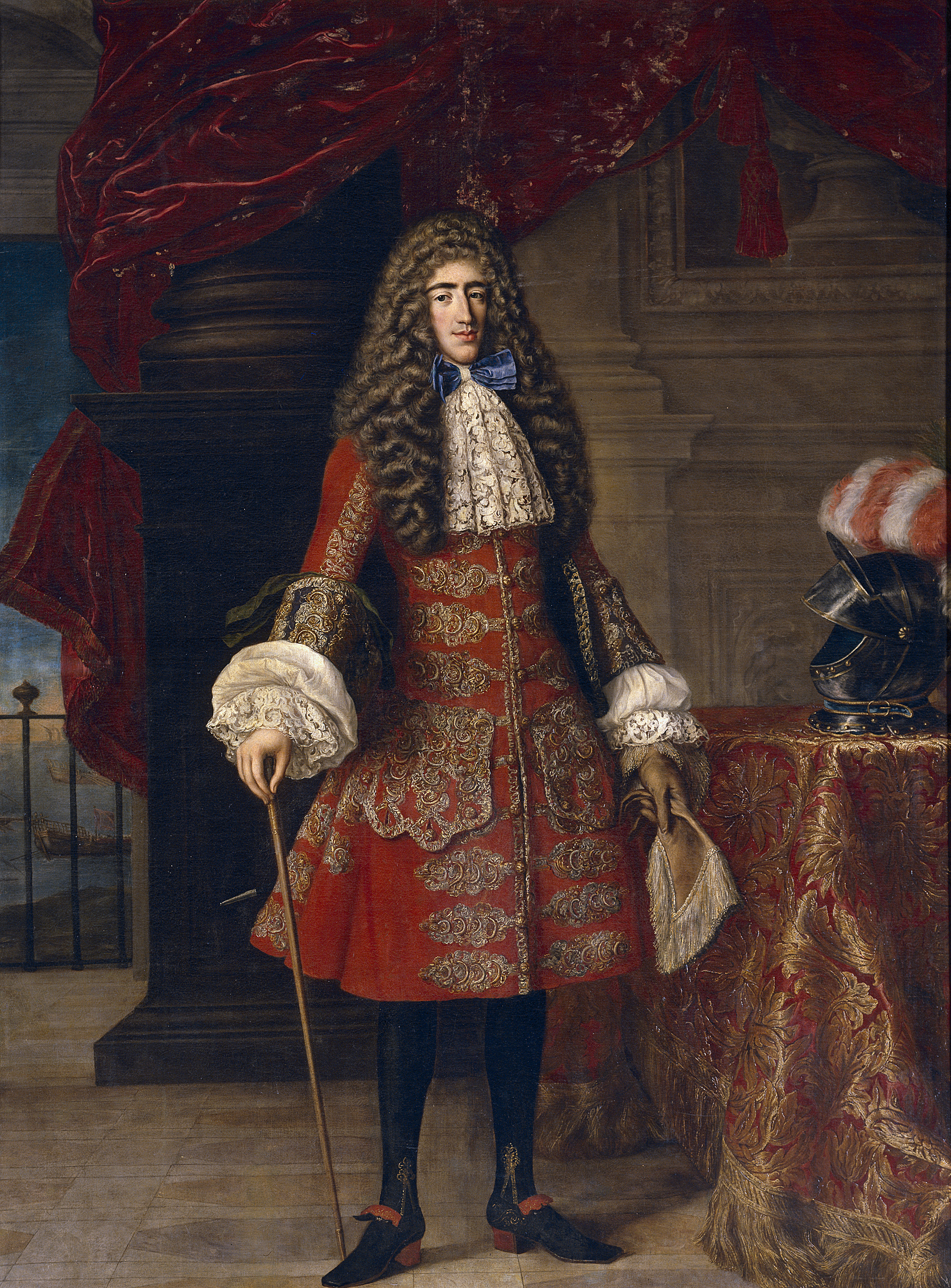
Justacorps, a seventeenth- and eighteenth-century knee-length coat, fitted to the waist with flared skirts

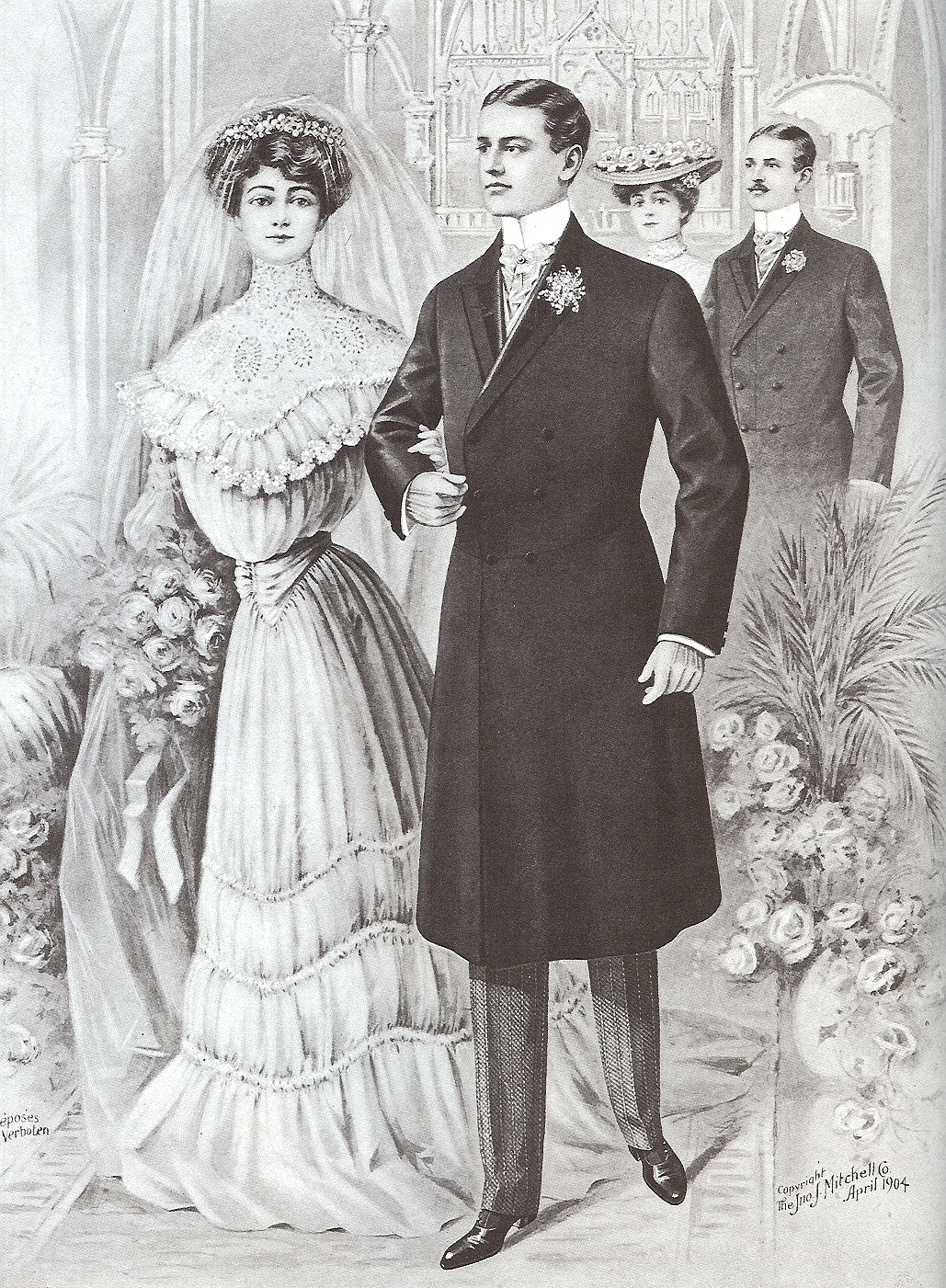
Frock coat, a kneelength men's coat of the nineteenth century

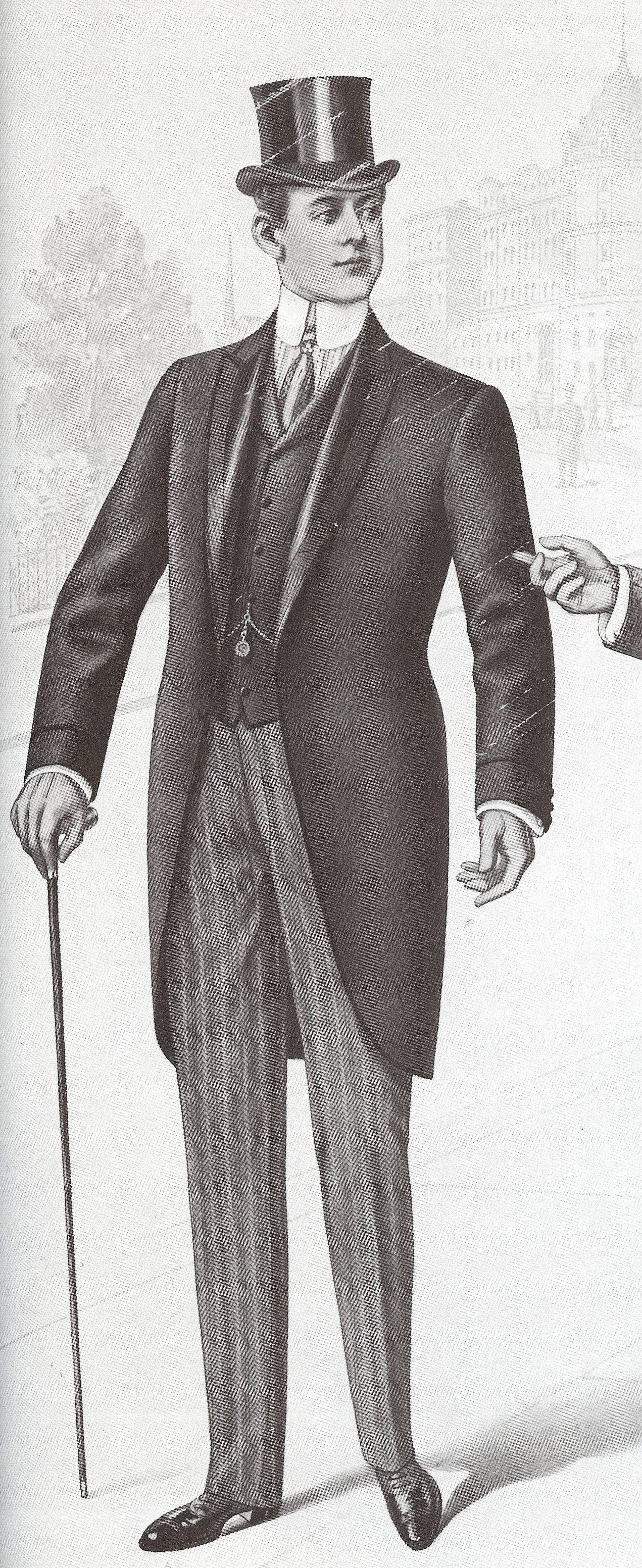
Morning coat or cutaway, a dress coat still worn as formal wear

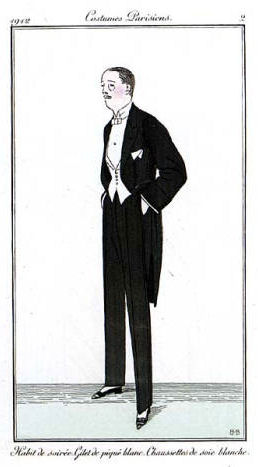
Tailcoat (dress coat in tailor's parlance), a late-eighteenth-century men's coat preserved in today's white tie and tails

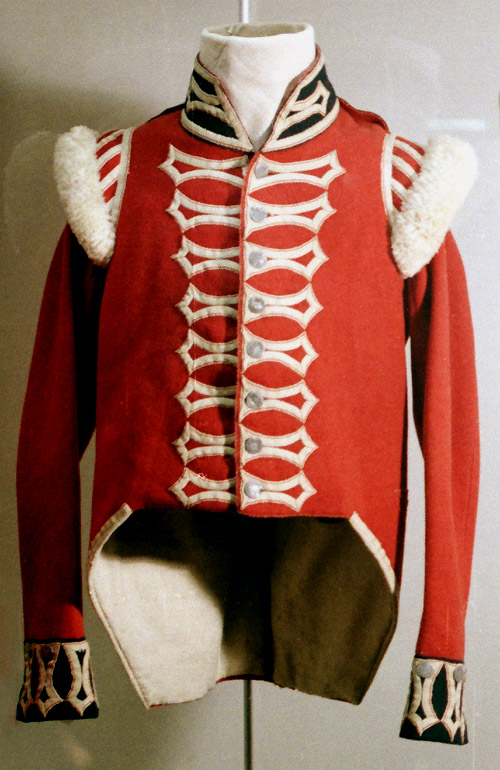
Coatee, an early nineteenth-century military coat, still worn with Highland dress.

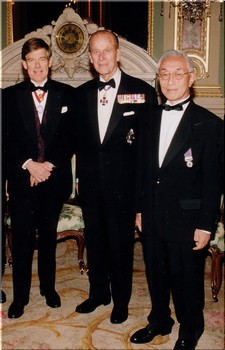
Dinner jacket, a men's semi-formal evening lounge coat.

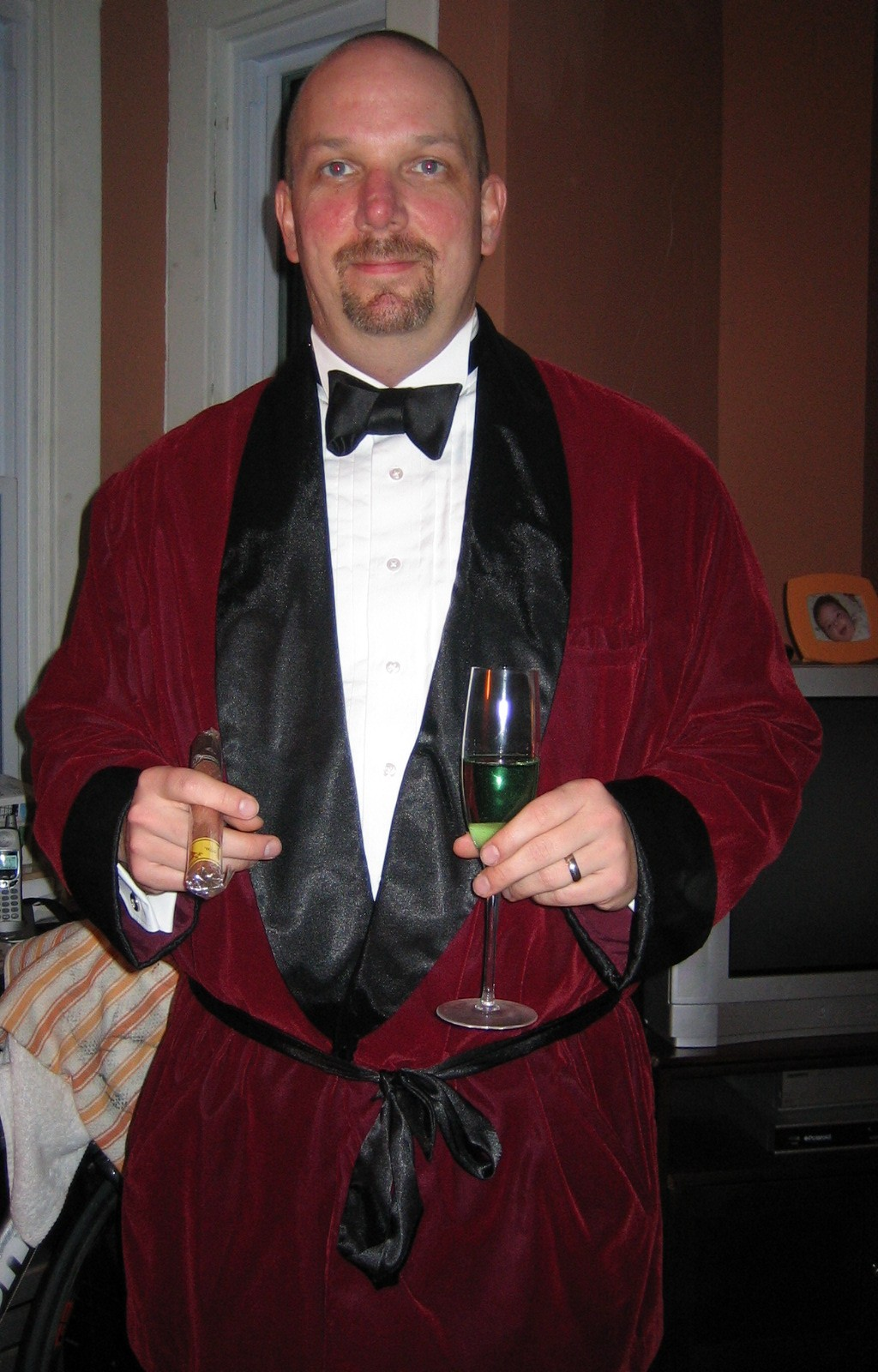
Smoking jacket, a men's jacket worn informally with black tie

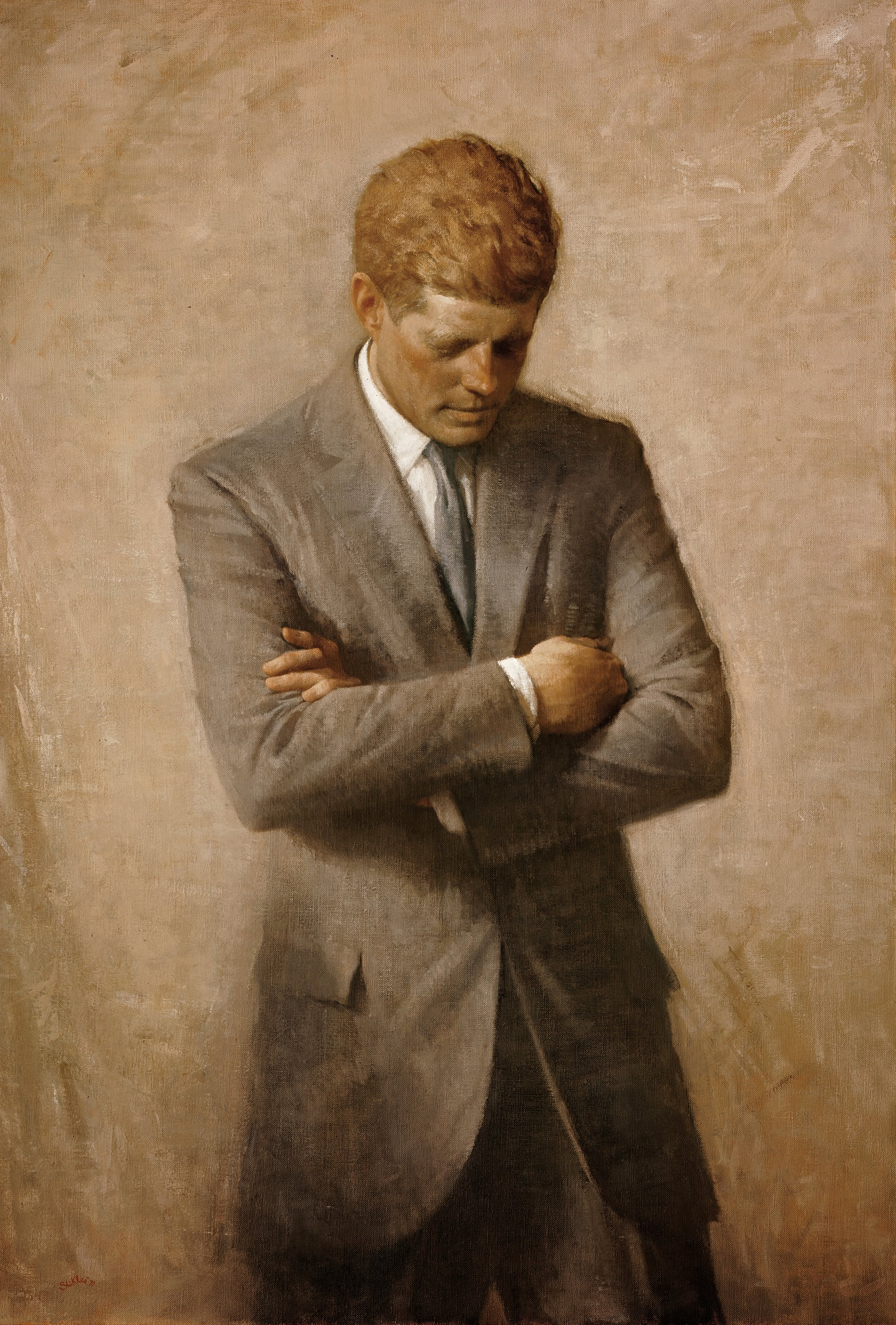
Lounge coat or sack coat, a coat which is also a jacket

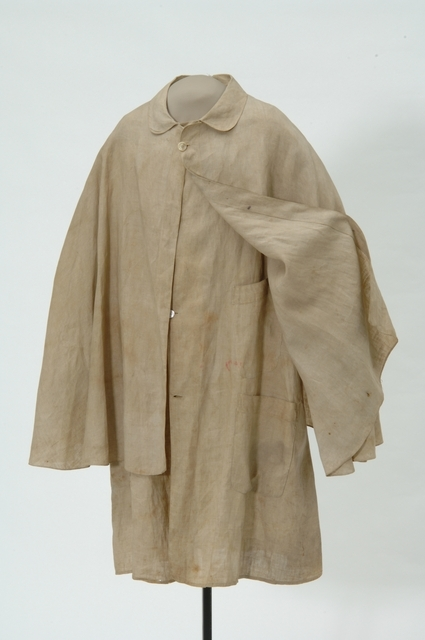
Duster coat or simply "duster" worn when riding horseback

==== Women's ====
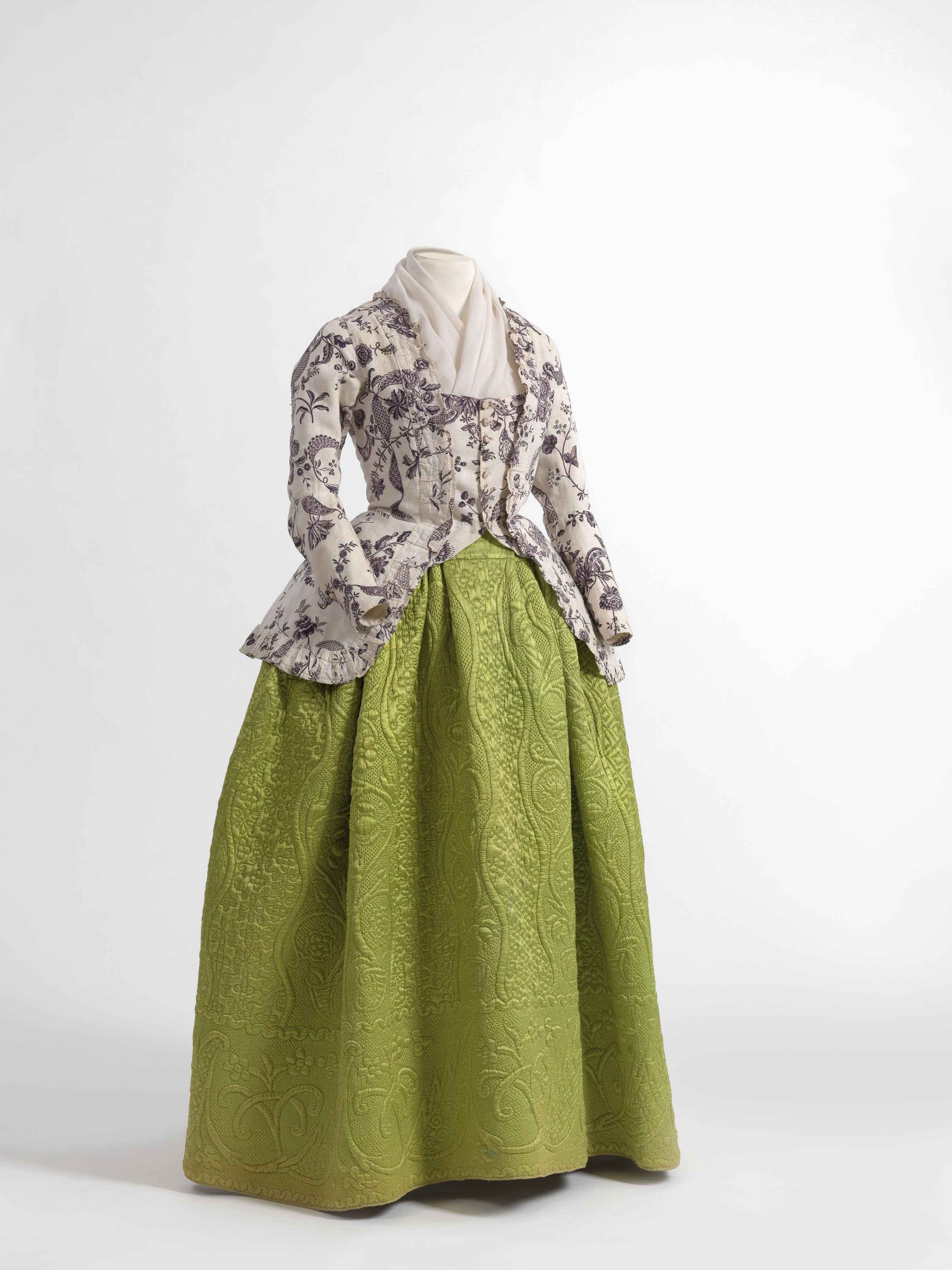
Caraco, an eighteenth- and nineteenth-century fitted coat initially associated with the working class; it is similar to a Bedgown

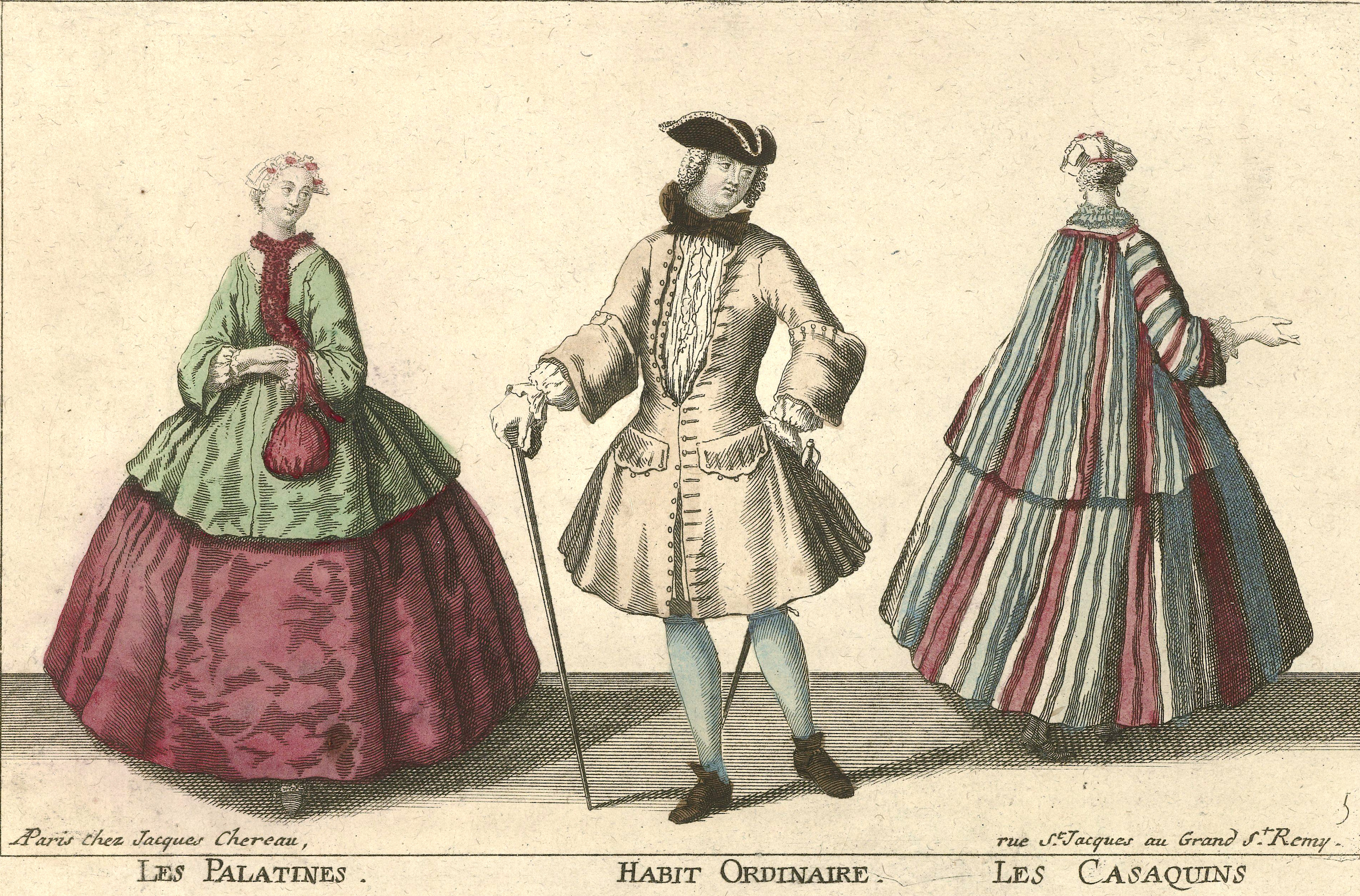
Casaquin, an eighteenth-century coat that fastened down the middle and reached the hip

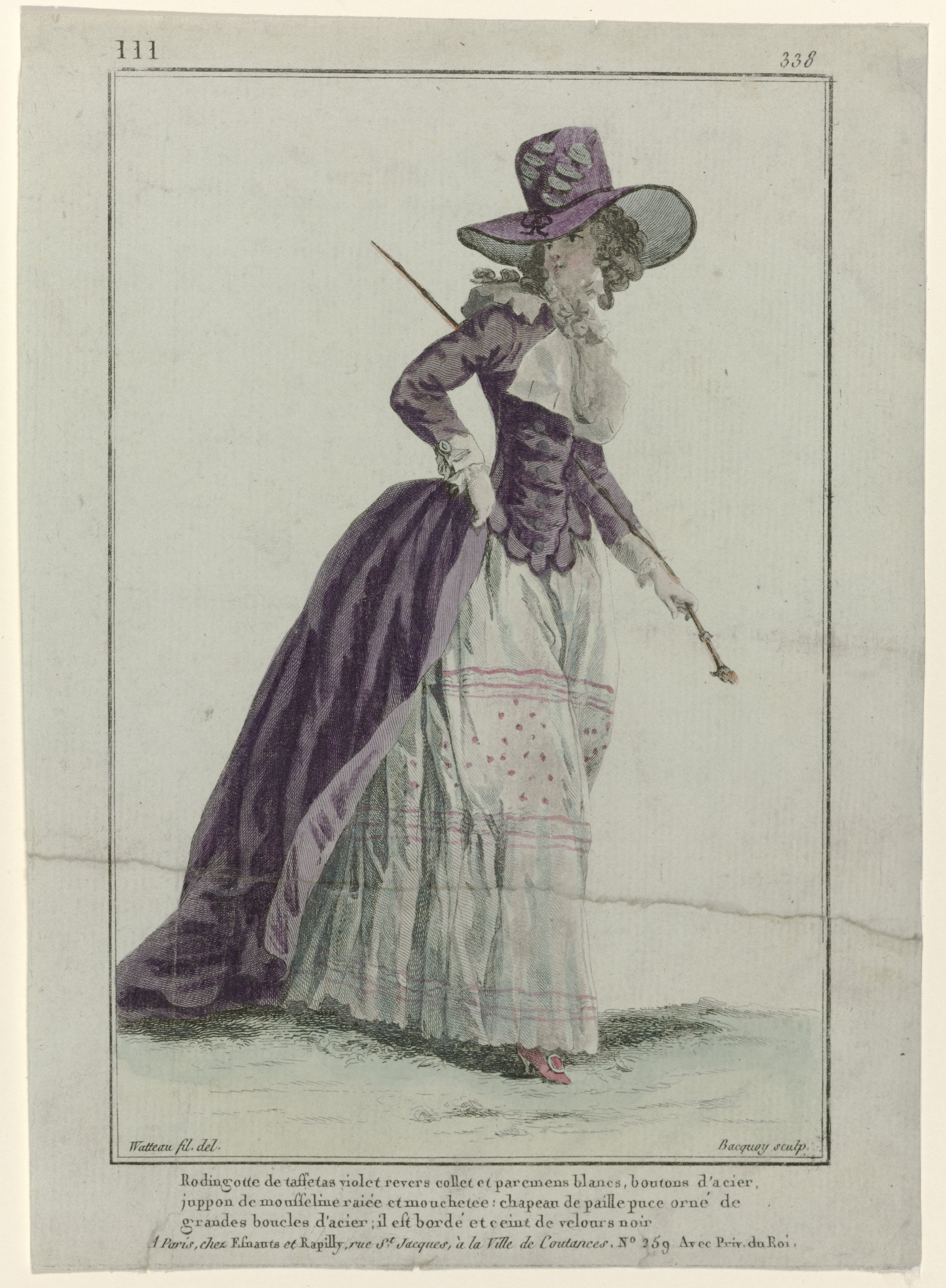
Redingote, an eighteenth-century fitted riding coat with a long skirt down the back worn as a part of a riding habit

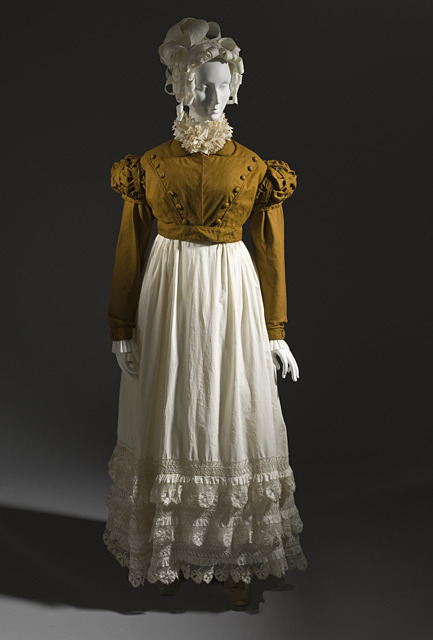
Spencer, a waist-length, frequently double-breasted, coat from the early nineteenth century sometimes made of the same cloth as the gown beneath it

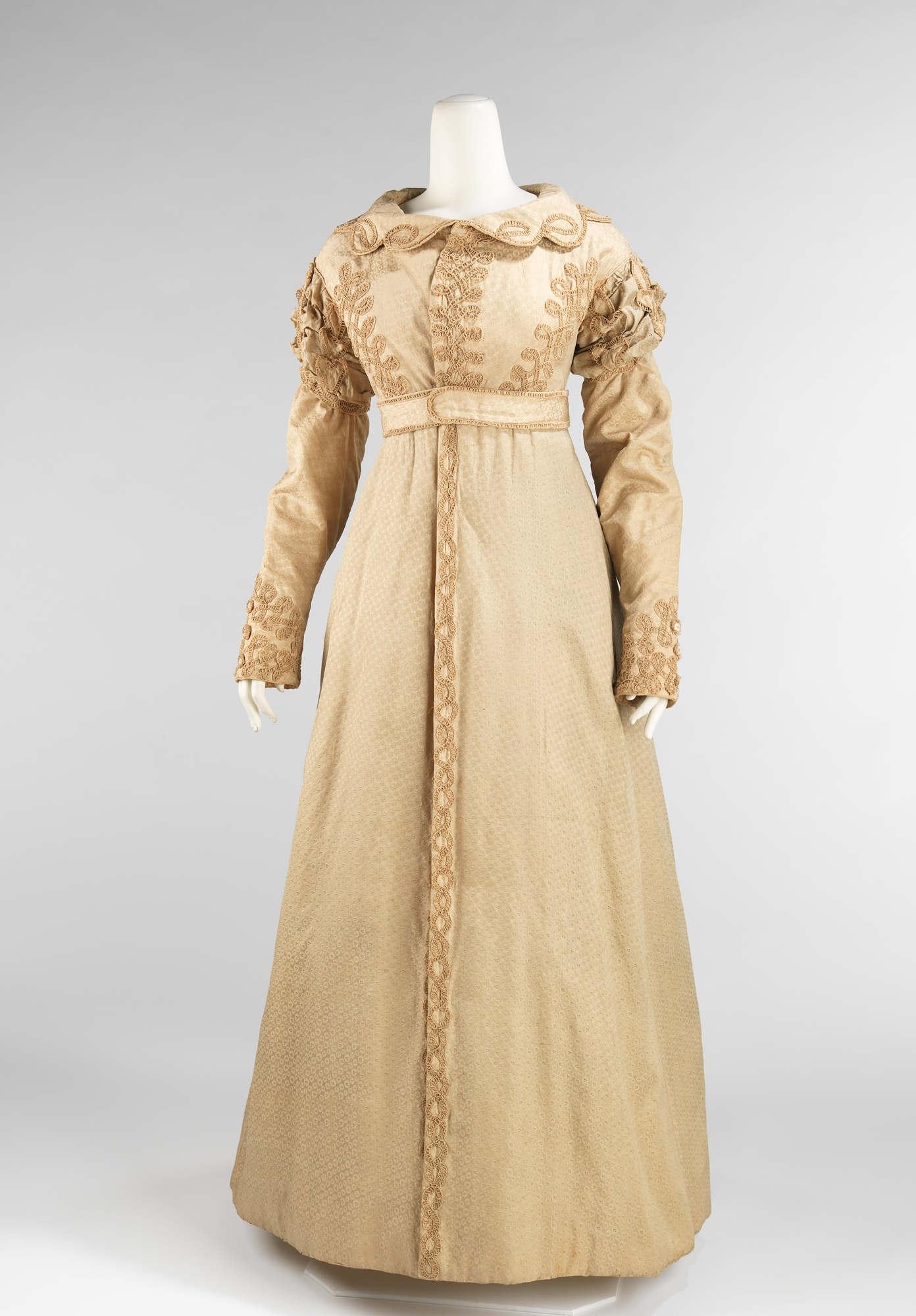
Pelisse, an early-nineteenth-century high-waisted and fitted long coat

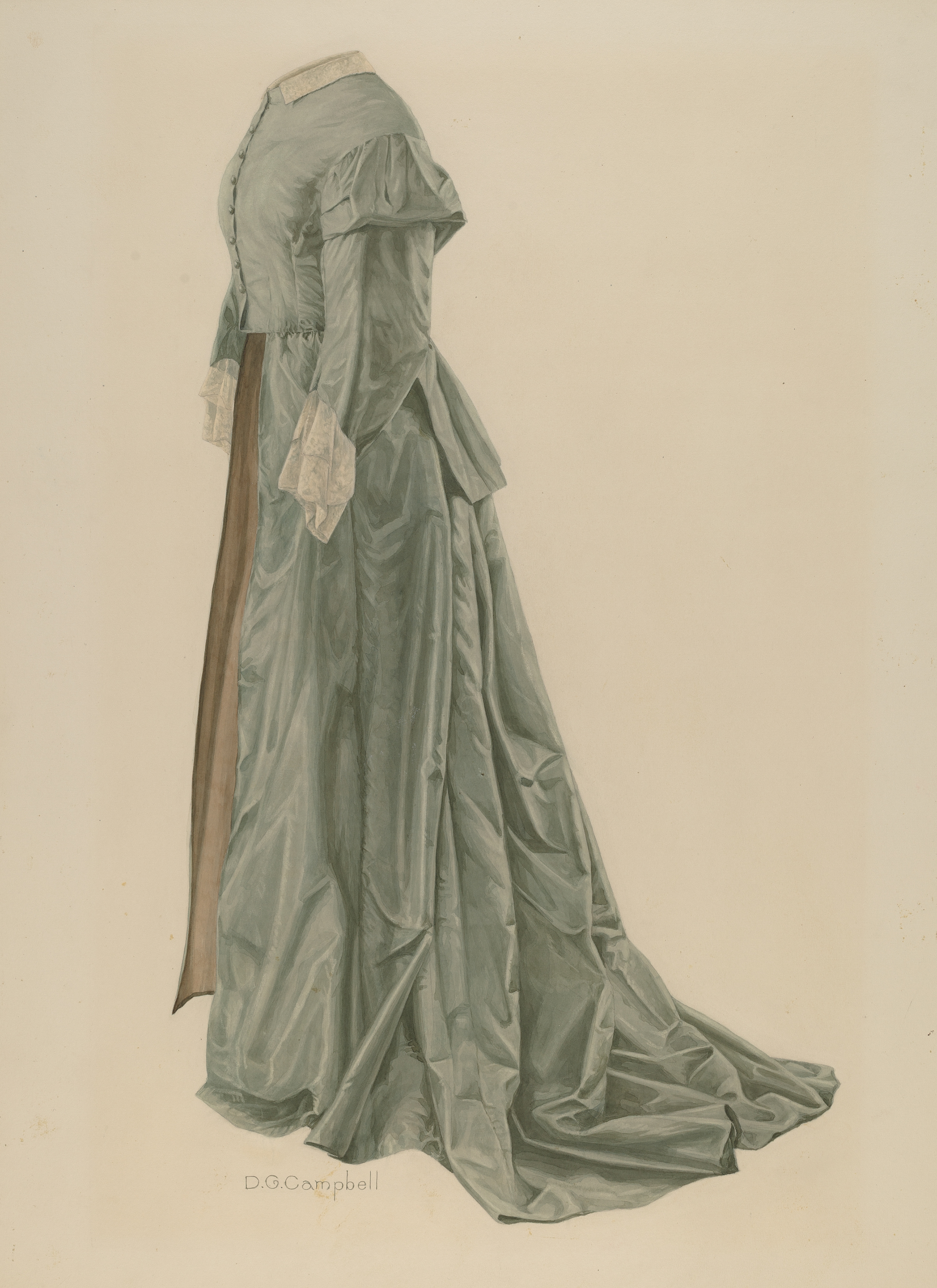
Basque bodice, a Victorian-era coat that was sometimes made with tails

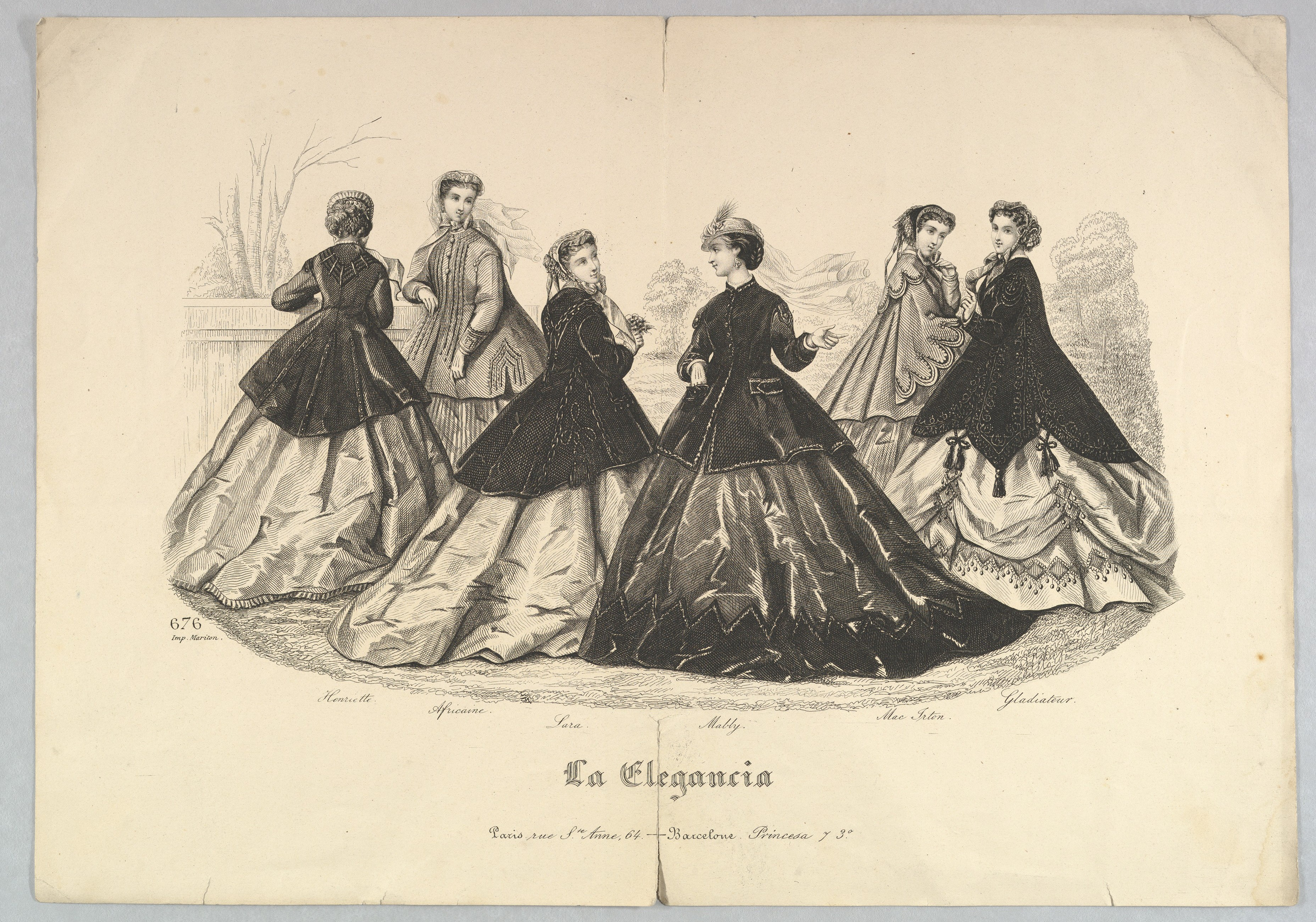
Paletot, a nineteenth-century mid- to full-length coat similar in design to the casaquin in which it is fastens in the front and is fitted to the waist before widening to drape over the skirt

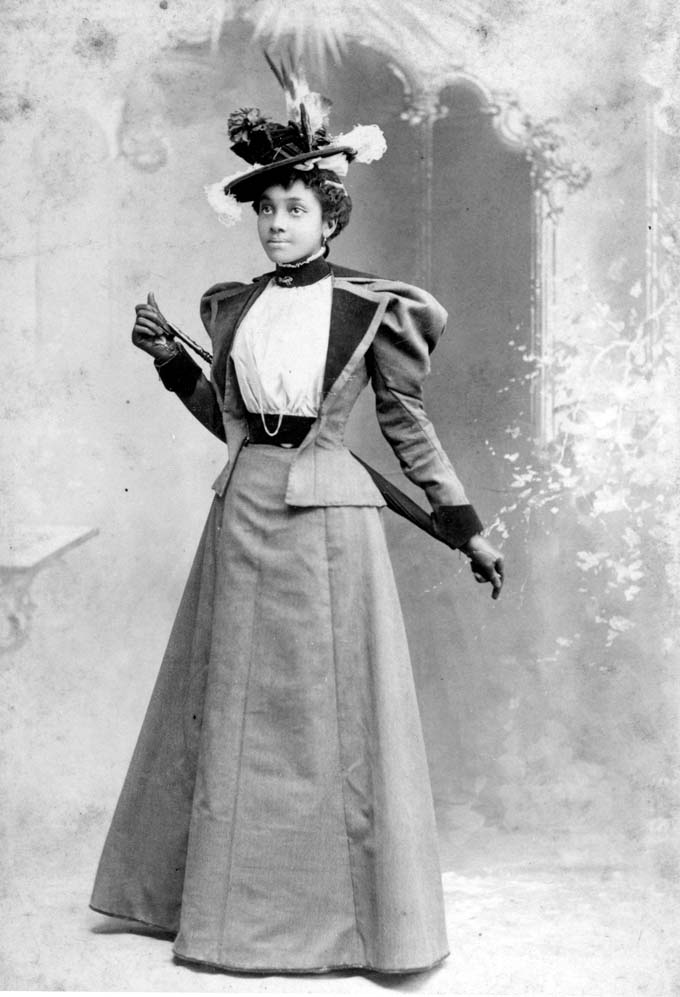
Suit coats, a development in the late nineteenth century in which coats or jackets paired with a skirt of the same cloth were worn for purposes other than as riding habits; developed into women's modern suit sets

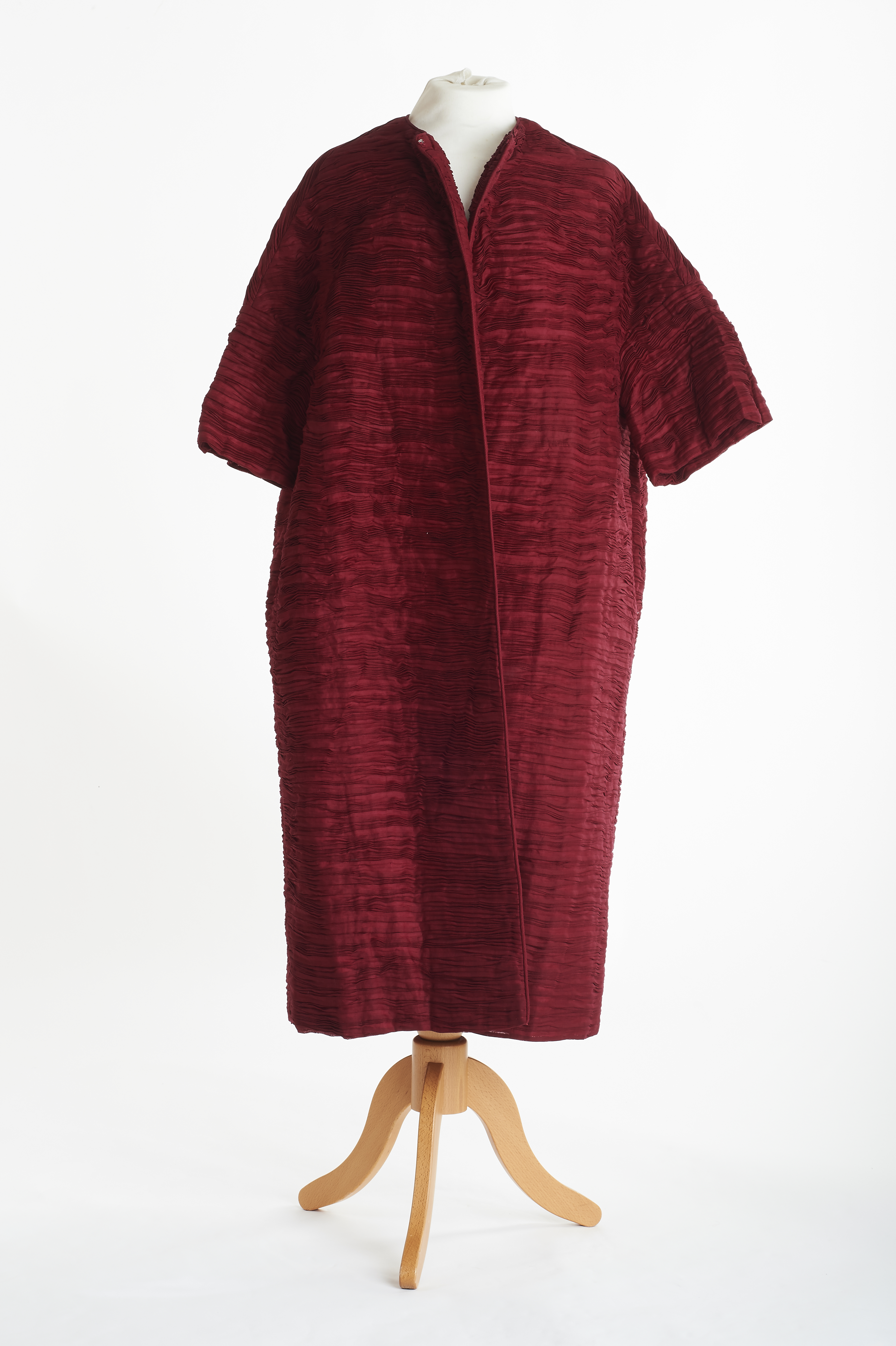
An evening coat from the 1950s by designer Sybil Connolly

=== Modern ===
The terms coat and jacket are both used around the world. The modern terms "jacket" and "coat" are often used interchangeably as terms, although the term "coat" tends to be used to refer to longer garments.

Modern coats include the:

- British Warm
- Car coat
- Chesterfield coat
- Covert coat
- Duffel coat
- Parka
- Pea coat
- Raincoat or Mackintosh
- Trench coat

== See also ==
- Jacket
- Overcoat
- Robe
- Tubada
- White coat
- Winter clothing

== Bibliography ==
- Antongiavanni, Nicholas: The Suit, HarperCollins Publishers, New York, 2006. ISBN 0-06-089186-6
- Byrd, Penelope: The Male Image: men's fashion in England 1300-1970. B. T. Batsford Ltd, London, 1979. ISBN 978-0-7134-0860-7
- Croonborg, Frederick: The Blue Book of Men's Tailoring. Croonborg Sartorial Co., New York and Chicago, 1907
- Cunnington, C. Willett; Cunnington, Phillis (1959): Handbook of English Costume in the 19th Century, Plays Inc, Boston, 1970 reprint
- Devere, Louis: The Handbook of Practical Cutting on the Centre Point System (London, 1866); revised and edited by R. L. Shep. R. L. Shep, Mendocino, California, 1986. ISBN 0-914046-03-9
- Doyle, Robert: The Art of the Tailor, Sartorial Press Publications, Stratford, Ontario, 2005. ISBN 0-9683039-2-7
- Mansfield, Alan; Cunnington, Phillis: Handbook of English Costume in the 20th Century 1900-1950, Plays Inc, Boston, 1973 ISBN 0-8238-0143-8
- Snodgrass, Mary Ellen: World Clothing and Fashion: An Encyclopedia of History, Culture, and Social Influence, Volume 1, Sharpe Reference, Armonk, NY, 2014. ISBN 978-0-7656-8300-7
- Stephenson, Angus (editor): The Shorter Oxford Dictionary. Oxford University Press, New York, 2007
- Unknown author: The Standard Work on Cutting Men’s Garments. 4th ed. Originally pub. 1886 by Jno J. Mitchell, New York. ISBN 0-916896-33-1
- Vincent, W. D. F.: The Cutter’s Practical Guide. Vol II "All kinds of body coats". The John Williamson Company, London, circa 1893.
- Waugh, Norah: The Cut of Men's Clothes 1600-1900, Routledge, London, 1964. ISBN 0-87830-025-2
- Whife, A. A (ed): The Modern Tailor Outfitter and Clothier; 4th revised ed. 3 vols. The Caxton Publishing Company Ltd, London, 1951
