= Paletot =

Any of several styles of semi-fitted to fitted coats of the 19th century

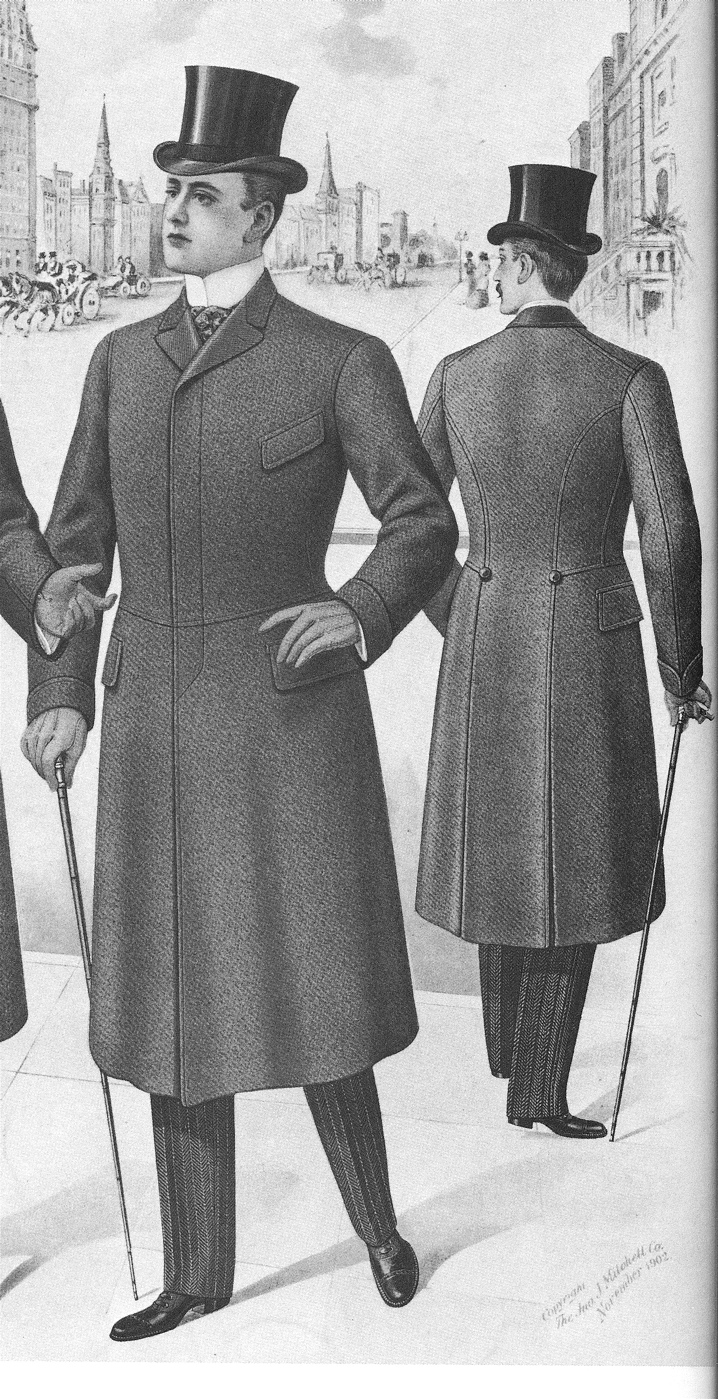
A single-breasted, fly-fronted paletot from 1903

A paletot is a type of topcoat. The name is French, but etymologically derived from the Middle English word paltok, meaning a kind of jacket.

Historically, it was a semi-fitted to fitted coat, double-breasted or single-breasted, the front sometimes fastened by a fly, with or without pleats, and with or without pockets. A modern paletot is a classic business overcoat, usually double-breasted with a 6×2 button arrangement, the top buttons placed wider apart and not fastened, with peaked lapels, a flat back and no belt. A paletot is often made of flannel or tweed in charcoal or navy blue.

== See also ==
- Chesterfield coat
- Covert coat
- Polo coat
- Duffel coat
- Pea coat
- Trench coat
