= Overcoat =

Coat worn over street dress

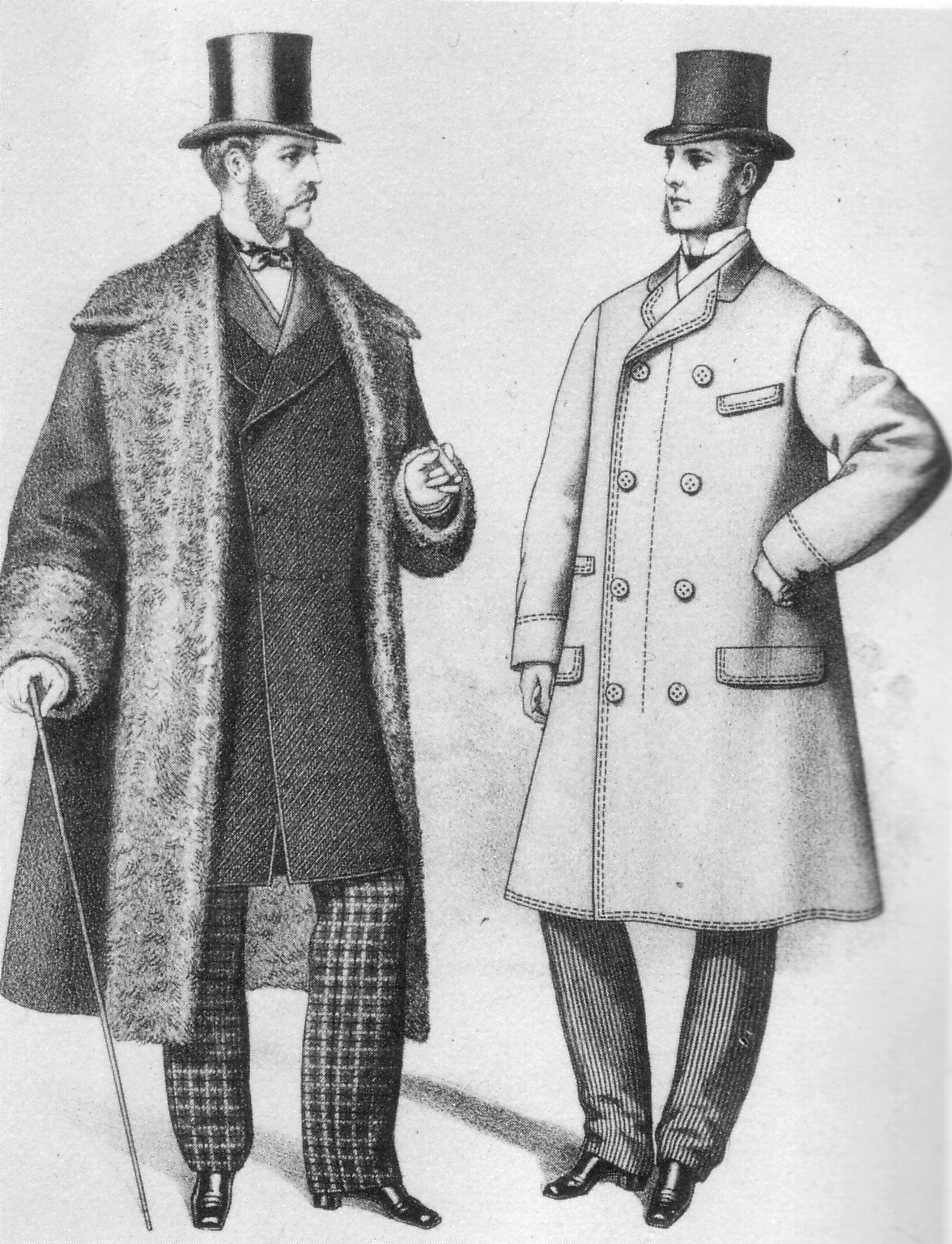
Overcoat (left) and topcoat (right) from The Gazette of Fashion, 1872

An overcoat is a type of long, thick coat intended to be worn as the outermost garment for warmth. It usually extends below the knee. Overcoats are most often used in winter when warmth is more important.

They are sometimes confused with or referred to as topcoats, which are shorter and end at or above the knees. Topcoats and overcoats together are known as outercoats. Unlike overcoats, topcoats are usually made from lighter weight cloth such as gabardine or covert, while overcoats are made from heavier cloth or fur.

== History ==
In many countries, coats and gowns reaching below the knee have been worn for centuries, often for formal uses, establishing either social status or as part of a professional or military uniform. In the 17th century, the overcoat became widely stylized and available to the different classes.

In the Western world, the general profile of overcoats has remained largely unchanged for a long time. During the Regency, the fashion was to have very form-fitting clothes, with sidebodies, waist seams, and a flared skirt. Examples of this included the frock overcoat and paletot.

=== Chesterfield coat ===
The Chesterfield is a formal, dark, knee-length overcoat with a velvet collar introduced around the 1840s in the United Kingdom. A less formal derivation is the similar, but with a lighter fabric, slightly shorter, top coat called a covert coat.

=== Greatcoat ===
A greatcoat (also watchcoat), a large, woollen overcoat designed for warmth and protection against wind and weather, features a collar that can be turned up and cuffs that can be turned down to protect the face and the hands, while the short rain-cape at the shoulders protects from the wind and repels rain. In the 19th century, such a coat was part of a soldier's military uniform, to be worn while on watch (guard duty), hence the term watchcoat.

The drape of the greatcoat reached to below the knee of the wearer, the short cape drapes to the elbow, and the capacious external pockets allow the wearer to carry dry food and other items; for example in the Petersham coat, named after Viscount Petersham. In the fashion of the Regency era (1795–1837) a greatcoat might feature several short capes, usually designed, cut, and tailored to the specifications of fit and aesthetic taste of a dandy.

Russian and Soviet armed forces used various greatcoats (Russian: шинели) as part of standard uniforms from the mid-1760s until the late-1990s.

== Topcoat ==
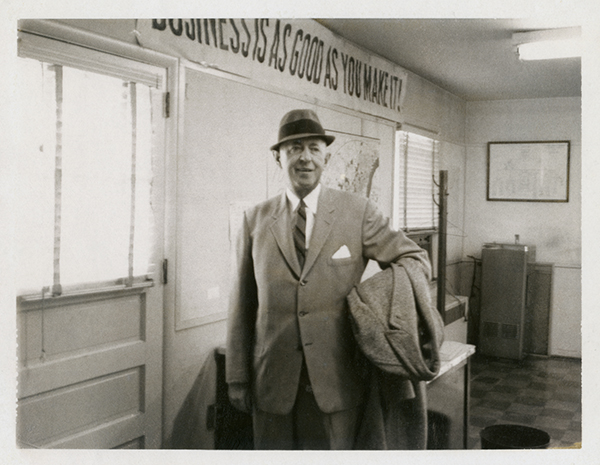
Frank Carr carrying a top coat c. 1965

A covert coat is a gentleman's overcoat typically with notched lapels which originated in the late 19th century as a "short topcoat" to be worn for hunting and horse riding.

A popular form of covert coat is the Crombie.

Since the 20th century, after the introduction of the suit for everyday use in town as opposed to the frock coat and the morning dress, the covert coat is used as a shorter, more informal topcoat option to the longer knee-length Chesterfield coat traditionally associated with formal wear.

== Examples of overcoats ==
Some of the most common historical overcoats, in roughly chronological order.

Image	Description
	The Greatcoat, a voluminous overcoat with multiple shoulder capes, prominently featured by European militaries, most notably the former Soviet Union.
	The Redingote (via French from English riding coat), a long fitted coat for men or women.
	The Frock overcoat, a very formal daytime overcoat commonly worn with a frock coat, featuring a waist seam and heavy waist suppression.
	The Ulster coat, a working daytime overcoat initially with a cape top covering sleeves, but then without; it evolved to the polo coat after losing its cape.
	The Inverness coat, a formal evening or working day overcoat, with winged sleeves.
	The Paletot coat, a coat shaped with side-bodies, as a slightly less formal alternative to the frock overcoat.
	The Paddock coat, with even less shaping.
	The Chesterfield coat, a long overcoat with very little waist suppression; being the equivalent of the "sack suit" for clothes, it came to be the most important overcoat of the next half-century.
	The Covert coat, a classically brown/fawn, straight cut, single breasted country coat that became accepted for wear in the city with a suit as well as with tweed. It has a signature four lines of stitching at the cuffs and hem. It also had a fly front closure and 2 side pockets. The collar is sometimes made of velvet.
	The British Warm, a taupe, slightly shaped, double-breasted, greatcoat, made of Melton, a heavy wool fabric, was first designed for British officers during the First World War, but was made famous by Churchill. The civilian variant usually drops the epaulettes.

== See also ==
- Coat
- Frock coat
- Morning dress
- Pea coat
- Polo coat
- Raincoat
- Trench coat
- Cape
- Military uniform
- Formal wear
- Tailoring
