= Fly (clothing) =

Covering over an opening on clothing

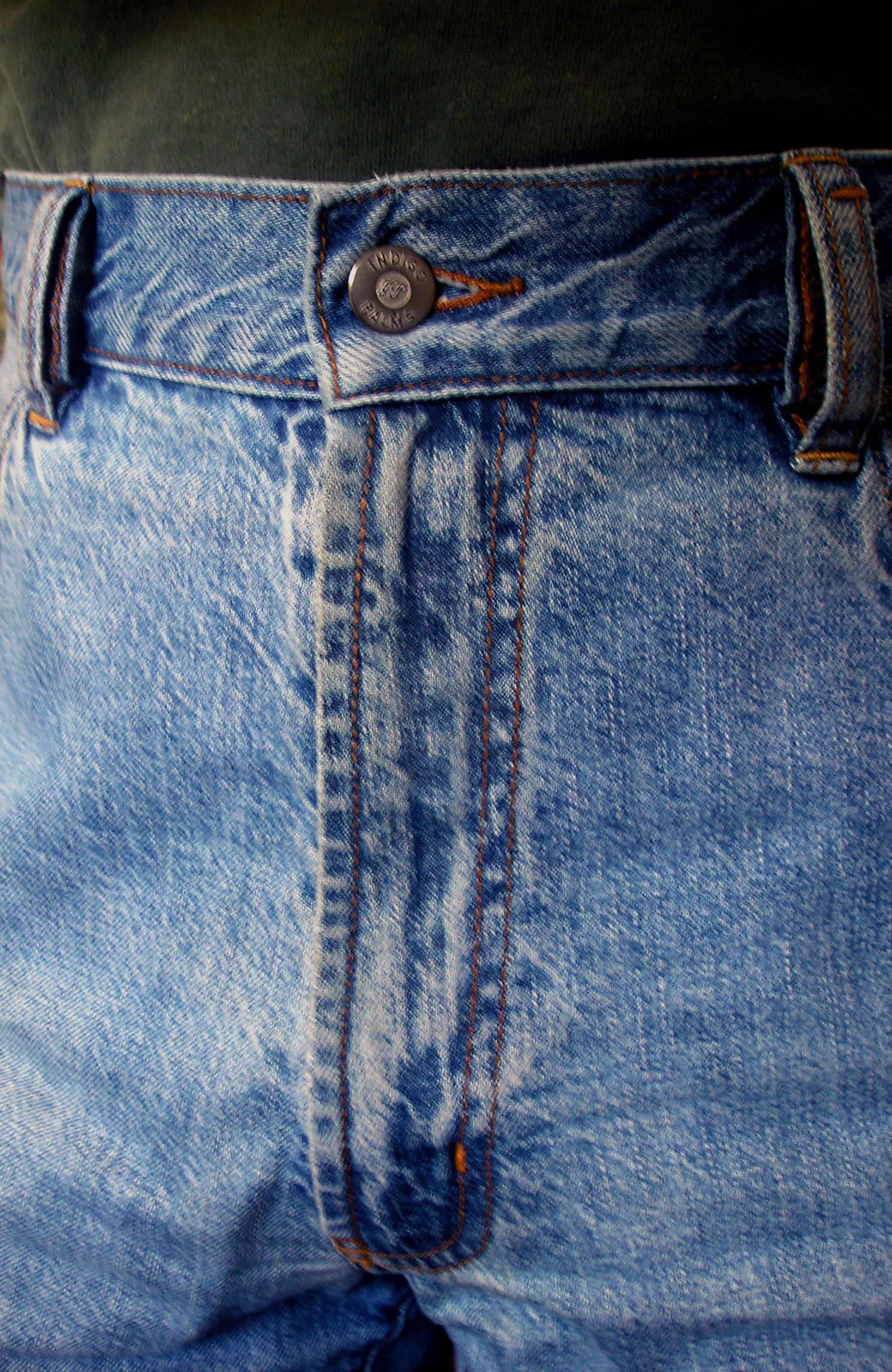
Closed fly on a pair of jeans

A fly (short for fly-front) is a strip of material covering an opening on clothing, often closed by a zipper or buttons. It is commonly found on the crotch area of trousers and the front of coats. It may also appear on certain men's undergarments such as boxers or briefs to allow for easier urination, known as a keyhole fly; in this case there is no closure on the opening, only overlapping fabric. On men's garments, the fly always opens on the wearer's right side; on women's garments, it may open either on the left or on the right.

== History ==
=== Trousers ===
Trousers have varied historically in whether or not they have flies. Originally, trousers did not have flies or other openings, being pulled down for sanitary functions. The use of a codpiece, a separate covering attached to the trousers, became popular in 16th-century Europe, eventually evolving into an attached fall-front (or broad fall). The fly-front (split fall) emerged later. Initially, flies were only put on men's clothing, as it was viewed as inappropriate for women to wear clothing that could easily be removed.

Early models of a fly for men's garments, including a metal fastener, existed in the 1850s, however they frequently rusted, and would occasionally open unintentionally. In the 20th century, the US army was one of the first buyers of flies, and zippers, integrating them into their uniforms during World War One.

=== Coats ===
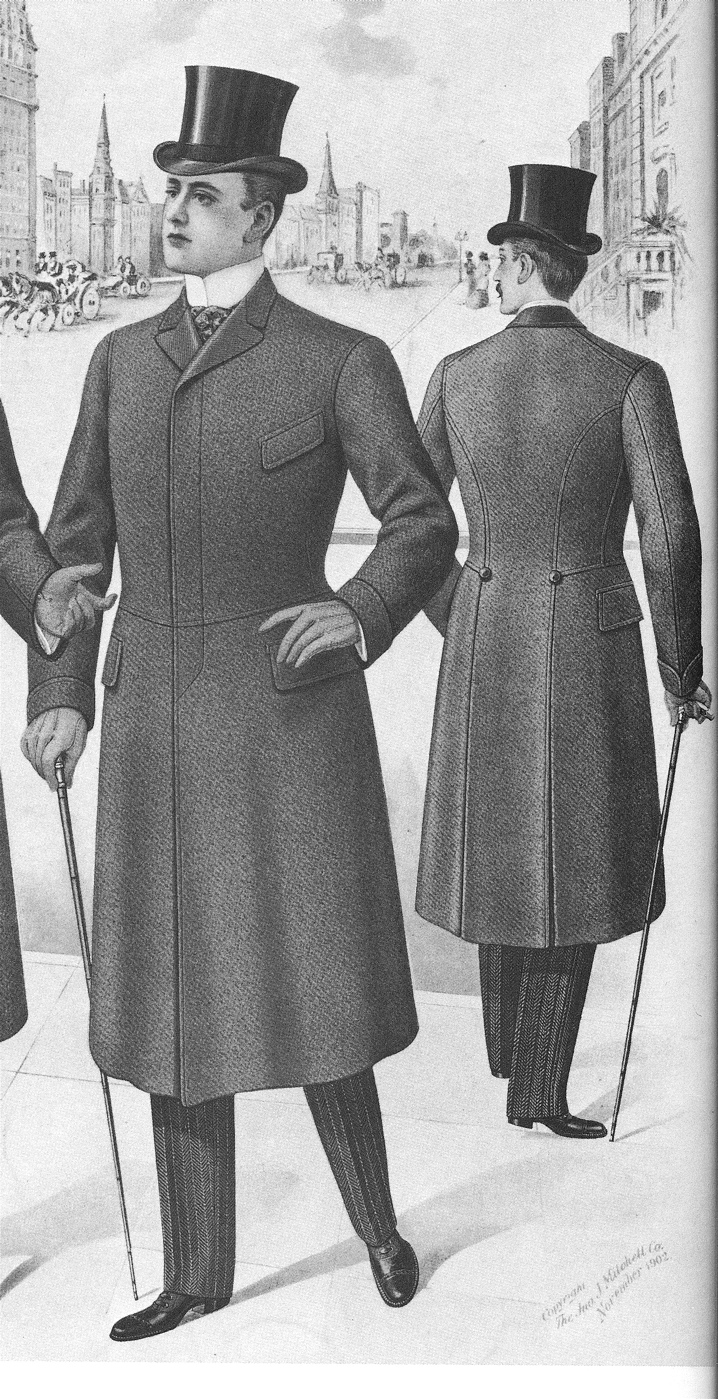
A fly-fronted paletot coat (1903)

Flies are also found on coats such as the paletot coat, since at least circa 1900.

== Related closures ==
A similar closure, sometimes incorrectly called "fly front", is a concealed button placket.
