= Over-frock coat =

Formal overcoat

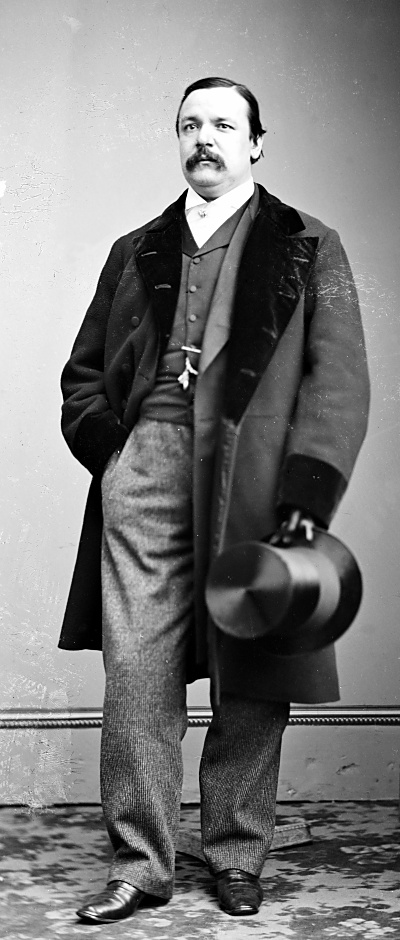
Portrait of George Augustus Sala in an over-frock coat, by Mathew Brady. c. 1855-1865

An over-frock coat is a formal overcoat designed to be worn over a frock coat if needed in cold weather. A top-frock coat may also be worn over a frock coat in milder weather. Shaped like the body coats popular in the Victorian and Edwardian periods, the over-frock coat was cut in essentially the same way as the frock coat that was worn under it, although it would be larger overall to accommodate the frock-coat worn underneath.

Like the frock coat, the over-frock would typically be single-breasted, with step lapels for informal occasions like business, and double-breasted with pointed lapels for formal occasions – weddings, funerals, balls, etc. The top-frock was usually double breasted. The formal variety was sometimes called a Prince Albert overcoat.

The Prince Albert top frock, from the later half of the 19th century, originally had a three-inch-wide velvet collar, and flap pockets at the hip, until 1893, when it became even more fitted, longer, and double-breasted.

== Description ==
Both the top-frock and over-frock coats were woollen, like most male garments of the time, and were made in varying weights, ranging from just 14oz for mild-weather topcoats, to 20 or 30oz for really cold weather. Wool was not a prerequisite, but was the most common material, and came in a range of qualities, the finest being that of a Merino sheep. Any material might be used, at a greater cost, including cashmere (from the Kashmir goat), angora (from the Angora rabbit), alpaca, or huarizo (from a hybrid of alpaca and llama).

Evening over-frock coats, worn over Evening dress could be made from Mohair (from the Angora goat), which produced an additional sheen. Evening over-frocks often have silk revers, like the dress coat worn underneath.

Both coats could be lined on the inside with fur of animals ranging from nutria or rabbit to silver fox or Imperial sable, depending on the owner's means and preferences. To order a coat lined in sable, beaver, seal, or mink from one's tailor would be prohibitively expensive for most, and to own one would mark one as a person of immense wealth and status.

The collars were very often velvet for warmth. Silk velvet was most expensive, while velvets made from cotton or other materials were more affordable.

== History ==
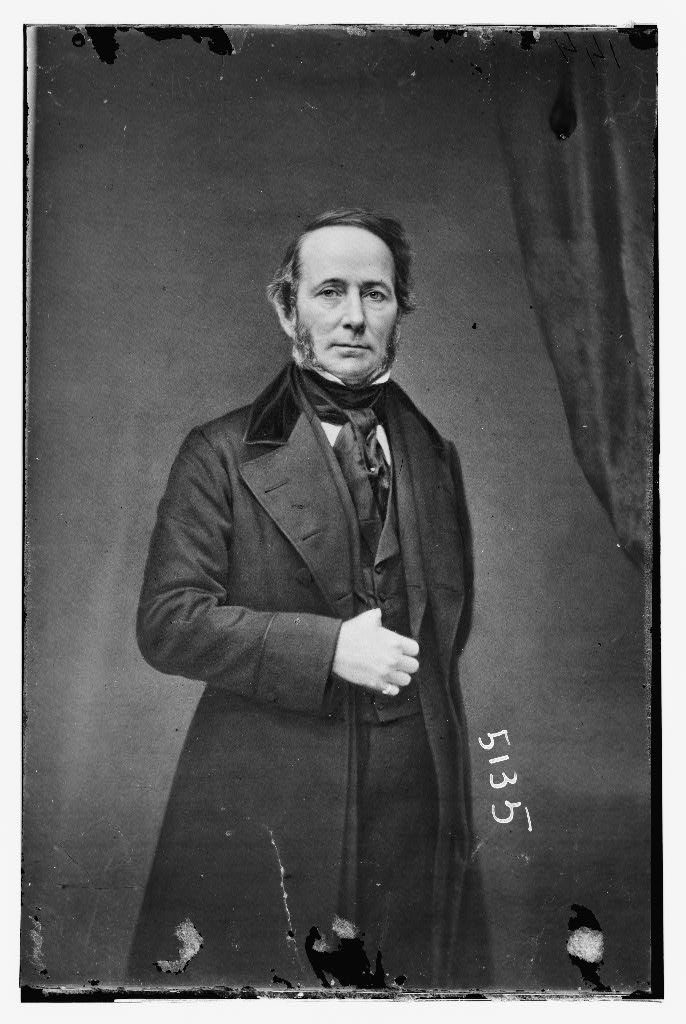
William Curtis Noyes wearing a double-breasted overfrock with velvet collar and pointed lapels.

The over-frock was the standard overcoat for much of the Victorian era and until after the First World War. Its popularity mirrored the frock coat, which replaced the tailcoat (justacorps) as day wear in the 1850s.

The frock coat, often attributed to the result of the fashion influence of the Regency dandy George Bryan 'Beau' Brummell, was almost universally black, and was worn with waistcoat and trousers, which could be of any colour. Black coat, waistcoat, and trousers - "frock suits" - were worn only for funerals (as a 'mourning suit') and the most formal of occasions. The trousers that went with it - what would be known as formal trousers - could either be checked or striped, or have no pattern at all.

The frock coat, and with it the over-frock, was increasingly rarely worn as casual wear towards the end of the 19th century, as the "sack suit", the comparatively loose modern suit was adopted for leisure wear, and the morning coat, originally for equestrian use, replaced it for some formal events. By 1926, when King George V wore a morning coat to the opening of the Chelsea flower show, the frock coat was barely ever worn, and with it the over-frock.

In 1936 King Edward VIII removed it from official British royal court dress codes.

The over-frock, like other body coats, could not survive the increasing cost of the bespoke tailoring required to make it fit properly around the waist to create the classical "hour-glass" silhouette. In the first decades of the 20th century, it was replaced by sack overcoats like the Chesterfield coat, the guard's coat, and the Ulster coat and the Inverness coats and such, mirroring the change from frock coats to modern suit jackets. The expensive over-frock became impractical in comparison.
