= Worumbo Mill =

- Formerly listed on the U.S. National Register of Historic Places
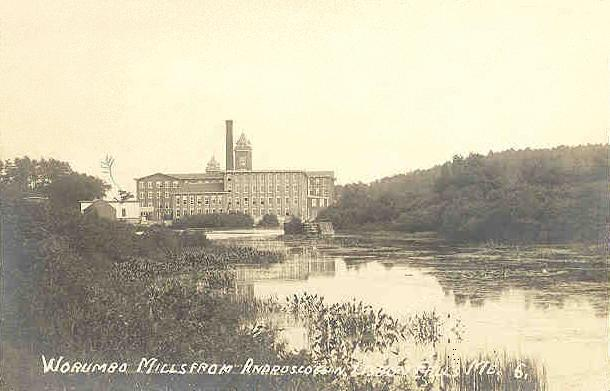

- Location within Maine Location within the United States
- Location: Canal St., Lisbon Falls, Maine
- Coordinates: 43°59′37″N 70°4′5″W
- Area: 5 acres (2.0 ha)
- Built: 1864
- Architect: William H. Stevens
- NRHP reference No.: 73000235, updated to 100001674

Significant dates
- Added to NRHP: October 15, 1973
- Removed from NRHP: October 5, 2017

The Worumbo Mill was a historic mill on the bank of the Androscoggin River in Lisbon Falls, Maine. Founded in 1864, it was at one point the community's largest employer. Its main building, dating to its founding, was destroyed by fire in 1987. The complex was listed on the National Register of Historic Places in 1973, and was delisted in 2017.

== Description ==
The surviving elements of the Worumbo Mill stand on the northern bank of the Androscoggin River, just south of the center of the village of Lisbon Falls. Originally a sprawling utilitarian 19th-century building adorned with additions and decorative towers, only two 1920 concrete buildings, one of one story and the other of three, stand today. Both are set close to Canal Street, adjacent to the dam (now used for hydroelectric generation) that provided power to the mill.

== History ==
The Worumbo Mill began as the brainchild of two residents of Lisbon Falls, Edward Plummer and H.A. Tibbetts. Later, Oliver Moses, a businessman from Bath was brought in as they sought to build a factory producing fine woolens. Ground was broken in 1864 and production began in 1865, with Mr. Moses as president of the company. Operating losses were substantial that first year at $100,000. This amount is roughly equivalent to $2 million today. During the 1920s an expansion was added to the mill and is the white building that stands today. The 1940s saw equipment upgrades. Due to pressure from overseas clothing manufacturers, the mill announced that it would be closing in 1964 and all 600 employees would lose their jobs. An attempt to restart production later failed.

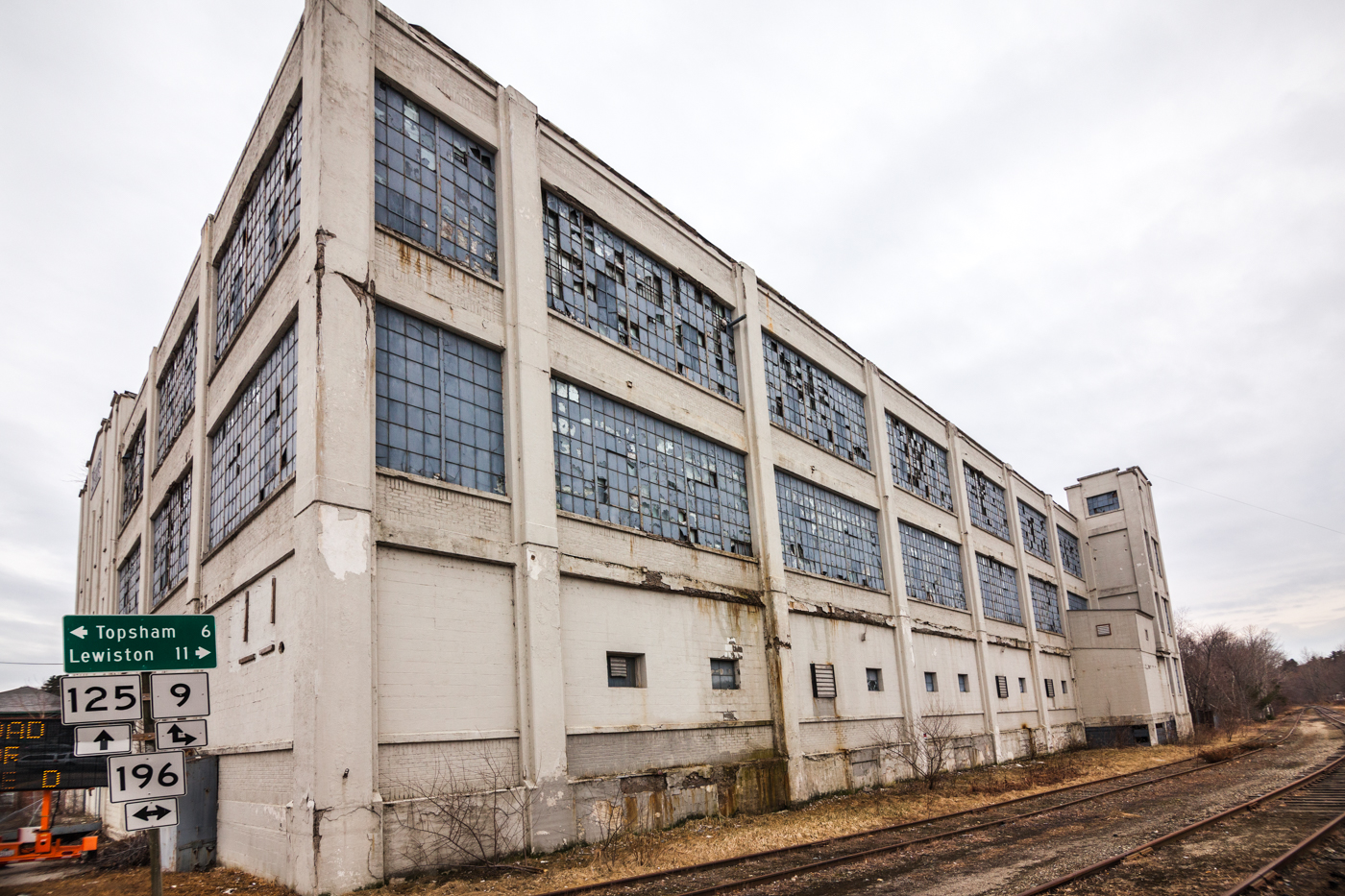
Worumbo Mill, 2016

A fire started in the original portion of the mill on July 23, 1987, completely destroying the old portion of the complex, but the 1920s expansion was spared from the flames. All told, 283 firefighters responded to the blaze. Although the fire was controlled in five hours, using 15,000 US gallons (57,000 L; 12,000 imp gal) of water per minute to do so (a total of 17,800,000 US gallons (67,000,000 L; 14,800,000 imp gal) was used the first day), crews stayed for another 13 to extinguish the flames, and returned each day for over a week to be sure no flare-ups occurred. The Maine Forest Service responded with a helicopter to drop water, and crews from many surrounding towns assisted in the battle. It was one of Maine's largest industrial fires.

The mill was also featured in the Stephen King novel 11/22/63. The mill was demolished in 2016.

== See also ==
- Polo cloth was a trade name for a cloth by the Worumbo Manufacturing Company.
- National Register of Historic Places listings in Androscoggin County, Maine
