= Polo cloth =

Woolen cloth by the Worumbo Manufacturing Company

Polo cloth was a trade name for a cloth by the Worumbo Manufacturing Company. It was a blended cloth made out of camel hair and wool. It was a loosely woven, soft, double faced twill weave construction that was primarily used for coats and overcoats. Polo cloth derives its name from the outdoor sport of polo.

Camel hair is made stronger by combining it with wool for spinning. Camel hair, tweed, and Polo cloth were among the most commonly used fabrics for overcoats.

== See also ==
- Polo coat
