= Trench coat =

Belted waterproof coat

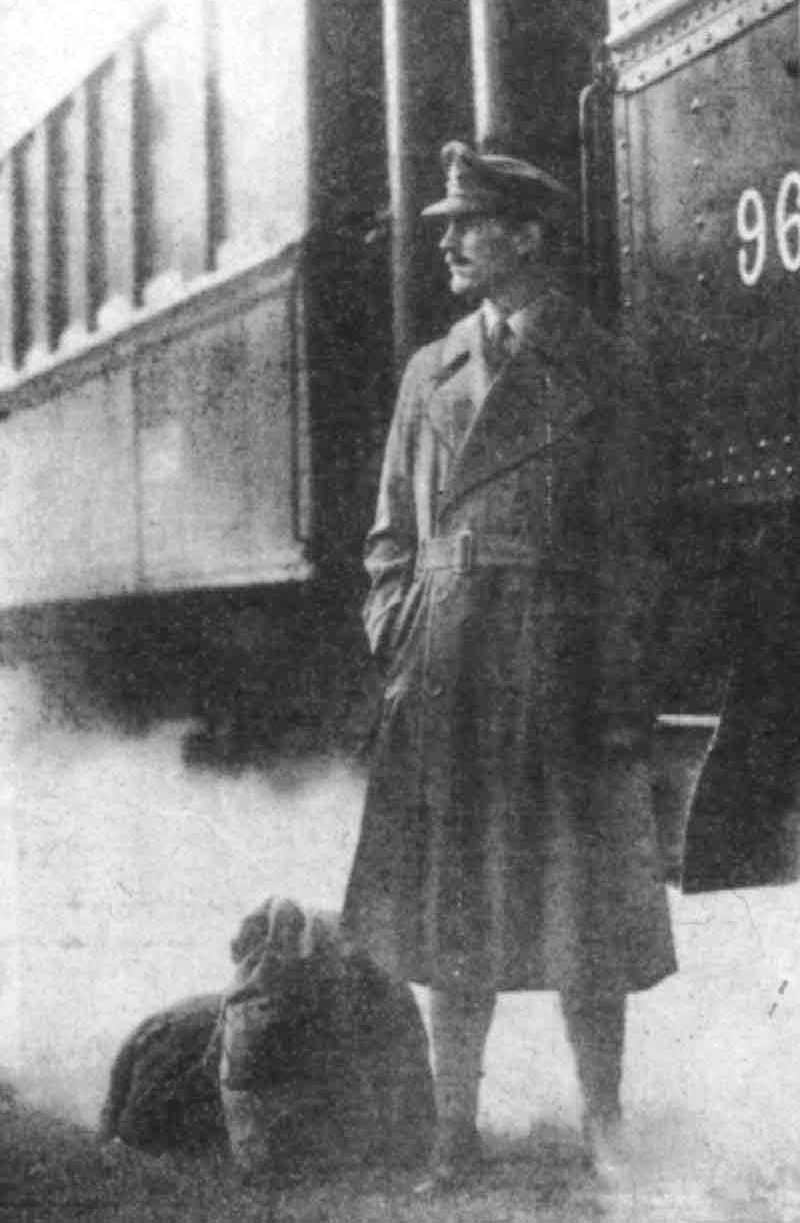
A British Army officer wearing a trench coat during World War I

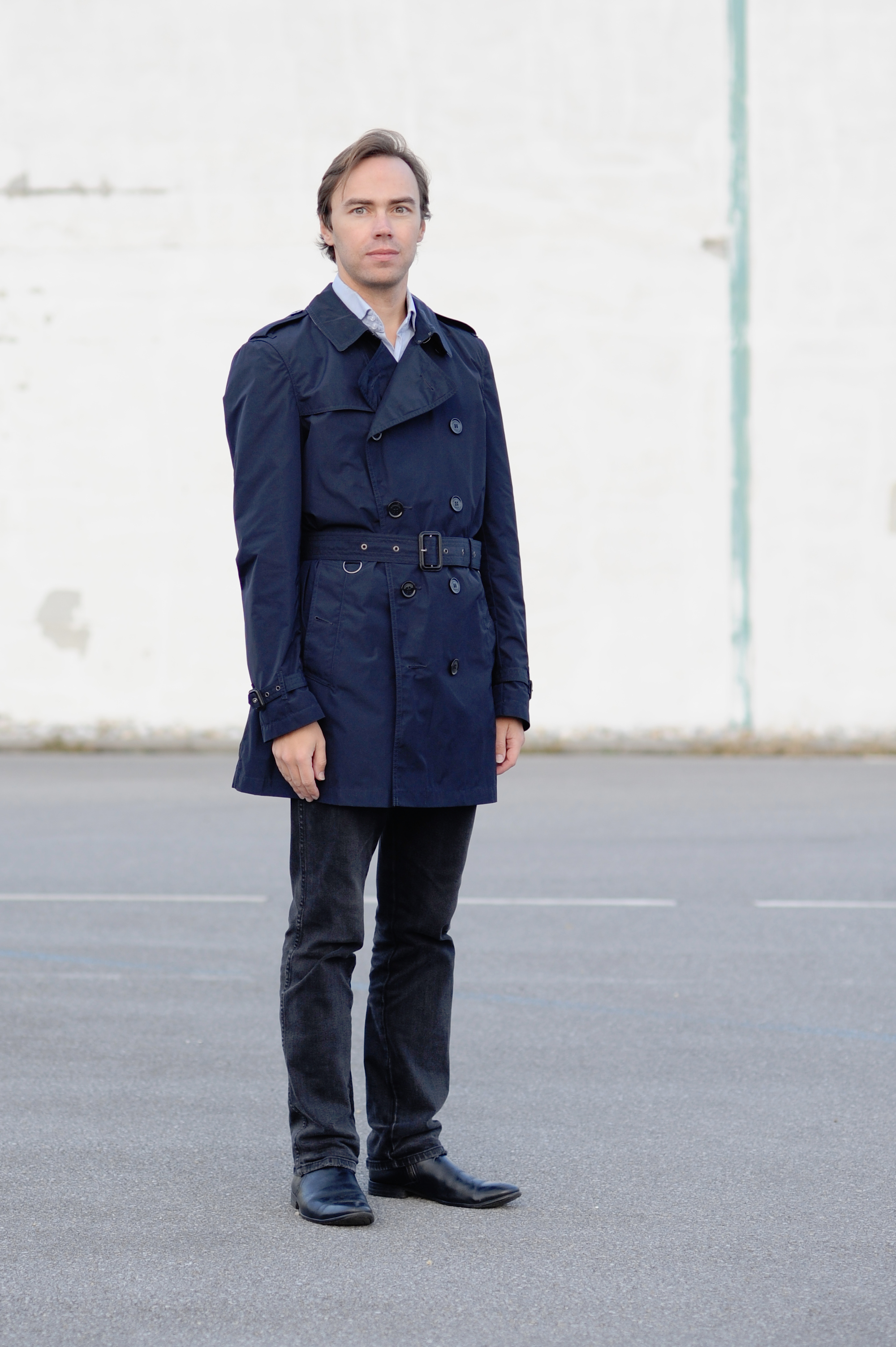
A man wearing a short navy blue–coloured trenchcoat (2018)

A trench coat is a variety of coat made of waterproof heavy-duty fabric. Originally developed for British Army officers before the First World War, they became popular while used in the trenches, hence the name.

Originally made from gabardine, a worsted wool fabric waterproofed using lanolin before weaving, the traditional colour of a trench coat was khaki. Traditionally trench coats are double-breasted with 10 front buttons, wide lapels, a storm flap, and pockets that button-close. The coat is belted at the waist with a self-belt, with raglan sleeves ending in cuff straps around the wrists that also buckle, to keep water from running down the forearm when using binoculars in the rain. The coat often has epaulettes that button-close, which were functional in a military context.

The trench coat was typically worn as a windbreaker or as a rain jacket, and not for sole protection from the cold in winter. Although some may feature a removable wool liner for additional warmth, they are usually not as warm as an overcoat. Period advertisements from the First World War reveal that the trench coat was sized to wear over the British Warm, to offer water protection when the temperature was cold enough to require the heavier coat, which explains the traditionally generous sizing of trench coats. Makers in recent years have resized trench coats downwards to conform more closely to overcoat sizing, as two coats would rarely be worn together today.

Popularised by film stars such as Humphrey Bogart, and Peter Sellers in the Pink Panther films, the trench coat has become a fashion staple, available in many colours.

== History ==
=== First World War ===
The trench coat was developed as an alternative to the heavy serge greatcoats worn by British and French soldiers in the First World War. Invention of the trench coat is claimed by two British luxury clothing manufacturers, Burberry and Aquascutum, with Aquascutum's claim dating back to the 1850s. Thomas Burberry had invented gabardine fabric in 1879 and submitted a design for a British Army officer's raincoat to the War Office in 1901.

The trench coat became an optional item of dress in the British Army, and was obtained by private purchase by officers and Warrant Officers Class I who were under no obligation to own them. No other ranks were permitted to wear them. Another optional item was the British Warm, a wool coat similar to the greatcoat that was shorter in length, also worn by British officers and Warrant Officers Class I as an optional piece.

During the First World War, the design of the trench coat was modified to include epaulettes and D-rings. The shoulder straps were for the attachment of epaulettes or other rank insignia; the D-ring was originally used for attaching map cases, swords, or other equipment to the belt, and there is a popular myth that it was for the attachment of hand grenades.

This latter design was dubbed "trench coat" by the soldiers in the front line. Many trench coats had large pockets for maps, and cleverly placed flaps and vents to deal with the odour associated with earlier rubber coats.

A range of waterproof coats was designed and sold during wartime that incorporated War Office requirements with traditional aspects of leisurewear. What became known as the "trench coat" combined the features of a military waterproof cape and the regulation greatcoat designed for British officers. Many veterans returning to civilian life kept the coats, which became fashionable for both men and women.

=== Second World War ===
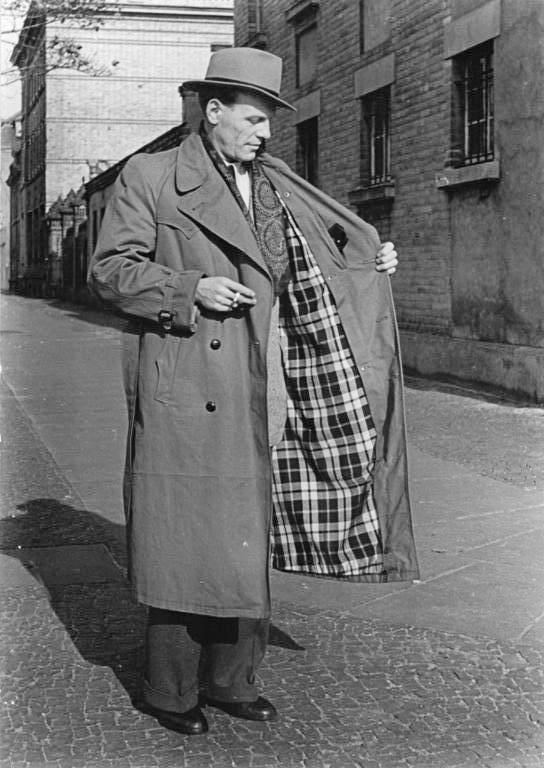
A trench coat modeled in East Germany, 1953

During the Second World War, officers of the United Kingdom continued to use the trench coat on the battlefield in inclement weather. Other nations also developed trench coat style jackets, notably the United States and the Soviet Union, and other armies of continental Europe such as Belgium, France, Germany, Greece, the Netherlands, Poland (and are often seen in war zone photographs in the 1939-40 era, even being worn by troops on the attack). As the war progressed, shorter "field jackets" became more popular, such as the Denison smock worn by British commandos, paratroopers, and snipers, and the M1941/M1943 field jackets in the US Army: these shorter garments allowed more mobility.

=== Later ===
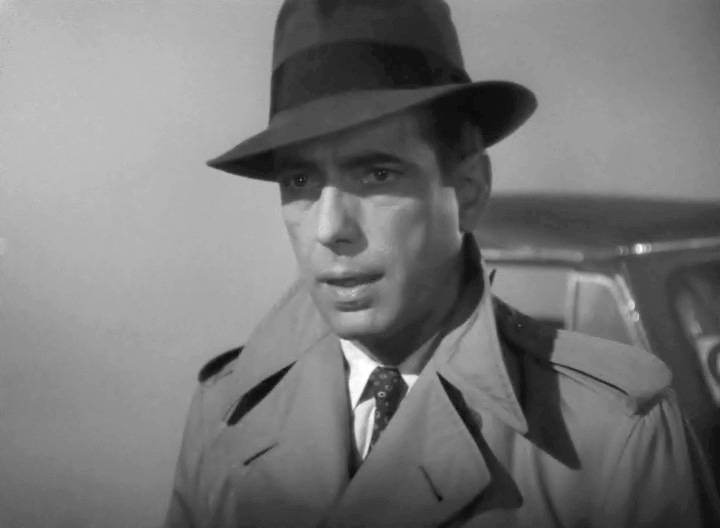
Bogart in the airport scene, Casablanca

Trench coats have remained fashionable in the decades following the Second World War. Their original role as part of an army officer's uniform lent the trench coat a businesslike respectability, although many prefer to tie the belt instead of buckling it, for a more casual look. Humphrey Bogart's Rick Blaine from Casablanca and Peter Sellers' Inspector Clouseau wore the trench coat in the public eye. In colder weather it is often worn with a hat such as a fedora or ushanka.

While similar, the heavy metal and Goth fashion trend of black oilcloth dusters are incorrectly referred to as trench coats. Early media reports of the 1999 Columbine High School massacre initially associated the perpetrators (Eric Harris and Dylan Klebold) with the school's "Trenchcoat Mafia", a clique who allegedly wore conspicuous black Australian oilcloth dusters. In the copycat W. R. Myers High School shooting days later, it was rumoured the shooter had worn a trench coat. In the wake of these incidents, many public schools in the US forbade students from wearing trench coats, both for their cultural associations and because they could conceal weapons.

== See also ==
- Coat (clothing)
- Chesterfield coat
