= Camel hair =

Natural animal fiber, soft wool of the camel

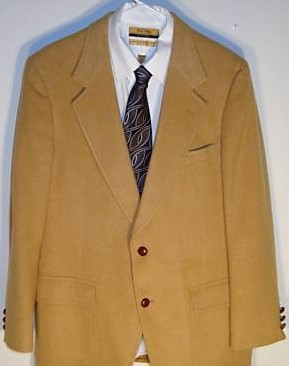
A camel hair blazer from the American fashion label Bill Blass, 2009

Camel hair specifically refers to the fur from the body of a camel, but more generally refers to the fibre (and cloth) that may be made from either pure camel hair or a blend of camel hair and another fibre.

Camel hair has two components: guard hair and undercoat. Guard hair is the outer protective fur, which is coarse and inflexible and can be woven into haircloth. (Guard hair may be made softer and plusher by blending it with another fibre, especially wool.) The undercoat, which is shorter and finer than guard hair, is less protective but more insulating. It is very soft and frequently used in the making of textiles for coats.

Camel hair is collected from the Bactrian camel, which is found across Asia from eastern Turkey and China to Siberia. Significant supplier countries of camel hair include Mongolia, Tibet, Afghanistan, Iran, Russia, China, New Zealand and Australia.

== Gathering and production ==
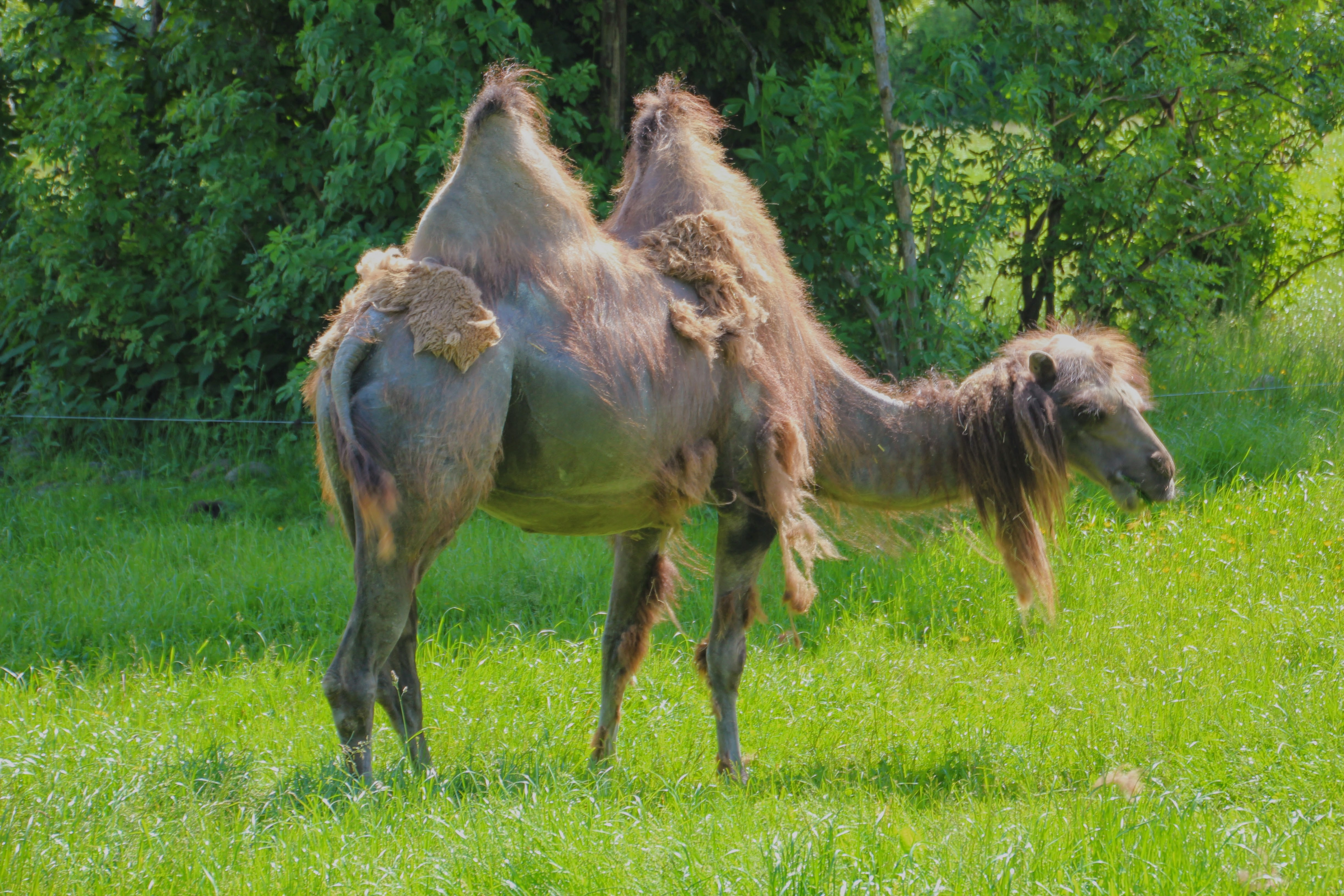
Bactrian camel shedding its hair, Givskud Zoo, Denmark

Each camel can produce approximately five pounds (2.25 kg) of hair a year. Camel hair may be collected by shearing or combing or by hand gathering the fiber that is shed naturally during the six- to eight-week moulting season in late spring.

After collection, the coarse and fine hairs are separated. Fibres are then washed to remove any dirt or debris before being spun into yarn suitable for weaving or knitting.

== Use ==
The wearing of camel hair clothing is mentioned in the Bible (Matthew 3:4) and it was traditionally used for tents, carpets and cloaks by the Berbers and in other areas where camels were kept. Its good thermal properties provide insulation.

Pure camel hair is recorded as being used for western garments from the 17th century onwards, and from the 19th century a mixture of wool and camel hair was used. The first fashion brand to popularise camel hair in clothing was Jaeger, a British manufacturer that specialised in the use of fine woollen fabrics for coats and suits. It became popular in the U.S. in the 1920s and 1930s, having been introduced through the sport of polo, where a casual camel hair coat was worn by players in between matches.

Camel hair may be blended to create fabrics suitable for coats, outer sweaters and underwear. The long coarser hair may be used as a backing for carpets.

Although most camel hair is left as its natural tone of golden tan, the hair can be dyed and accepts dye in the same way as wool fibres.

== See also ==
- International Year of Natural Fibres
- Polo cloth
- Puttoo
