= Crombie (clothing) =

British fashion company

Crombie1805 Ltd.
- Type: Private
- Industry: Apparel, accessories
- Founded: 1805, Aberdeen, Scotland
- Founder: John Crombie
- Headquarters: London, United Kingdom
- Products: Coats, suits, fashion accessories
- Website: crombie.co.uk

Crombie 1805 Ltd., formerly known as J&J Crombie Ltd., are the owners of the clothing and accessories brand Crombie brand. They are known for luxury coats, the Crombie name and the brand being so well known that the word is included in The Oxford English Dictionary: "Crombie -used to designate a type of Overcoat, Jacket etc made by J&J Crombie Ltd".

'Crombie' is sometimes used by other companies to refer to their own coats produced in the style of Crombie's most famous three-quarter length (usually wool) overcoats, although the Crombie company are known to take legal action to prevent this trademark word from being used generically.

== History ==
Crombie was founded by John Crombie and his son James in Aberdeen, Scotland, in 1805, making it one of Britain's oldest brands. Crombie has manufactured from several different mills in Scotland and England for over two centuries, initially at Cothal Mills in Aberdeen, and most famously from 1859 at Grandholm Mill also in Aberdeen. Crombie began as a producer of luxury cloth, which it sold to cloth merchants and direct to London tailors. By the 1850s, Crombie had won awards from Queen Victoria and Napoleon III at the Great Exhibition in London and the Exposition Universelle in Paris respectively. Crombie expanded from weaving the cloth to creating its own coats. A key factor in Crombie's expansion, from the 1860s onwards, was the receipt of military contracts. Crombie supplied officers' uniforms to the British Army and Royal Air Force in the First and Second World Wars. After the Second World War, Crombie became part of Illingworth Morris; at that time Britain's largest woollen textile company, of which actress Pamela Mason, wife of Hollywood actor James Mason, was the majority shareholder.

In 1883 the company registered its incorporated status as a company limited by shares under the Companies Acts 1862 to 1880, in Scotland on 20 November. The founding Crombie family sold their interest in the company in 1928, to another British textile family, the Salts (the founders of Saltaire in West Yorkshire). Crombie had export sales to Japan and the United States. with Japanese sales said to have climaxed to £50,000 per year in the 1920s, which equates to approximately £2.35 million in today. By the 1930s Crombie coats had commenced advertisements for both male and female genders in Canadian, Australian and US newspapers. The Crombie trademark was registered on 7 September 1949. Initially the design type was said to hold shields containing figurative elements or inscriptions. The trademark was later adapted with the addition of various leaves and thistles in 2011.

Beginning in the late 1950s, Crombie coats were fashionable among modernists, who saw them as a stylish item of clothing that enhanced their clean-cut image. It was an alternative to the popular fishtail parka or trenchcoat. As the 1960s wore on, and into the early 1970s, Crombie-style coats were popular within Britain's vibrant youth culture, particularly the suedehead subculture.

In the 1980s the company was purchased and became privately owned.

Customers have included King George VI, Winston Churchill, Cary Grant, Dwight D Eisenhower and John F. Kennedy. Jack Nicholson wore several styles of Crombie coat in his role as The Joker in the 1989 film, Batman.

In 1990, production at the Grandholm Mill ceased, and was moved to other mills in Scotland and England. The A-listed Grandholm factory site was converted into a residential project in 2005.

From 1995 to 2004, Crombie also held the royal warrant as a supplier to the Prince of Wales. In 2014 it was announced that the Twelfth Doctor, played by Peter Capaldi, would wear a navy Crombie coat with a crimson lining. Such was the success of Capaldi's role as the Doctor that Crombie saw a major increase in sales directly attributed to this. The Crombie style incorporated a heavy, dark, woollen knee-length overcoat paired with a red, silk handkerchief in the upper pocket. In 1996 designer William Johnston Ewart, inspired by the deep tones of the Crombie Overcoating Range, created tartan which was placed on the Scottish Register of Tartans as the Crombie House Check.

Crombie had retail stores in London, Manchester and Edinburgh and sold through independent retailers such as Harrods and department stores in North America, Europe and East Asia.

In March 2022 it was announced that Crombie was under new ownership. Crombie 1805 acquired the business and the trademarks of J. & J. Crombie Ltd.

In June 2024, Grace Wales Bonner introduced a collaboration with Crombie on the catwalk at Paris Fashion Week.
