= British Warm =

British military greatcoat

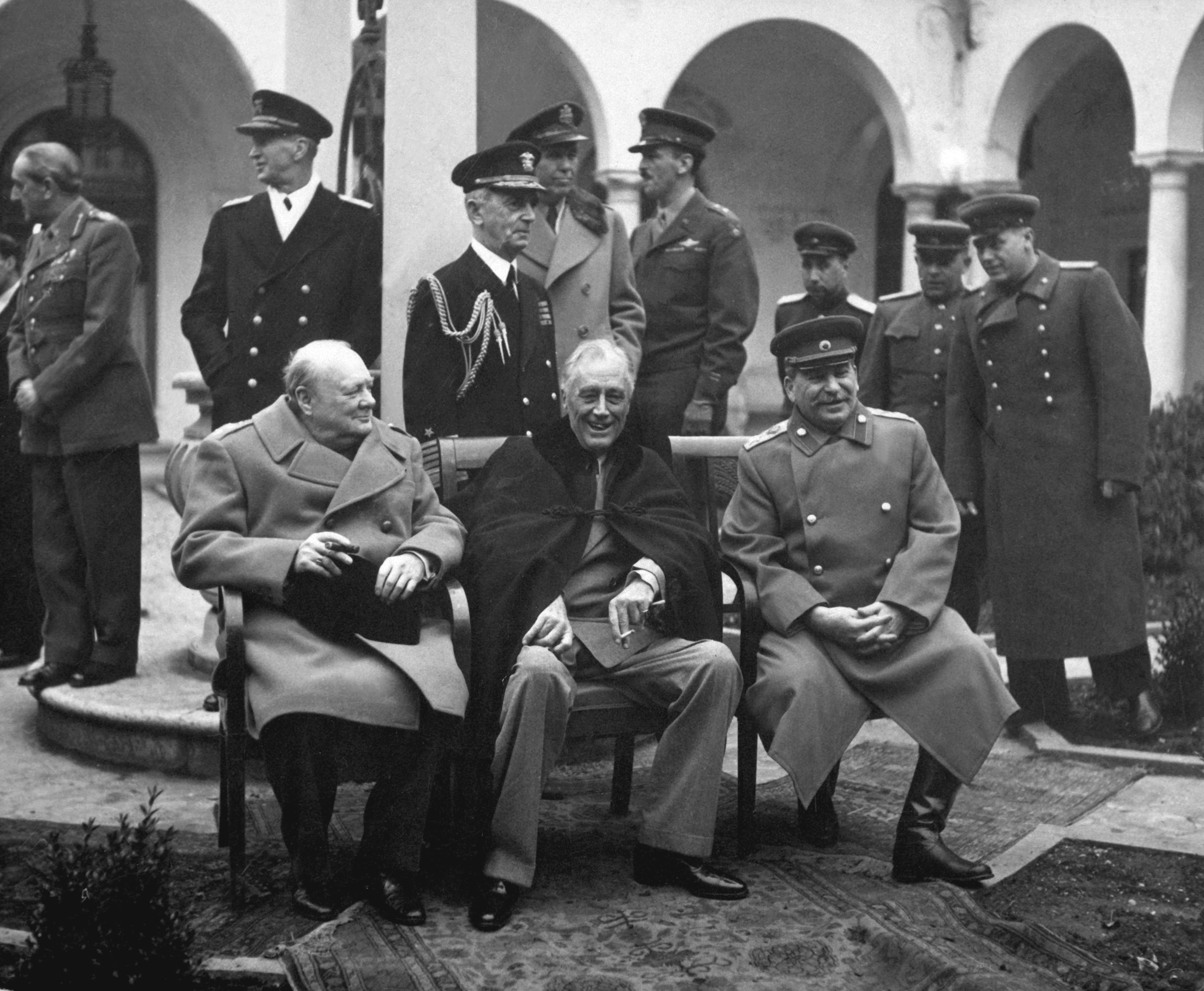
Churchill at the Yalta summit, wearing a British Warm

A British Warm, British warm or British Warm overcoat is a type of woollen overcoat based on the greatcoats worn by British Army officers in the First World War.

== History ==
The British Warm first appeared around 1914 as a military greatcoat for British officers. It was made famous, however, by Winston Churchill. According to Scottish clothmakers Crombie, the term "British Warm" was coined to describe their version of the coat worn by around 10% of British soldiers and officers. It is currently the only authorised overcoat for serving British Army officers.

== Characteristics ==
A British Warm is typically a heavy, double-breasted wool coat made from a 100% wool cloth known as Melton. It is taupe-coloured, has peak lapels and leather buttons, often has epaulettes, and is slightly shaped. It falls just above the knee, and is sometimes belted.
