= Covert coat =

Type of overcoat

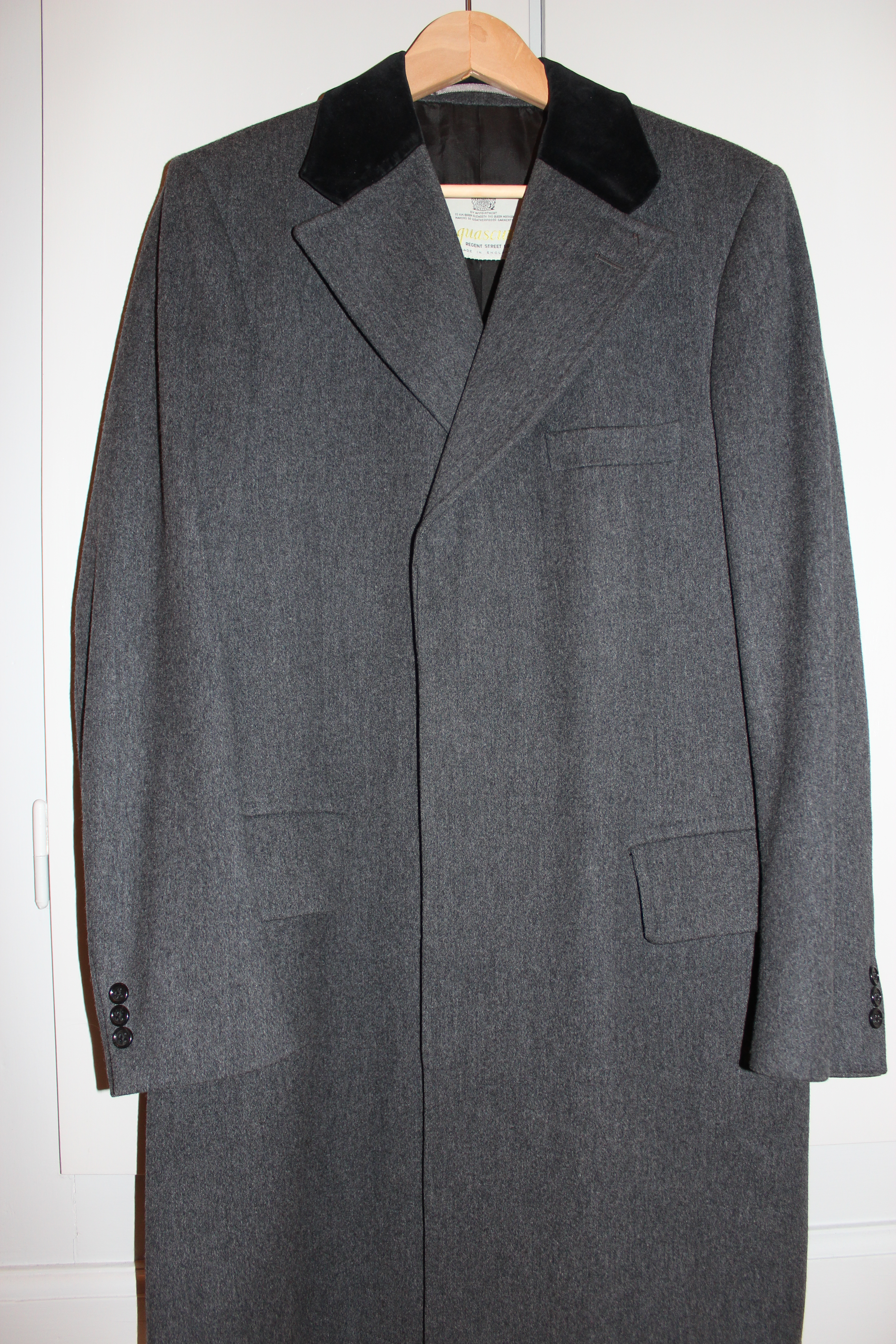
Grey wool covert coat with notched lapels and black velvet collar, made by Aquascutum

A covert coat is a gentleman's overcoat typically with notched lapels which originated in the late 19th century as a "short topcoat" to be worn for hunting and horse riding.

A popular form of covert coat is the Crombie.

Since the 20th century, after the introduction of the suit for everyday use in town as opposed to the frock coat and the morning dress, the covert coat is used as a shorter, more informal topcoat option to the longer knee-length Chesterfield coat traditionally associated with formal wear.

== Design ==
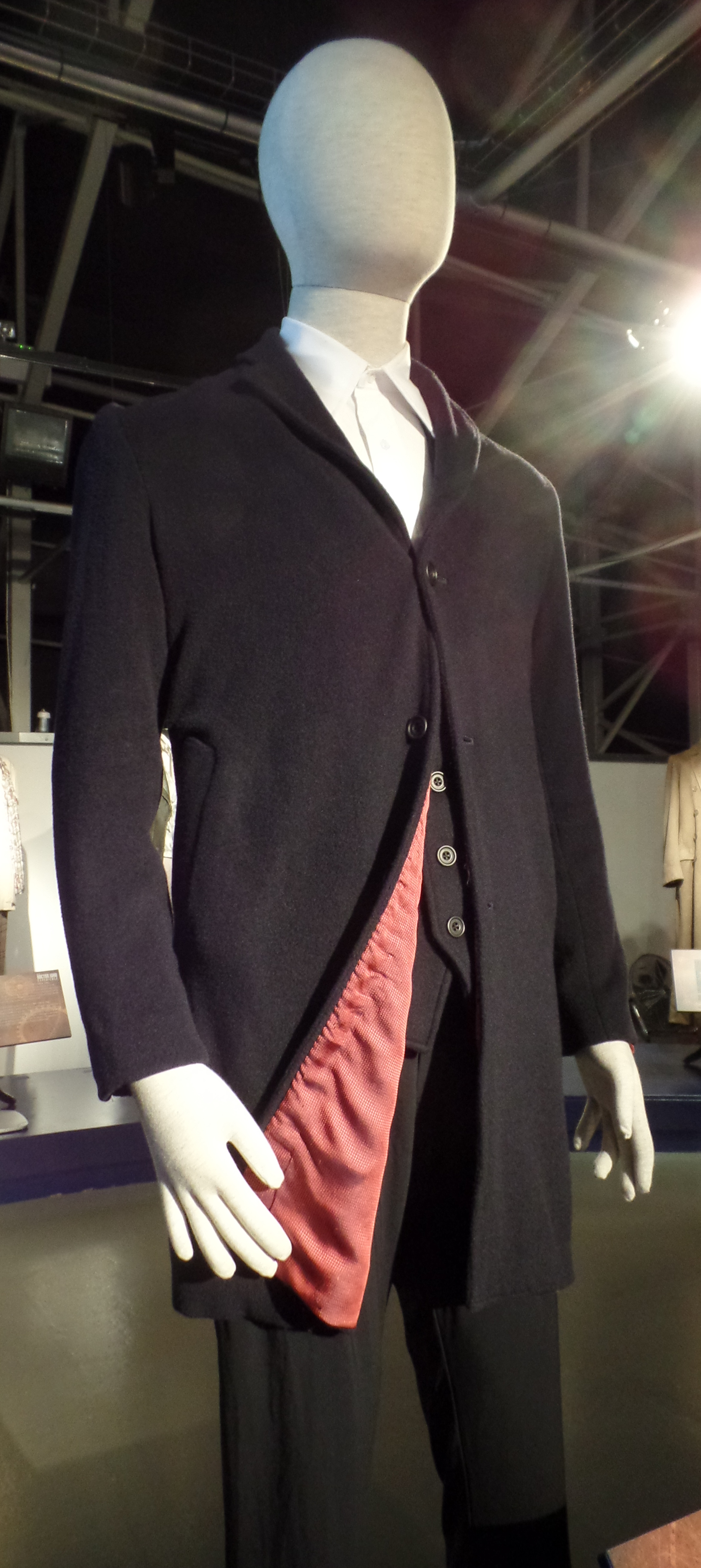
The 12th Doctor's costume, on display at the Doctor Who Experience

Covert cloth, from the French "couvert" (covered), is a heavy tweed named after a covered area rich in game wildlife that would serve as a starting point on a hunt. A covert coat is always single-breasted with notched lapels, a centre vent, flap pockets, and a signature four (sometimes five) lines of stitching at the cuffs and hem; a ticket pocket is optional. The collar may be constructed of covert cloth or velvet. The traditional colour varies from a light greenish-tan brown to a fawnish mix to a rather deep tannish-green, but variants in grey and navy are also common.

== History ==
Cordings, a British fashion retailer, claims the creation of the covert coat.

== Examples ==
- worn by George VI and Edward VIII.
- worn by Jason Statham and Stephen Graham in the 2000 crime comedy film Snatch.
- worn during the 2015 General Election in UK by UKIP and later Brexit Party leader Nigel Farage.
- worn by Peter Capaldi when he played the Twelfth Doctor on Doctor Who.
