= Chesterfield coat =

Formal overcoat

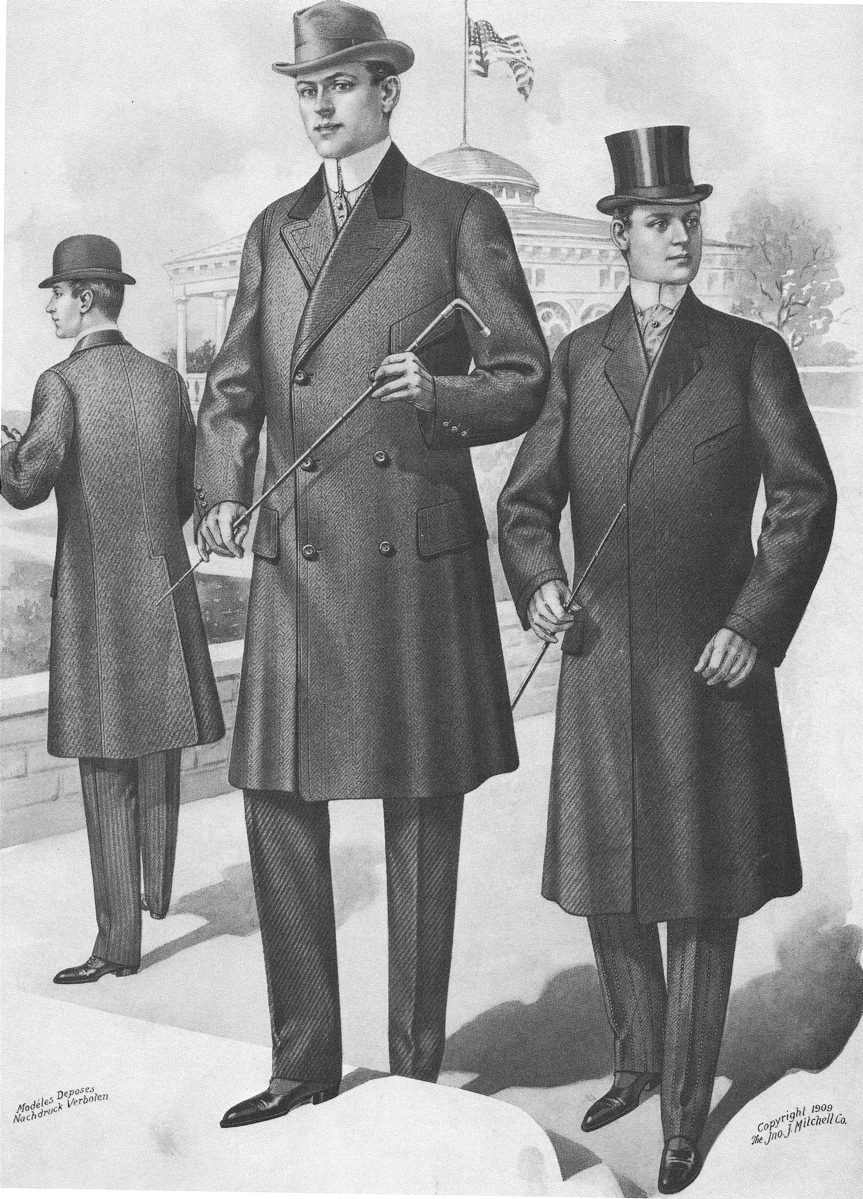
A 1909 fashion plate of the new Chesterfield

The Chesterfield is a formal, dark, knee-length overcoat with a velvet collar introduced around the 1840s in the United Kingdom. A less formal derivation is the similar, but with a lighter fabric, slightly shorter, top coat called a covert coat.

== History ==
The Chesterfield coat, with its heavy waist suppression using a waist seam, gradually replaced the over-frock coat during the second half of the 19th century as a choice for a formal overcoat, and survived as a coat of choice over the progression from frock coat everyday wear to the introduction of the lounge suit, but remained principally associated with formal morning dress and white tie. Its namesake was George Stanhope, 6th Earl of Chesterfield, then a leader of British fashion.

== Characteristics ==
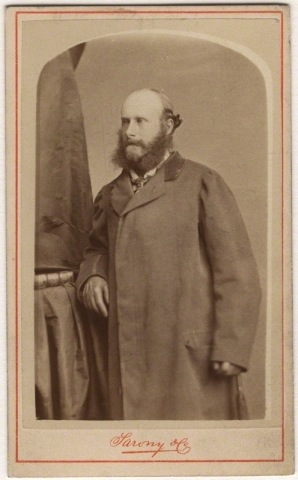
George Stanhope, 7th Earl of Chesterfield, circa 1860, is wearing an early example of a Chesterfield coat (1860).

The dark Chesterfield, which comes with a defining velvet collar has no horizontal seam or sidebodies, but can still be somewhat shaped using the side seams and darts. It can be single- or double-breasted, and has been popular in a wide variety of fabrics, typically heavier weight tweeds, or charcoal and navy, and even the camel hair classic, although such fabrics may be more associated with a more casual polo coat. These variations make it extremely versatile, so it can be worn with a city suit or even semiformal dress, as well as casual sports jackets. It was a staple of smartly dressed men's wardrobes from the 1920s to 1960s, and has become a classic style for both men and even women.

== Popular culture ==
- Doctor Who features Chesterfield coats being worn by many incarnations of the Doctor; the fifth played by Peter Davison from The Awakening to The Caves of Androzani, the eighth played by Paul McGann in The Night of the Doctor, the tenth played by David Tennant from The Christmas Invasion to The End of Time, the twelfth played by Peter Capaldi in Hell Bent, the thirteenth played by Jodie Whittaker in Spyfall, the fourteenth played by David Tennant from The Power of the Doctor to The Giggle, and the fifteenth played by Ncuti Gatwa in Lucky Day. It also features some worn by Jackson Lake played by David Morrissey in The Next Doctor, General Alistair Gordon Lethbridge-Stewart in The Five Doctors, Kate Stewart (Alistair's daughter) in 73 Yards, Ratcliffe played by George Sewell in Remembrance of the Daleks, Mr Diagoras played by Eric Loren in Daleks in Manhattan, and the Half-Face Man played by Peter Ferdinando in Deep Breath. Some were also worn by incarnations of the Master; the Reborn one played by Alex Macqueen in Dominion, the war one played by Derek Jacobi in UNIT and the spy one played by Sacha Dhawan in Spyfall and Ascension of the Cybermen|The Timeless Children.
- A Chesterfield coat was iconically worn by Dr. Watson, a doctor who is also a veteran of the Second Anglo-Afghan War and a companion to Detective Sherlock Holmes in many stories by Sir Arthur Conan Doyle.
- Batman: The Animated Series features a blue Chesterfield coat worn by Jervis Tetch (Roddy McDowall), a mad scientist themed on the Mad Hatter from Lewis Carroll's Alice's Adventures in Wonderland and Through the Looking-Glass.
- Roger Moore wears a navy Chesterfield coat as James Bond in the 1973 film "Live and Let Die"
