= Inverness cape =

Weatherproof, sleeveless overcoat

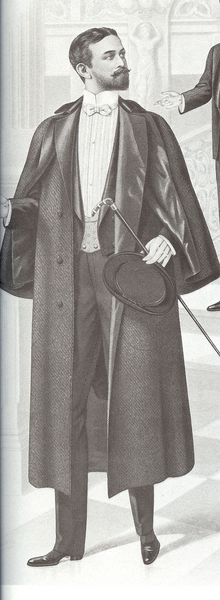
The formal form with lapels, 1901

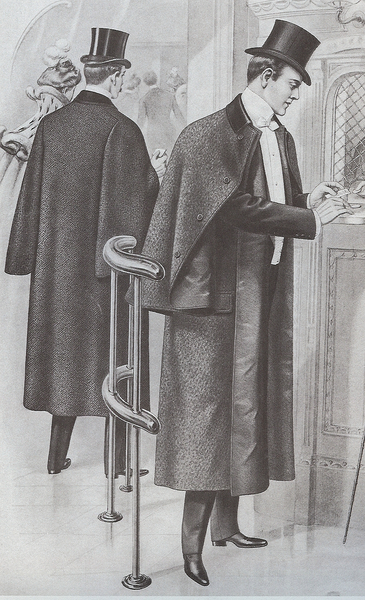
Formal coat without lapels, 1900

Fashion plates of Inverness capes

The Inverness cape is a form of weatherproof outer-coat. It is notable for being sleeveless, the arms emerging from armscyes beneath a cape (the sleeved version is an Inverness coat; the shorter-caped, sleeved version is an Ulster coat). The cape is also called havelock after Henry Havelock.

The Inverness cape is a water-repellent garment. The extra layer of cloth at the shoulders traditionally hindered rain from soaking through the wool.

== History ==
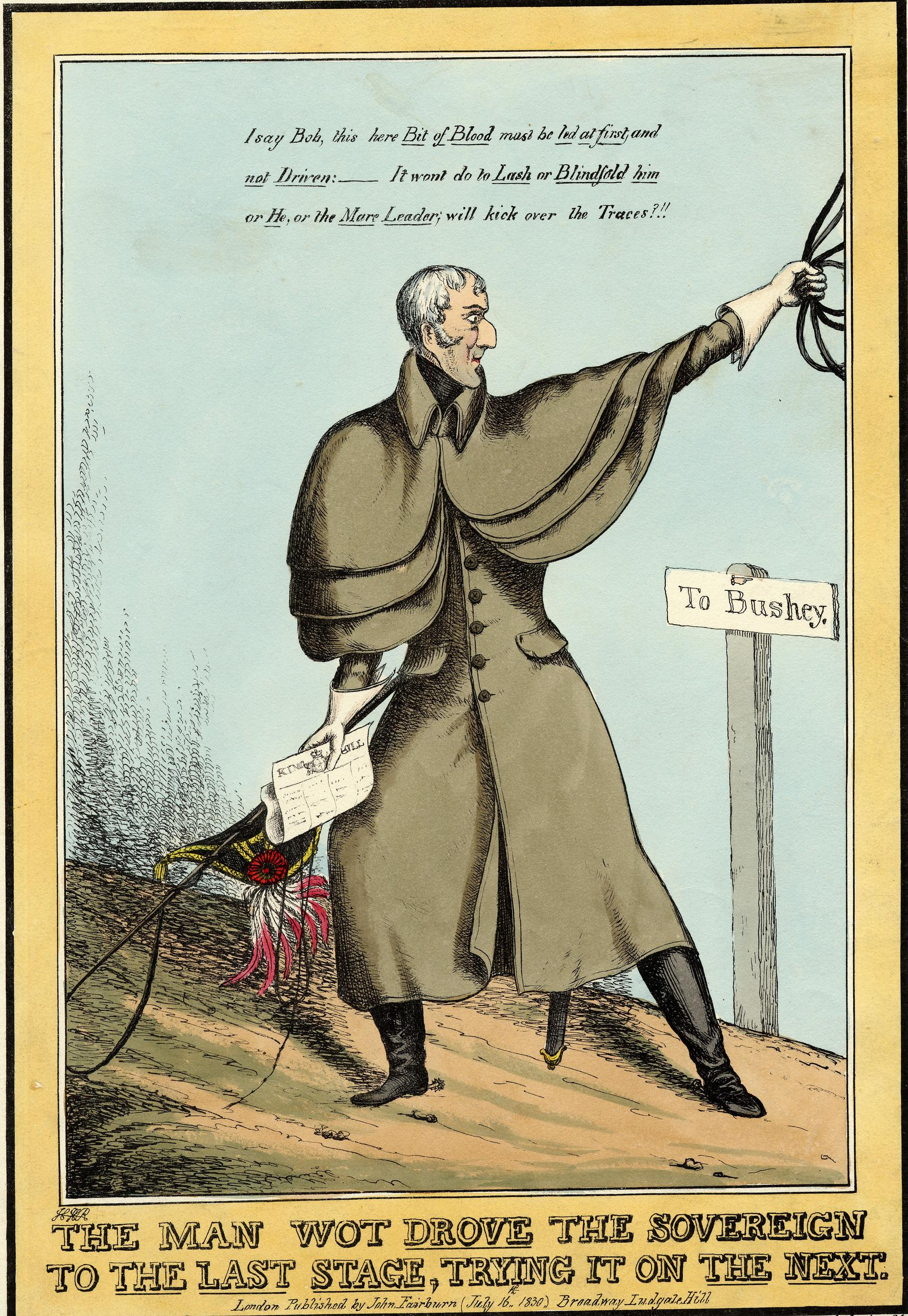
An 1830 caricature of the Duke of Wellington as a coachman.

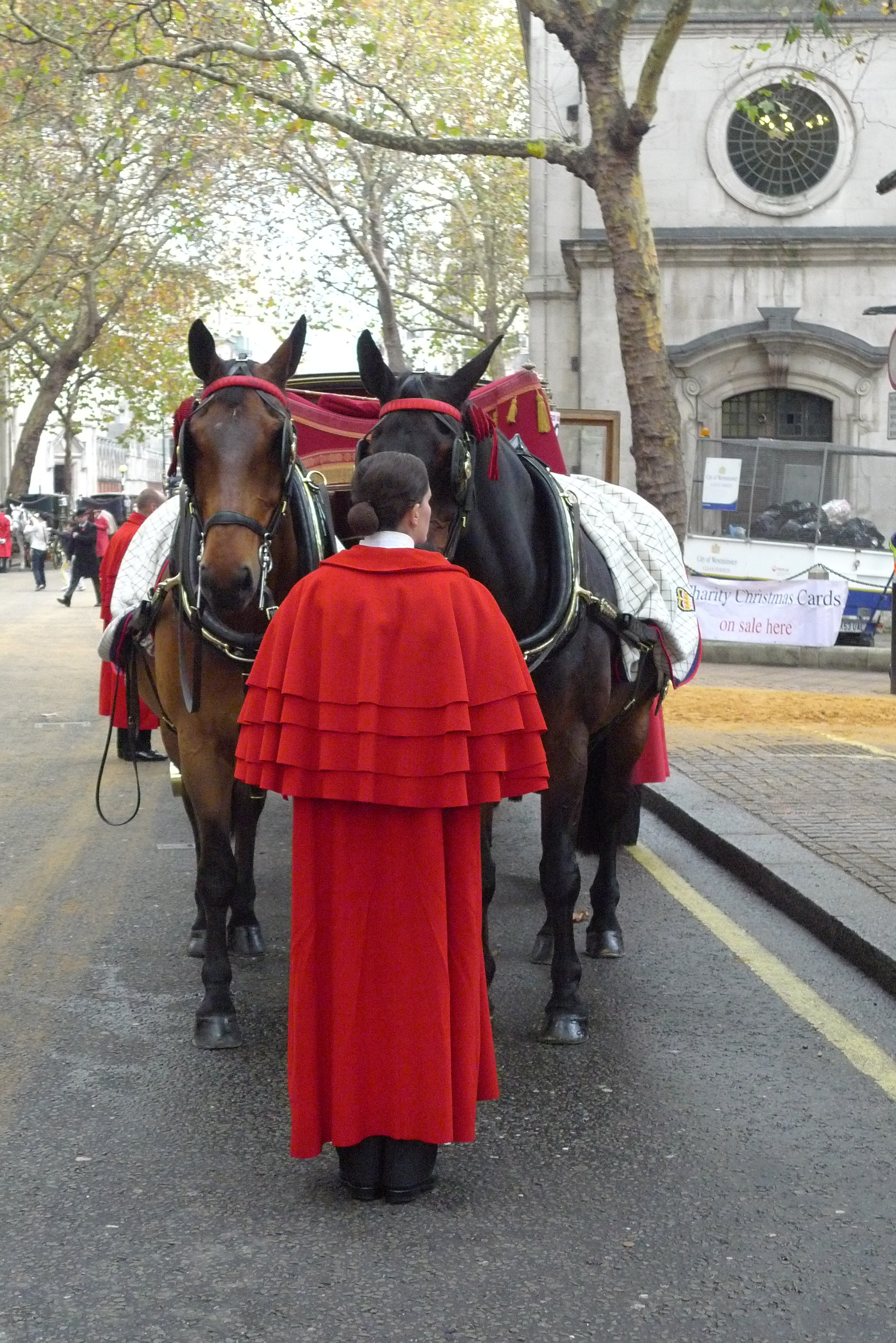
A coachwoman in London in 2011. She wears a multilayer cape.

Coachman's capes

The garment began in the 1850s as the Inverness coat, an outer coat with sleeves covered by a long cape, reaching the length of the sleeve. (Note: In comparison, the Ulster coat is similar, but the cape of an Ulster reaches only to the elbows.) By the 1870s, the cape was divided in two, and a small "capelet"-like "wing" on each side was sewn into the side seams, not taken across the back. In the 1880s, the sleeves were removed entirely, leaving only the armholes beneath the cape, to form the Inverness cape.

The fronts of the coat may be finished in either of two styles: in one, the more formal, the topcoat is finished with short lapels and the capes are set back behind them. In another style, there are no lapels. A simple fall collar with a tall stand is used, the capes buttoning across. These were also favored for less formal wear, particularly by coachmen and cab drivers, who needed free movement of their arms. Indeed, this style is usually called a "coachman's cape."

Still worn in the United Kingdom, the Inverness cape is often made of heavy Harris tweed of plaid and checked designs. The commonly held image of the cape as worn by Holmes is one made of tweed, specifically in a grey hound's tooth pattern. It is usually worn for country wear. Lighter-weight black cape-coats are associated with formal evening attire. Modest capes, made of Gore-Tex, nylon, or twill-weave fabrics and usually black, are commonly used by members of pipe bands.

== Highland dress ==
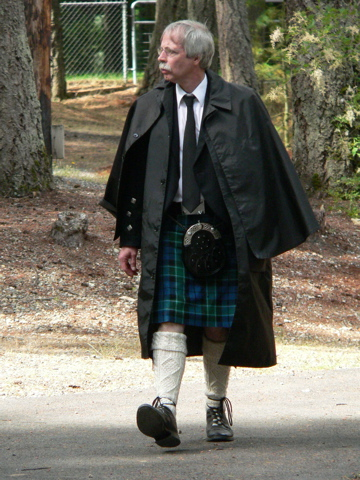
An Inverness cape worn with Highland dress, 2007 Tacoma Highland Games

Even though a wide variety of coats, overcoats, and rain gear are worn with Highland dress to deal with inclement weather, the Inverness cape has come to be almost universally adopted for rainy weather by pipe bands the world over, and many other kilt wearers also find it to be the preferable garment for such conditions. Unlike most raincoats or other conventional overcoats, the Inverness cape has no sleeves. Instead, it has wide-cut armholes in the sides to accommodate the arms. This enables the wearer to access a sporran without unbuttoning and opening up the cape. The opening in the side is covered by a short cape, which can be buttoned up in the front.

== In Japan ==
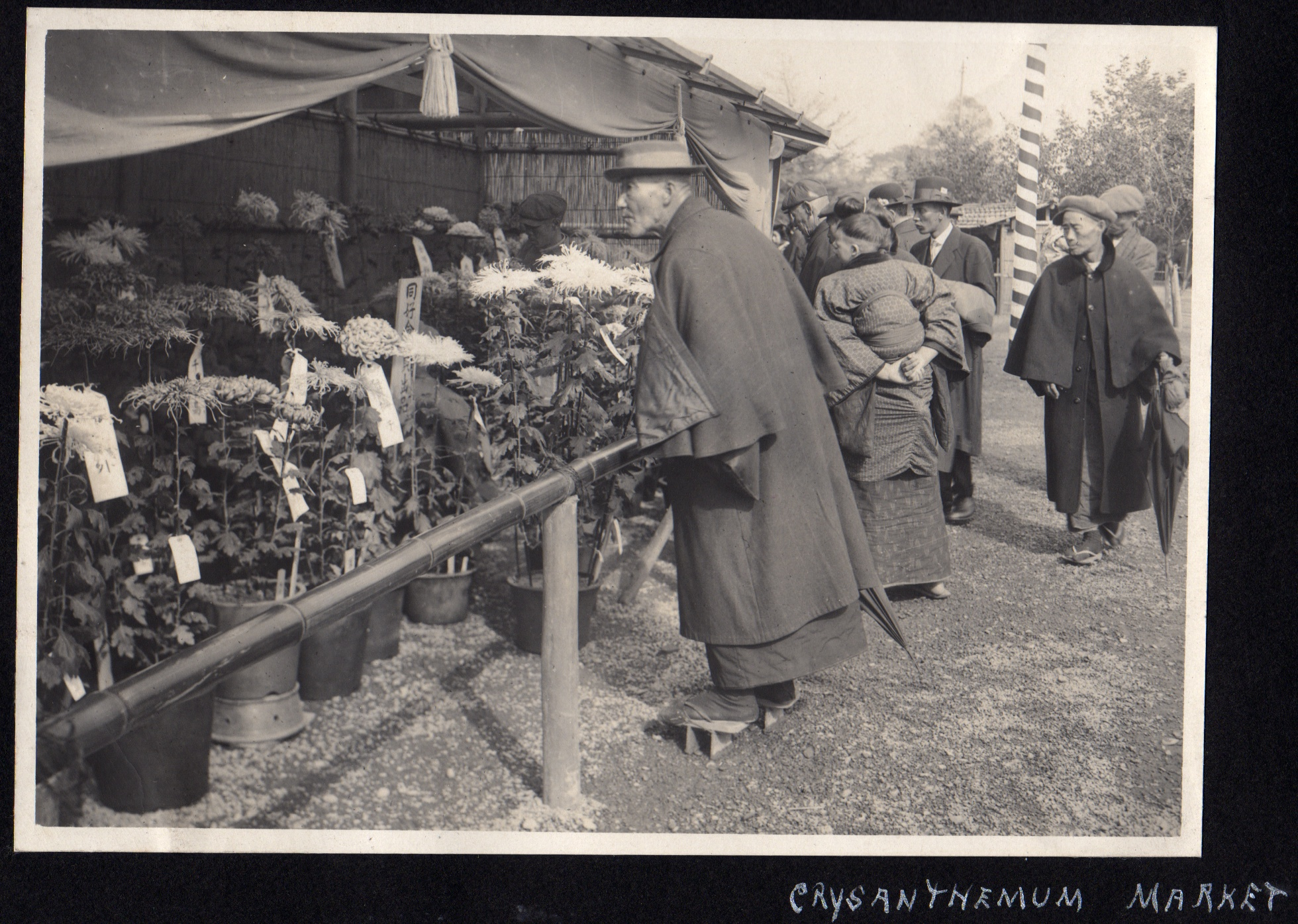
Men in the Inverness coat, Chrysanthemum Market in Japan, Taisho era (1914 by Elstner Hilton)

The Inverness coat was introduced into Japan during the Meiji era, and a modified version, the tonbi or tombi (とんび) coat, gained much popularity. The coat style was called tonbi because the flaps on either side of the shoulders looked similar to that of a kite. The tonbi could be worn over a kimono, which was a reason for its popularity. Historically, the use of wool was limited in Japan until the Meiji era; however, the increased demand for new overcoats which could be worn over the kimono, including the tonbi, ignited the market. The tonbi remained in common use as an overcoat worn by men during the Meiji, Taishō and Shōwa eras.

== In popular culture ==
=== Sherlock Holmes ===
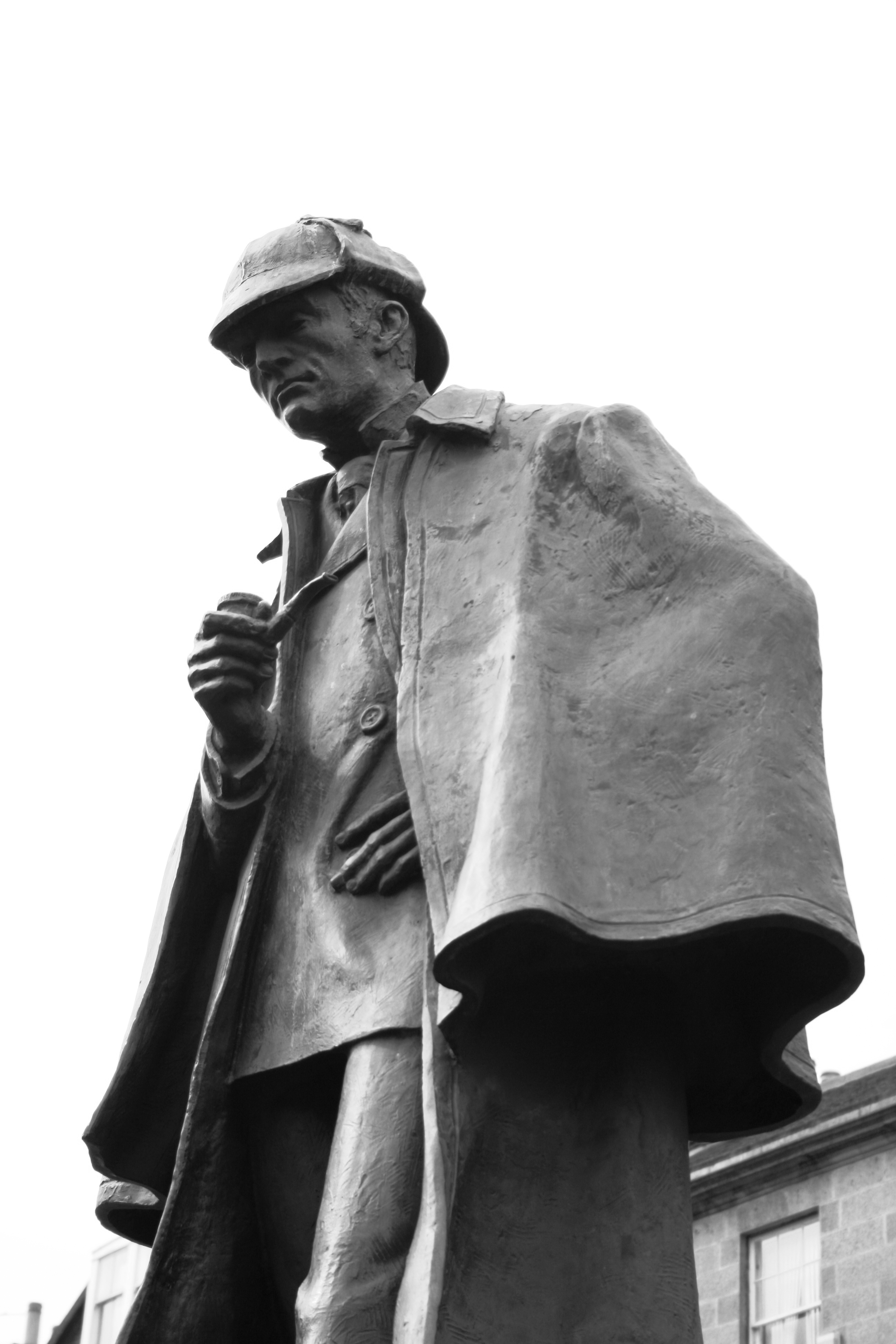
Statue of Sherlock Holmes in an Inverness cape and deerstalker, at Conan Doyle's birthplace in Edinburgh

Arguably the most famous example in fiction, Arthur Conan Doyle's famous detective Sherlock Holmes is often associated with the Inverness cape. However, in the novels, Holmes is described as wearing an Ulster. Holmes's distinctive look, which was usually complemented with a deerstalker cap and a calabash pipe, is a composite of images, originally credited to a series of illustrators including David Henry Friston and Sidney Paget. But as adapted to the stage by the actor-playwright William Gillette, Holmes did not wear a cape-coat at all, and the origin of the calabash pipe is something of a mystery, although it might have had something to do with Gillette's introduction of a full-bend briar pipe for his performances. Paget had depicted Holmes as smoking straight pipes, exclusively.

Friston, who illustrated the first published Sherlock Holmes novel of A Study in Scarlet, portrayed the character in a deerstalker-like hat and an elongated trench coat.

Be that as it might, the cape-coat, the deerstalker, and the calabash pipe were already associated with Holmes by the 1930s, chiefly in the United States, but the image became definitive with the first two films in which Basil Rathbone appeared on-screen as Holmes, produced for 20th Century Fox in 1939. (Note: In the Holmes short stories that were published in The Strand Magazine, Paget had depicted Holmes wearing a plaid Ulster, paired with a Bowler, not the deerstalker, in "The Musgrave Ritual" and "The Blue Carbuncle." In the text of "The Adventure of Silver Blaze" and "The Boscombe Valley Mystery", Holmes is not described as wearing an Inverness but a "long grey travelling cloak" depicted by Paget as an overcoat with a hood. See File:Sherlock Holmes Paget.jpg)

=== Other media ===
August Derleth's Solar Pons, essentially Sherlock Holmes with a different name and living in Praed Street in the 1920s, also wears an Inverness.

Inverness capes are worn by characters in many Western and Spaghetti Western films, such as Lee Van Cleef's character in For a Few Dollars More and Gianni Garko in the Sartana series.

In the 1970s of the long-running series Doctor Who, the Third Doctor (Jon Pertwee), frequently wore an Inverness cape over his dandy suits. Pertwee took credit for the Doctor's Edwardian appearance himself, having taken an Inverness cape from his own grandfather's wardrobe to complete the costume.

The vampire Barnabas Collins (as portrayed by actor Jonathan Frid) wore an Inverness cape on the 1966 cult classic Gothic soap opera Dark Shadows. The Inverness cape made a reappearance in the 2012 Tim Burton film remake, Dark Shadows (film). Costume designer Collen Atwood took inspiration from the original series, but "didn't want to do a boring black coat," so opted to update the costume with a "bottle-green fabric."

The 2001 film adaptation of the absurdist play Waiting for Godot has landlord Pozzo (played by Alan Stanford) wearing an Inverness cape, symbolising the Protestant Ascendancy landlords of Ireland.

Popular urban fantasy hero Harry Dresden of The Dresden Files by Jim Butcher replaced his trademark duster with an Inverness coat in Cold Days, the 14th book of the series.

Steampunk fashion has revived the wearing of the Inverness cape to a limited extent.

== See also ==
- Balmacaan
- Ulster coat
- Loden cape
- Duster (clothing)
- Trench coats
