= Hodden =

Coarse cloth of undyed wool

Hodden is a coarse, undyed cloth made of undyed wool, formerly much worn by the peasantry of Scotland from prehistory. Hodden, with wadmal, represent two similar cultural fabrics in Scottish history. Hodden is an early-modern period name for a primarily Gaelic fabric, earlier named lachdann in Gaelic, and even earlier lachtna in Old Irish; while wadmal was a Scandinavian fabric, in the now-Scottish islands and Highlands. Both are usually woven in 2/2 twill weave but are also known in plain or tabby weave. Both are a thick, coarse, fulled homespun cloth typically made of natural undyed wool of the vari-coloured Northern European short-tailed sheep breeds. The Scots preferred to breed strains of sheep in various areas to provide the local preferred colour of natural wool used for cloth to protect the poor and rural peasants from the elements.

For centuries, hodden (lachdann) kept Scottish peasants of Highland, Islands and Lowlands warm and dry. Hodden (lachdann) was common to all clans: a symbol of class and status mandated by Celtic and Gaelic custom and Scottish law from prehistory until 1698. The earliest known samples of Celtic cloth come from the Hallstatt salt mines of Austria, date from 800 to 600 BCE, and are principally single colour natural wool cloth brightened by decorative bands of dyed wool added to cuffs and necklines.

The Gaels invaded Scotland from Ireland in the 4th – 5th century CE. They brought with them their oral customs and traditions, fortunately written down by Christian monks in the 8th century, as the Brehon Laws including the Senchus Mor, a tract on status. Natural coloured vegetable and animal fibres, generally called lachtna in the Old Irish of the Senchus Mor and lachdann in the later Gaelic, became the Gaelic dress codes for the common people. After Scottish independence, these early dress customs or codes requiring the common people to wear undyed cloth were then enacted in medieval Scottish law in 1458. These dress laws were repealed in 1698. Only then could the common Scot wear modern, dyed tartan legally.

The term hodden appears In Lowland Scots in the 16th century, replacing lachdann, which remained in use in the Highlands. Homespun hodden’s use declined in the 18th century. Hodden, as a manufactured fabric, declined in the early 19th century. Resurrection in the form of a tweed mixture cloth came in 1859 on its selection by the Commanding Officer of the London Scottish Rifle Volunteers (LSRV). Progressively darker over time, hodden grey is still worn by the Toronto Scottish Regiment (Queen Elizabeth the Queen Mother’s Own) as their ceremonial uniform.

== An ancient cloth ==
=== Ancient roots ===
Gaelic and Brythonic custom dating back into prehistory required the Celtic peasant class to wear undyed clothing. The ancient proto-Celtic culture was very status conscious, continuing concepts of the Indo-European peoples that migrated from the Middle East to Europe in the third millennium BCE. The Celtic culture migrated to the British Isles about 500 BCE and the Proto-Celtic culture much earlier. The Gaels and Britons of the British Isles shared a common language and culture at some point.

Gaelic (Goidelic) ‘breacan’ and the Welsh (Brythonic) ‘brychan’ both describe a cloth or garment that is ‘flecked, mottled, speckled or piebald’. The breacan / brychan was a winter or foul weather garment for gentry, nobility and royalty in both cultures in addition to general purpose clothing for the peasantry. The root word is breac describing a trout, salmon-trout or salmon but now has acquired an association with chequered (two colours) and the sett (more than two colours) of modern tartan. The similarity of the word and meaning infers that there was a common ancestor in prehistory before the Goidelic / Brythonic split of the Insular Celtic languages.

=== Vari-coloured wool and Scottish clothing ===
Prior to the industrial revolution, homespun fabrics, were cheaply made of necessity because of the time constraint of the process combined with the uncertainty of what, and how much colour, would be attained from the few sheep permitted to be raised by a peasant. Spinning and weaving wool for clothes, blankets, rugs, etc. was just part of the daily domestic routine, usually made on small hand-looms by the peasants.

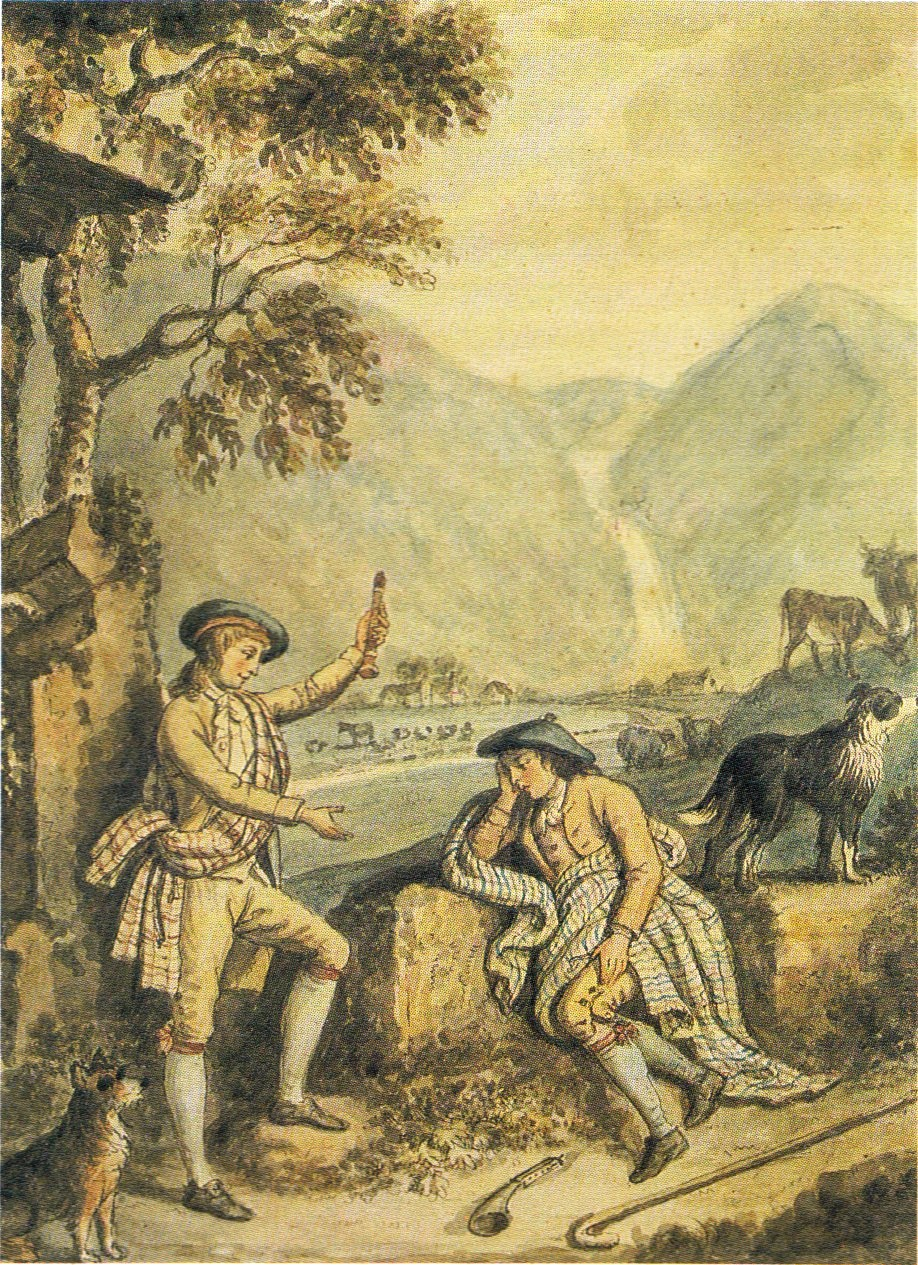
The 'Craigy Bield' by David Allan (1788). The opening scene of The Gentle Shepherd (1725) showing two Scots shepherds in their clothes of hodden grey or lachdann.

The better qualities of hodden (lachdann) or wadmal could be made of selected white wool and dyed or selected natural colours spun into single coloured yarn, but this was a time-consuming and expensive process in a domestic craft economy that existed into the 14th century in England and Wales, and even later in Scotland. Peasant fabrics were much coarser than those for the gentry and their retinue, made of materials at hand, and mixing whatever natural colours were at hand into multi-coloured (mixture) yarn. The resultant overall colour commonly became a shade of beige or grey – in Victorian times described as the range of warm and cold greys.

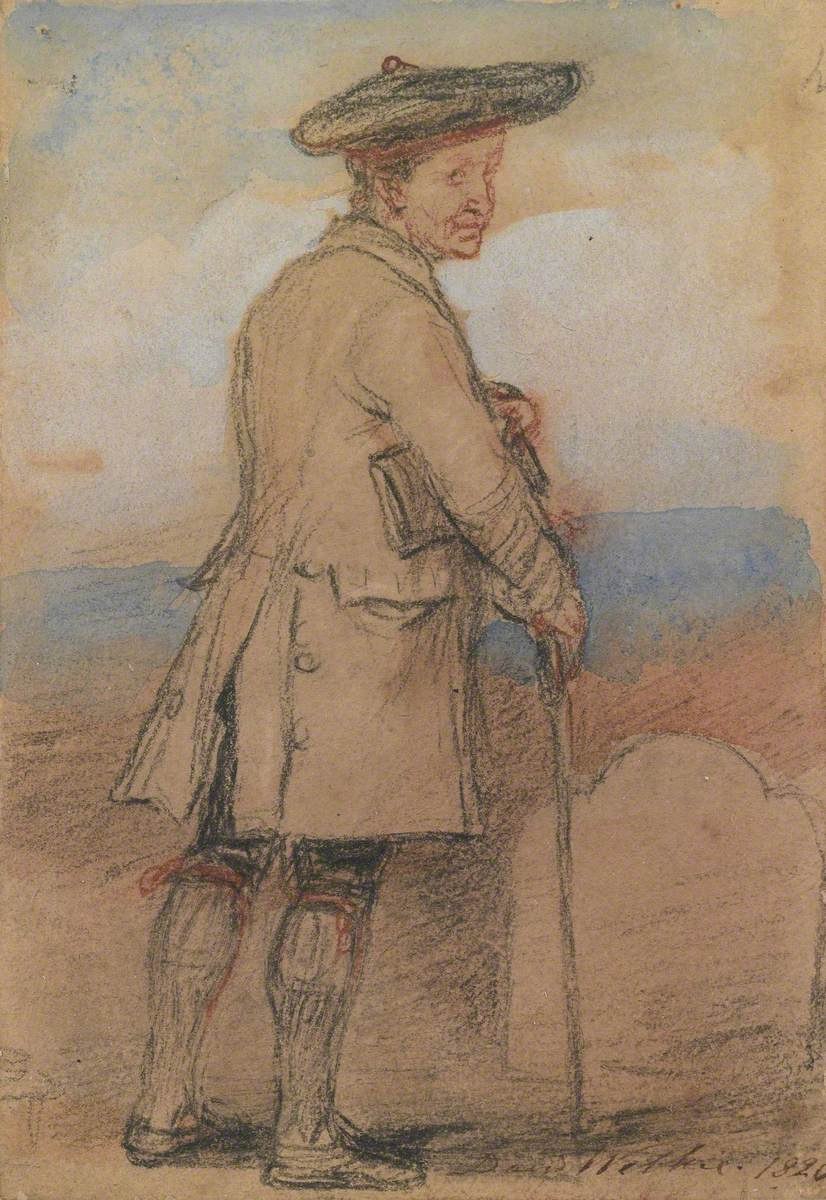
Study for 'Old Mortality' by David Wilkie (1820) showing him dressed in his typical hodden grey clothes.

The various wool colours were often mixed roughly, spun and then woven into a plaiding cloth (used for a garment called a breacan in Gaelic or plaid in Scots) that became notable for its crude, irregular appearance showing speckles, mottles, flecks with a light brownish colour or a yellowy brown colour. A modern description would be a mixture cloth. In Gaelic, this version was lachdann (light tan / dun). The important Scottish artists David Allan and Sir David Wilkie painted this version of hodden, now called hodden grey. Note that these are a yellowy brown not grey in the modern sense. These are clothes suitable for outdoors use: warm, windproof, and water-resistant.

The more commonly quoted formula for hodden grey - made by mixing black and white fleeces together in the proportion of one to twelve when weaving - gives a smokey grey that was more expensive and becomes fashionable much later with greater availability of white wool from improved sheep breeds. This later version of hodden grey was more elegant and became servant or retinue attire on a Lowland laird’s estate in the 18th and 19th centuries.

The Scottish archaeological record for peasant clothing is sparse. The main finds (Dava Moor, Morayshire; Barrock, Caithness; Gunnister, Shetland; and Arnish Moor, Lewis) date roughly from the period 1675 to 1725. All are tattered, solid-coloured clothing showing their age and hard use.

== Celtic custom becomes Scottish law ==
=== British and Gaelic custom ===
There is a long trail of custom and law for Scottish dress codes mandating the undyed cloth of lachdann and hodden for the common people.

The Britons and Caledones had a dress code that was poorly documented in early literature. The Molmutine Laws of Dyfnwal Moelmud, King of Cymry (450-470 CE) were confirmed by Hywel Dda, King of Dyfed, Powys and Gwynedd (942 – 950 CE). The specifics of the Welsh dress code are missing but that dress was an integral part of the station (privilege / status) of a man. That British laws of status were in use early on can be shown by the legend of the Welsh Thirteen Treasures of the island of Britain, written in the 8th century, of the magical red cloak of Padarn Beisrudd (supposed grandfather of Cunedda (c. 600 CE), a war leader of the Britons against the Angles). “If a well-born man put it on, it would be the right size for him; if a churl (a peasant), it would not go upon him.”

The invading Gaels brought with them the Brehon Laws including the Senchus Mor, a tract on status. The presumed earliest peasant dress code (possibly 5th or 6th century CE) in the Senchus Mor states for sons in fosterage of other families:

"Black, and yellowish, and grey, and blay (OED: pale, pallid, wan, lacking in colour. Old Irish: lachtna) clothes are to be worn by the sons of the Feini (the common people) grades."

The common people – the poor and rural peasants, artisans and lesser tenant farmers – probably formed 85% of the Scottish population into the late 17th century.

A later quote, presumably 8th century, reads:

"Clothes … - according to the rank of each man, from the humblest to the king, is the clothing of the son. Blay-coloured and yellow, and black, and white clothes are to be worn by sons of inferior grades; …".

This custom of associating low status with the colours grey and white is referred to in the Laws of the Four Burghs in the reign of King David 1 (1124 – 1153). One law was that a man forced by poverty to dispose of his inheritance of land was to wear grey or white clothes reflecting his new lowered status.

=== Scottish law ===
As the Scottish royalty and nobility during the Wars of Independence (1296-1357) predominately had Anglo-Norman ancestry, values, and possessions (Bruces, Comyns, Balliols, all had lands in northern England and Scotland) the early English dress code (37 Edw. 3. c. 14) of 1363 for ‘People of little Means’ would have applied:

"Carters, Ploughmen, Drivers of the Plough, Oxherds, Cowherds, Shepherds, Dairymen, and all other Keepers of Beasts, Threshers of Corn, and all Manner of People of the Estate of a Groom, attending to Husbandry, and all other People that have not 40s of Goods or Chattels shall not wear any manner of Cloth but Blanket (grey) and Russet Wool of 12d. and will wear Girdles of Linen according to their estate."

After independence, these early dress customs or codes were then enacted in medieval Scottish law in 1458:

"No labourers or husbands wear any colour except grey or white on workdays and on holy days only light blue, green and red."

Whether the common Highlander disobeyed these dress codes, and could afford tartan of the modern definition, is dubious. As tartan was a symbol of social standing, the upper classes, who operated the justice system, would penalize any imposter or usurper. To date, no bog body evidence contradicts this statement. As to cost, the Baron Court of Breadalbane of 11 January 1622 fixed the maximum charge for weaving cloth in barter terms. The price of plain grey cloth was to be two pence and one lippie of meal per ell, while tartan was priced at 4 pence plus 1 peck, two lippies of meal per ell - more than twice the cost of grey cloth. Few common Highlanders or Lowlanders could afford to disobey the dress codes.

These sumptuary laws were repealed in 1698, after which all Scots could wear modern tartan if they could afford the expense. Not many could, so homespun hodden continued as typical rustic’s dress into the early 19th century.

=== The District Colours of Hodden ===
The various peoples that settled in northern Britain in the period 1000 BCE to 1000 CE brought with them their animals, in this discussion their sheep and their natural colours of wool. The native Caledonians had the Soay; the Gaels the ancestor of the Cladagh; the Scandinavians the Old Norwegian Sheep and the Anglo-Saxons the Heidschnucke. These were all breeds of the Northern European vari-coloured short-tailed sheep family. Over time, the interbreeding produced a dominant, but now extinct, vari-coloured breed called the Scottish Dunface whose closest descendant is believed to be the Shetland sheep. From this sheep, many clusters of different colours determined the district colour of the peasantry.

James Anderson (1793), a noted sheep expert of the time, commented on the necessity for sheep breeds to produce those mandated undyed wool colours. Anderson summarized the association of Scottish sheep, colour, and peasant dress in the Highlands as:

"In all remote parts of Scotland, where sheep have been in a great measure neglected, and allowed to breed promiscuously, without any selection, there is to be found a prodigious diversity of colours: and, among others, dun sheep. Or those of a brownish colour, tending to an obscure yellow, are not infrequent … When any variety of these sheep becomes a favourite with a particular person, those of that colour are selected to breed from; and in this way it frequently happens that those of one colour begin to predominate in one place more than another. It is for this reason, and to save the trouble of dyeing; that these poor people in the Highlands propagate black, and russet, and brown and other coloured sheep, more than in any country where the wool is regularly brought to market. In the Isle of Man, a breed of dun sheep is very common till this hour."

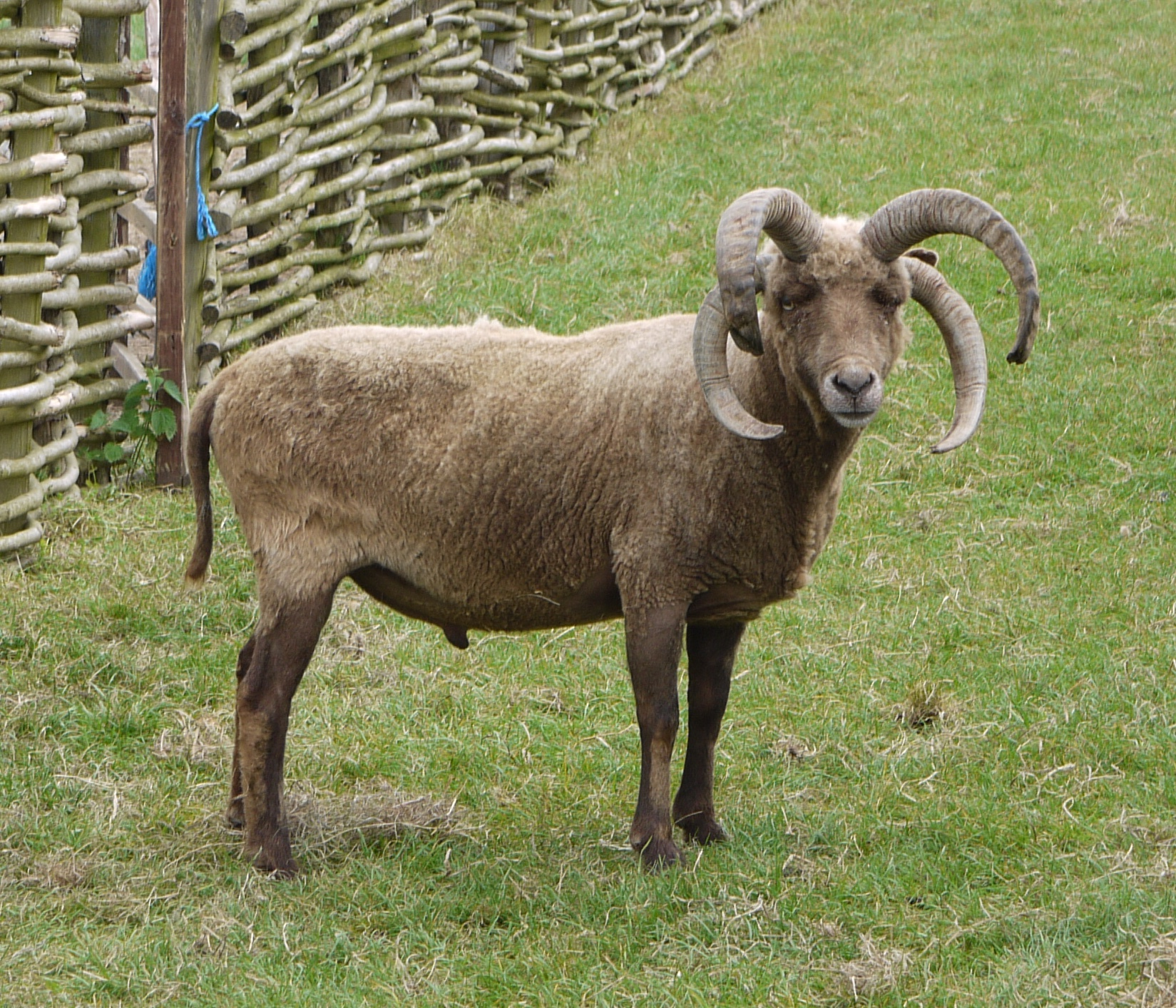
Manx Loaghtan sheep from Butser Ancient Farm showing the loaghtan / lachdann / light tan / dun colour of the fleece.

The result of this cultural practice is the large number of rare breeds of sheep found in Scotland today. The Northern European short-tailed sheep are believed to have been introduced with the first farmers to northern Europe in the Neolithic Age.

For comparison to Anderson and written 40 years later, James Logan (1831), wrote in The Scottish Gael:

"Throughout Scotland, more particularly in the Northern Highlands, the cloth was made of the undyed wool, the white and black being generally appropriated for blankets, or plaids, and for the upper garments, the gray for hose and mits for the gudeman. The hodden gray was the general attire among the farmers, as it still, in most parts of the interior and in Ireland, continues to be."

Logan’s account reflects the rapid extermination of the native multi-coloured sheep in the late 1700s in the Highlands and the rapid introduction of ‘improved’ white woolled sheep as replacements noted in the First Statistical Account of Scotland (1790 - 1799) by 1831. Hence, the established Lowland preference for grey colour being attributed with the Highlands in 1831. Hodden’s use declined with the general eradication of the peasant’s vari-coloured short-tailed sheep breeds in Scotland in favour of improved breeds of long-tailed sheep in the mid to late 18th century. These improved breeds produced mainly white wool which could be dyed effectively and hence was more valuable. Dye, whether natural or synthetic, does not permanently alter the colour of naturally pigmented wool.

That James Anderson could observe that the ancient Scottish customs and laws were still being abided in 1793, and a line in William Tennant’s poem Anster Fair (1812): “Tenant and Laird, and hedger hodden-clad”, – both a century after repeal – shows the ubiquity of hodden in Scottish society.

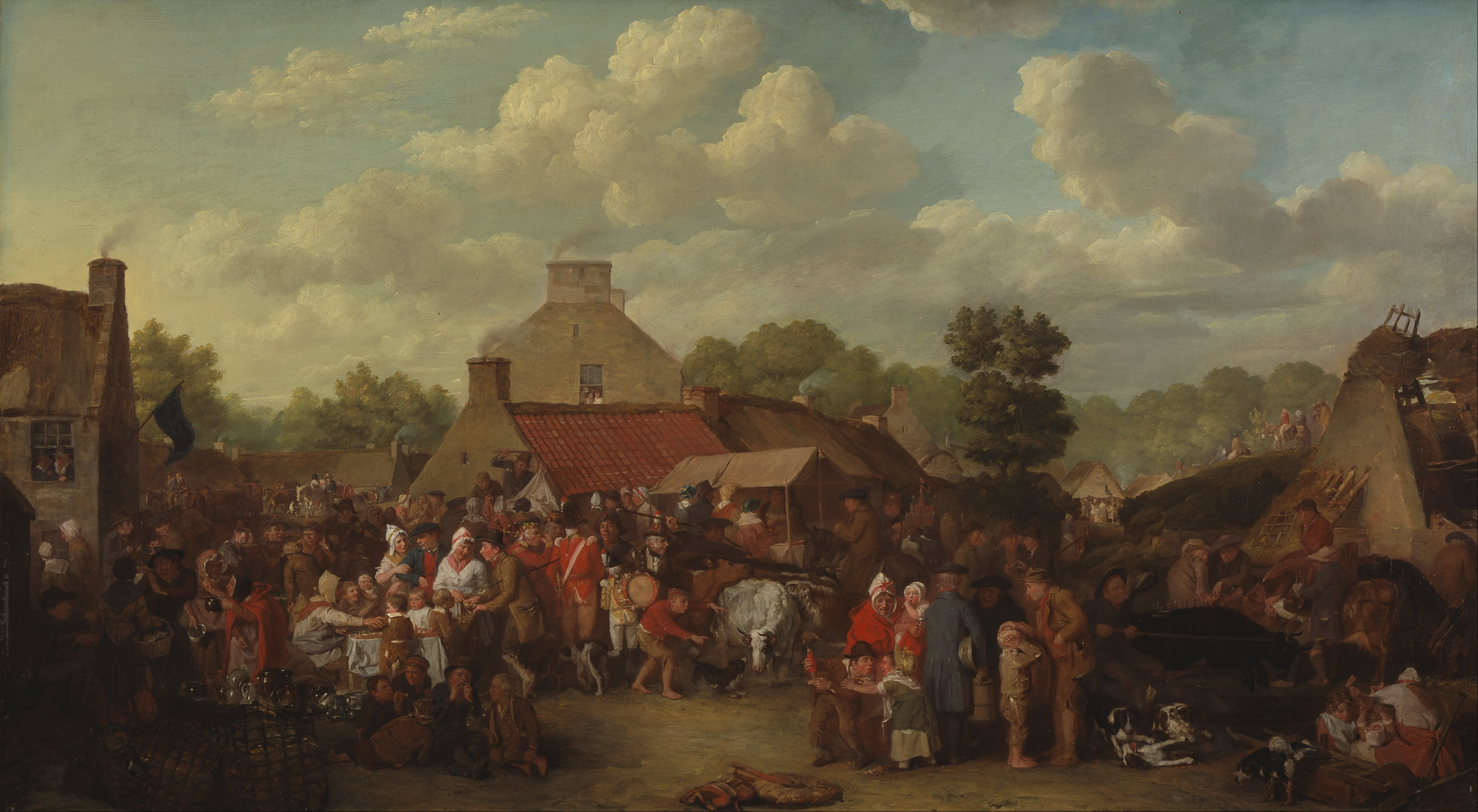
Pitlessie Fair (1804) by David Wilkie. The people attending the market are generally dressed in hodden with almost no tartan. Pitlessie is near Anstuther ('Anster'), Fife.

== The origin of the word ‘hodden’ ==
There is no definitive origin for the word ‘hodden’. The term appears in the Scots language (especially in the north-east) and northern England in the late 16th century. Previously, the cloth had been called lachdann in Gaelic. The Statutes of Iona (1609) and the Privy Council Acts (1616) promoted the Scots language that forced the Anglicized word hodden to replace the Gaelic lachdann. There are two possible origins.

First, the term is believed to be a loan word into the Scots language from Old Frisian / Mid-Dutch hoed-en (= guard, protect) and Low German houd-en. Hodden, as a plaiding cloth, was a cheap domestic and export cloth that would have been used to protect both Scottish and Flemish peasants from the cold and wet since the 15th century. The introduction timing suggests a loan word adopted and brought back by English and Scottish mercenaries employed in the Low Countries who used the Frisian / Dutch word for the export cloth lachdann sold in Flanders.

The second possible origin is from English into Scots dialect; ‘hidden’ converts to ‘hodden’ In Scots reflecting its changeable hue in varying light – a characteristic also in common with the Low Countries hoed-en / huod-en.

The first use of the word hodden in Scottish literature is 1579. The phrase ‘hodding grey’ is first used in 1586 but seems to have been commonly used after 1705. The term becomes popular within and without Scotland through Allan Ramsay in his play The Gentle Shepherd (1725). Robert Burns’ A Man’s a Man for all That (1795) is the most quoted modern use:

What though on hamely fare we dine,
Wear hodden grey, an' a that;
Gie fools their silks, and knaves their wine;
A Man's a Man for a' that."

Sir Walter Scott’s Old Mortality (1816) and Charlotte Bronte’s Villette (1853), with childhood reminisces set in Yorkshire, also demonstrated its use in Scotland and northern England into the 19th century and perpetuated the cloth’s memory.

== Modern Perpetuation ==
=== Rediscovery ===
The industrial revolution in spinning and weaving, combined with improved sheep breeds producing significantly increased white-wool availability, made homespun hodden uneconomical. By 1820, vari-coloured sheep had been eradicated except in remote Scottish islands. Homespun hodden became replaced by a manufactured mixture cloth.

A quick history of the modern rediscovery and development of hodden grey starts with the invasion scare / panic of 1859 that made obvious the need for a substantial home defense force to supplement the regular British army and militia. Francis Charteris, Lord Elcho, MP was one of the major proponents of the new Volunteer Force and the National Rifle Association. He argued for changes to the standard army drill and uniform for the Volunteers because of military technological change. Lord Elcho was elected Commanding Officer of the London Scottish Rifle Volunteers (LSRV) in 1859 and he selected an ashy grey tweed material (soon named hodden grey) for the loose-fitting shooting apparel of the regiment’s uniform as well as successfully promoting the colour for the standard uniform for the Volunteers. Hodden’s neutral and changeable colour was useful as camouflage. The Volunteers were conceived as skirmishers, not line infantry, and inconspicuousness combined with accurate long-range musketry and rapid movement was necessary for this role. As Lord Elcho said, “A soldier is a man-hunter, neither more nor less, and as a deer-stalker uses the least visible of colours so ought the soldier to be clad”. All ranks were to buy their own uniform, so it had to be inexpensive, hard-wearing, and clothing that you could use in daily life in London. Hodden grey tweed was ideal for the knickerbockers that he originally proposed.

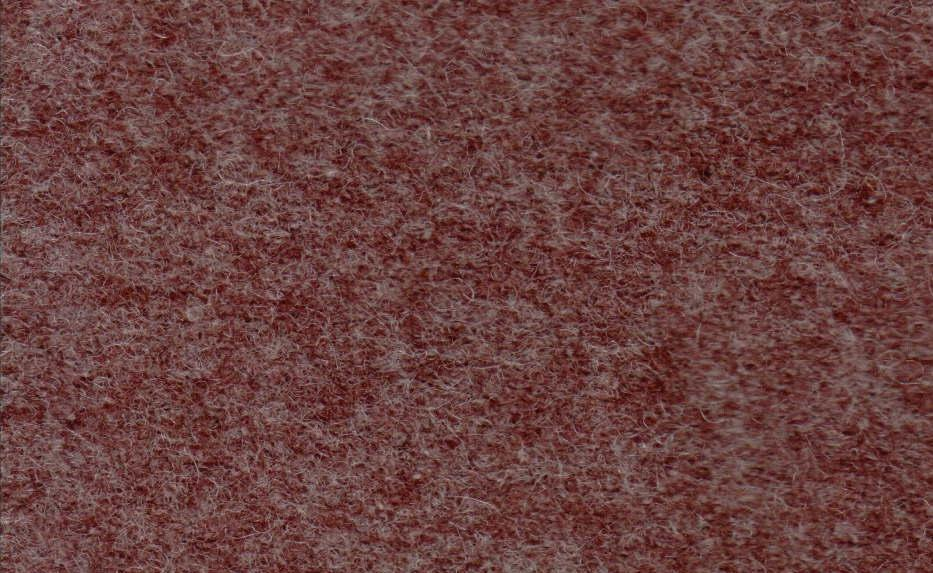
London Scottish 1895 pattern hodden grey

However, the Volunteer Force of Napoleonic War had been issued scarlet tunics and made to look like regular army units. These uniforms had been subsidized by government and patriotic societies not the individuals. The members of the 1859 Volunteer Force desired the image of the ‘Thin Red Line’ of the Crimean War, echoing the Napoleonic War glories, through the issuance of scarlet tunics for battledress. Again, Lord Elcho objected: “… of all the God-forsaken dress for soldiers red coats with white pipeclay belts was the most so; a better target no marksman can wish for than men thus clothed”. This aspiration was to continue until issuance of khaki / drab in 1902 as battledress for the entire British army. In this period, the LSRV and its descendants, commonly titled the London Scottish, progressively switched to darker versions of hodden, such as the 1895 pattern Elcho grey of a claret-brown and white wool mixture shown here, as field trials demonstrated better variants suitable to modern warfare in Europe. The hard-wearing original tweed construction suitable for trousers or knickerbockers soon became a softer and more elegant serge cloth. In time the London Scottish version of hodden, also adopted by other Volunteer Scottish regiments. Over time, the terms ‘Elcho’ and ‘Hodden Grey’ became interchangeable.

=== Hodden today ===
Two military regiments wore Elcho (hodden) grey in modern times; The London Scottish Regiment and The Toronto Scottish Regiment. In 2022, ‘A’ Company (London Scottish) The London Regiment - the descendant of the LSRV and the London Scottish Regiment – was redesignated as ‘G’ (Messines) Company, Scots Guards, 1st Battalion London Guards Regiment and no longer wears Elcho (hodden) grey. The Toronto Scottish chose to adopt the London Scottish uniform with Canadian distinctions in 1921 since the wartime exploits and reputation of the London Scottish in WW1 were legendary. The Toronto Scottish Regiment (Queen Elizabeth the Queen Mother’s Own) is now the sole active wearer of Elcho (hodden) grey.

Other cultures have produced similar woollen fabrics to hodden but are known by different names. Loden is still worn in Austria, Germany, and Italy. Duffel was produced in Belgium and became very popular in the United Kingdom. Melton is still produced as overcoat material in the United Kingdom.

== See also ==
- Wadmal
- Loden cape
- Duffel coat
- Melton (cloth)
