= Cape =

Sleeveless outer garment of varying lengths, sometimes attached to a coat

A cape is a clothing accessory or a sleeveless outer garment of any length that hangs loosely and connects either at the neck or shoulders. They usually cover the back, shoulders, and arms. They come in a variety of styles and have been used throughout history for many different reasons.

== Semantic distinction ==
In fashion, the word "cape" usually refers to a shorter garment and "cloak" to a full-length version of the different types of garment, though the two terms are sometimes used synonymously for full-length coverings. A shoulder cape is thus sometimes called a "capelet". The fashion cape does not cover the front to any appreciable degree. In rain gear, a cape is usually a long and roomy protective garment worn to keep one dry in the rain.

== History ==
The first usage of capes is unknown, but some early references known are from Ancient Roman military uniforms. Later on, capes were common in medieval Europe, especially when combined with a hood in the chaperon. They have had periodic returns to fashion – for example, in nineteenth-century Europe. Catholic clergy wear a type of cape known as a ferraiolo, which is worn for formal events outside a ritualistic context. The cope is a liturgical vestment in the form of a cape. By the Victorian Era capes were seen as a fashion staple for women such as Queen Elizabeth I. Less of a necessity and more as a way to show status and style. Capes are often highly decorated with elaborate embroidery. Capes remain in regular use as rainwear in various military units and police forces, in France for example. A gas cape was a protective military garment issued alongside gas masks in twentieth-century wars, designed to shield soldiers from liquid chemical agents and contaminated terrain.

Rich noblemen and elite warriors of the Aztec Empire would wear a tilmàtli; a Mesoamerican cloak/cape used as a symbol of their upper status. Cloth and clothing was of utmost importance to the Aztecs. The more elaborate and colorful tilmàtlis were strictly reserved for elite high priests, emperors; and the eagle warriors as well as jaguar warriors.

== In formal wear ==
In full evening dress, ladies frequently use the cape as a fashion statement, or to protect the wearer or the fine fabrics of their evening-wear from the elements, especially where a coat would crush—or hide—the garment. These capes may be short (over the shoulders or to the waist) or a full-length cloak. Short capes were usually made of, or trimmed in, fur; however, because fur is less accepted as a fashion accessory in modern times, other expensive materials are substituted for it, with an opulent lining and trim. Typical fabrics used are velvet, silk, and satin. Capes are still authorized as an alternative to the more utilitarian trench coat for U.S. Army officers in mess dress, formal evening uniform. The same can go for Police officers to protect them from weather conditions while on the job.

== The caped overcoat variant ==
Caped overcoats were popular for men during the Victorian era, with some caped Ulsters featuring multiple layered capes, and the Inverness coat (both formal evening and working day variants) had a cape. The Inverness coat is no longer commonly worn (though it has begun to be revived, on a limited scale, in steampunk fashion), and the Ulster lost its cape in the 1920s.

== As protection ==
In modern times, capes are commonly used by hair and beauty salons for the purpose of hair styling services, in which usage they protect clothing from loose strands of hair being cut from the head or from the chemicals often used in such styling.

== In fiction ==
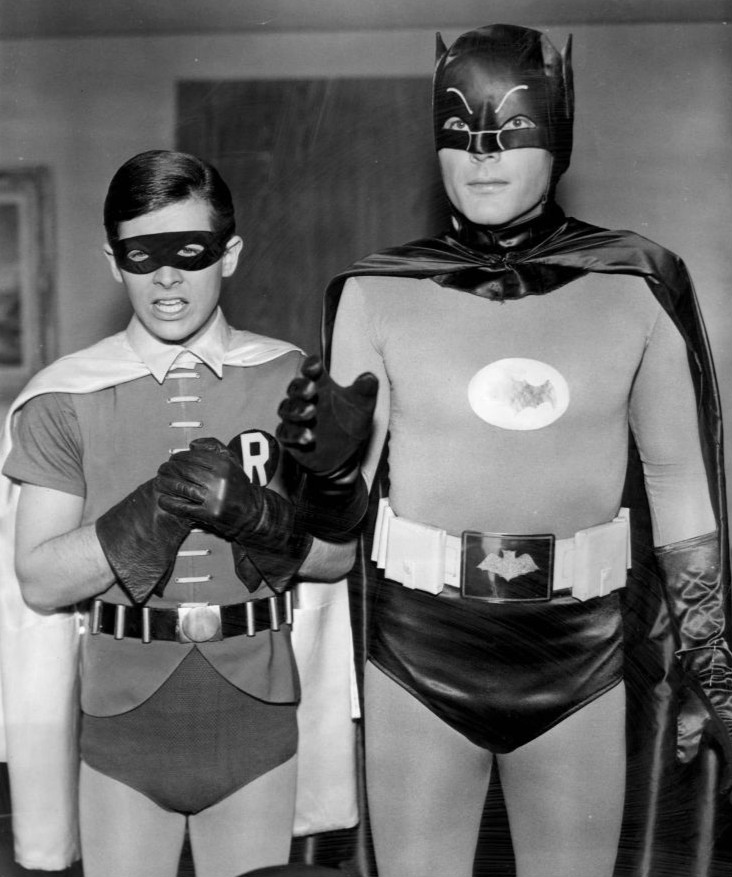
Batman and Robin

The cape is a symbol for superheroes in the American comic book genre. They are often used by comic book artists to create the illusion of motion in a still image. Most often, they are worn by heroes like Superman merely as a costume adornment. Other times, as in the case of Batman, Shroud, Cloak, and Doctor Strange, the cape serves a functional purpose, with Batman's cape allowing him to glide, and Cloak and the Shroud's capes enhancing their ability to teleport via the Darkforce. Spawn has a cape (actually a part of his living symbiotic costume) that obeys Spawn's mental commands, changing shape to scare, confuse or even kill would-be attackers, while Meta Knight of the Kirby franchise disguises his wings as a cape. Some media, such as Watchmen, The Incredibles, and Spider-Man: Into the Spider-Verse, comment on the potentially lethal hazards of a cape.

== In religious contexts ==
In some ultra-Orthodox Jewish communities, capes have become a symbol of stringent modesty norms. Wearing capes developed as a way for ultra-Orthodox women to express their spiritual devotion and demonstrate a higher level of modesty. This trend gained traction in Israel, particularly within the Toldot Aharon sect, where it was initially encouraged by religious leaders as a form of spiritual striving. Some women believe that wearing a cape brings divine protection and blessings, including fertility and health benefits.

== Gallery ==
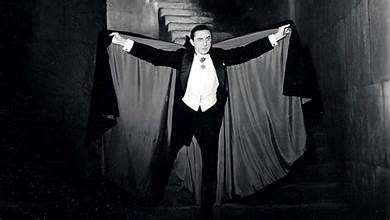
Bela Lugosi as seen in Dracula (1931) sporting a cape.

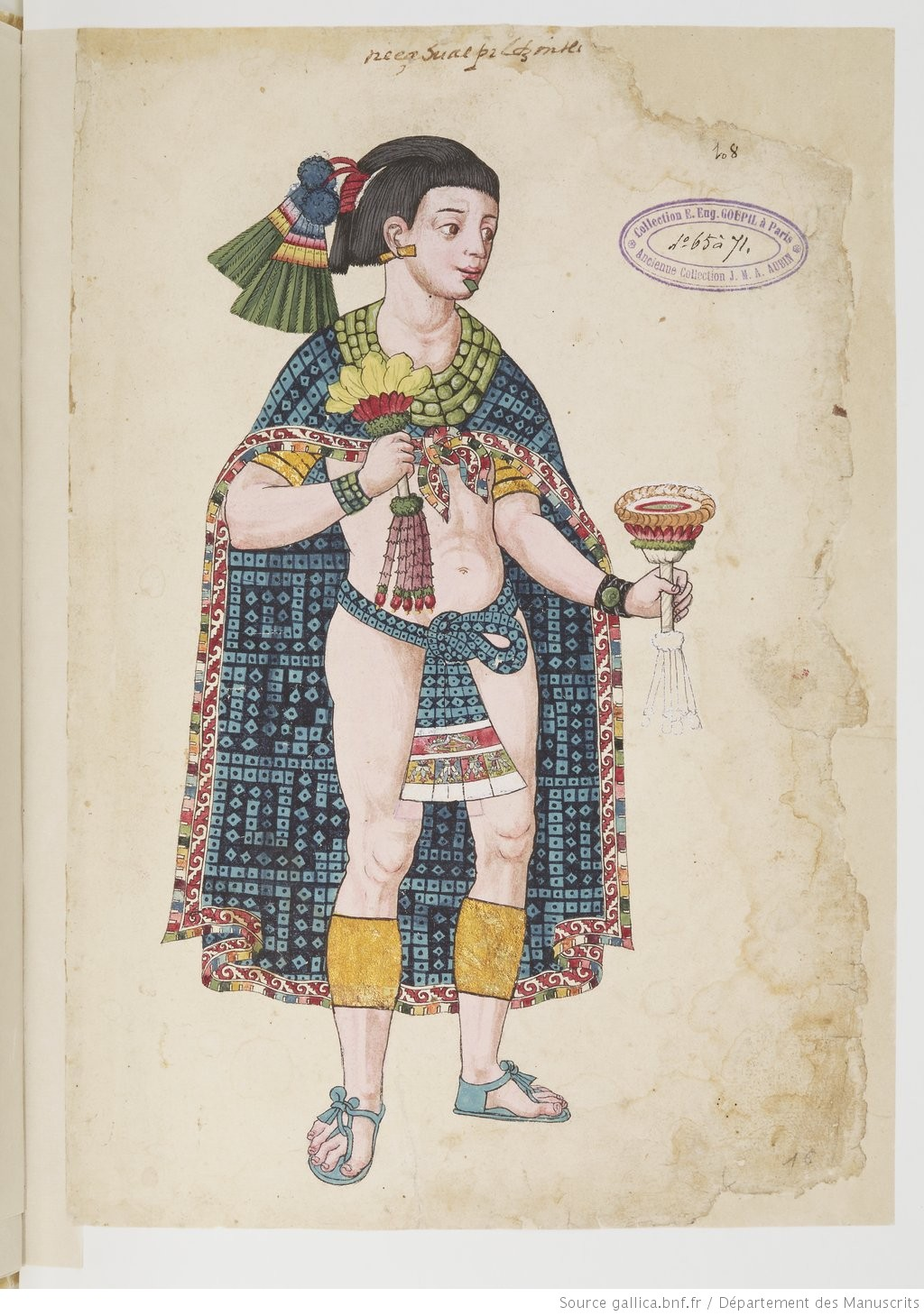
Tlatoani Nezahualpiltzintli; Aztec king of Texcoco wearing a Mesoamerican cape

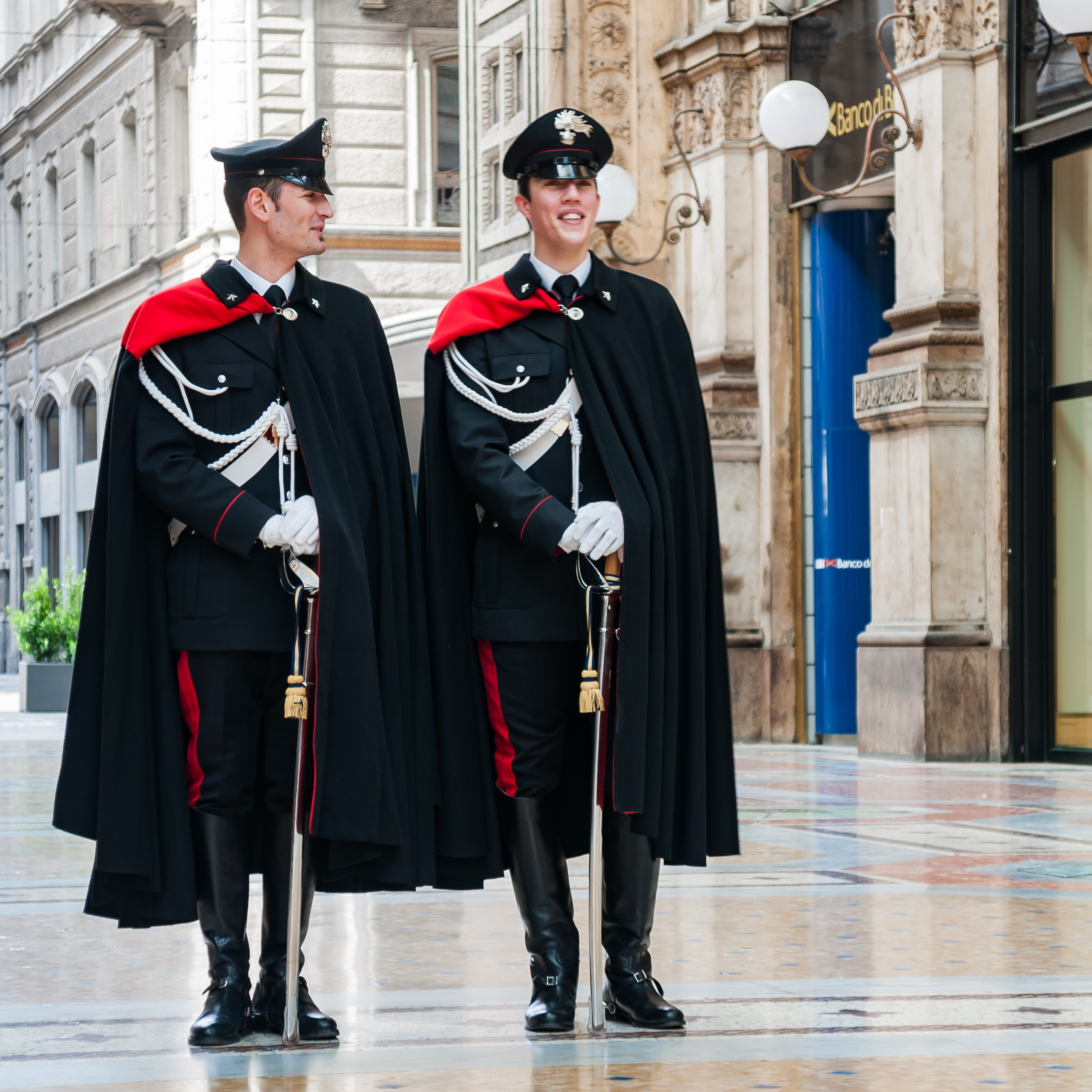
Two Italian carabinieri (gendarmes) with capes

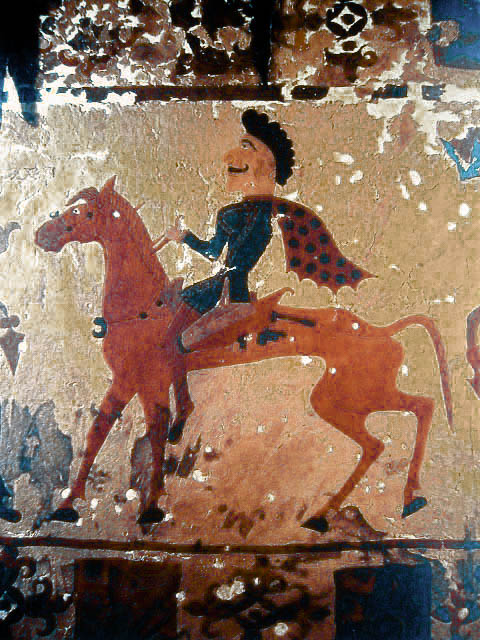
Pazyryk horseman wearing cape 300 BCE

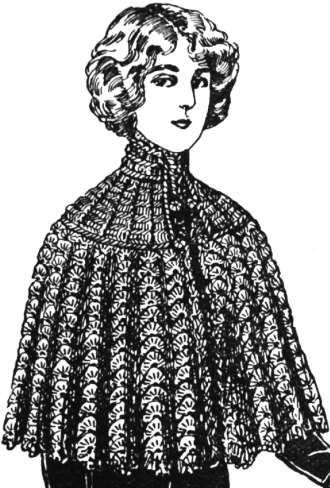
A young woman in a crocheted cape

== See also ==
- Artois (cloak)
- Cape (dog)
- Tippet
- Duster (clothing)
- Mantle (clothing)
- Wrap (clothing)
- Inverness cape
- Ulster coat
