= Boraki (fabric) =

Traditional Bulgarian checkered fabric

Boraki (Bulgarian: Бора̀ки) is a traditional hand-woven checkered fabric that emerged following the Balkan Wars (1912–1913). It was used for making women's outer garments of the saya type and is characteristic of the villages along the western slopes of Pirin in the Sveti Vrach (modern-day Sandanski) region.

== Characteristics and production ==
Boraki fabric in pink and green

The fabric was woven from cotton, wool, or silk depending on the season and personal resources. Its checkered pattern was achieved through a specific combination of warp (kalami) and weft (prefarlyotsi) thread colors. The color combinations were very bright and contrasting—such as red and green, purple and green, pink and green, as well as green and blue, often broken up with yellow and white threads. Due to the distinct nature of the checkered cloth, the saia garments tailored from it also acquired the name "boraki" to distinguish them from earlier types of saia made from other kinds of home-woven fabrics.

== See also ==
- Aba
