= Frieze (textile) =

Coarse Medieval woollen, plain weave cloth with a nap on one side

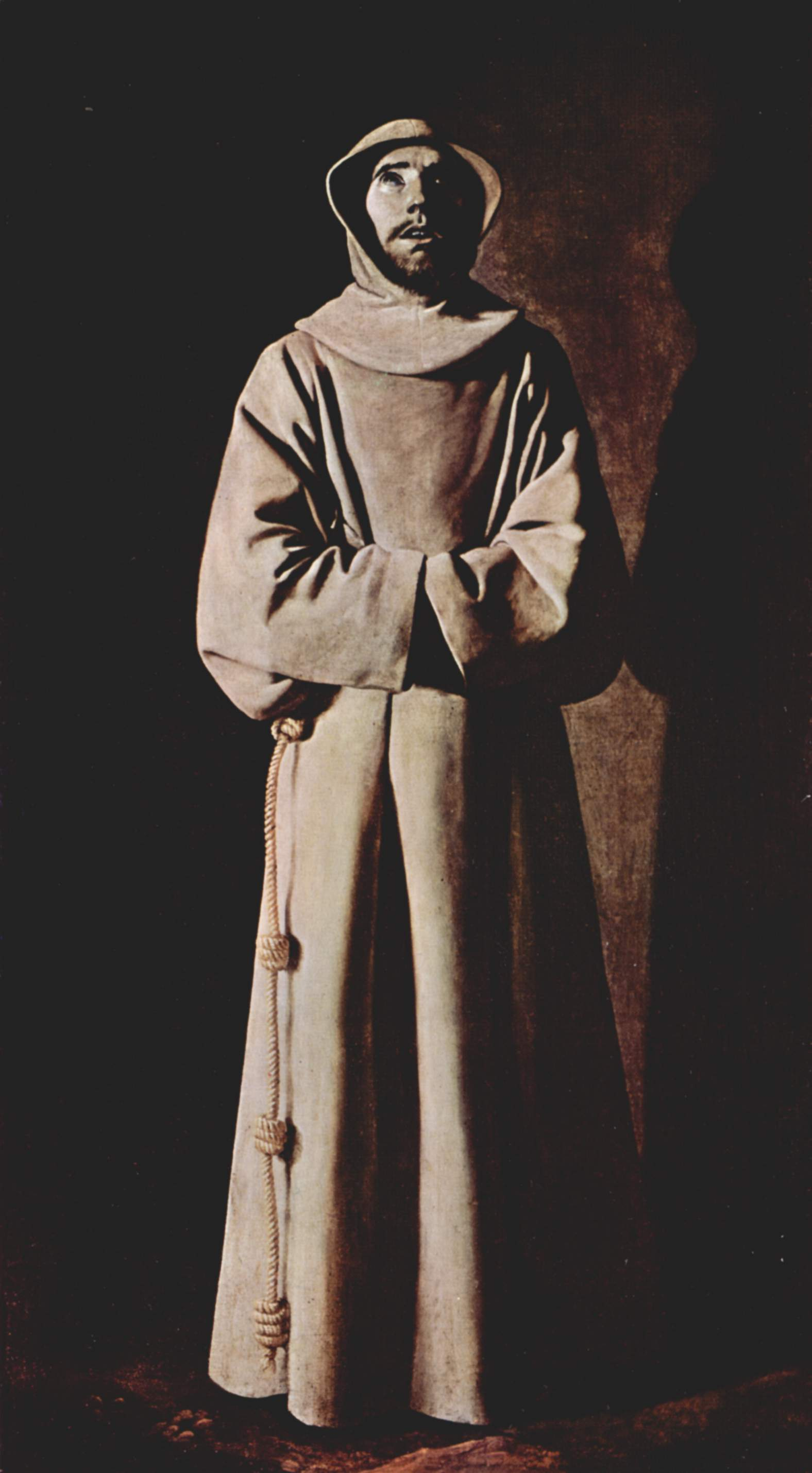

In the history of textiles, frieze (French: frisé) is a Middle English term for a coarse woollen, plain weave cloth with a nap on one side. The nap was raised by scrubbing it to raise curls of fibre, and was not shorn after being raised, leaving an uneven surface.

The term frieze can also be used for the curly nap frieze fabrics have, as well as the action of raising the nap, which differs from standard methods. Today, frieze is also a term applied to a textile technique used in modern machine-loomed carpeting, as well as the textile produced. Carpets made with this technique are known for their resilience, due to a high twist rate, outperforming standard cut or loop pile carpets.

== History ==
Panni frisi, "Frisian cloths", appear in medieval inventories and other documents. Frieze was woven in the English Midlands and Wales, and in Ireland from the fourteenth century, and later in Holland as well. A similar textile is baize. In Old Norse, such cloth was called vaðmál (wadmal), and lengths of wadmal were a medium of exchange, especially for the poor who had neither cattle nor silver. Wadmal could be used to pay property tax.

In the seventeenth century Frize was applied to linen cloth, apparently as from Frisia, an unconnected usage.

Frieze became mostly associated with Ireland in the 19th century, as a traditional cloth second only to Irish tweed which gradually replaced it. It was heavily fulled, often in a fulling mill and made of short fibre wool to produce warm and water repellent outer clothing. Frieze was the cloth most showcased by the ten Irish woollen exhibitors at the Great Exhibition. Daniel O'Connell wore a frieze coat to his first sitting at the Houses of Parliament as a representation of the common Irish people. Coarse frieze was manufactured in England for export to Ireland in the nineteenth century. "Frieze cloth, a mixed and for the most part an unraised fabric, has been manufactured for a series of years, and continues so to be, probably, in increasing quantity", wrote Samuel Jubb in 1860. "This cloth is heavy and sound, rather than fine in quality. It is made... almost entirely for the Irish trade" Frieze was to be seen, Jubb noted impassively, worn so threadbare it was reduced to "the merest expression of threads crossing each other at right angles... on the back of an Irish pig-jobber or that of an Irish reaper." The Ulster, a long loose overcoat as worn in Ulster, was made of frieze. Irish frieze found its way to North America: a stock of hooded coats that was brought to Detroit in 1701 included twenty-three made of frise d'Irlande. Irish frieze was associated with County Waterford and County Tipperary where it became defined with the medieval Waterford Rug and later saw a revival when the Galtee Rug, made by Ardfinnan Woollen Mills in County Tipperary, was made for motoring coats in the 1900s and later overcoats in WW1.

== See also ==
- Wadmal
- Ratteen
