= Ulster coat =

Long, loose, rain-resistant overcoat, originally with a shoulder cape

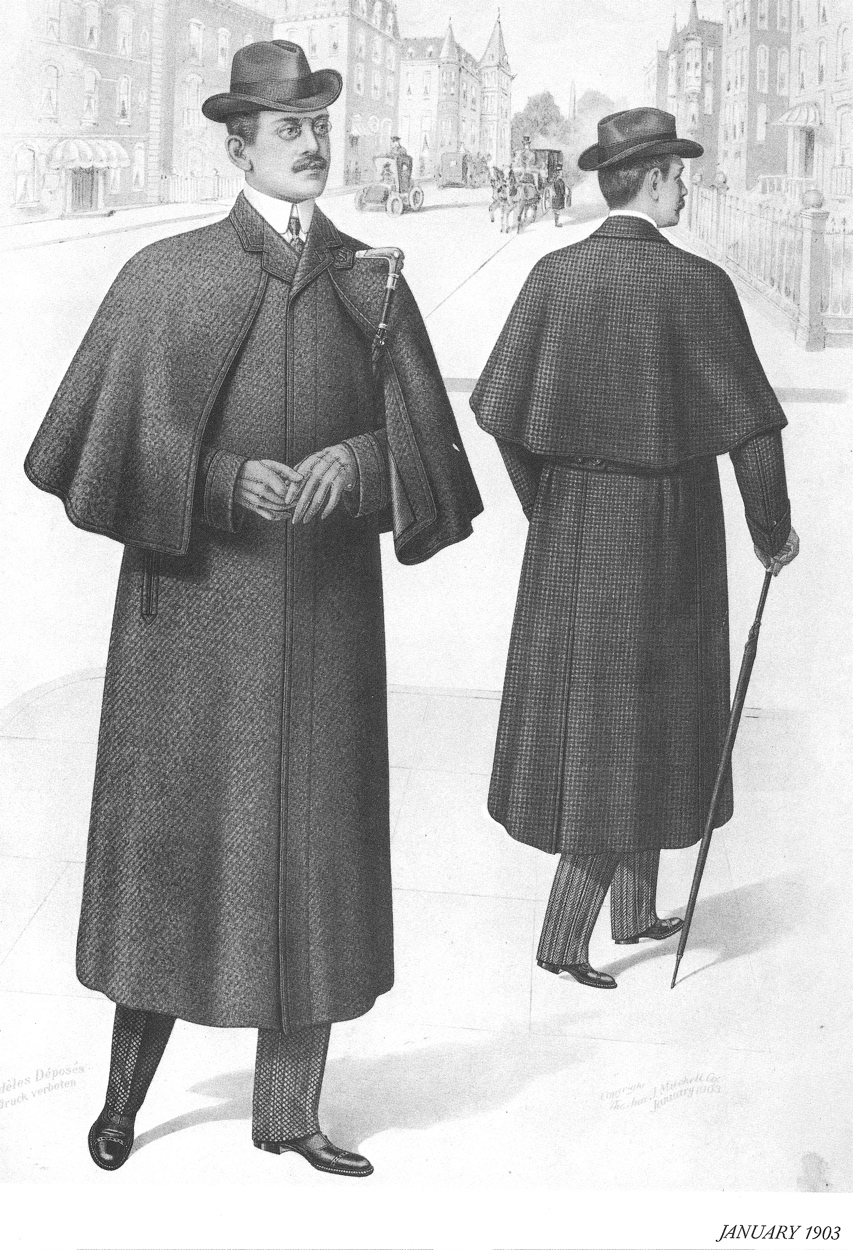
A 1903 fashion plate of an Ulster, showing how the forearms can be brought under the cape.

The Ulster is a Victorian working daytime overcoat, with a cape and sleeves.

The Ulster is distinguished from the Inverness coat by the length of the cape. In the Ulster, the cape only reaches just past the elbows, allowing free movement of the forearms. In the Inverness coat, the cape is as long as the sleeves, and eventually replaced the sleeves in the Inverness cape. The Ulster was commonly worn by coachmen who would be seated outdoors in bad weather for long periods, but needed to use their arms to hold reins.

Often made of hard-wearing fabrics, such as herringbone tweed, it was not a formal coat at the time, though in the 20th century a cape would be seen as such. It began to lose its cape in the 1890s, and now rarely has a cape, but continued to be used as a heavy-duty overcoat, often in a double-breasted style.

A lightweight version of this coat is called an ulsterette.

== Origins ==
In the first half of the nineteenth century, prior to the intoduction of the Ulster coat, the greatcoat or surtout was a major component of a gentleman's wardrobe. Whilst fashionable at the time, these garments proved very cumbersome for travel due to the heavy lengths of overlapping cloth involved in creating the silhouette. By the mid-19th century, these coats had lost ground to lighter variations such as the Chesterfield overcoat and the Albert. The new styles, designed primarily for show, did not offer their predecessors' level of weather-protection. John Getty McGee of McGee & Co set about developing a coat that would fulfil this purpose.

By 1866, McGee had conceptualised the coat known as the "Ulster". The design met with much attention upon its introduction and brought acclaim to the Irish designer. Due to the increased sales from the popular coat, the company invested in a second location in Belfast in Ulster, known simply as the "Ulster Coat Warehouse". The success of the male coat eventually led to a public clamouring for a female version. And so in the early 1870s, an ulster coat for women appeared in the market.

== In fiction ==
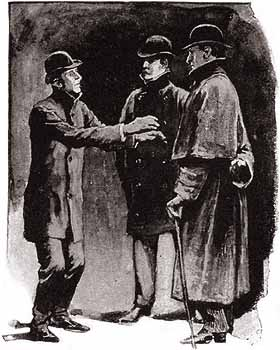
Sherlock Holmes wearing an ulster coat in one of the original Strand Magazine illustrations of The Adventure of the Blue Carbuncle

It is often seen in period productions of Victorian novels, such as those of Charles Dickens and Sir Arthur Conan Doyle. The Ulster coat was referred to in Doyle's Sherlock Holmes novels and short stories: A Study in Scarlet, The Sign of the Four, A Scandal in Bohemia, The Adventure of the Blue Carbuncle and The Adventure of the Noble Bachelor (in which it is worn by a noblewoman). In the Sherlock Holmes short story Blue Carbuncle for example, Watson recounts that: “It was a bitter night, so we drew on our ulsters and wrapped cravats about our throats.” It has been used in a great many late-Victorian costume dramas since.

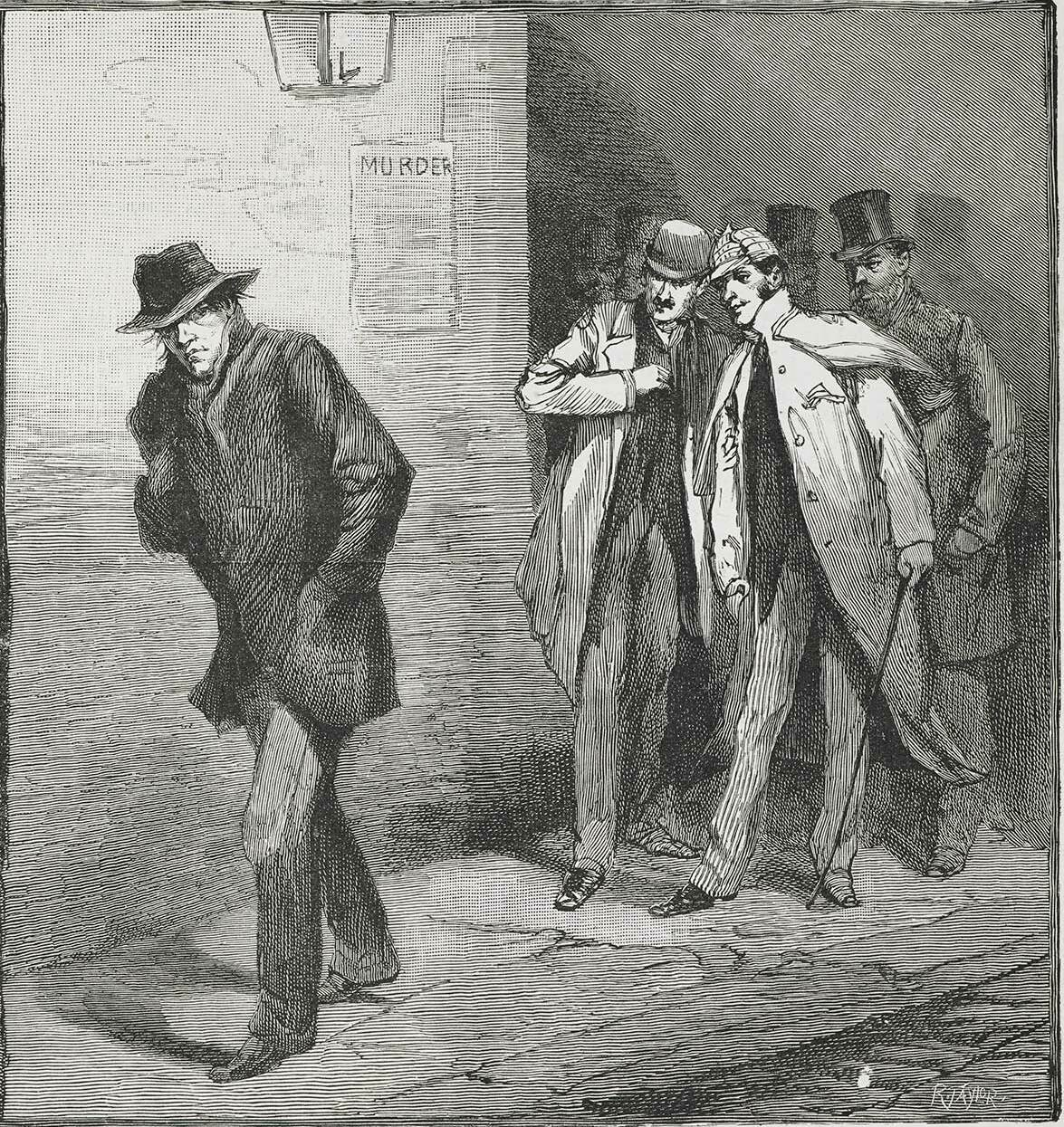
Depiction of Jack the Ripper taken from a series of images from the Illustrated London News for 13 October 1888 carrying the overall caption, "With the Vigilance Committee in the East End". This specific image is entitled "A Suspicious Character". The frontmost follower wears a deerstalker hat and an Ulster coat

It is seen in other works of fiction, including:

- The novel, The Lodger, by Marie Belloc-Lowndes features the infamous Victorian criminal Jack the Ripper stalking the streets of Whitechapel wearing an ulster coat. This was later replicated in the film adaption of the book by 20th Century Fox, where the villain played by Laird Cregar is seen burning an ulster coat in the fire after committing a murderous crime.
- The coat also features briefly in James Joyce’s Dubliners collection of short stories. In the story ‘Grace,’ the character of Mr. Power is wearing an ulster coat when he approaches the drunk Mr. Kernan: “a tall agile gentleman of fair complexion, wearing a long yellow ulster, (coming) from the far end of the bar…”
- In L.M. Montgomery's Anne of Green Gables, Diana is mentioned to wear a "blood-red ulster" at Christmas.
- Marlow, the narrator in Joseph Conrad’s Heart of Darkness, observes: "There was an agent buttoned up inside an ulster and sleeping on a chair on a deck within three feet of me."

In other instances, the appearance of an ulster is a reference to Sherlock Holmes' choice of garment. For example, the title character of Madeline wore an ulster coat as a nod to Sherlock Holmes while doing detective work. Similarly, the Eleventh Doctor, played by Matt Smith, wore an ulster coat when posing as Sherlock Holmes on the Doctor Who episode The Snowmen.

An ulster was worn by Basil, the mouse version of Sherlock Holmes, in the 1986 Walt Disney film The Great Mouse Detective.

Jill Curzon wore a houndstooth ulster when playing Louise Who, the niece to Dr. Who, played by Peter Cushing in Daleks' Invasion Earth 2150 A.D..

The New Batman Adventures and Superman: The Animated Series features a forest green ulster worn by Jervis Tetch (Roddy McDowall), a mad scientist themed on the Mad Hatter from Lewis Carroll's Alice's Adventures in Wonderland and Through the Looking-Glass.

== See also ==
- Loden cape
- Duster (clothing)
