= History of Scottish =

History of Scottish may refer to:

- History of Scottish Gaelic
- History of the Scottish culture
- History of the Scottish people
- History of the Scots language
