= Ratteen =

Thick, napped, twilled woolen material

Ratteen or ratine is a thick napped twilled woolen material. Ratteen was produced in France, Italy and Holland. There are several varieties of coarse ratteen, such as drugget, baize and frieze. It was produced in various options; for instance, similar to broadcloth, without shearing the pile and, another one was with friezed nap surface. There was also a mix of wool and linen in 50% ratio. Rattinet (ratinet) was a thinner variety of ratteen.
