= Artois (cloak) =

Long cloak worn by women in the 18th century

An artois was a long cloak worn by women in the 18th century. It was made with several capes, having lapels and revers like a box coat.
