= Wadmal =

Old type of Scandinavian rough cloth

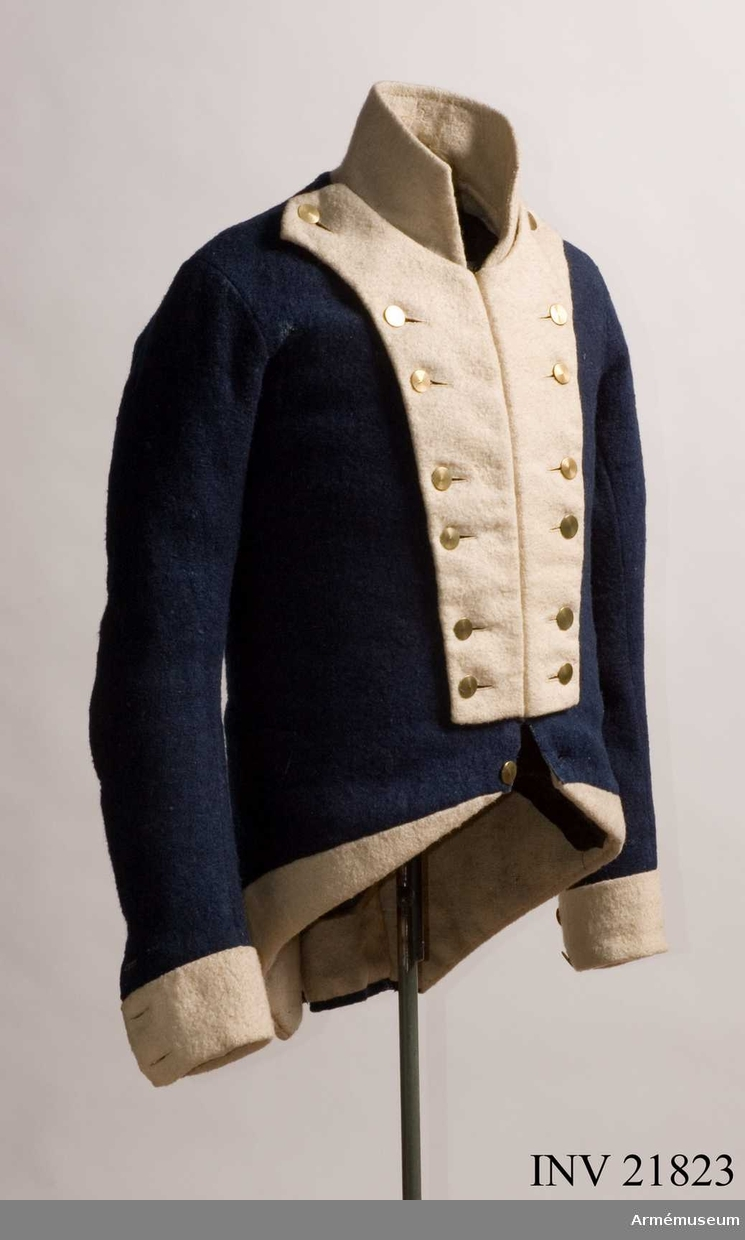
Wadmal army jacket from the Hälsinge Regiment.

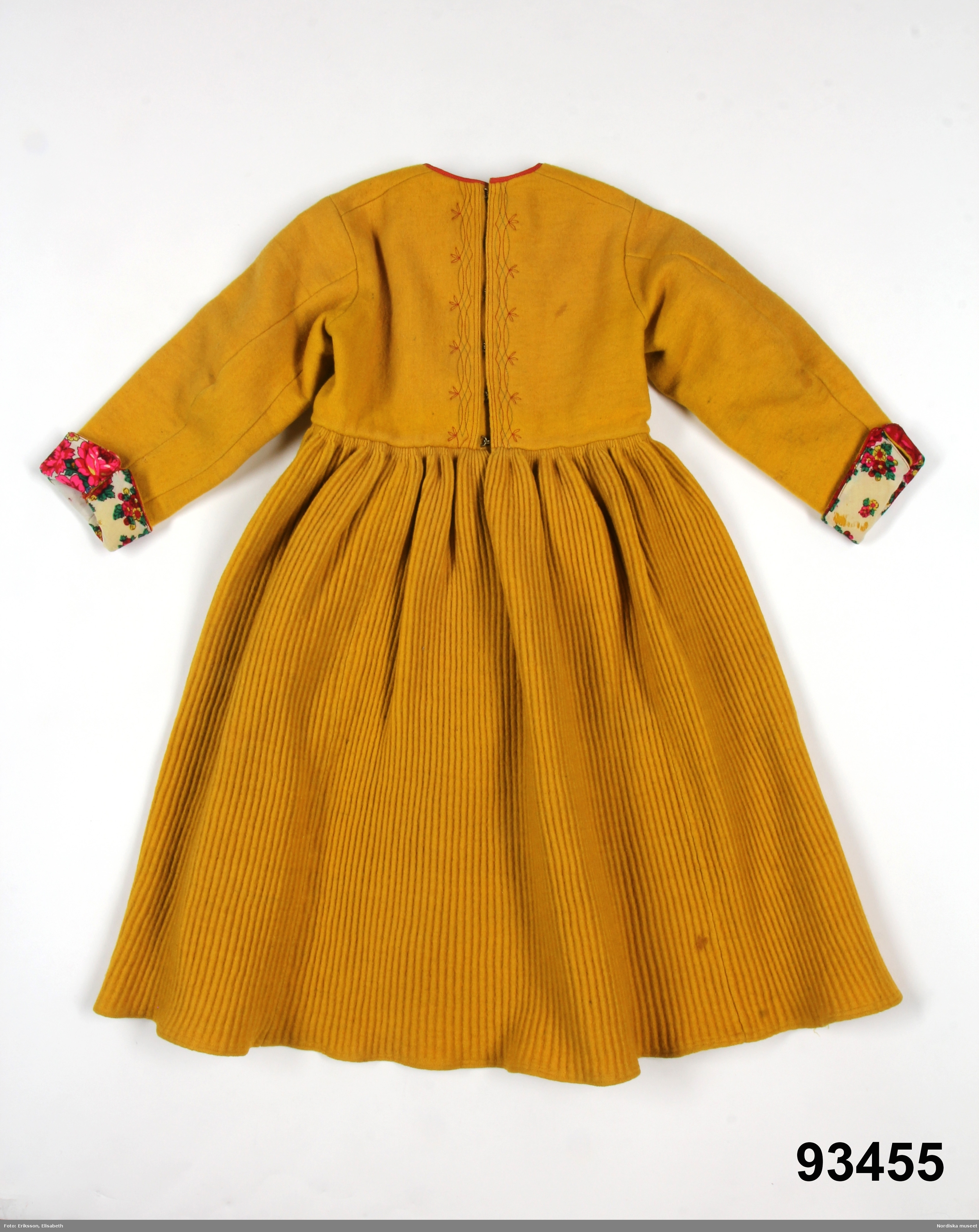
Girls' wadmal dress

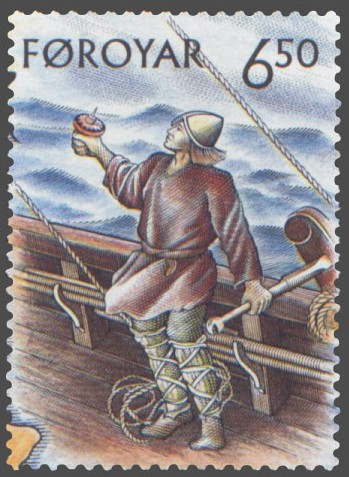
Faroese postage stamp with a picture of a Viking helmsman in a wadmal tunic.

Wadmal (Old Norse: vaðmál; Norwegian: vadmel, 'cloth measure') is a coarse, dense, usually undyed wool fabric woven in Iceland, Norway, Sweden, Denmark, Greenland, and the Orkney, Faroe and Shetland Islands from the Middle Ages into the 18th century. Wadmal was woven on the warp-weighted loom used throughout these areas of Norwegian influence, and was usually a 2/2 twill weave, although some medieval sources outside Iceland describe wadmal as tabby or plain-woven. In remote regions, wadmal remained the primary fabric for working people's clothing into the 18th century.

Wadmal was a medium of exchange throughout Scandinavia. Wadmal was accepted as currency in Sweden, Iceland, Shetland, and Ireland, and exchange rates defined the equivalent of various grades of wadmal (measured in ells) in silver and in cows. According to Bruce Gelsinger, the term watmal was known in Germany and the southern Baltic region as a rough cloth primarily used by the poor.

Historically, wadmal was a common material for military wear, both for combat uniforms and for formal dress uniforms. The Finnish Defence Forces used wadmal tunics (sarkatakki) up to the 1990s, although the main uniform had already been changed to a lighter fabric with the uniform model of 1983 (M/83).

Today, traditional wadmal hunting jackets are still being produced.

== Wadmal in Iceland ==
Wadmal was the main export of Iceland, where length, width, thread count, and weight for different grades were fixed by law. Iceland was also the largest producer of wadmal in the North Atlantic. Producing and selling inadequate wadmal was punishable by law in Iceland; for instance, in Ljósvetninga Saga, one individual is outlawed for selling wadmal full of holes. Wadmal was a dominant form of legal currency in Iceland – both within Iceland and to some extent in the Icelanders’ foreign trade – from the 11th (at the earliest) to 17th century (at the latest). According to archeologist Michele Hayeur Smith, wadmal was significant enough in Iceland “that its production nearly eliminated other textile types from the island’s woven repertoire.” Some have argued that, given the importance of wadmal in Iceland and the fact that women primarily produced it, that gender relations in Iceland may have been more equal than was previously thought: "making vaðmál was making money and this may have provided women with a source of power that was socially understood, as the weavers knew best the differences between good and poor-quality vaðmál. This seeming symbiosis may stem from the small size of the Icelandic colony, the harsh nature of the North Atlantic environment and the need for collaboration between the sexes to guarantee survival. This is not to say that resistance did not exist, but it may have been subtle and reflected in the values and symbolic associations connected to the making of cloth".

== See also ==
- Hodden
- Frieze (textile)
