= Drugget =

Wool or part-wool fabric popular in the 18th century

Druggett or drugget is "a coarse woollen fabric felted or woven, self-coloured or printed one side". Jonathan Swift refers to being "in druggets drest, of thirteen pence a yard".

Formerly, a drugget was a sort of cheap stuff, very thin and narrow, usually made of wool, or half wool and half silk or linen; it may have been corded but was usually plain. The term is now applied to a coarse fabric having a cotton warp and a wool filling, used for rugs, tablecloths, etc.

== See also ==
- Kilim – Flat tapestry-woven carpet
- Ratteen – Thick, napped, twilled woolen material
