= History of Scottish Gaelic =

History of a native Scottish language

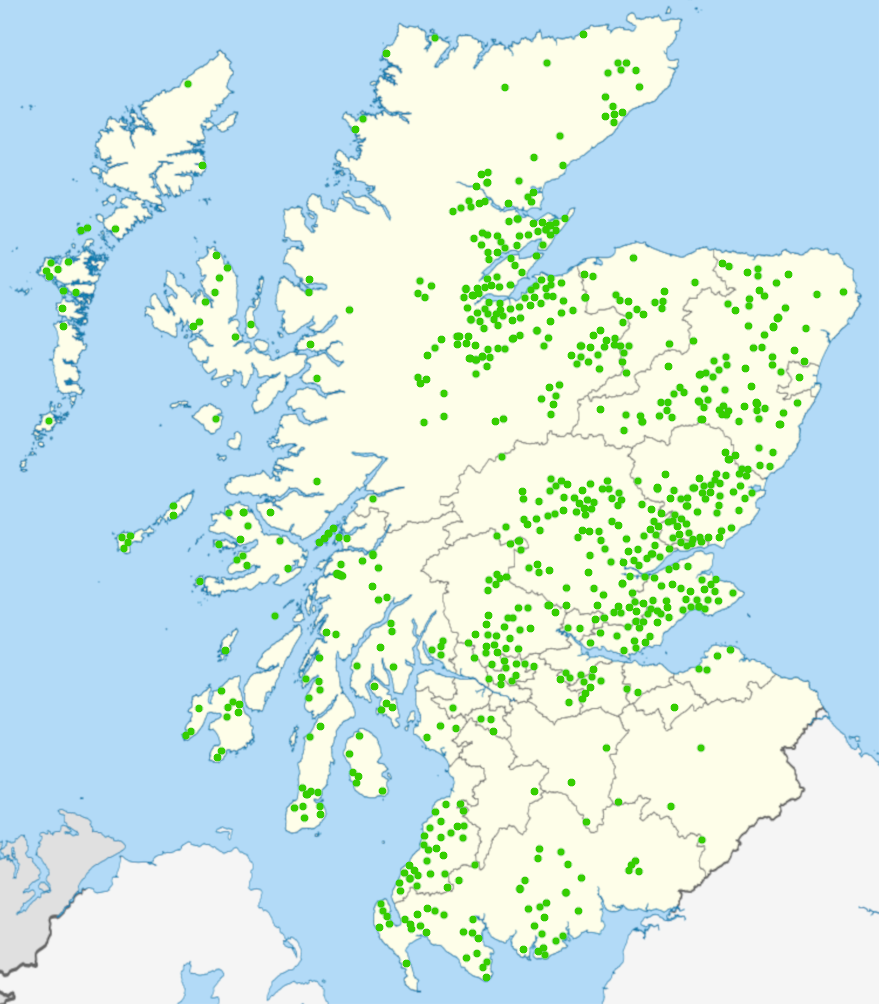
Place names in Scotland that contain the element BAL- (from the Scottish Gaelic 'baile' = town) giving some indication of the extent of medieval Gaelic settlement.

Scottish Gaelic (Gàidhlig [ˈkaːlɪkʲ]), is a Celtic language native to Scotland. A member of the Goidelic branch of the Celtic languages, Scottish Gaelic, like Modern Irish and Manx, developed out of Middle Irish. Most of modern Scotland was once Gaelic-speaking, as evidenced especially by Gaelic-language placenames.

== Origins to zenith ==
Linguistic division in early 12th century Scotland. Gaelic speaking Norse-Gaelic zone, use of either or both languages English-speaking zone Cumbric may have survived in this zone; more realistically a mixture of Cumbric, Gaelic (west) and English (east)

The traditional view is that Gaelic was brought to Scotland, probably in the 4th-5th centuries, by settlers from Ireland who founded the Gaelic kingdom of Dál Riata on Scotland's west coast in present-day Argyll. This view is based mostly on early medieval writings such as the 7th century Irish Senchus fer n-Alban or the 8th century Anglo-Saxon Historia ecclesiastica gentis Anglorum.. Close sea communications with Ireland and the substantial land barrier of the Scottish Highlands to the east contributed to Proto-Celtic in Dál Riata developing into Gaelic rather than into Pictish or Cumbric as it did east and south of the Highlands.

A revisionist theory popularized by the archeologist Ewan Campbell among others contends that Goidelic (the predecessor language of Scottish Gaelic) is instead native to Argyll as far back as the Iron Age. Based on archeological, historical, and linguistic evidence, he contends that Brittonic was never spoken in Argyll and that Dál Riata was based on a pre-existing Goidelic society that included lands on both sides of the North Channel. He argues that medieval accounts of an Irish conquest of Argyll were dynastic propaganda, an "origin legend" invented to bolster the ruling dynasty's claims to legitimacy.

Gaelic in Scotland was mostly confined to Dál Riata until the 8th century, when it began expanding into Pictish areas north of the Firth of Forth and the Firth of Clyde. This was spurred by the intermarriage of Gaelic and Pictish aristocratic families, the political merger of the two kingdoms in the early 9th century, and the common threat of attack by Norse invaders. By 900, Pictish appears to have become extinct, completely replaced by Gaelic. An exception might be made for the Northern Isles, however, where Pictish was more likely supplanted by Norse rather than by Gaelic. During the reign of Caustantín mac Áeda (900–943), outsiders began to refer to the region as the kingdom of Alba rather than as the kingdom of the Picts, but we do not know whether this was because a new kingdom was established or because "Alba" was simply a closer approximation of the Pictish name for the Picts. However, though the Pictish language did not disappear suddenly, a process of Gaelicisation (which may have begun generations earlier) was clearly under way during the reigns of Caustantín and his successors. By a certain point, probably during the 11th century, all the inhabitants of Alba had become fully Gaelicised Scots, and Pictish identity was forgotten.

By the 10th century, Gaelic had become the dominant language throughout northern and western Scotland, the Gaelo-Pictic Kingdom of Alba. Its spread to southern Scotland was less even and less complete. Place name analysis suggests dense usage of Gaelic in Galloway and adjoining areas to the north and west, as well as in West Lothian and parts of western Midlothian. Much less dense usage is suggested for north Ayrshire, Renfrewshire, the Clyde Valley and eastern Dumfriesshire. This latter region is roughly the area of the old Kingdom of Strathclyde, which was annexed by the Kingdom of Alba in the early 11th century, but its inhabitants may have continued to speak Cumbric as late as the 12th century. In south-eastern Scotland, there is no evidence that Gaelic was ever widely spoken: the area shifted from Cumbric to Old English during its long incorporation into the Anglo-Saxon Kingdom of Northumbria. After the Lothians were conquered by Malcolm II at the Battle of Carham in 1018, the elites spoke Gaelic and continued to do so until about 1200. However commoners retained Old English.

With the incorporation of Strathclyde and the Lothians, Gaelic reached its social, cultural, political, and geographic zenith in Scotland. The language in Scotland had been developing independently of the language in Ireland at least as early as its crossing the Druim Alban ("Spine" or "ridge of Britain", its location is not known) into Pictland. The entire country was for the first time being referred to in Latin as Scotia, and Gaelic was recognised as the lingua Scotia.

== The Eclipse of Gaelic in Scotland ==
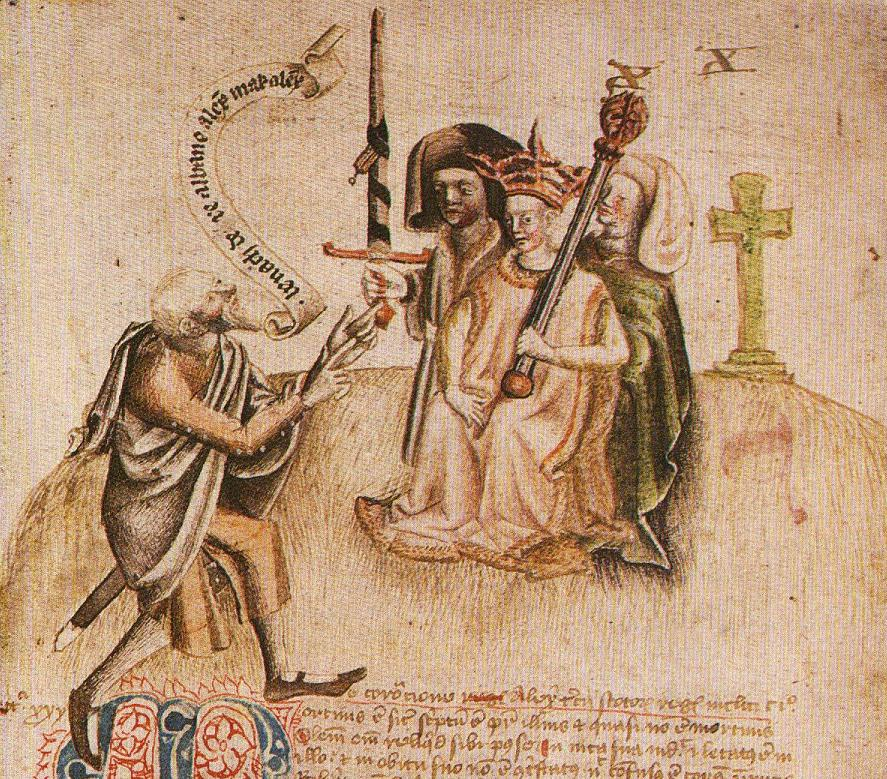
Coronation of King Alexander III on Moot Hill, Scone on 13 July 1249. He is being greeted by the ollamh rìgh, the royal poet, who is addressing him with the proclamation "Benach De Re Albanne" (= Beannachd do Rìgh Albann, "God's Blessing on the King of Scotland"); the poet goes on to recite Alexander's genealogy.

Many historians mark the reign of King Malcolm Canmore (Malcolm III) as the beginning of Gaelic's eclipse in Scotland. In either 1068 or 1070, the king married the exiled Princess Margaret of Wessex. This future Saint Margaret of Scotland was a member of the royal House of Wessex which had occupied the English throne from its founding until the Norman Conquest. Margaret was thoroughly Anglo-Saxon and is often credited (or blamed) for taking the first significant steps in anglicizing the Scottish court. She spoke no Gaelic, gave her children Anglo-Saxon rather than Gaelic names, and brought many English bishops, priests, and monastics to Scotland. Her family also served as a conduit for the entry of English nobles into Scotland. When both Malcolm and Margaret died just days apart in 1093, the Gaelic aristocracy rejected their anglicized sons and instead backed Malcolm's brother Donald as the next King of Scots. Known as Donald Bàn (“the Fair”), the new king had lived 17 years in Ireland as a young man and his power base as an adult was in the thoroughly Gaelic west of Scotland. Upon Donald's ascension to the throne, in the words of the Anglo-Saxon Chronicle, "the Scots drove out all the English who had been with King Malcolm". Malcolm's sons fled to the English court, but in 1097 returned with an Anglo-Norman army backing them. Donald was overthrown, blinded, and imprisoned for the remaining two years of his life. Because of the strong English ties of Malcolm's sons Edgar, Alexander, and David – each of whom became king in turn – Donald Bàn is sometimes called the ‘last Celtic King of Scotland’. He was the last Scottish monarch to be buried on Iona, the one-time center of the Scottish Gaelic Church and the traditional burial place of the Gaelic Kings of Dàl Riada and the Kingdom of Alba.

During the reigns of the sons of Malcolm Canmore (1097-1153), Anglo-Norman names and practices spread throughout Scotland south of the Forth-Clyde line and along the northeastern coastal plain as far north as Moray. Norman French became dominant among the new feudal aristocracy, especially in southern Scotland, and completely displaced Gaelic at court. The establishment of royal burghs throughout the same area, particularly under David I, attracted large numbers of foreigners speaking ‘Inglis’, the language of the merchant class. This was the beginning of Gaelic's status as a predominantly rural language in Scotland. The country experienced significant population growth in the 1100s and 1200s in the expanding burghs and their nearby agricultural districts. These economic developments helped spread English as well.

Gaelic still retained some of its old prestige in medieval Scotland. At the coronation of King Alexander III in 1249, a traditional seanchaidh or story-teller recited the king's full genealogy in Gaelic all the way back to Fergus Mòr, the mythical progenitor of the Scots in Dál Riata, “in accordance with the custom which had grown up in the kingdom from antiquity right up to that time”. Clan chiefs in the northern and western parts of Scotland continued to support Gaelic bards who remained a central feature of court life there. The semi-independent Lordship of the Isles in the Hebrides and western coastal mainland remained thoroughly Gaelic since the language's recovery there in the 12th century, providing a political foundation for cultural prestige down to the end of the 15th century.

That being said, it seems clear that Gaelic had ceased to be the language of Scotland by 1400 at the latest. It disappeared from the central lowlands by about 1350 and from the eastern coastal lowlands north of the Mounth not long afterwards. By the mid-1300s English in its Scottish form – what eventually came to be called Scots—emerged as the official language of government and law. Scotland's emergent nationalism in the era following the conclusion of the Wars of Scottish Independence was organized around and through Scots as well. For example, the nation's great patriotic literature including John Barbour's The Brus (1375) and Blind Harry's The Wallace (before 1488) was written in Scots, not Gaelic. It was around this time that the very name of Gaelic began to change. Down through the 14th century, Gaelic was referred to in English as Scottis, i.e. the language of the Scots. By the end of the 15th century, however, the Scottish dialect of Northern English had absorbed that designation. English/Scots speakers referred to Gaelic instead as Yrisch or Erse, i.e. Irish. King James IV (died 1513) thought Gaelic important enough to learn and speak. However, he was the last Scottish monarch to do so.

== Persecution, Retreat, and Dispersal ==
The historian Charles Withers argues that the geographic retreat of Gaelic in Scotland is the context for the establishment of the country's signature divide between the 'Lowlands' and the 'Highlands'. Before the late 1300s, there is no evidence that anyone thought of Scotland as divided into two geographic parts. From the 1380s onward, however, the country was increasingly understood to be the union of two distinct spaces and peoples: one inhabiting the low-lying south and the eastern seaboard speaking English/Scots; another inhabiting the mountainous north and west as well as the islands speaking Gaelic. What Gaelic remained in the Lowlands in the sixteenth century had disappeared completely by the eighteenth. Gaelic vanished from Fife by 1600, eastern Caithness by 1650, and Galloway by 1700. At the same time the Scottish crown entered a determined period of state-building in which cultural, religious and linguistic unity was of the highest value. As Lowland Scots sought increasingly to 'civilise' their Highland brethren, Gaelic became an object of particular persecution. Combined with larger economic and social changes, Gaelic began a long and nearly terminal retreat.

The Scottish crown forced the forfeiture of all the lands held under the Lordship of the Isles in 1493 and thereby eliminated the core Gaelic region of mediæval Scotland as a political entity. Rather than solve the problems of endemic violence and resistance to Lowland rule, the destruction of the Lordship tended to exacerbate them. While Scottish kings had sought to fully integrate the west and the islands into the rest of Scotland since taking formal control of the area from the King of Norway in 1266, the policy culminated with James VI. He began an on-again off-again policy of pacification and 'civilisation' of the Highlands upon taking effective personal rule of his kingdom in 1583. This especially meant establishing the clear rule of royal writ and the suppression of all independent-minded local clan leaders. As a precursor to the Plantation of Ulster, James and the Scottish Parliament even planted hundreds of Lowland Scots settlers from Fife on the Isle of Lewis in the late 1590s and again in the first decade of the 1600s.

Many point to the Statutes of Iona as the beginning of official government persecution of Gaelic in Scotland. In 1609 James VI/I through his agent Andrew Knox, Bishop of the Isles, successfully negotiated a series of texts with nine prominent Gaelic chiefs on the ancient island of Iona. The provisions sought to enlist the chiefs themselves in undermining the traditional Gaelic political order including an end to traditional Gaelic 'guesting and feasting', limitations on the size of chiefs' retinues, and a ban on bands of travelling bards. From the point of view of the Gaelic language, the most notable statute was the one which compelled the chiefs to send their eldest child to schools in the Lowlands so as to ensure the next generation of Highland elites "may be found able sufficiently to speik, reid and wryte Englische".

The historian Julian Goodare downplays the importance of the Statues of Iona in favour of seeing them as part of a much larger set of regulations which the crown sought to promulgate for the reorganisation of Gaelic society. He stresses the greater importance of a 1616 Act of the Privy Council of Scotland which declared that no heir of a Gaelic chief could inherit unless he could write, read and speak English. Another 1616 act of the Privy Council commanded the establishment of at least one English language school in every parish in Scotland so that "the Irish language, which is one of the chief and principal causes of the continuance of barbarity and incivility among the inhabitants of the Isles and Highlands may be abolished and removed". Withers claims that by the mid-1700s all Highland gentry were bilingual. While these policies had no effect on the Gaelic-speaking masses, they did aid the integration of the Gaelic elite into the British polity and English-speaking society.

Economic and educational developments seriously diminished Gaelic in Scotland over the course of the 17th and 18th centuries. English penetrated the Highlands and Isles particularly through commerce and sheep-ranching. Highland burghs such as Inverness and Fort William were outposts of English in the region, becoming only more so following the Jacobite rising of 1745. As English-speakers held all economic power outside the Highlands and most of it within the Gaidhealtachd, Gaelic monolingualism was fast becoming an economic hindrance. Men tended to learn English before women and children and Gaels tended to use English for economic transactions even if they weren't fluent in it. Particularly on the fringes of the Highlands, English words and accents began to 'corrupt' Gaelic speech in the 1700s and by 1800 residents of most 'outer Gaidhealtachd' parishes could understand and use English in everyday life even if Gaelic remained their native tongue.

Education policy was much more intentional in undermining Gaelic in Scotland. Before the late 1600s, schools for the middle class, not to mention poor crofters, did not exist in the Highlands and Isles. Gaelic culture was largely non-literate at the time and thus Gaels themselves were unable to provide a modern education to their children even if they had wanted to do so. Moreover, Lowland elites had long considered Gaelic to be among the chief impediments to Scottish national unity and to the spread of 'civilization' throughout the country, especially literacy and Protestantism. Thus Lowland Scots began establishing the first schools in Argyll in the late 1600s and in northern Scotland in the 1700s, all of them being strictly in the English language. The Society in Scotland for Propagating Christian Knowledge (SSPCK) was the most important early organization to set up schools in the Gaidhealtachd. From the SSPCK's perspective, the primary purpose of education was cultural – to teach the Bible, to teach the catechism of the Church of Scotland, and to teach the English language. Even though many pupils came to school with no ability to communicate in English, SSPCK schools were strictly English-only throughout most of the eighteenth century. Not only was Gaelic forbidden in school, SSPCK schools even banned the use of Gaelic in the schoolyard. The Church of Scotland also established parochial schools in the Gaidhealtachd in the 1700s and likewise banned the use of Gaelic except in translating. Gaelic-speaking pupils were not taught their own language in school until the early 19th century, first by schools operated by the Gaelic Society and later in SSPCK and parochial schools. For the latter two organizations, however, Gaelic was only introduced to provide a better stepping stone to English. Gaelic Society school numbers peaked around 1825 but had basically disappeared by the 1860s. A report of the Secretary of State in 1871 sums up the prevailing view of the period: "The Gaelic language … decidedly stands in the way of the civilization of the natives making use of it". In 1872 Scotland moved for the first time to a compulsory, state-directed and state-funded system of education covering the entire country. Even then no provision of any kind was made for Gaelic.

Economic dislocation of Gaels beginning in the early 1700s began to change the geography of Gaelic. As Gaelic migrants left the Highlands and Isles first for the major cities of Edinburgh and Glasgow, later for the secondary cities of Aberdeen, Dundee, Greenock and Perth, they temporarily returned Gaelic to the Lowlands. In the late 1700s Gaelic chapels began to be founded in Lowland cities suggesting a critical mass of Gaelic-speakers had been reached by then. The first such Gaelic chapel was established in Edinburgh in 1769. By the late 1800s, Glasgow alone had ten Gaelic chapels and was clearly the urban centre of Lowland Gaelic. In this same period Gaelic became a global language. The first Gaelic-speaking migrants arrived in North America in 1770, settling originally on Prince Edward Island and later on mainland Nova Scotia and the Mohawk Valley of New York. After the American Revolution, most of the Gaels of New York moved to Glengarry County, Ontario where they joined other Highland emigrants in their new settlement. The first Gaelic-speaking settlers directly from Scotland arrived on Cape Breton in 1802. A huge wave of Gaelic immigration to Nova Scotia took place between 1815 and 1840, so large that by the mid-19th century Gaelic was the third most common language in Canada after English and French. It is estimated that there were 50,000 Gaelic speakers in Nova Scotia in 1901, more than one-sixth of all Gaelic-speakers in the world at the time. Gaels also emigrated to North Carolina in the 1700s and Gaelic was regularly spoken there until the American Civil War.

Despite the dispersal of Gaelic to North America (and to Australasia), the 17th through 19th centuries witnessed a tremendous erosion of Gaelic. The first reliable statistics on the prevalence of Gaelic in Scotland begin in the 1690s. At that time around 25–30% of the country spoke Gaelic. By the time the first Census of Scotland asked the population about its ability to speak Gaelic in 1881, that figure had been whittled down to merely 6%.

== Modern era ==
Scottish Gaelic has a rich oral (beul-aithris) and written tradition, having been the language of the bardic culture of the Highland clans for many years. The language preserves knowledge of and adherence to pre-feudal 'tribal' laws and customs (as represented, for example, by the expressions tuatha and dùthchas). These attitudes were still evident in the complaints and claims of the Highland Land League of the late 19th century, which elected MPs to the Parliament of the United Kingdom. However, the language suffered under centralisation efforts by the Scottish and later British states, especially after the Battle of Culloden in 1746, during the Highland Clearances, and by the exclusion of Scottish Gaelic from the educational system.

According to Yale University music professor Willie Ruff, the singing of the metrical psalms in Scottish Gaelic introduced by Presbyterians immigrants to North Carolina, Georgia, and Virginia from the Scottish Hebrides evolved from "lining out" – where one person sings a solo before others follow – into the call and response of gospel music of the southern USA. The veracity of this claim has, however, been disputed.

A Classical Irish translation of the Bible dating from the Elizabethan era was in use until the Bible was translated into Scottish Gaelic. Author David Ross notes in his 2002 history of Scotland that a Scottish Gaelic version of the Bible was published in London in 1690 by the Rev. Robert Kirk, Episcopalian minister of Aberfoyle; it was not, however, widely printed or circulated. The first well-known translation of the Bible into Scottish Gaelic was made in 1767 when Dr James Stuart of Killin and Dugald Buchanan of Rannoch produced a translation of the New Testament. Very few European languages have made the transition to a modern literary language without an early modern translation of the Bible. The lack of a well-known translation until the late 18th century may have contributed to the decline of Scottish Gaelic.

In the 21st century, Scottish Gaelic literature has seen development within the area of prose fiction publication, as well as challenges due to the continuing decline of the language. At the same time, the Scottish Gaelic Renaissance has led to the increasing use of Scottish Gaelic-medium education, which has created fluent speakers in both Scotland and Nova Scotia and new dialects like Glasgow Gaelic are developing in historically English-speaking communities of the country.

== Defunct dialects ==
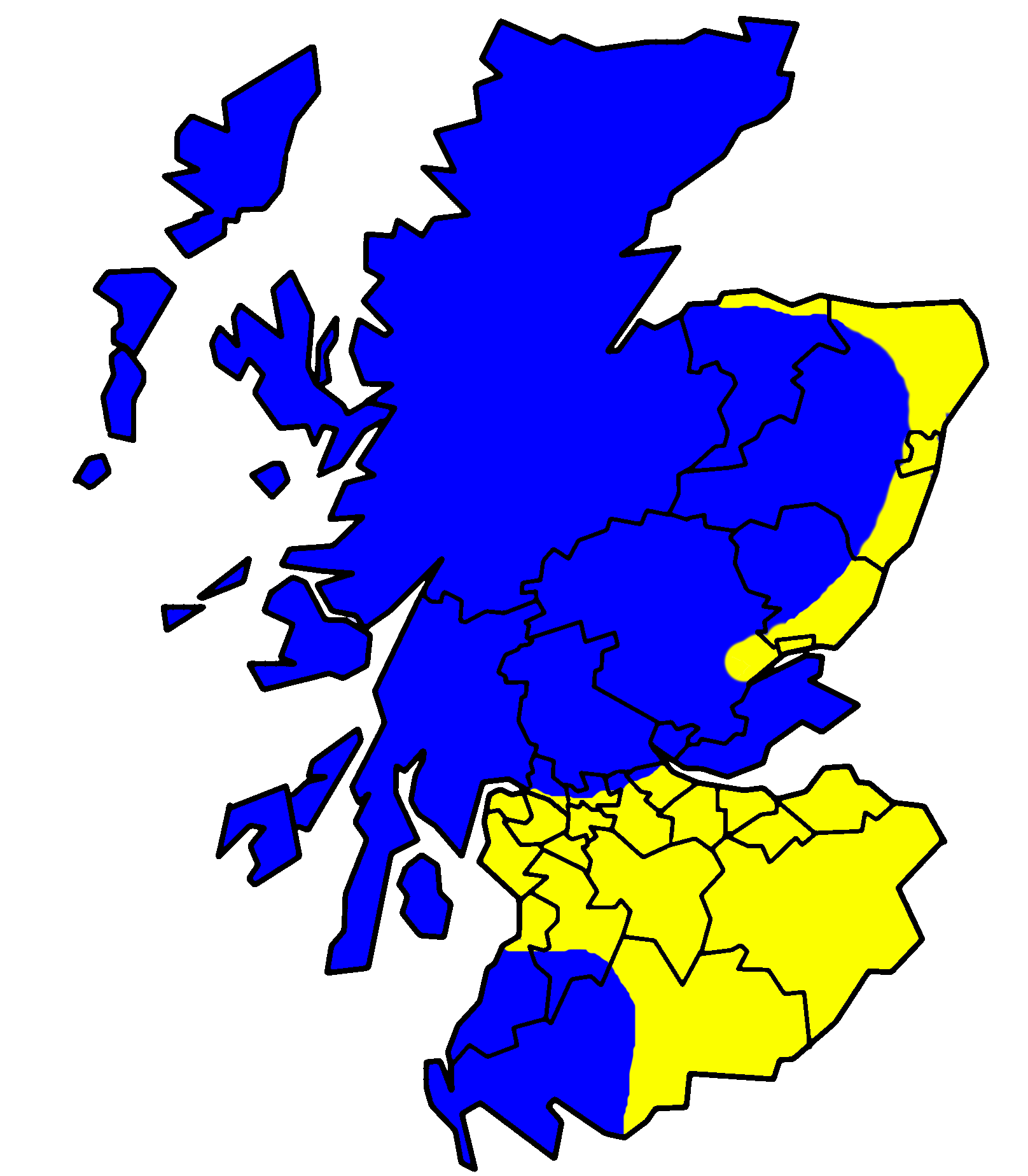
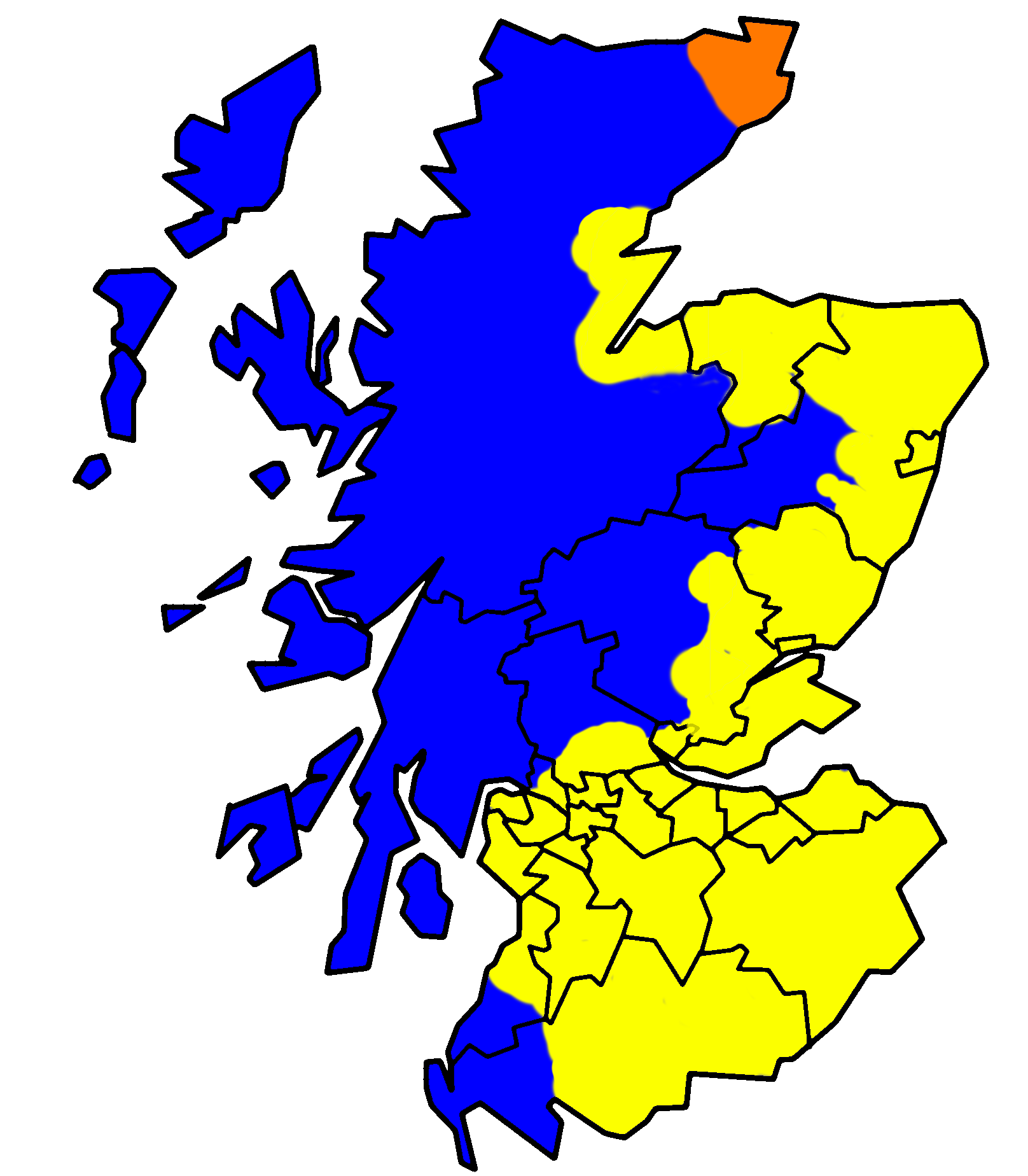
Two interpretations of the linguistic divide in the middle ages. Left: the divide in 1400 after Loch, 1932; Right: the divide in 1500 after Nicholson, 1974. (both reproduced from Withers, 1984)
Gaelic
Scots
Norn

All surviving dialects are Highland and/or Hebridean dialects. Dialects of Lowland Gaelic have become defunct since the demise of Galwegian Gaelic, originally spoken in Galloway, which seems to have been the last Lowland dialect and which survived into the Modern Period. By the 18th century Lowland Gaelic had been largely replaced by Lowland Scots across much of Lowland Scotland. According to a reference in The Carrick Covenanters by James Crichton, the last place in the Lowlands where Scottish Gaelic was still spoken was the village of Barr in Carrick: only a few miles inland to the east of Girvan, but at one time very isolated. Crichton gives neither date nor details.

There is no evidence from place names of significant linguistic differences between, for example, Argyll and Galloway. Dialects on both sides of the Straits of Moyle (the North Channel) linking Scottish Gaelic with Irish are now extinct, though native speakers were still to be found on the Mull of Kintyre, Rathlin and in North East Ireland as late as the mid-20th century. Records of their speech show that Irish and Scottish Gaelic existed in a dialect chain with no clear language boundary.

What is known as Scottish Gaelic is essentially the Gaelic spoken in the Outer Hebrides and on Skye. Generally speaking, the Gaelic spoken across the Western Isles is similar enough to be classed as one major dialect group, although there is still regional variation. For example, the slender 'r' is pronounced [ð] in Lewis, where the Gaelic is thought to have been influenced by Norse, and had a pitch accent system.

Gaelic in Eastern and Southern Scotland is now largely defunct, although the dialects which were spoken in the east tended to preserve a more archaic tone, which had been lost further west. For example, Gaelic speakers in East Sutherland preferred to say Cà 'd robh tu m' oidhche a-raoir? ("Where were you about last night?"), rather than the more common càit an robh thu (oidhche) a-raoir?. Such dialects, along with Manx and Irish, also retain the Classical Gaelic values of the stops, while most dialects underwent devoicing and preaspiration.

A certain number of these dialects, which are now defunct in Scotland, have been preserved, and indeed re-established, in the Nova Scotia Gaelic-speaking community. Those of particular note are the Morar and Lochaber dialects, the latter of which pronounces the broad or velarised l (l̪ˠ) as [w].
