= Loden cape =

Austrian overcoat of dense woollen fabric

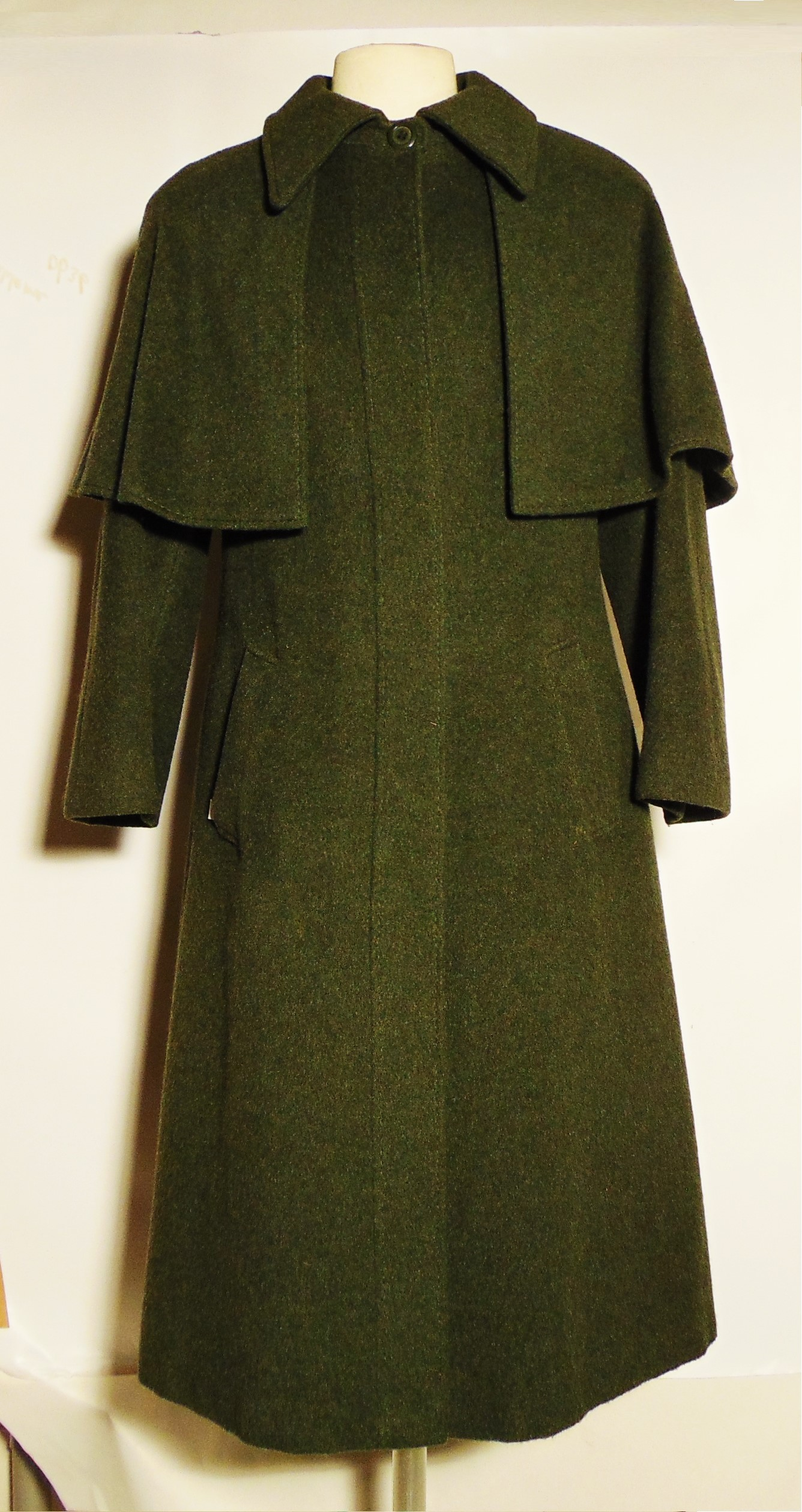
Loden ladies coat

A loden cape is an overcoat of Tyrolean origin, made of a thick, water-resistant woolen material with a short pile known as loden cloth, first produced by peasants in Austria. This fabric is derived from the coarse, oily wool of mountain sheep and has a traditional earthy green colour. The name is derived from Middle High German "lode" or from Old High German "lodo", meaning "coarse cloth". It is a cloth of traditional Tracht worn in Tyrol.

To produce loden cloth, strong yarns are woven loosely into cloth which then undergoes a lengthy process of shrinking, eventually acquiring the texture of felt and becoming quite dense. It is then brushed with a fuller's teasel and the nap is clipped, a process which is repeated a number of times until the resulting fabric provides good warmth for the weight, and is relatively supple, windproof, and extremely durable. It is a subclass of the wools known as "melton".

A similar type of woolen cloth manufacturing comes from the Belgian village of Duffel, giving name to the British Royal Navy Duffel coat, a coat that has most probably partly been produced from Melton wool.
