= Duster (clothing) =

Light, loose-fitting long coat

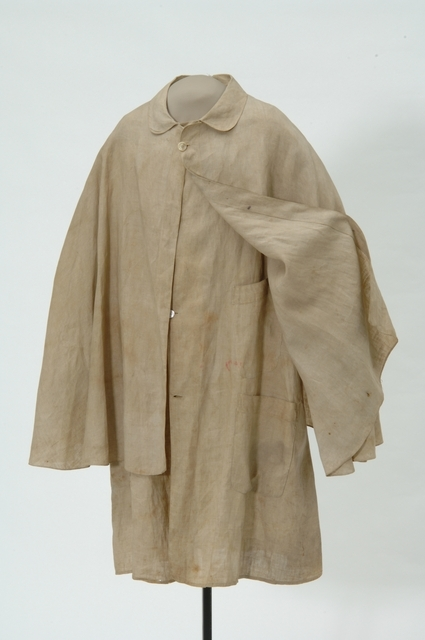
Duster used by one of the Younger Brothers in the Northfield bank raid, 1876.

A duster is a light, loose-fitting, long coat.

== History ==
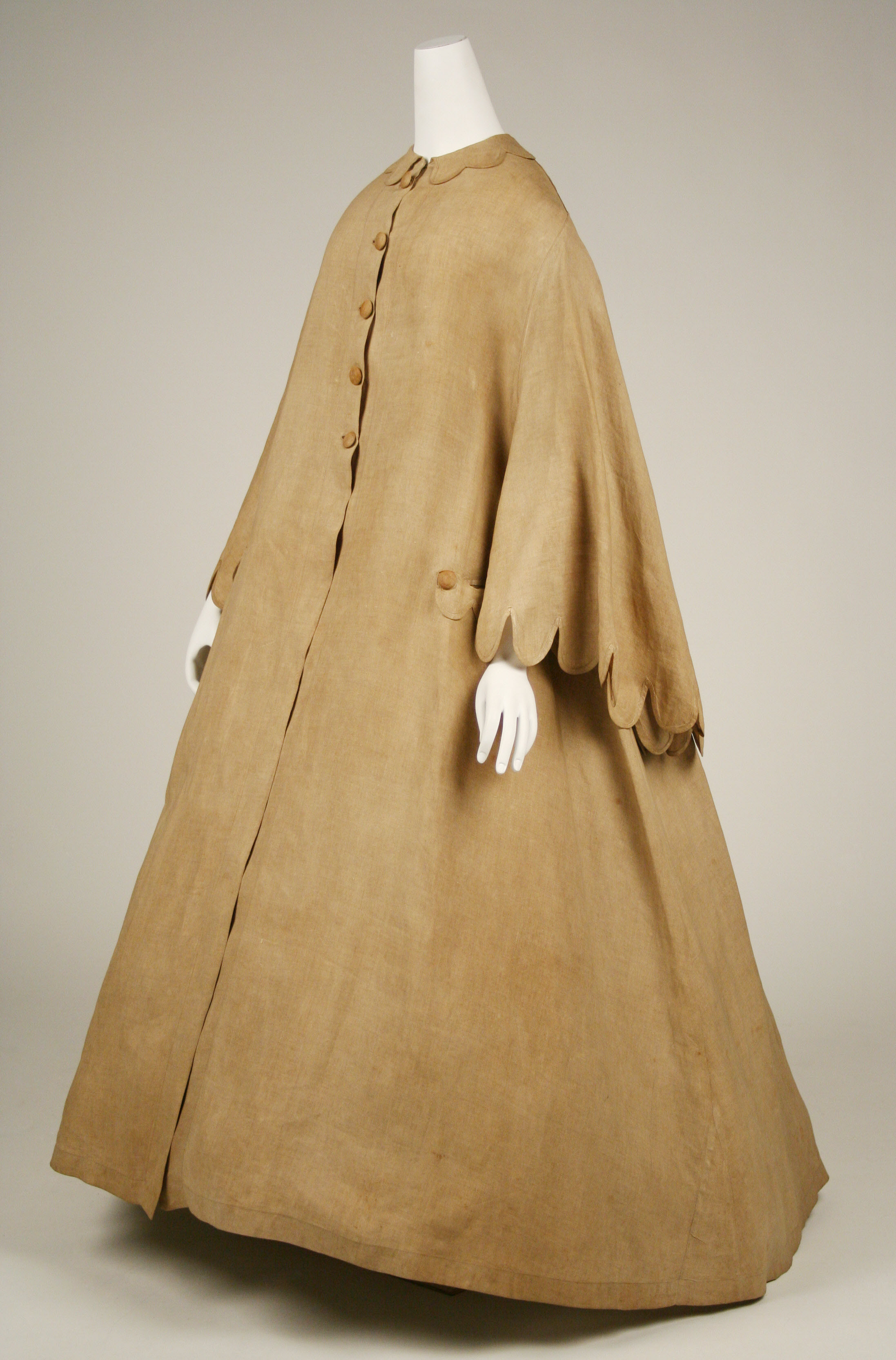
Early 1860s women's duster

The original dusters were full-length, light-colored canvas or linen coats worn by horsemen in the United States to protect their clothing from trail dust. These dusters were typically slit up the back to hip level for ease of wear on horseback.

Dusters intended for riding may have features such as a buttonable rear slit and leg straps to hold the flaps in place.

For better protection against rain, dusters were made from oilcloth and later from waxed cotton.

In the late 19th and early 20th centuries, both men and women would wear dusters to protect their clothes when riding in open motorcars on the dirt roads of the day.

== Today: Revival through film and television ==
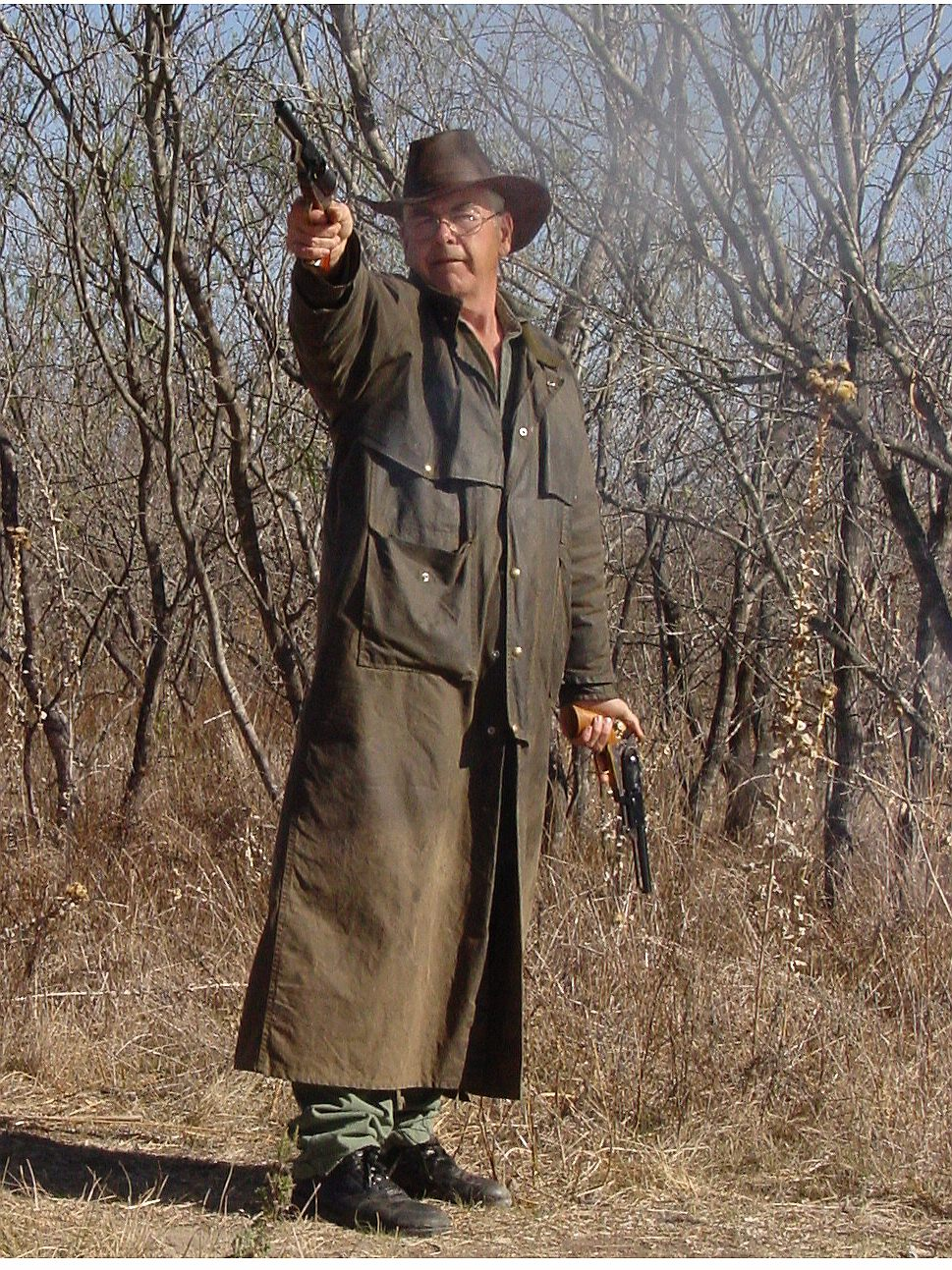
Old West reenactor wearing a duster

Western horsemen's dusters figured little in Western films until Sergio Leone re-introduced them in his movies The Good, the Bad, and the Ugly (1966) and Once Upon a Time in the West (1968). According to production designer Carlo Simi, Leone was fond of dusters. The two of them went to look for men's wear at the Western Costume shop in California, which was a very large warehouse on the Warner Brothers lot and was dispensing most costumes worn in Westerns filmed in the US. There, they happened upon some dustcoats for horse riding, which had already been shown in John Ford's The Man Who Shot Liberty Valance. The coats were white but the Leone team changed them to chocolate brown.

In Once Upon a Time in the West, the character of Harmonica, portrayed by Charles Bronson, is looking at the dusters worn by the men of Cheyenne (Jason Robards), who asks him if he's "interested in men's fashion." Harmonica responds, "I saw three of these dusters a short time ago; they were waitin' for a train. Inside the dusters there were three men ... inside the men there were three bullets."

As Leone's westerns were "dramatically stylish," they also influenced with their costumes and choice of shots the world of fashion. Once Upon a Time was a massive hit in France, ranking 7th in the most attended films of all time. The film caused a fashion trend for duster coats in the French capital of such proportions that department stores, such as Au Printemps, affixed signs on escalators warning customers to keep their "maxis," as they were called, clear from the edges of the moving steps in order to prevent jamming and injuries.

In the film genre of heroic bloodshed of Hong Kong films, the protagonists are often seen wearing dusters. In Kirk Wong's 1988 gangster film Gunmen, set in 1930s Shanghai, the protagonist (Tony Leung) wears a flowing Chinese robe similar to Leone's dusters. Director John Woo's 1986 A Better Tomorrow, featured Chow Yun Fat's character, nicknamed Brother Mark, wearing a duster. Following the film's release, many teenagers in Hong Kong came to wear dusters in emulation of Chow's character. In colloquial Cantonese, trench coats are called Mark Gor Lau (literally, "Brother Mark's coat").

The fictional anti-hero Omar Little wears dusters both as outerwear and as a silk sleepwear coverup in the HBO series, The Wire.

The Tenth Doctor played by David Tennant wore a cinnamon brown duster coat on Doctor Who. Van Pelt, the main antagonist in Jumanji: Welcome to the Jungle, wore a dark brown duster coat. Harry Dresden from Jim Butcher's Dresden Files wears a duster, as well as other cowboy-like attire. In the television comedy series "It's Always Sunny in Philadelphia", a black leather duster is featured in several episodes that is prized by several main characters, who often argue over who looks better wearing it.

In modern times, leather dusters are worn by motorcyclists to prevent road rash.

== See also ==
- Trench coat
- Cowboy hat
- Western wear
- Stage clothes
- Costume designer
- American fashion
