= Tommy Hilfiger (company) =

American apparel brand

Tommy Hilfiger B.V.

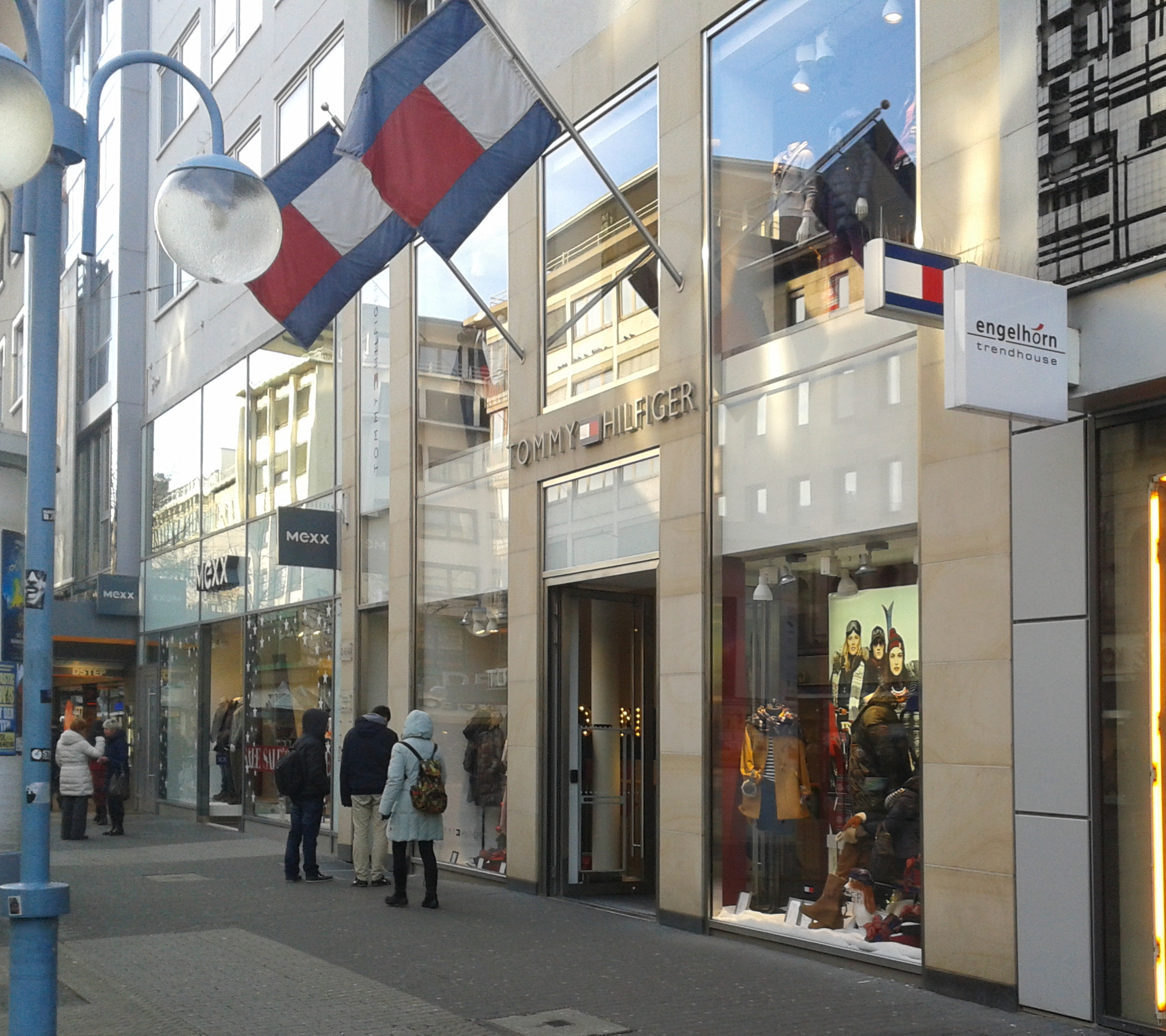
- A Tommy Hilfiger store in Mannheim, Germany
- Formerly: Tommy Hilfiger Corporation; Tommy Hilfiger Inc.
- Type: Subsidiary
- Industry: Fashion
- Founded: 1985; 41 years ago in New York City, U.S.
- Founder: Tommy Hilfiger
- Headquarters: Danzigerkade 165, 1013 AP Amsterdam, Netherlands
- Key people: Lea Rytz Goldman (President)
- Products: Apparel, accessories, fragrances and homewares
- Revenue: ▼US$4.65 billion (2022)
- Parent: PVH Corp. (2010–present)
- Website: global.tommy.com

Tommy Hilfiger B.V. (/hɪlˈfɪɡər/ hil-FIG-ər), formerly known as Tommy Hilfiger Corporation and Tommy Hilfiger Inc., is a Dutch-based American clothing brand that manufactures apparel and licensed products such as footwear, accessories, fragrances and home furnishings. The company was founded in New York City in 1985, and its merchandise is sold in department stores and over 2000 free-standing retail stores in 100 countries. Its headquarters are located in Amsterdam.

The red and white fields at the center of the Tommy Hilfiger logo are inspired by the International Code of Signals flag for the letter ‘H’, symbolizing Hilfiger, and reflect the brand’s enduring association with nautical style and the American preppy look.

In 2006, private equity firm Apax Partners acquired the company for approximately $1.6 billion. In March 2010, PVH Corp., then known as Phillips-Van Heusen, bought the company. Daniel Grieder was appointed CEO in July 2014, while founder Tommy Hilfiger remains the company's principal designer, leading the design teams and overseeing the entire creative process. Global sales in retail through the brand were US$9.1 billion in 2022.

== History ==
=== 20th century ===
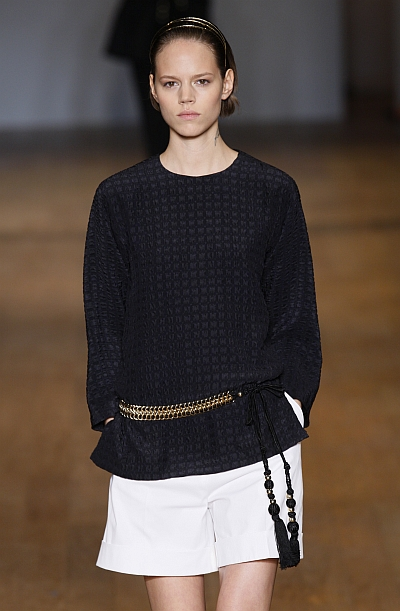
Freja Beha Erichsen at Tommy Hilfiger in 2009

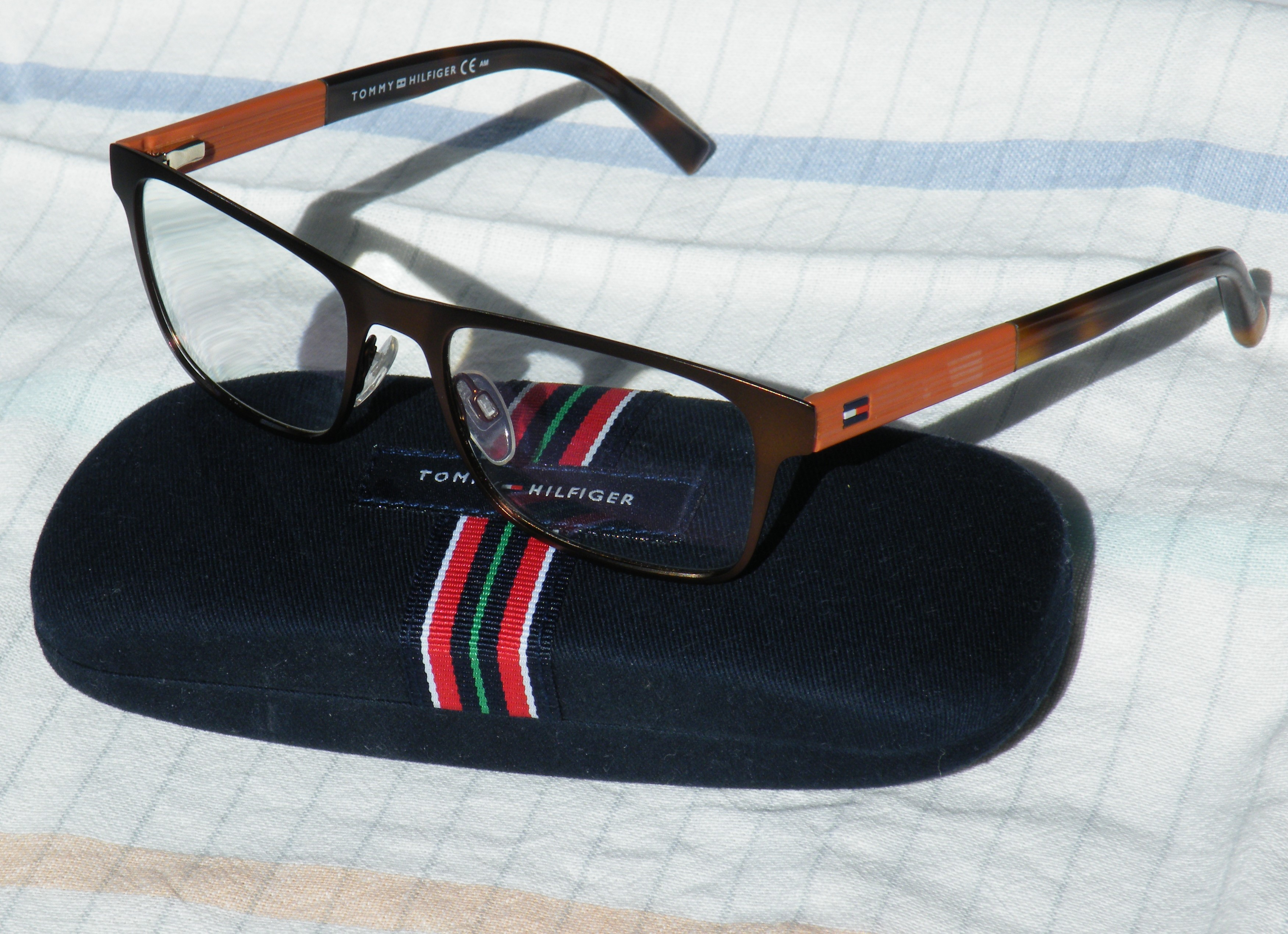
Tommy Hilfiger designer glasses

Tommy Hilfiger's career in fashion began in 1968, when he cofounded a clothing and record store named People's Place in upstate New York. Using $150 he had saved from working at a gas station as startup money, he oversaw the expansion of the company into a chain of ten stores. Despite meeting with initial success, People's Place filed for bankruptcy in 1977. In 1979, Hilfiger moved to New York City to pursue a career as a fashion designer, working on several different labels including Jordache Jeans.

In the early 1980s, he met Mohan Murjani, an Indian textile magnate hoping to launch a line of men's clothing. With Murjani's backing in 1985, Hilfiger debuted his first signature collection, which featured modernized versions of button-down shirts, chinos, and other classic preppy styles. The casual and youthful attitude of these first designs would remain a trait of the company's later collections. The new clothing line made its debut with a high-profile marketing campaign, which included a large billboard in Times Square by advertiser George Lois.

The Tommy Hilfiger brand left Murjani International in 1989, with Silas Chou instead providing financial backing. That year, Lawrence Stroll and Joel Horowitz, both former executives of Ralph Lauren, were hired as executives of the newly formed company Tommy Hilfiger, Inc., which had an initial focus on casual male sportswear.

The Tommy Hilfiger Corporation went public in 1992. After licensing Pepe Jeans USA in 1995, in 1996 Tommy Hilfiger Inc. began distributing women's clothing as well. By the end of the next year, Hilfiger had opened his first store in Beverly Hills, which was followed by a store in London in 1998. The company launched its bed and bath line in 1998.

Throughout the 1990s, the company's marketing division worked in tandem with the popular music industry, and as early as 1993 Hilfiger was an official sponsor for Pete Townshend's Psychoderelict tour.

In the early 1990s a baggier, less tailored menswear look came into fashion, and Hilfiger gave his clothes a more relaxed fit. As roomier styles with oversized logos became popular with hip-hop artists in the mid-to-late 1990s,

Hilfiger's style of clothing became both increasingly popular with the American "preppy" scene and as hip hop fashion, and when Snoop Dogg wore a Hilfiger sweatshirt during an appearance on Saturday Night Live in the 1990s; it sold out of New York City stores the next day. Hilfiger courted the new hip hop market, and rappers like Puff Daddy and Coolio attended his runway shows. The clothes were marketed in connection with the music industry, with collections often influenced by the fashion of music subcultures, and American R&B singer Aaliyah became the spokesperson for Tommy Hilfiger Corporation in 1997.

In 1997, the company sponsored Sheryl Crow's If It Makes You Happy tour. In 1999, it sponsored both Britney Spears' ...Baby One More Time Tour. and Lenny Kravitz's Freedom tour.

=== 21st century ===
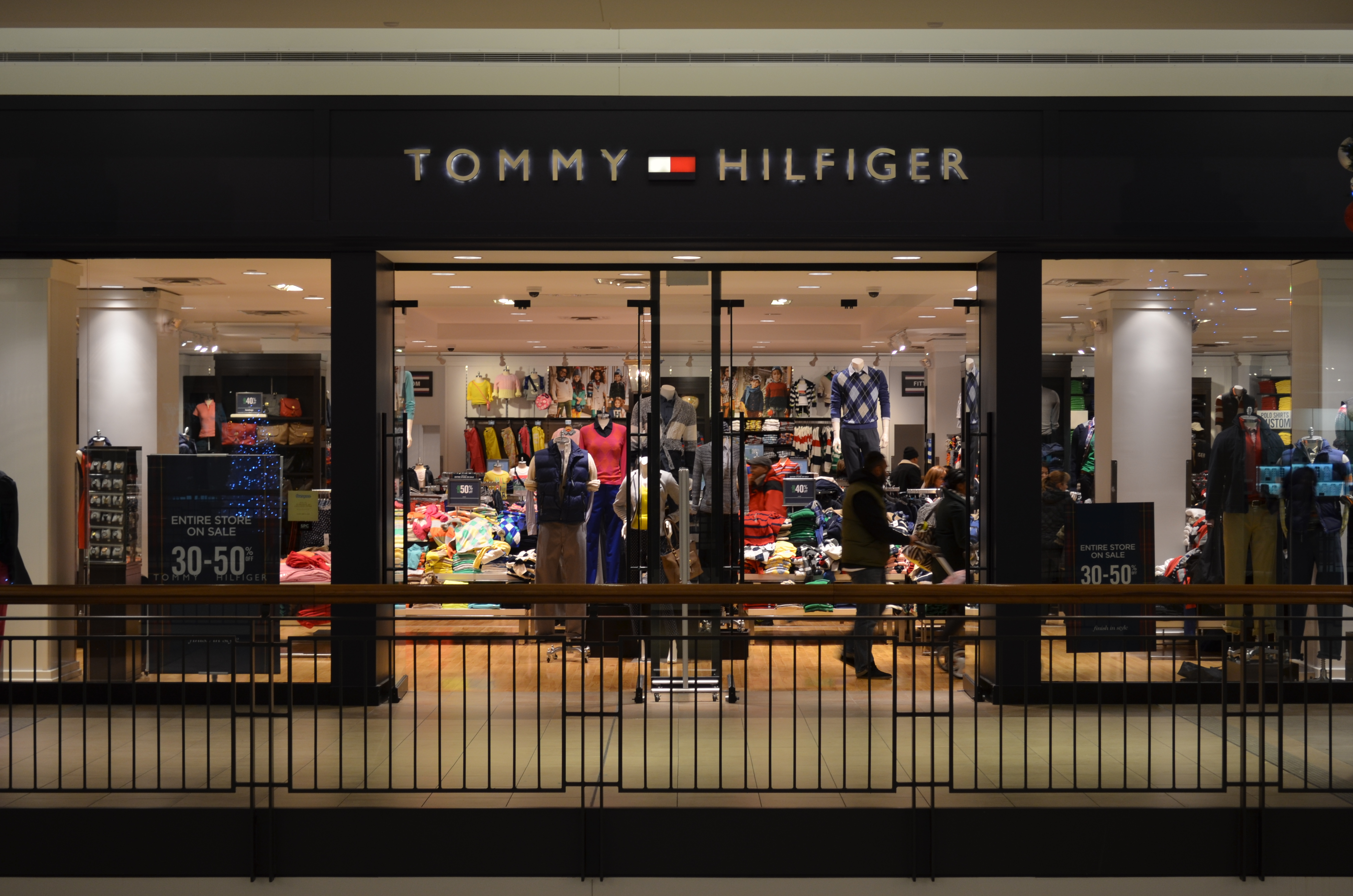
Tommy Hilfiger storefront inside Fairview Mall in Toronto in 2014

In 2001, women's intimate apparel was introduced. After sales and net income faltered in 2001, the company's sales in 2002 totaled $1.87 billion. Overall between 2000 and 2009, sales slipped from around $1.9 billion to $700 million. During the same time period, however, Hilfiger's European sales steadily rose to $1.13 billion. In 2003, Hilfiger executive Fred Gehring and Hilfiger decided to further invest in the brand's growing overseas audience by re-focusing on the brand's original style, "classic American cool," and designing the clothes out of New York City. Gehring also adapted the business model to suit European retail culture, pursuing partnerships with European department stores and with smaller boutiques, signing 4,500 of them in 15 countries. Hilfiger also strove to retain the designer brand exclusivity of the Hilfiger label by signing a deal to distribute the best-selling Hilfiger lines at Macy's only.

Hilfiger has endorsed products such as True Star, a fragrance, which was released in 2004 with Beyoncé Knowles as poster girl. True Star would go on to win a FiFi Award for Best New Commercial Fragrance. By 2004, the Tommy Hilfiger Corporation company had revenues of approximately $1.8 billion and 5,400 employees. In 2006, Tommy Hilfiger sold Tommy Hilfiger Inc. for $1.6 billion, or $16.80 a share, to Apax Partners, a private investment company. After the acquisition Gehring assumed control of the American headquarters of Tommy Hilfiger as well as Europe. Gehring and Hilfiger narrowed their focus in the United States to the profitable core sportswear line, and U.S. sales began to rise in 2010.

In March 2010, Phillips-Van Heusen (PVH Corp.) bought the Tommy Hilfiger Corporation for $3 billion, in a deal that was nearly seven times what PVH had paid for Calvin Klein in 2003. Fred Gehring, who launched Hilfiger's European division in 1996, assumed the role of Hilfiger's CEO. Daniel Grieder was appointed CEO of Tommy Hilfiger Group in July 2014. Former CEO Gehring was made executive chairman of Tommy Hilfiger Group and was appointed vice chairman of PVH.

In January 2015, Tommy Hilfiger debuted a digital sales showroom at its New York City headquarters, which the publication WGSN opined would "transform the traditional buying process." With plans to open showrooms in other cities, Hilfiger described the showroom as "an innovation of the order process with cost saving potentials along the whole value chain."

In August 2015, Gehring stepped down as Tommy Hilfiger Group's chairman, though he retained his role at PVH. Tommy Hilfiger remains the company's principal designer, leading the design teams and overseeing the entire creative process.

In 2020, PVH announced that as part of their animal welfare policy, the company does not use exotic skins and would be banning their use in Tommy Hilfiger collections when "our annual update of that policy is released."

In 2021, Tommy Hilfiger released their first genderless collection in collaboration with Indya Moore.

== Product lines ==
Tommy Hilfiger delivers its products worldwide under the Tommy Hilfiger and Hilfiger Denim brands, and also has a breadth of collections including Hilfiger Collection, Tommy Hilfiger Tailored, men's, women's and kid's sportswear, denim, accessories, and footwear. In addition, the brand is licensed for a range of products such as fragrances, eyewear, watches, and home furnishings.

- Tommy Hilfiger – the main line of the Tommy Hilfiger Corporation, like the company's other lines it is influenced by classic American fashion, or more specifically what the company dubs "preppy with a twist". It targets customers in the 25 to 40-year-old range.
- Hilfiger Denim – more casual than the Tommy Hilfiger label, it targets both men and women in the 18 to 30-year-old range. Beyond jeans, the line also includes denim separates, footwear, bags, accessories, eyewear, and fragrances.
- Hilfiger Collection – intended for women, the clothing line blends classic American influences with contemporary styles. The clothes are marketed towards women age 25 to 40. The designs periodically debut during New York Fashion Week.
- Tommy Hilfiger Tailored – an American menswear line meant to the 25 to 40-year-old demographic. Styles vary from formal suits to casual wear, with a focus on what the Tommy Hilfiger Group website describes as "precision fit, premium fabrics, updated cuts, rich colors, and luxe details."
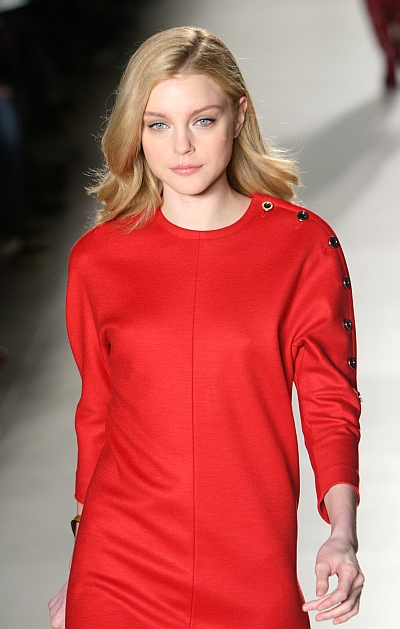

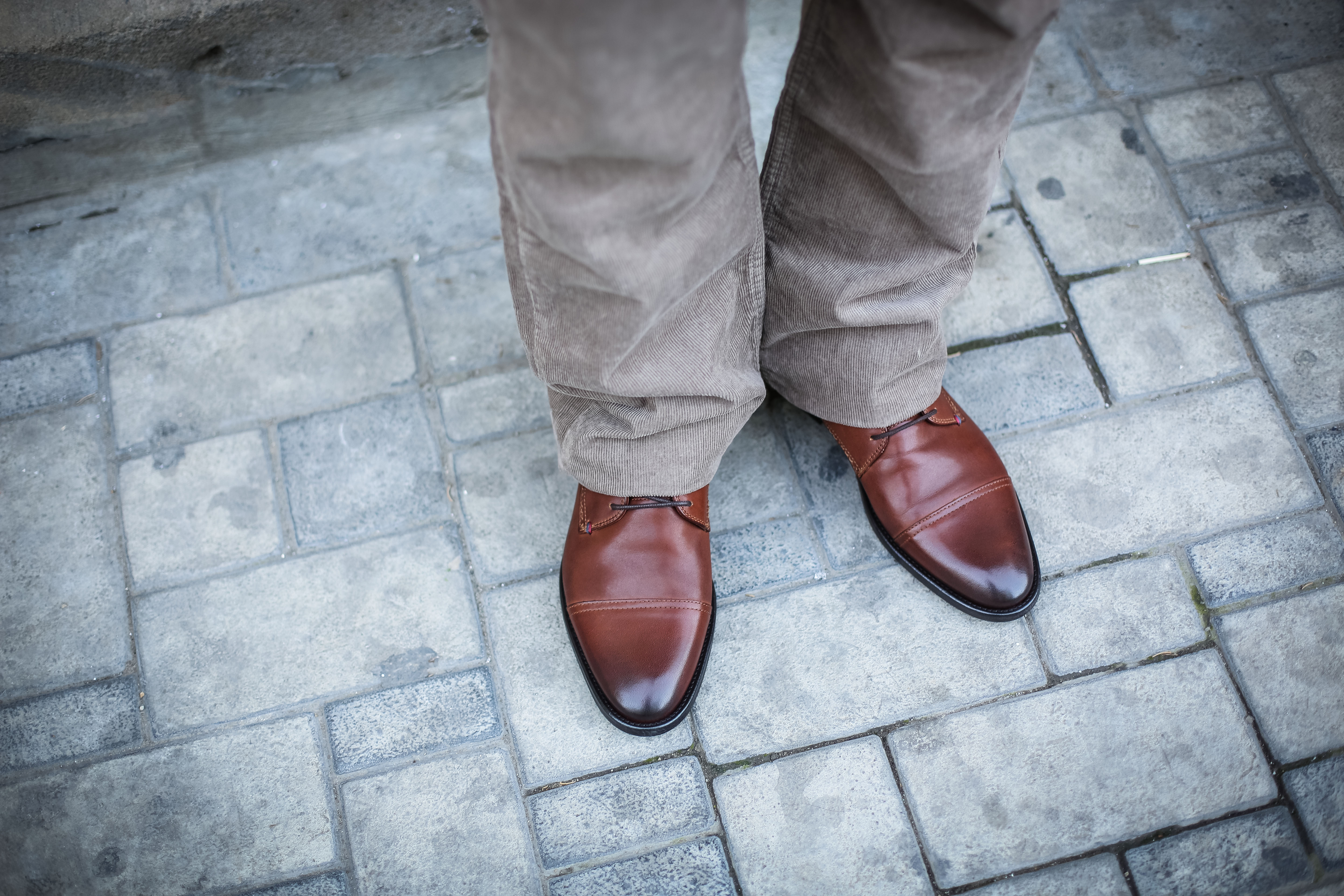

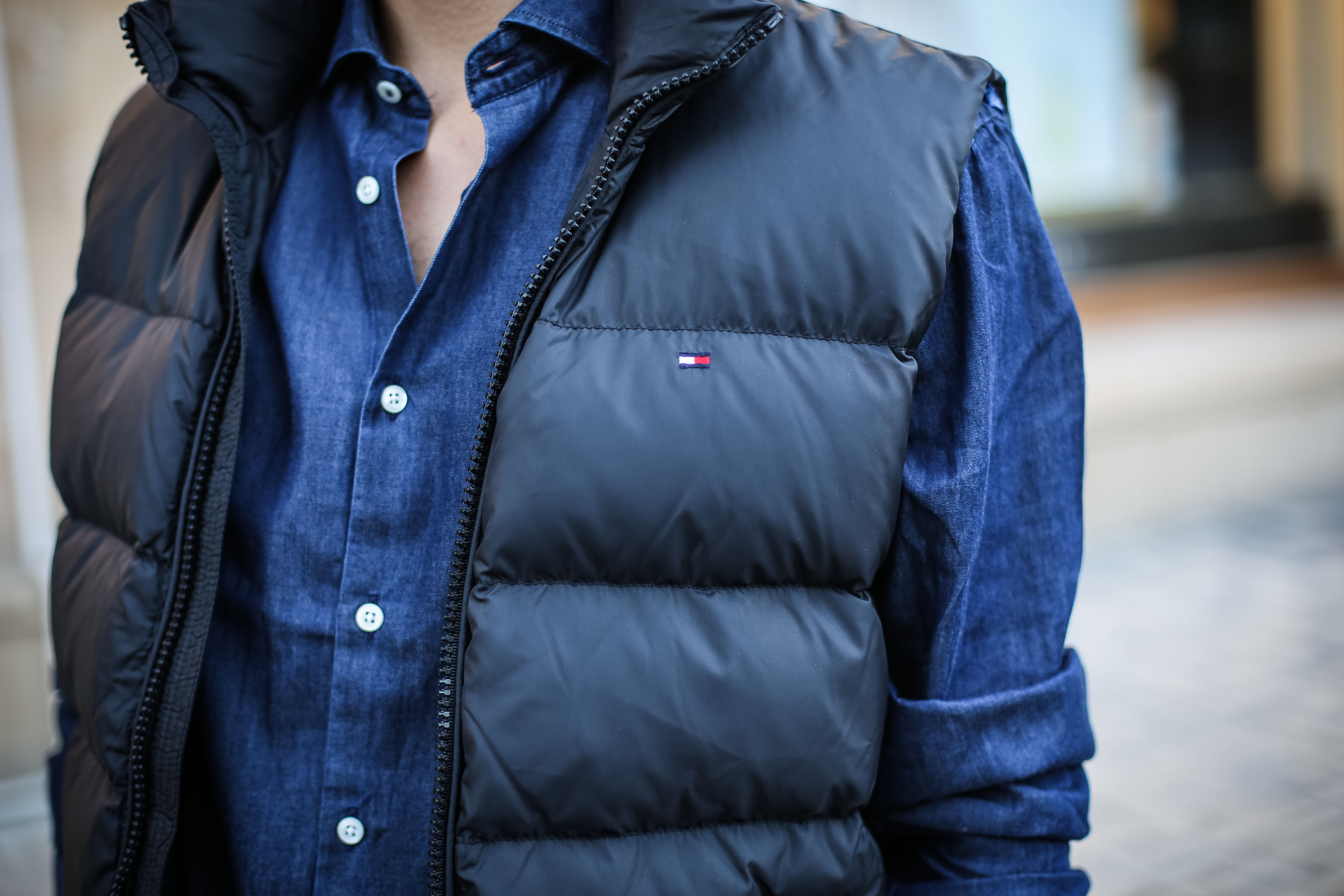

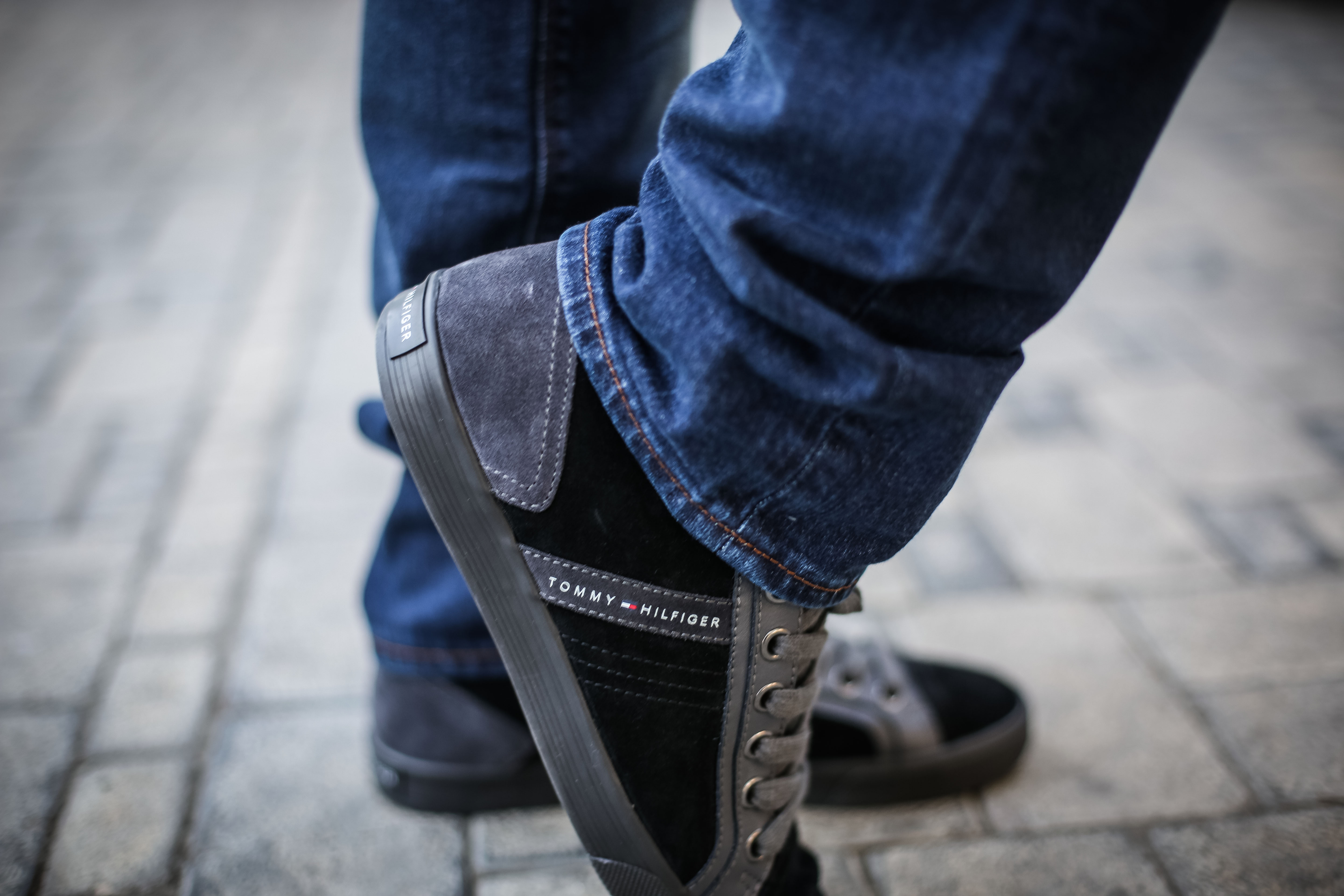

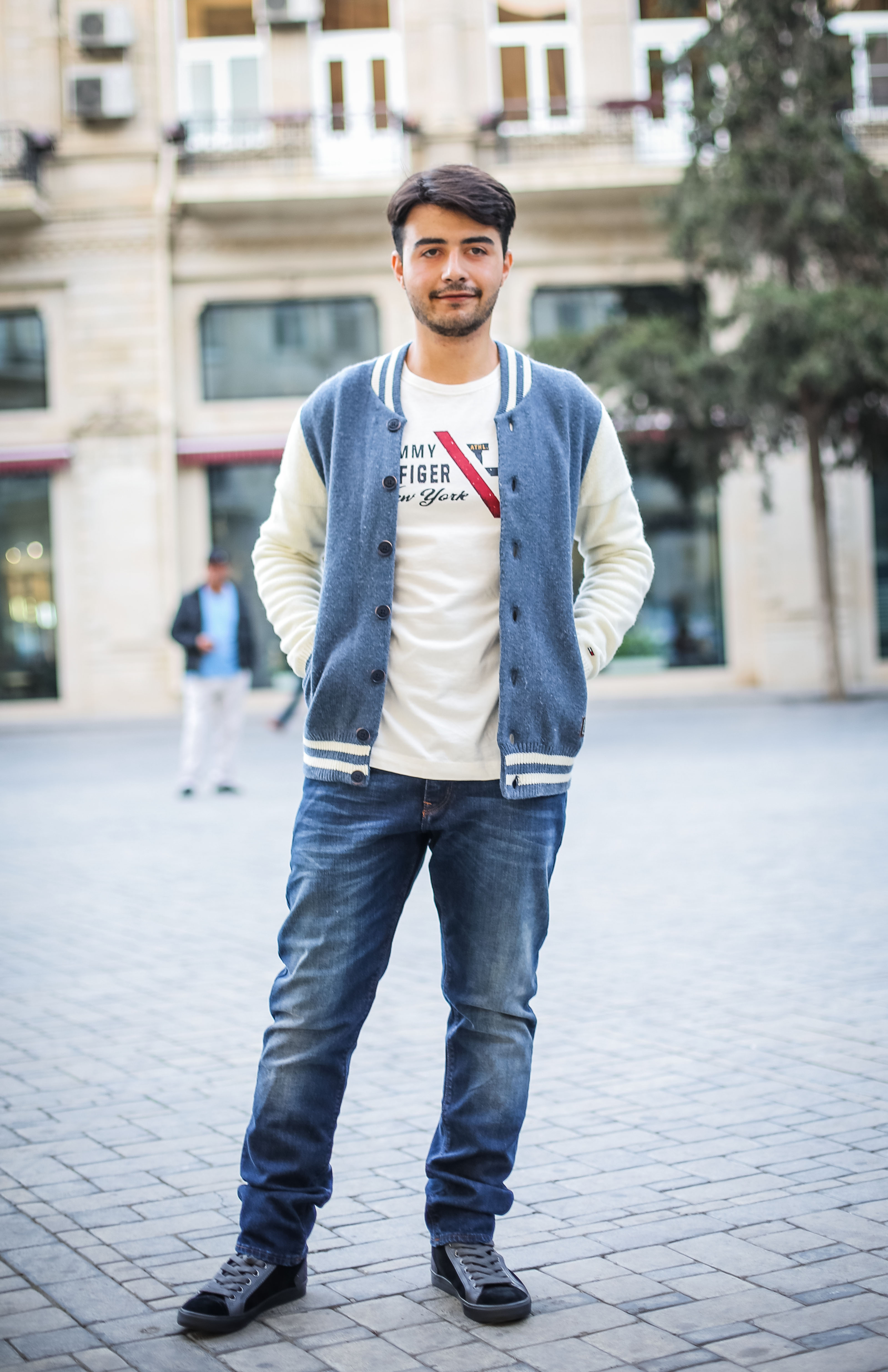

== Worker conditions ==
In the late 1990s, Tommy Hilfiger and other large American textile companies such as Calvin Klein and Sears were defendants in a class-action lawsuit alleging that luxury clothes were being manufactured in sweatshop conditions in Saipan. After a group settlement that admitted no liability, in March 2000, Tommy Hilfiger volunteered to allow independent oversight of their manufacturing on the island. In March 2012, ABC aired a report that 29 workers had died in a factory fire in 2011 in Bangladesh, with the Tommy Hilfiger Corporation included among the factory's clients. PVH Corp. issued a press release in response, stating they would commit $1 million to a two-year program to help facilitate safety programs. The company, however, announced they would not abandon their manufacturing in Bangladesh, with PVH CEO Emanuel Chirico stating that the brand was instead "trying for a global solution" and staying at the factories to affect change, as "you need to have a voice at the table to get changes made as you go forward." Tommy Hilfiger later signed a Bangladeshi safety accord along with eighty other Western retailers, with the goal of protecting unionizers.

In 2014, PVH was consulting about investing in Ethiopia in relation to Tommy Hilfiger and Calvin Klein, with labor rights among the key talking points. In 2016, the India Committee of the Netherlands (ICN) reported that textile workers in Bangalore were working in conditions akin to slavery. Clothing companies H&M, Inditex, C&A and PVH publicly committed to "improving the lives of workers in Bengaluru" after the report, while PVH also announced it would independently investigate and establish new guidelines for its suppliers.

Research accuses Hilfiger receiving and distributing products out of Chinese forced labour camps for Uyghur people. The Zhejiang Sunrise Garment Group Co. plays a key role in production by running the business.

== Advertising ==
Logo

In 1985, to help him launch his first collection, Hilfiger hired advertiser and graphic designer George Lois to make a billboard for the center of Times Square in New York City. Instead of models, the ad featured the initials of three well-known fashion designers—"PE" (Perry Ellis), "RL" (Ralph Lauren), "CK" (Calvin Klein), and announced that "TH" (Tommy Hilfiger) was the next great menswear designer. The billboard created a stir in the fashion press and succeeded in creating awareness of the Hilfiger name. In subsequent years Hilfiger and Lois collaborated again on other ads for the Hilfiger brand. One campaign, in 1990, compared Hilfiger's American style with other "iconic American" classics, such as the 1955 Ford Thunderbird and the 1940 Harley-Davidson bike. Hilfiger courted the new hip hop market in the 1990s, and rappers like Puffy and Coolio walked during its runways shows.

From 2002 to 2006, Tommy Hilfiger owned the naming rights to the Tommy Hilfiger at Jones Beach Theatre amphitheater on Long Island, one of the more popular music venues in the United States. Starting in 2010, in collaboration with New York advertising firm Laird & Partners, Tommy Hilfiger Corporation launched the advertising campaign "The Hilfigers". The campaign features a fictional family of Hilfigers wearing the brand's clothing in fun preppy venues. The first campaign, for fall 2010, was a photoset of a college football tailgate, followed by photoshoots at a tennis court, a rustic holiday party, a camping trip, an Ivy League college, and the beaches of Malibu.

The brand created the publicity tour "Prep World" in 2011, which featured specialty pop-up shops in Paris, New York, London, Stockholm, Los Angeles, Madrid, Milan, the German island Sylt, and the Belgian town of Knokke. Hilfiger made personal appearances with author and preppy expert Lisa Birnbach, as well as designing a special clothing collection to support the initiative. The brand's 30th anniversary was in 2015, and the company celebrated the occasion with a fashion tour. Among other events, in Beijing in May 2015 the brand recreated their New York Fashion Week runway show internationally for the first time. The couple Olivia Palermo and Johannes Huebl were also brought in as guest editors for the summer 2015 women's and men's collections. For the fall of 2015, Rafael Nadal is the brand ambassador for Tommy Hilfiger underwear and Tommy Hilfiger Tailored collections. 2015 collections included wedding and American football themes. In February 2015, the football collection was displayed in an American football stadium for fall and winter.

Zendaya was the global women's ambassador for the spring of 2019. She also designed a Tommy x Zendaya capsule collection.

William Chan was the global brand spokesperson for menswear in 2021.

In 2024, Léna Situations became the new Tommy Hilfiger ambassador.

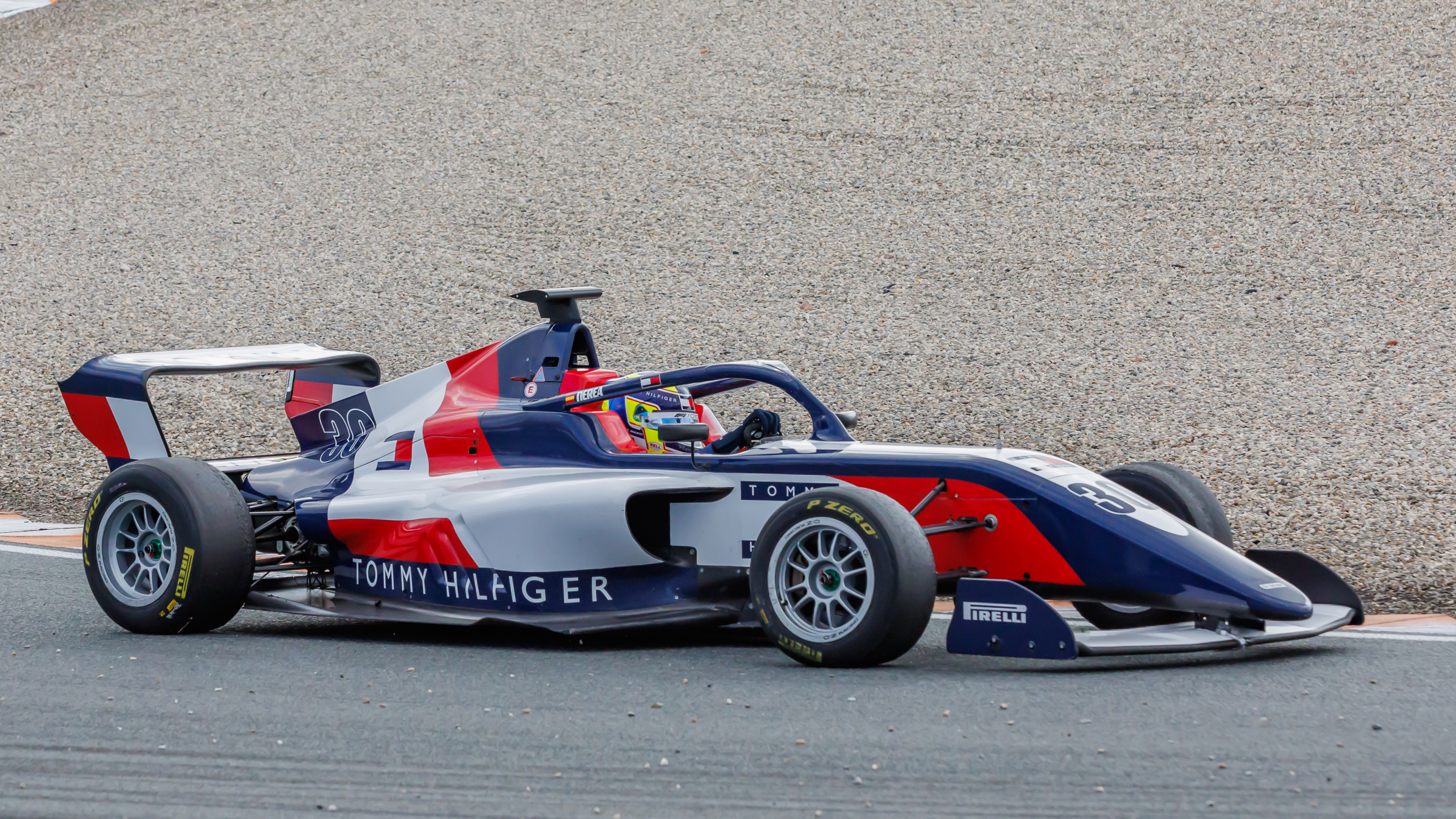
The Tommy Hilfiger F1 Academy car

The brand has been involved in Formula One, having sponsored Team Lotus, Scuderia Ferrari and Mercedes. The brand also has been sponsoring multi-time Formula One World Champion Lewis Hamilton. In 2024, the brand signed a partnership deal with F1 Academy, an all-female Formula 4-level racing series founded by Formula One aimed to focus on developing and preparing young female drivers to progress to higher levels of competition. The brand will also support Nerea Martí for the 2024 F1 Academy season.

== Locations ==
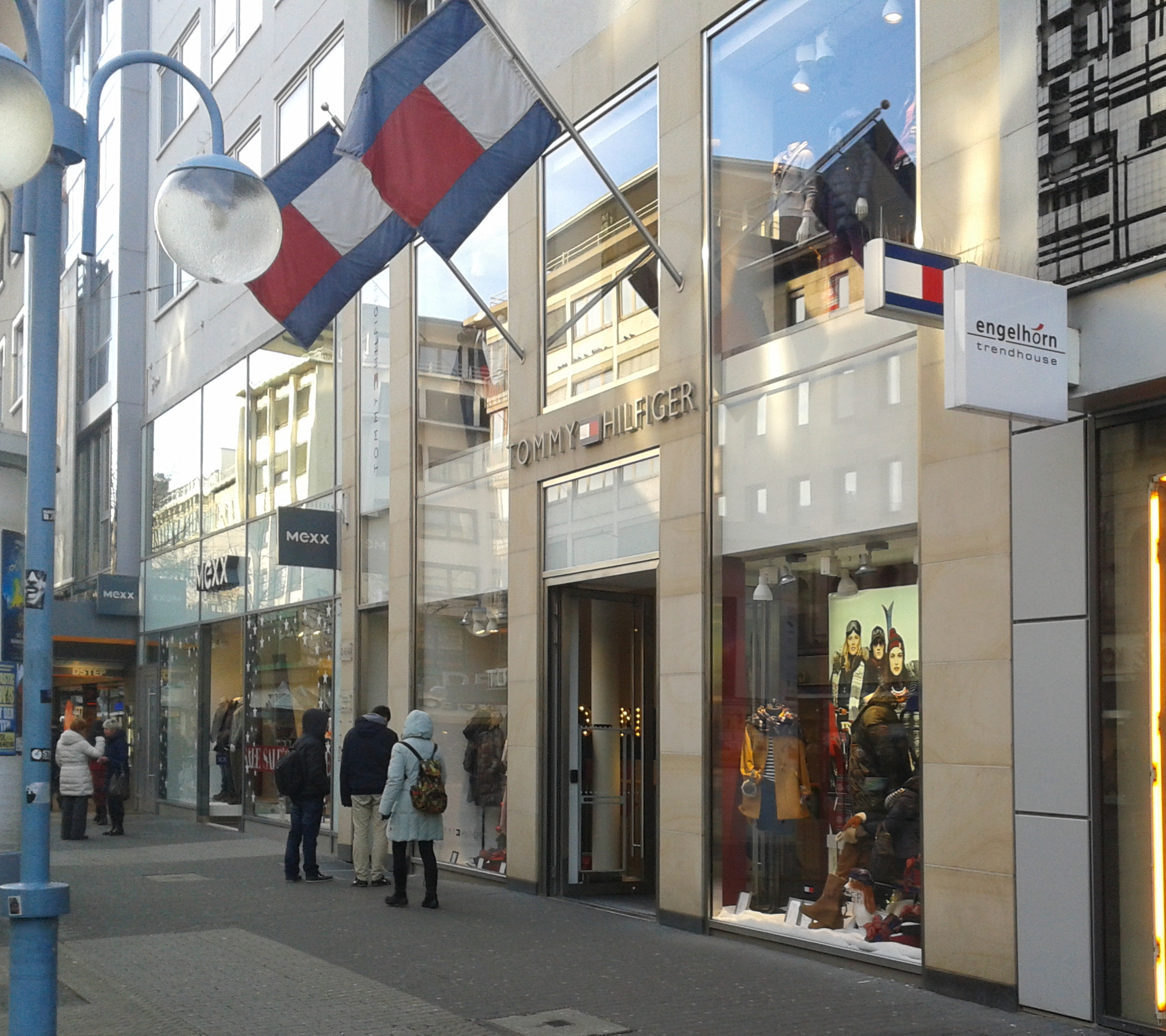
A Tommy Hilfiger storefront in Mannheim, Germany

With a head office in Amsterdam, the Tommy Hilfiger Corporation has global flagship stores in the following seven locations:

- Fifth Avenue, New York City (opened September 2009)
- Champs-Élysées, Paris (opened November 2010)
- Brompton Road, London (opened August 2011)
- Omotesandō, Tokyo (opened April 2012)
- Regent Street, London (opened November 2012)
- Robertson Boulevard, Los Angeles (opened February 2013)
- Schadowstraße, Düsseldorf (opened August 2013)

The company often operates hundreds of stores in the larger countries, and the subsidiary Tommy Hilfiger Japan Corp., for example, operates 170 stores with 1,000 employees as of 2014. In 2015, the brand launched its first store in Thailand. In November 2022, the company launched the first flagship store in Latin America in the city of Bogotá, being the 24th store in Colombia.

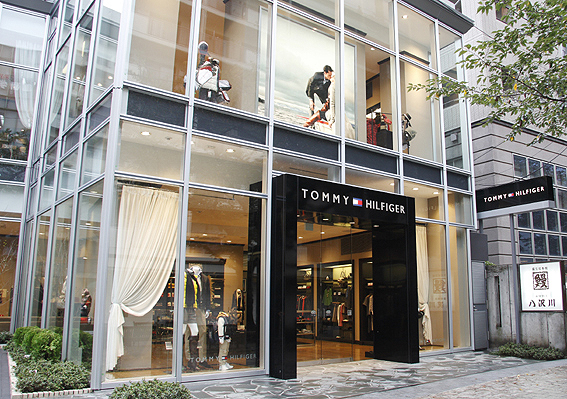
Store in the Tokyo neighborhood of Jiyūgaoka, Japan in 2008

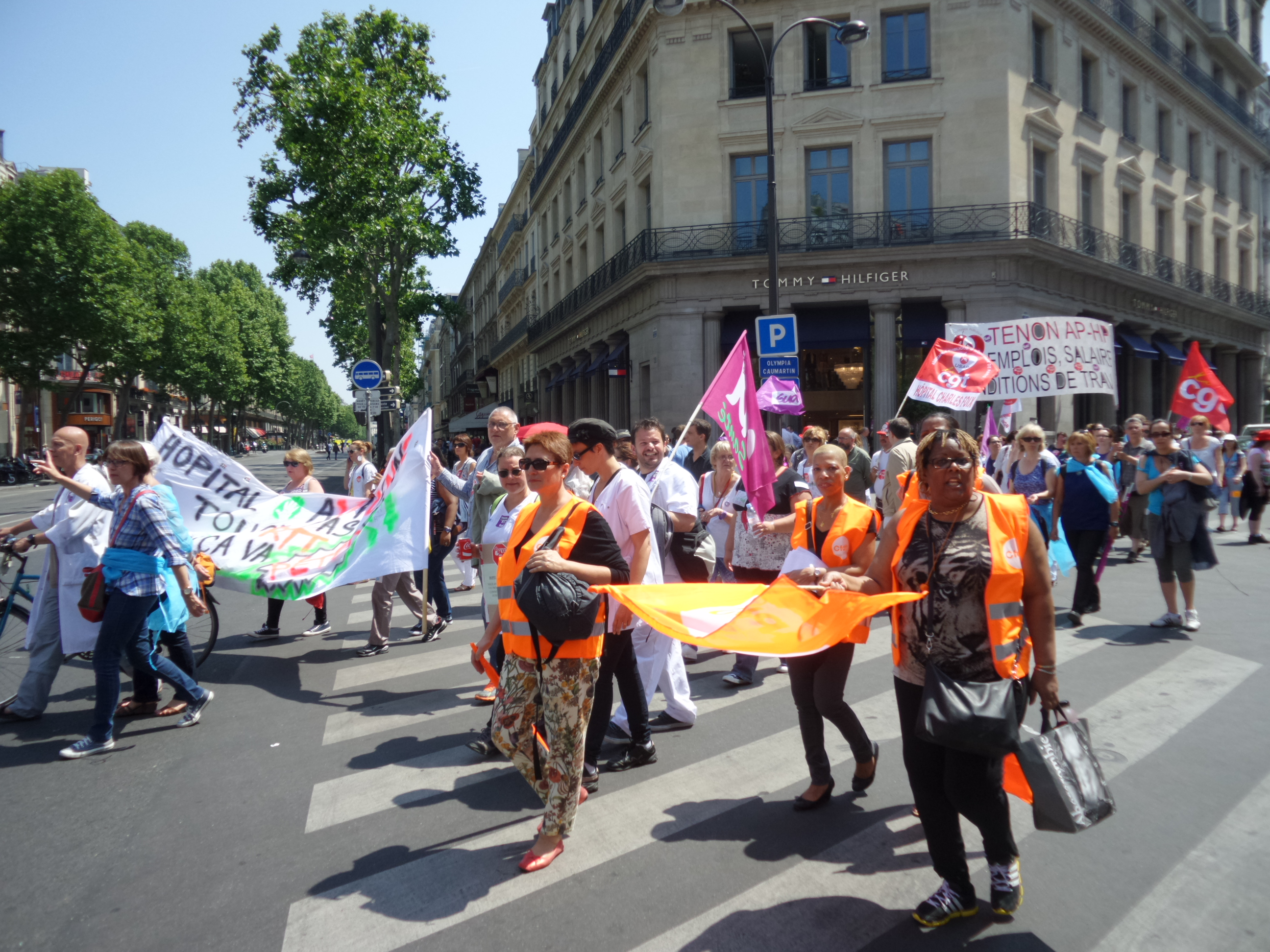
Flagship store in Paris, France in 2015

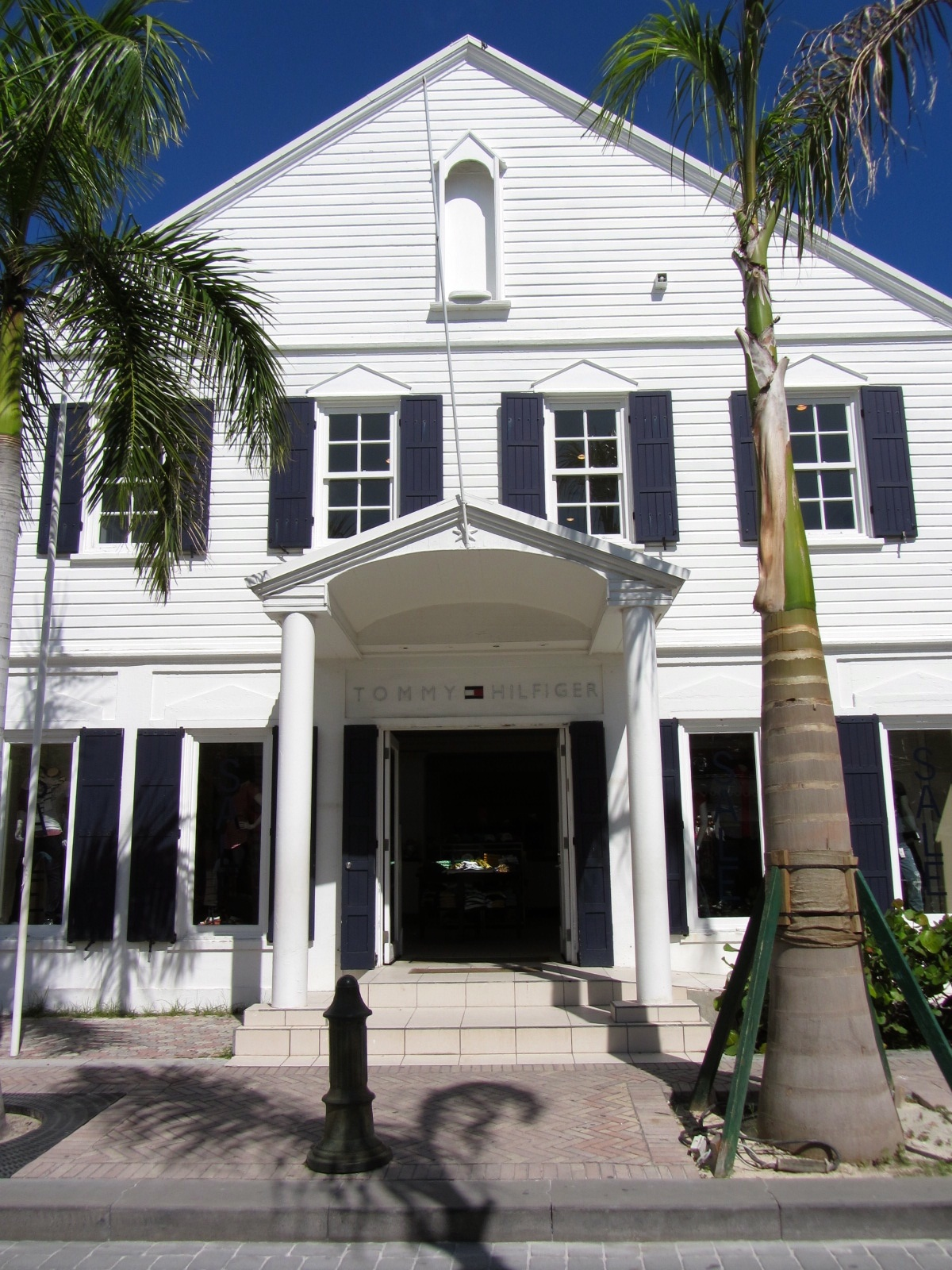
Store pictured in 2011

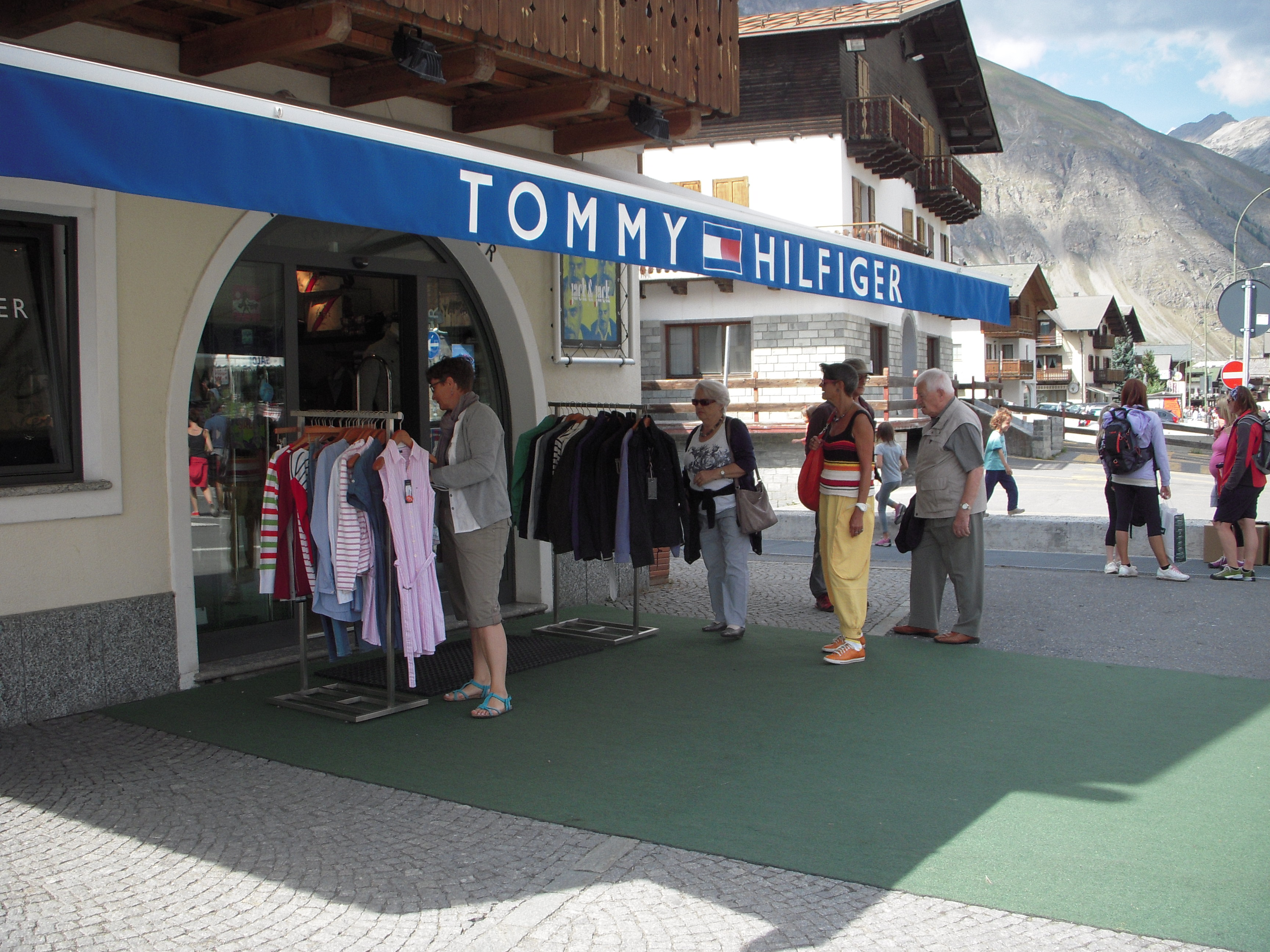
Store in Livigno, Italy in 2012

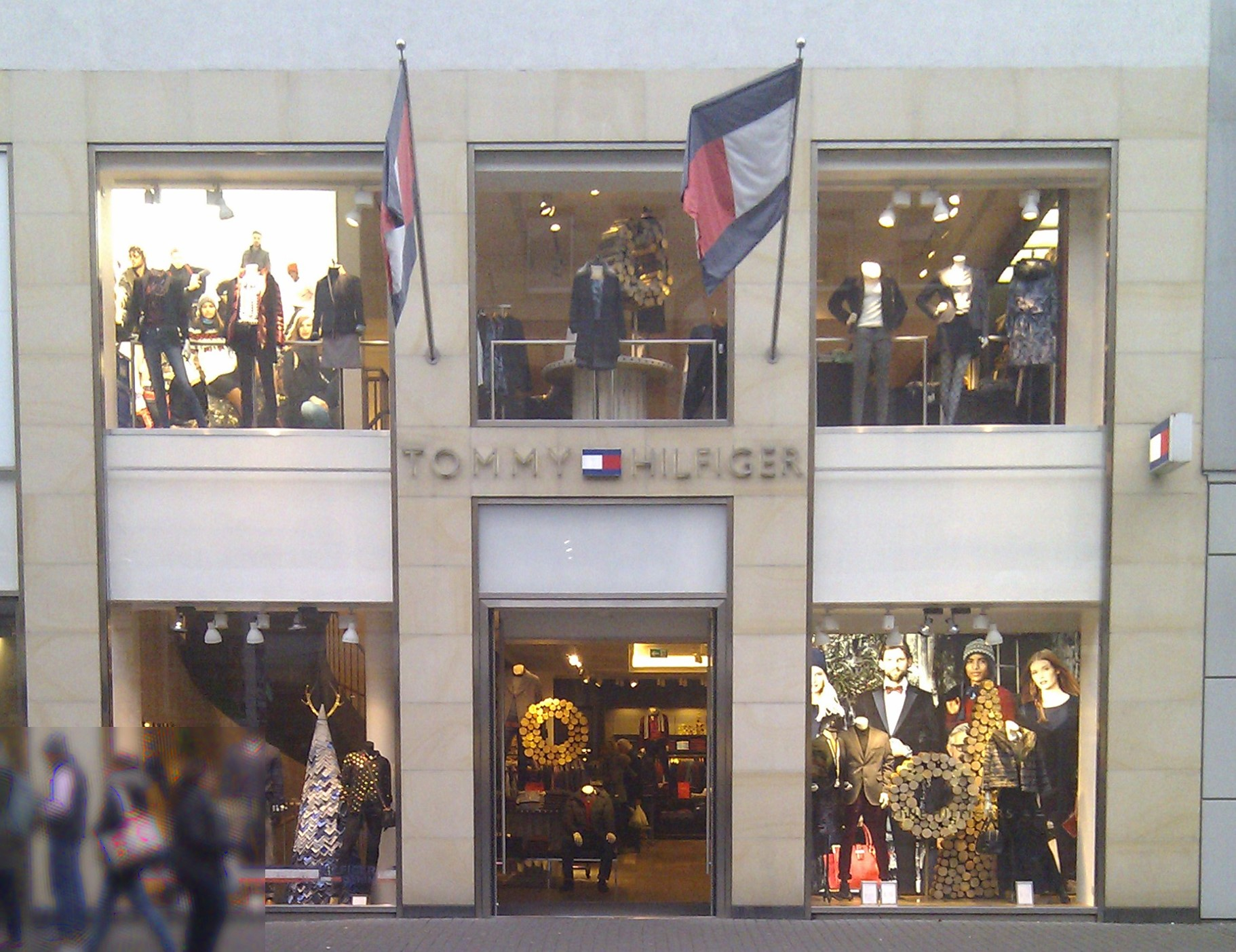
Store in Mannheim in 2014

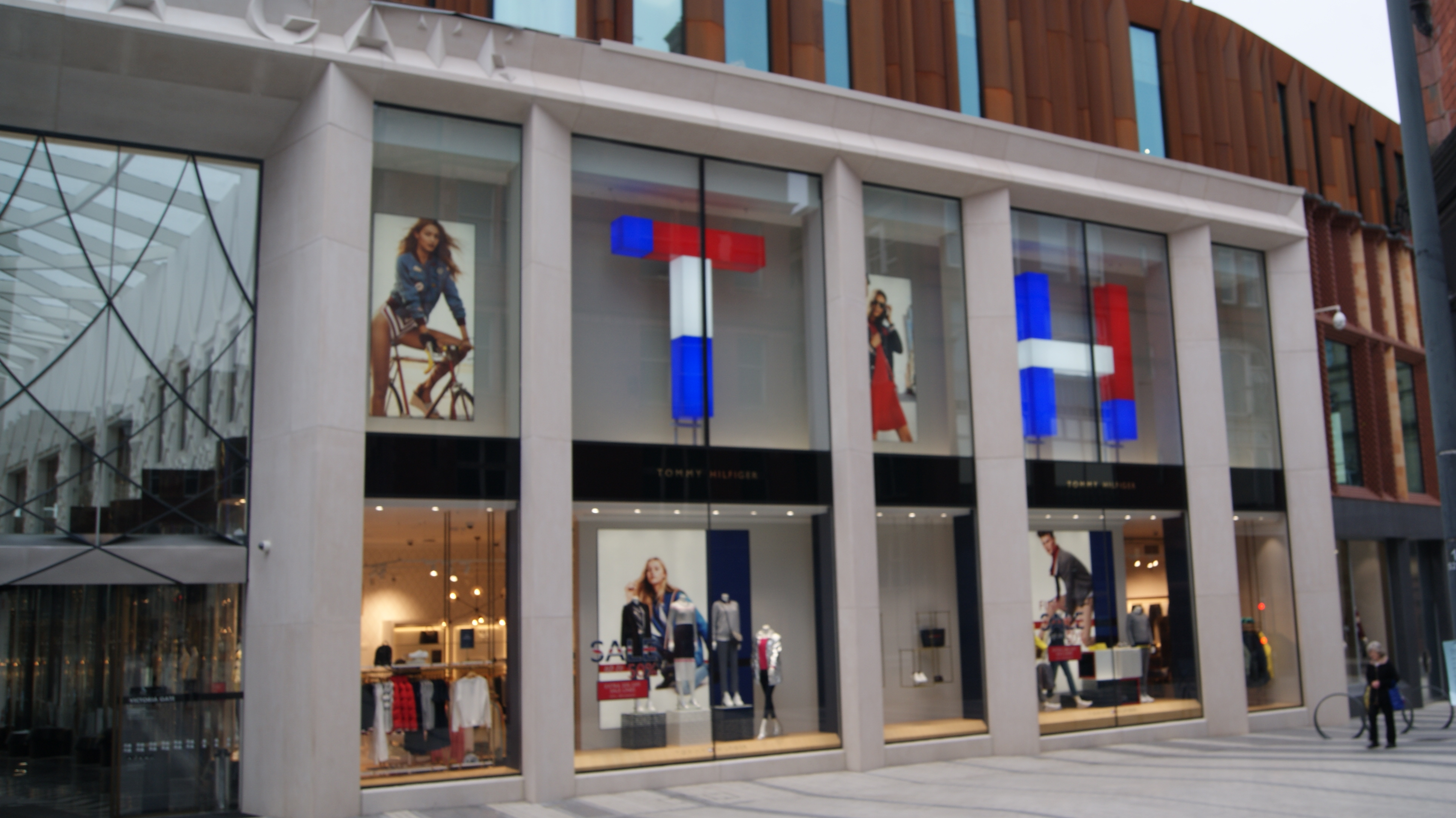
Branch in Leeds showing current branding in 2017

== See also ==
- List of fashion designers
- Nautical style
- Preppy style
