= Petit Bateau =

French clothing brand

- Trade name: Petit Bateau
- Type: Public
- Industry: Textile
- Founded: 1920; 106 years ago
- Founder: Pierre Valton
- Headquarters: Troyes, France
- Area served: Worldwide
- Key people: Alexandre Rubin (CEO)
- Products: Clothes; Underwear
- Brands: Petit Bateau
- Revenue: €240 million in 2024
- Owner: Regent L.P.
- Number of employees: Nearly 4,000 employees, of which 1,100 in Aube
- Website: www.petit-bateau.com

Petit Bateau (French pronunciation: [p(ə)ti bato]) is a French brand of clothing and underwear mainly for children founded in 1920, whose origins date back to 1893, in Troyes, Aube. Integrated into the Rocher Group since 1988, Petit Bateau was a children's brand which became trans-generational in the 2000s thanks to the launch of the adult collection.

== History ==
In 1893 Pierre Valton opened, in a 3,700 m^{2} workshop, the Valton-Quinquarlet & Sons hosiery factory, which specialized in underwear, especially in underpants and vests. Established in the Aube, capital of the French textile industry in the nineteenth century, at that time the Saint-Joseph factory in Troyes manufactured the entire production. In 1918 Étienne, the founder's son, invented underpants without legs and buttons and replaced the rough wool by white unbleached cotton. For greater convenience, he replaced the buttons by an elastic band at the waist and the thighs. However, the brand used the term "panties", which referred more to women's or children's underwear.

Valton was inspired by the nursery rhyme Maman les p'tits bateaux (Mummy the little boats) for the name of this new underwear, and he registered it as his trademark. The Petit Bateau brand was thus registered in 1920 by the Valton-Quinquarlet company, and was symbolized at that time by the drawing of a little girl nicknamed Marinette. At the 1937 Universal Exhibition in Paris, the company won the "Grand Prix de l'innovation" but it was really after the Second World War that the company developed and diversified its product range.

In the late 1980s the company was on the verge of filing for bankruptcy; it was acquired in 1988 by the Rocher Group, formerly the Yves Rocher Group, which beat a BNP bid. The Rocher Group also includes Yves Rocher, Stanhome, Pierre Ricaud, Daniel Jouvance, Kiotis, ID Parfums, Flomar and Sabon.

In the middle of the 1990s, in the midst of a minimalist trend, Petit Bateau became a “fashionable” brand: Karl Lagerfeld had Claudia Schiffer walk the catwalk in a Petit Bateau T-shirt under his Chanel suit, and success was immediate. The child's T-shirt she wore was then made available in adult sizes. T-shirt sales increased tenfold over the next three years. In 1994 Petit Bateau put on a fashion show. The designers seized on the child's white T-shirt and made it a fashion phenomenon. This event marked the entrance of the brand into the ready-to-wear market for adults.

In 2000 Petit Bateau opened its flagship store on the Champs-Elysées in Paris. In 2013 Gildas Loaëc and Masaya Kuroki were named artistic directors of the adult collections.

Today, Petit Bateau is a brand of clothing and underwear. Present in Europe, Japan, China, the Middle East, Russia and the United States, its products are sold in nearly 400 Petit Bateau shops, 4,300 partner stores and also on its e-commerce website launched in 2006.

All the collections are devised by the style teams located in Paris.

== Petit Bateau's inventions ==
=== The little panties ===
Until the early 1900s, children and adults wore long woollen underpants, uncomfortable and unhygienic. Étienne Valton, son of the company's founder Pierre Valton and father of 13 children, listening to the nursery rhyme “Maman les p'tits bateaux” ("Mummy, do the little boats on the water have legs?”), had the idea of cutting off the legs of the long underpants of the time. The famous washable cotton panties were born. For greater convenience, the buttons were replaced by an elastic band at the waist and thighs.

Étienne Valton was also inspired by this nursery rhyme for the brand's name, and he registered the trademark "Petit Bateau" in 1920.

In 1937 the Petit Bateau panties received the "Grand Prix of Innovation" at the Universal Exhibition of Paris. They gradually became more accessible and became part of the everyday life of women, emancipating them from the thick woollen undergarments worn in the nineteenth century.

Today 3.5 million pairs of Petit Bateau cotton panties, requiring 2,520 metres of pure cotton yarn and a natural rubber elastic, are sold a year and they are worn by celebrities like Jane Birkin and Inès de La Fressange.

=== The bodysuit ===
It was by observing the special armholes of T-shirts worn by American soldiers, who could put on their underwear without taking off their helmets, that Petit Bateau invented its first baby bodysuits in 1950, designed for ease and practicality. The Valton family devised a new way of putting on children's clothes: over the head, thanks to a more oval neckline. In 1980 the Valton family continued to revisit the traditional bodysuit for babies by creating the first model with press stud closure between the legs to further facilitate the dressing and movement of toddlers.

=== Materials ===
Terry velours was born in 1960 in the Petit Bateau workshops. It is mainly used for children's pyjamas for its qualities of thermal insulation.

Terry cloth bouclette, also mainly used by Petit Bateau for pyjamas or for bathing accessories and childcare items, has a soft feel and offers a high level of wearing comfort.

In 1970, the brand introduced a pinstripe cotton fabric made using two-thread knitting process that required specialized machinery. The fabric used approximately 1,000 metres of yarn per kilogram and became associated with the brand's children's clothing.

In 1990 the warmth of wool yarn was added to the softness of cotton when Petit Bateau created a new wool and cotton fabric that combined the properties of both materials, softness and warmth, designed to protect children from their outside environment.

=== Finishes ===
The picot stitch and cocotte stitch are part of the identity finishes of the Petit Bateau brand.

The picot stitch forms a free mini-loop, while the cocotte stitch is composed of tight stitches made by a procedure specifically invented by Petit Bateau in the 1960s.

== Petit Bateau icons ==
Petit Bateau collections are rooted in nautical style and incorporate certain enduring items. Aside from the brand's inventions (panties, pinstripe cotton, terry velours), other garments are now considered iconic and are permanent features in new collections. The Breton “marinière” striped top, the T-shirt, the vest top, the panties, the waxed raincoat and the peacoat are some of the essentials that the brand renews each season for children as well as adults.

The Breton striped top made its appearance in the Petit Bateau collections during the 1995 spring-summer season. Since then, the brand has made it evolve each season in its cuts (round or admiral neckline, or American armholes) and its colours.

Inspired by fishermen's oiled cloth coats, Petit Bateau's yellow waxed raincoat was created in the summer of 1996. The brand now uses this element of the seafaring wardrobe in each of its collections. It revisits it with new colours and new forms, and has singled out this product of its range by using pinstripe cotton for its lining.

The Petit Bateau T-shirt was originally an undergarment, born 120 years ago in Troyes, initially in wool, then in premium cotton. In the mid-1990s, in the midst of a minimalist trend, Petit Bateau became a fashionable brand: Karl Lagerfeld had Claudia Schiffer walk the catwalk in a Petit Bateau T-shirt under his Chanel suit; the success was immediate. Underwear for children, the white Petit Bateau T-shirt became an outer garment, a new fashion icon worn by adults. Fuelling the phenomenon, the brand sent T-shirts to fashion editors, produced the model in adult sizes and launched its range of coloured T-shirts in 1996, to offer less " babyish " colours, such as black. Sales of T-shirts increased tenfold over the next three years and Petit Bateau made its entrance into the adult clothing department at Printemps Haussmann in 1999.

Today, sales of the Petit Bateau T-shirt amount to four million a year. While the children's size range has been maintained to keep the house spirit, it has been extended to age 18 to dress adults as well. Since the 2000s collections have been developed specifically for adults.

== Advertising ==
=== Early campaigns ===
Petit Bateau was one of the first brands to use advertising, which it has done since 1920. Marinette, an imaginary character designed by the English illustrator Beatrice Mallet, represented the company for thirty years. Her look historically anchored the brand in its playful advertising. The brand has since focused on this style of marketing, stating they have always put the "energy, creativity and freedom of children at the heart of its message."

=== Turning point ===
Since the early 1990s Petit Bateau has worked with the BETC agency in the construction of its advertising campaigns. In 1994 the campaign "Don't do this, don't do that", punctuated by the song of Jacques Dutronc, changed the face of advertising for children. The public discovered in these commercials the slogan "What's the use of having clothes if you can't do anything in them?" and the rallying cry "Petit Bateau! ".

In 2004 Petit Bateau addressed itself to adults by evoking the gentleness of the world of childhood with the slogan "For adults too". Four years later, BETC created the "Les Mois" (“The Months”) campaign for Petit Bateau with the aim of reconquering the adult market; "The weight of adults in brand communication makes it impossible to talk only about children," said Muriel Fagnoni, vice-president of the agency. The slogan became "Forever" and the age of the adults was expressed in months.

In 2013 a new campaign by BETC, continuing the theme of "The Months", stressed the trans-generational dimension of Petit Bateau with the voluntarily incorrect syntax: "Never old forever", and used photographs based on energy and spontaneity: the models skip, stick out their tongues, or dance.

=== Becoming international ===
In 2015 Petit Bateau launched an advertising campaign based on the quality aspect of its products and the spontaneity of childhood. The Mini Factory commercial marked the international turning point of Petit Bateau. Created by BETC and directed by Patrick Daughters, it staged children in a secret factory that follows a fanciful production process, as if taken from a child's imagination. This film unveiled a complex process of fabrication and stress tests. In March 2016 the brand launched a printed campaign with the slogan " For serious kids " in English, which was a series of brightly colourful compositions. This campaign showed children dressing up in not very scary cardboard masks and taking over the city to live fantastic adventures.

In 2017 Petit Bateau released a new advertising film directed by Luis Cervero. The spectator followed the day of a Petit Bateau Breton stripe sweatshirt subjected to the test of children. In this advertisement, the sweatshirt accompanies the daily life of children. The commercial retains the spirit of the brand through a sequence of 72 shots in one minute, punctuated by the title line of Plastic Bertrand's Ça plane pour moi. A follower of popular melodies since its creation, its own name being inspired by the famous nursery rhyme “Maman les p'tits bateaux” (“Mummy do the little boats that go on the water have legs?”), the brand strengthened its musical identity in 2017 by reusing Jacques Dutronc's song released in 1978.

== Collaborations ==
=== Guest designers ===
Petit Bateau collaborates with many fashion brands. Guillaume Henry of Carven House, Tsumori Chisato, Didier Ludot, Cédric Charlier, Christian Lacroix, Maison Kitsuné, Jean-Charles de Castelbajac (Note: 1. In 2015, the French fashion designer and artist Jean-Charles de Castelbajac signed a capsule collection for Petit Bateau, inspired by his memories of holidays in Brittany. It featured a Breton stripe sweatshirt with patent-leather shoulders, a waxed raincoat slit on both sides for bike riding, stripes, nautical designs, and poster paint colours.) and Inès de la Fressange have created capsule collections, revisiting classic pieces in their own way. Sometimes, it is Petit Bateau which revisits the iconic pieces of other brands, as in its collaboration with K-way.

=== Guest illustrators ===
Petit Bateau has collaborated with illustrators and artists from children's publishing and contemporary culture. Collaborators have included Deyrolle, Keith Haring, Hervé Tullet and authors associate with L'École des loisirs, including Claude Ponti, Tomi Ungerer, Mario Ramos, Dorothée de Monfreid and Iris Moüy. Their work has appeared on garments such as T-shirts, underwear and bodysuits.

=== Patronage of the Palais de Tokyo's Tok Tok workshops ===
Since February 2017 Petit Bateau has supported the Palais de Tokyo in its approach to young audiences. Petit Bateau is a sponsor of the Tok-Tok activities for children aged 5 to 10 which make children aware of contemporary art by making them actors of creation themselves. Experimentation, imagination, recreation: a fun way to familiarize children with contemporary art. As part of this partnership, Petit Bateau also produces Tok-Tok videos in which artists present their work to children in a pedagogic way and invite them to create, at home, a unique creation influenced by their work.

== Production and quality ==
The company has been accused by the UFC-Que Choisir of deceiving the consumer. According to Fabienne Maleysson, the company is a "past master" in the art of making customers believe that their products are made in France, more particularly in Troyes. She estimates in her article that only 20% of the production is made in France and 80% in North Africa. This publication is criticized by Jean-Pierre Lambour, secretary of the works council; the union delegate stresses the fact that the company still employs 1,100 people in the Aube and 2,000 in France while the majority of companies in the hosiery sector have closed.

45% of the knitting and dyeing is done in the Petit Bateau St Joseph factory in Troyes, the remaining 55% being done in the Petit Bateau factory in Morocco created in 1989.

As for the manufacture, 85% of the clothes (underpants, pyjamas, panties or T-shirts) are made in the Petit Bateau factory in Marrakech and in the partner production plants in Morocco and Tunisia. As underlined by François Hollande after a visit to the workshops of the historic site of the Troyes factory in April 2017, if they had not made the decision to move a portion of their production to North Africa, Petit Bateau would no longer exist in Troyes. Regarding the remaining 15%, Petit Bateau collaborates with manufacturers with expertise complementary to that of the brand. Thus, products such as raincoats or trousers are produced by about thirty external suppliers, installed in particular in Eastern Europe and Asia.

The sustainable approach of the house also has an influence on the sales packaging, from which plastic has been banned. Petit Bateau is committed to a sustainable approach in 2017, by developing recycling between individuals based on the circular economy. Called “Faites passer les Petit Bateau”(Pass on the “Petit Bateau”) the webspace of this Petit Bateau application puts sellers and buyers of the brand's used clothing – which is deemed almost indestructible - in contact free of charge.
