= Marinière =

French blue-and-white striped cotton shirt

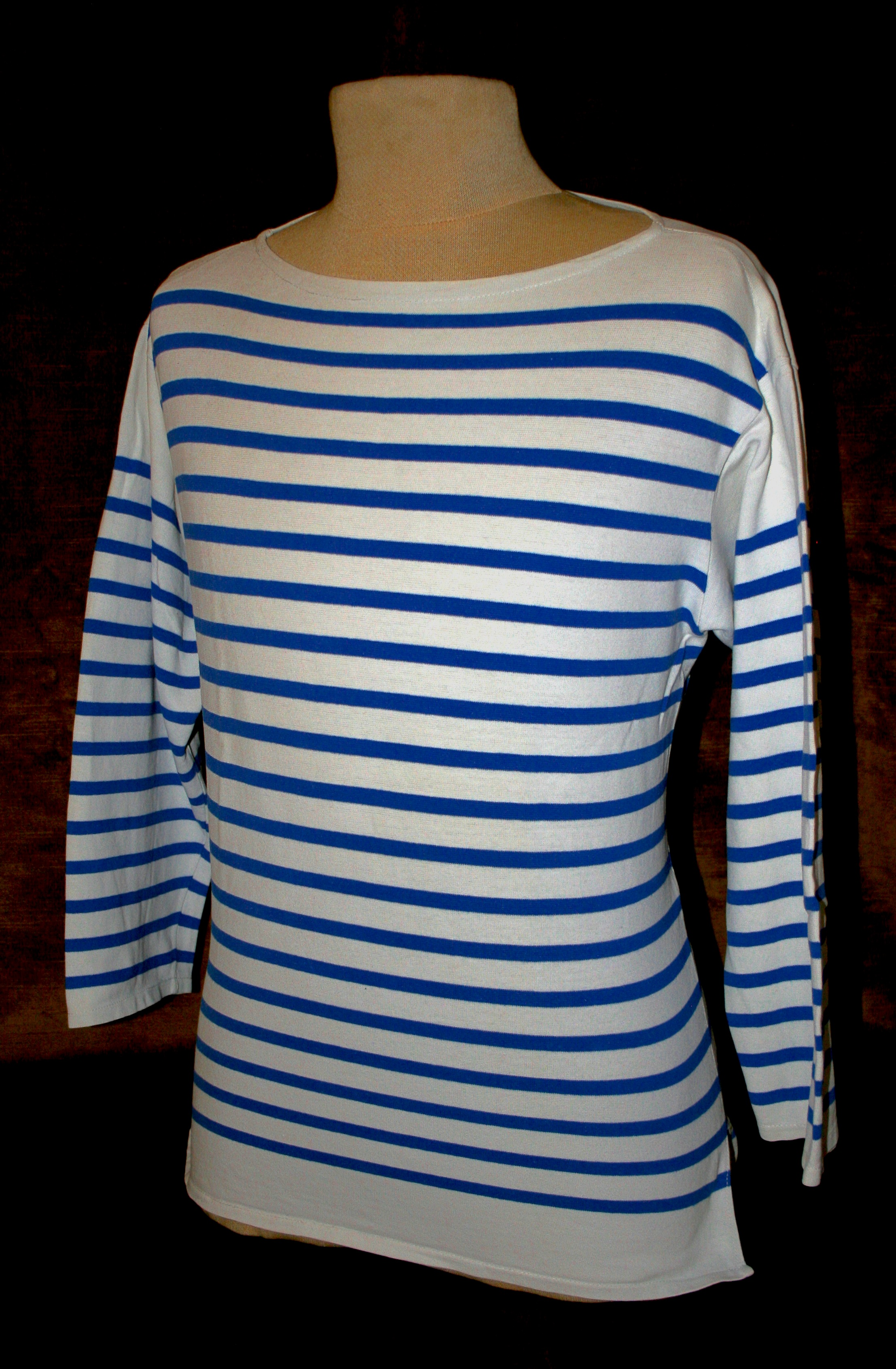
Marinière of the French Navy

A marinière (French: [maʁinjɛʁ]), or tricot rayé (French: [tʁiko ʁɛje]; lit. 'striped sweater'), is a cotton long-sleeved shirt with horizontal blue and white stripes. Characteristically worn by quartermasters and seamen in the French Navy, it has become a staple in civilian French fashion and, especially outside France, this kind of striped garment is often part of the stereotypical image of a French person. It is also known as a Breton shirt, as many sailors in the French Navy were from Brittany.

== History ==
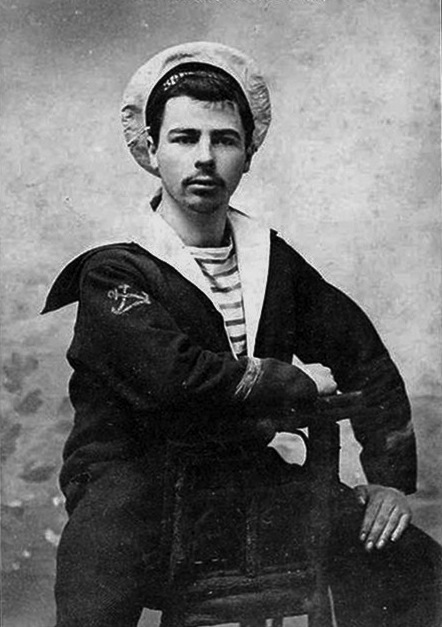
French sailor in uniform, early 20th century

Regulations of 27 March 1858 introduced the blue-and-white marinière to the French Navy's official uniform for seamen, describing it thus:

Le corps de la chemise devra compter 21 rayures blanches, chacune deux fois plus large que les 20 à 21 rayures bleu indigo.
The body shall have 21 white stripes, each twice as wide as the 20 or 21 navy blue stripes.

A genuine marinière has, front and back, twenty navy blue stripes each 10 millimetres (0.4 in) wide, spaced 20 millimetres (0.8 in) apart, and on the sleeves fourteen navy blue stripes spaced the same. (Note: There can be twenty-one on the body and fifteen on the sleeves for very tall sailors. Legend has it that each of the twenty-one represents one of Napoleon's victories.) The three-quarter-length sleeves must be no longer than those of the overjacket, and the flared collar must reach the neck.

The "Tricot bleu de service courant Marine nationale" ("French Navy Standard Duty Blue Jersey") is part of Uniforms 22bis and 23.

Sailors used to say that the stripes made it easier to see men who had fallen into the sea.

Marinières were made by independent tailors, but eventually were made in navy workshops; army tailoring was a separate duty, often performed by conscripts. Marinières became a large product in France, manufactured by companies such as Saint James, Armor Lux and Orcival.

== Fashion ==
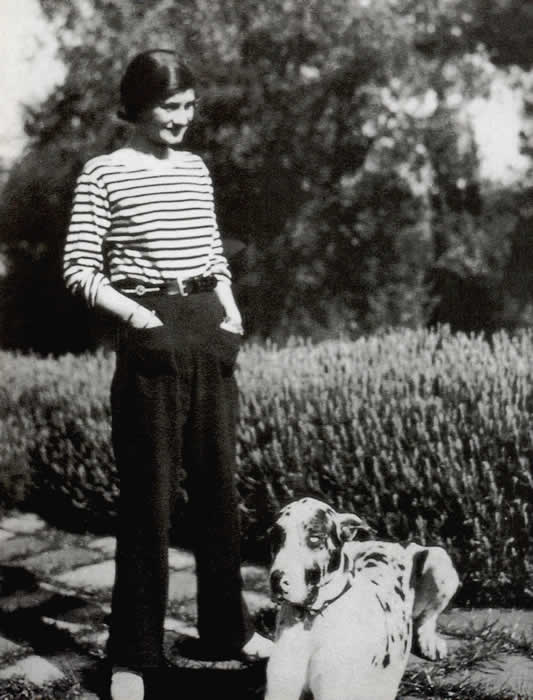
Coco Chanel, in the interwar period

Although it originated in the French navy, the marinière came to be seen as fashionable attire and is a staple of nautical style. During the First World War, Coco Chanel regularly took seaside holidays and was inspired by the local sailors' uniforms. At her second shop in Deauville she launched the "Navy Style", a short marinière. In doing so she continued the emancipation of women's bodies and the "practical" side of her creations, by using simple jersey fabric during times of privation. Her marinières became widespread luxury items. Years later, Karl Lagerfield paid homage to House of Chanel by regularly recreating the marinière for his fashion shows, especially in his ready-to-wear summer collection "Croisière".

In the 1940s the marinière was worn by John Wayne, then Jean Cocteau, Pablo Picasso, Brigitte Bardot, Marcel Marceau. Much later, Sting modelled for photographs wearing one.

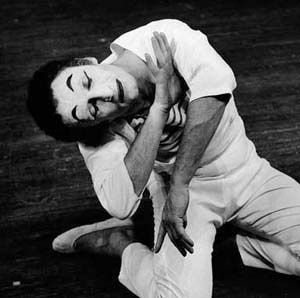
Mime artist Marcel Marceau, 1963, by Erling Mandelmann

In the 1960s, after Jean Seberg's appearance in a marinière in the film Breathless, Yves Saint Laurent introduced it into his premier collections, causing a fashion revolution in haute couture.

Jean Paul Gaultier has been in love with the marinière since the 1980s, in all its forms, styles and the most diverse materials. In 1983, it was the major element of his Boy Toy collection, Gaultier greeting the audience at the end of the show in a "classic classic", a marinière. (Note: Two years later, in 1985, Charlotte Gainsbourg wore one in L'Effrontée.)

In 2006, the marinière was rediscovered as an item of eveningwear.

Yvette Horner dressed in a marinière to model it for Pierre and Gilles, who used it as the design of flacons for Gaultier's fragrance line "Le Mâle". For him and his "children" and his partners the marinière has become an integral part of the world of fashion.

In the 2000s, Kenzo Takada started selling marinières, with polka dots, Sonia Rykiel having previously used differently coloured stripes, most often black, before returning to white on blue.

In 2010, the marinière set the trend: the Elite modelling agency in its annual competition, it dressed the finalists in them; Prada added them in its September collection, Gilas Loaëc's Breton brand Kitsuné, took it up, as did Dolce & Gabbana, Michael Kors and others.

The following year, the France national football team commissioned its supplier Nike for new away kit as a white jersey with blue stripes, taking inspiration from the marinière. It was seldom used. Much commented upon – and criticised – this striped kit was dropped eleven months afterwards in favour of a much plainer all-white strip.

In April 2011, the boutique Colette had the marinière as its theme, represented by many ready-to-wear brands: Chanel, Comme des Garçons, Hermès, Ladurée, Longchamp and its Montblanc range of baggage, YSL, Swatch, and others. Jean Paul Gaultier had an offering as always, but so did Salvatore Ferragamo, Oscar de la Renta, and The Row. Alexis Mabille incorporated it into collections. A year later, Thom Browne used the blue-and-white motif on trousers, for Moncler, followed by A.P.C. and Marc by Marc Jacobs.

In addition to traditional French companies Armor Lux, Saint James only since 1982 (which at that time completed its historic wool manufacture with cotton) and the venerable Orcival, who has been manufacturing marinières in France since it supplied the French Navy, the brand Petit Bateau have taken up the marinière after a long absence, using it in a range of styles.

In 2017, the Museum of Modern Art (MOMA) has chosen the Orcival Breton top to epitomize the genuine Breton top for its exhibition "Is Fashion Modern?"

== Political symbol ==
On 19 October 2012, Arnaud Montebourg, the French Industry Minister, wore an Armor Lux marinière in a cover photo for Le Parisien's magazine. Montebourg had agreed to the magazine's request to wear the marinière, with a French-made watch, in front of French-made household appliances. The cover article was a ten-page dossier on "Made in France", Montebourg's domestic production drive.

== See also ==
- Sailor cap
- Sailor suit
- Telnyashka – An undershirt used with military uniforms in Russia inspired by the marinière
