= Navy blue =

Dark shade of blue

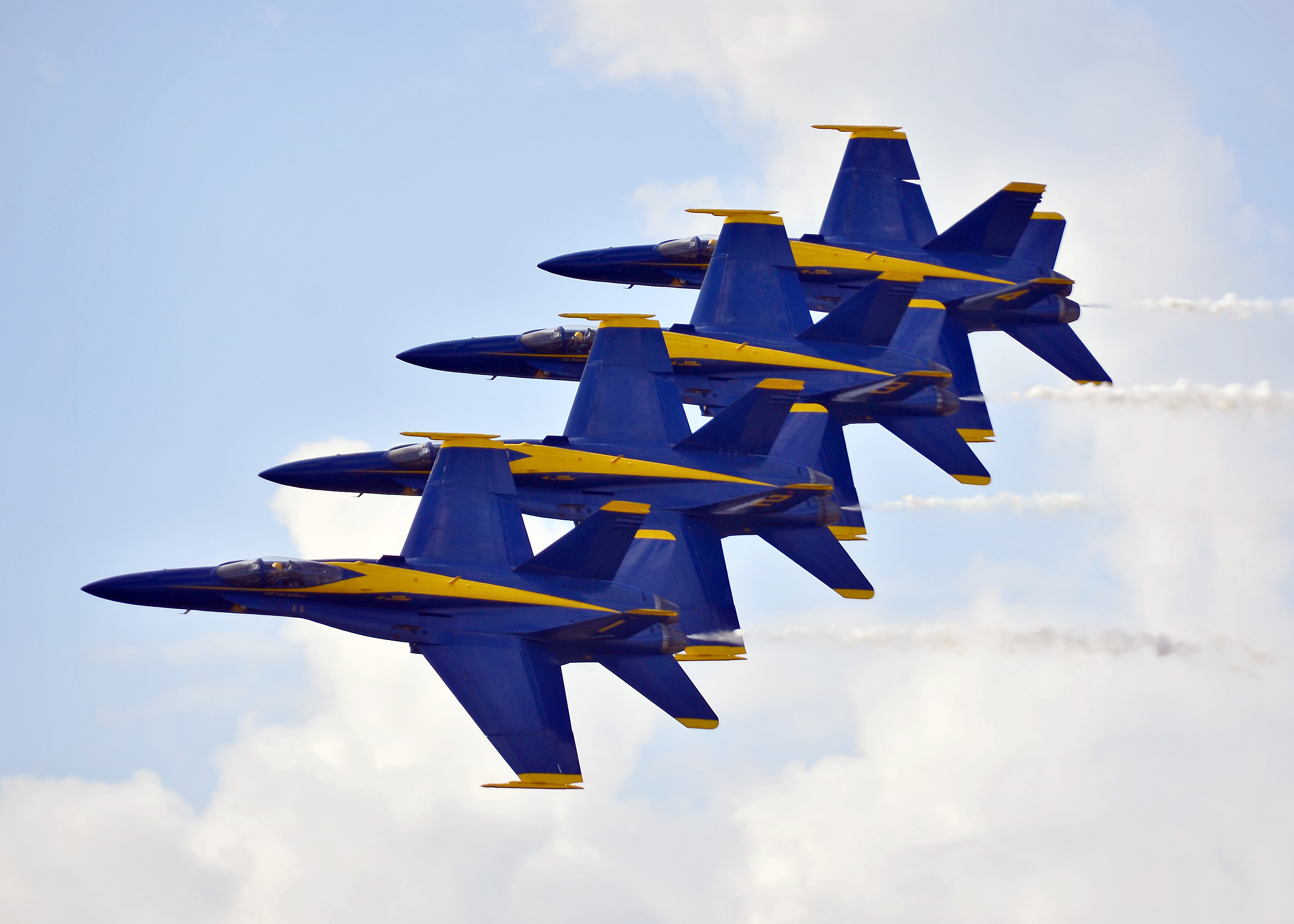
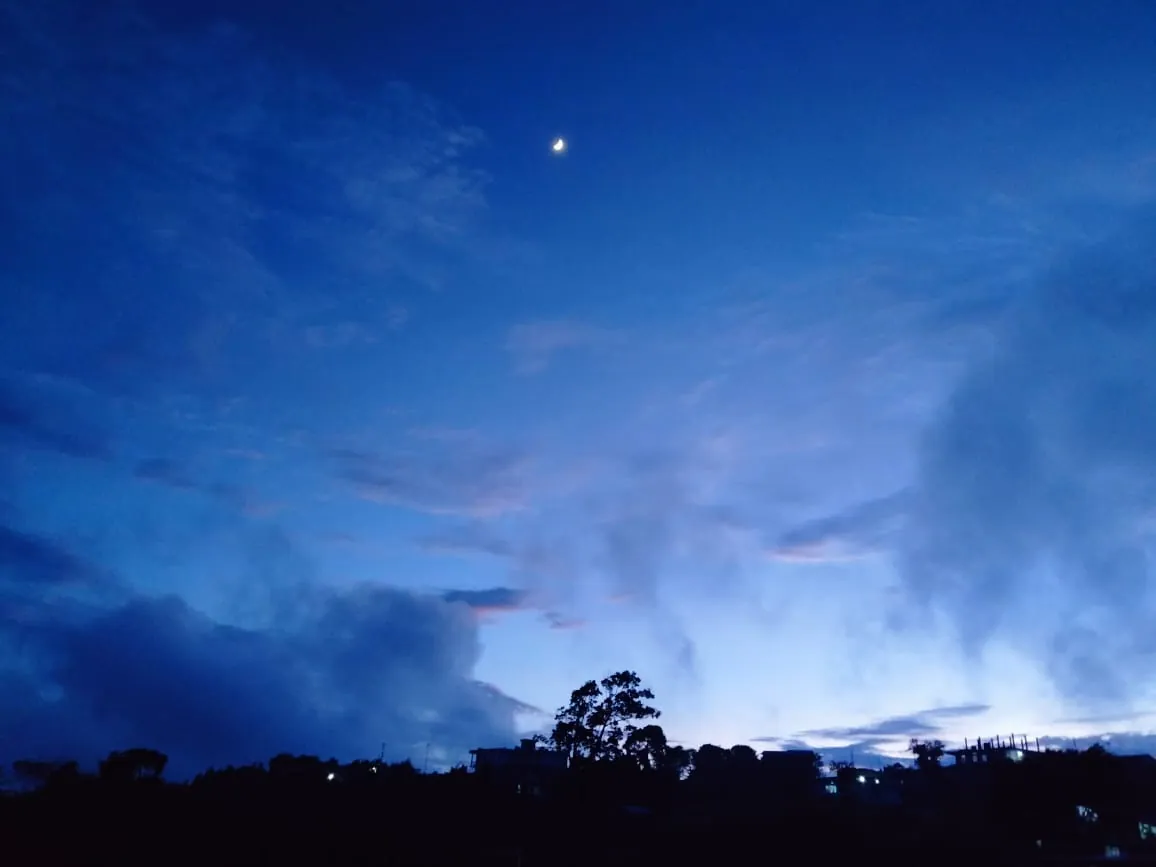
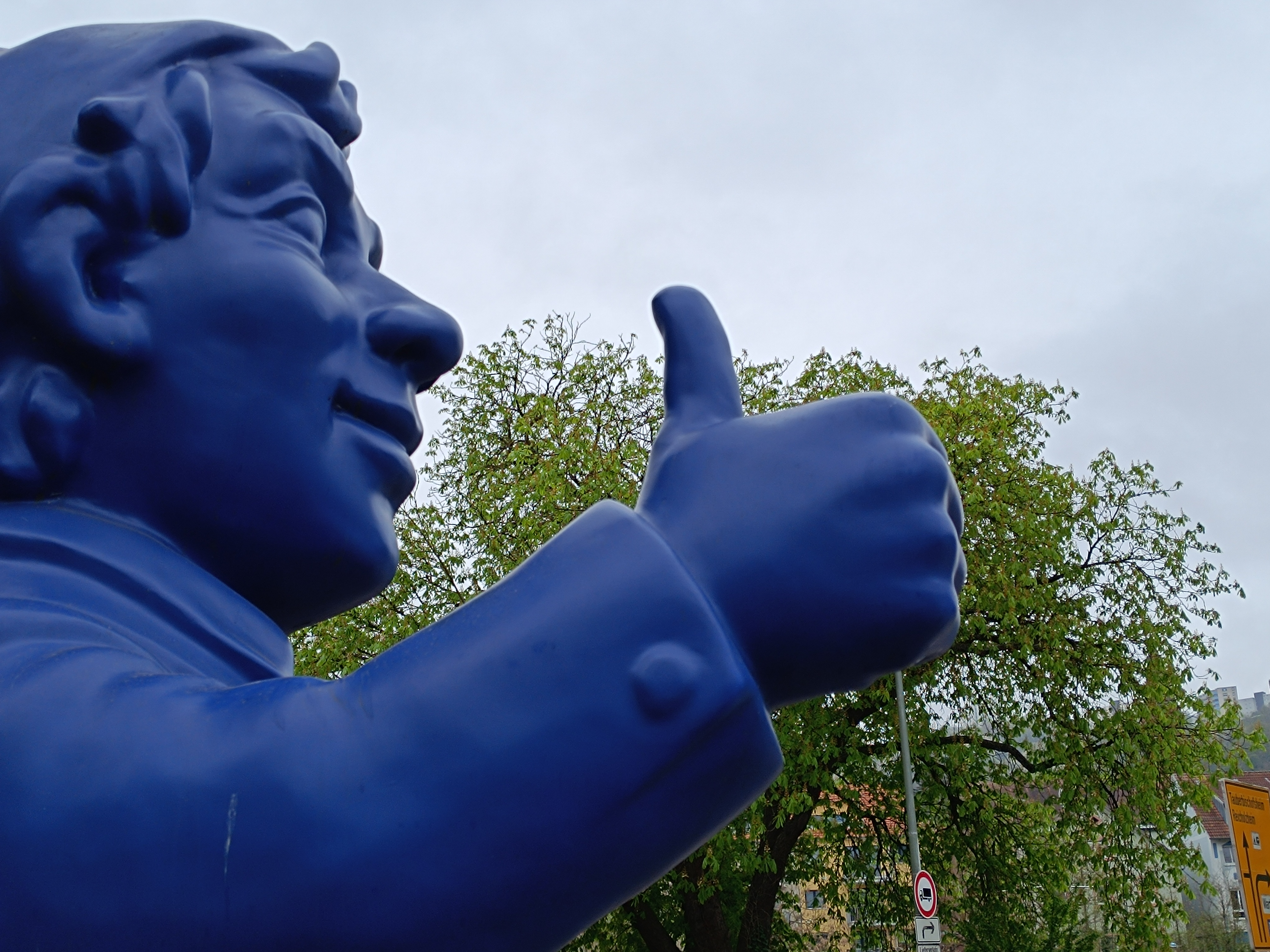
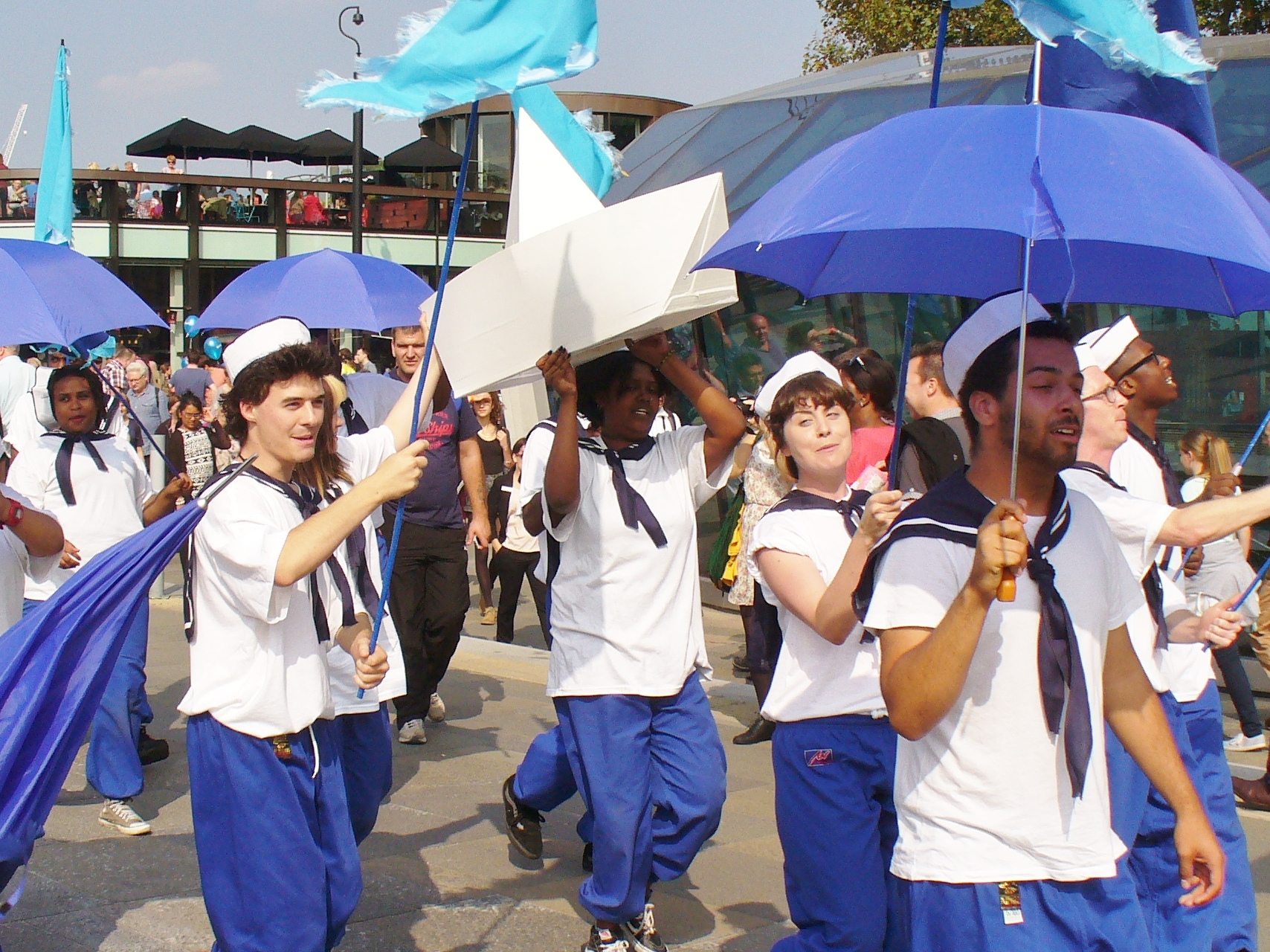
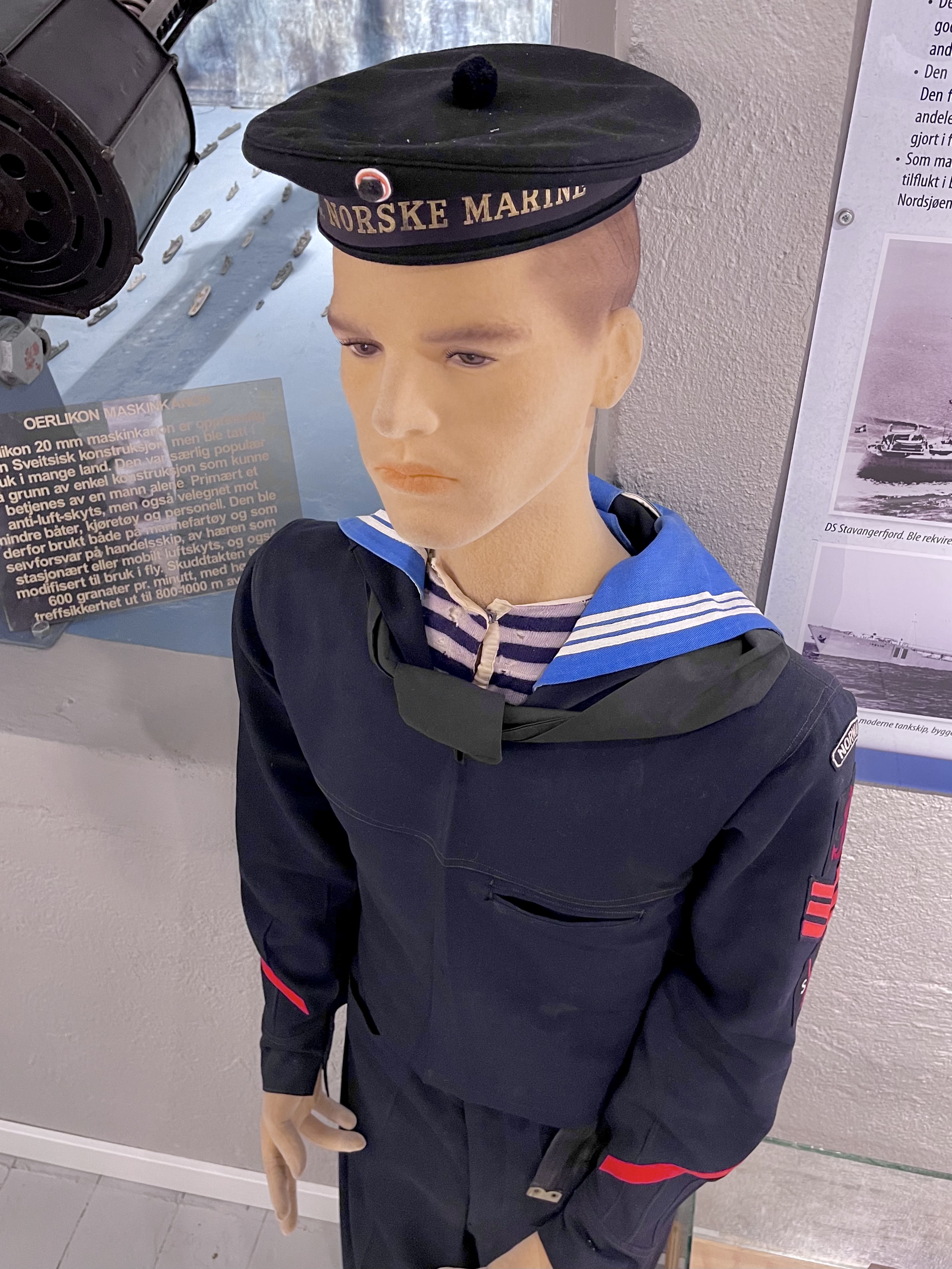
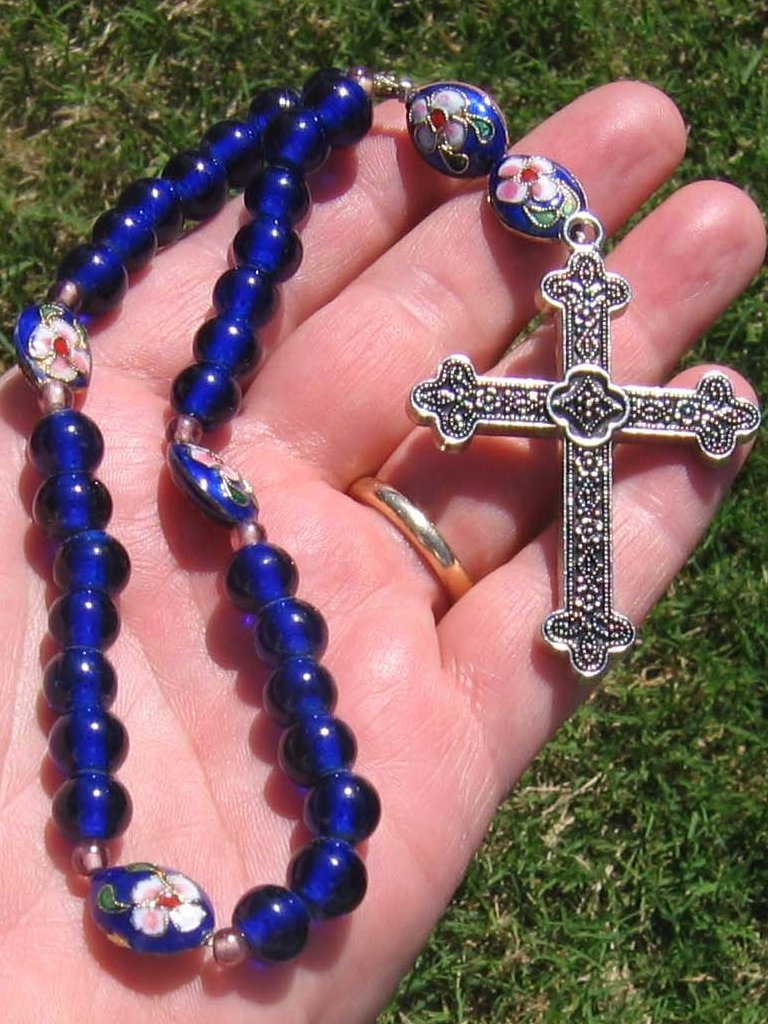
- Clockwise, from top left: The Blue Angels flying in formation; Night sky; March of people during the Tall Ships Race of 2014; Anglican prayer beads; Uniform of a naval gunner in the Royal Norwegian Navy, on display in the Royal Norwegian Navy Museum; Wertheimer Optimist sculpture by Ottmar Hörl.

Color coordinates
- Hex triplet: #000080
- sRGB^{B} (r, g, b): (0, 0, 128)
- HSV (h, s, v): (240°, 100%, 50%)
- CIELCh_{uv} (L, C, h): (13, 52, 266°)
- Source: HTML/CSS
- ISCC–NBS descriptor: Vivid blue
- B: Normalized to [0–255] (byte); H: Normalized to [0–100] (hundred)

Navy blue, also known simply as navy, is a dark shade of the color blue. The name navy blue originally referred to the color of uniforms worn by officers in the Royal Navy. In the late 18th century, the Royal Navy adopted the color for its sailors' uniforms, partly due to the practical reason that dark colors were less prone to showing dirt and wear during long sea voyages. The color became so associated with naval service that it came to be known simply as "navy blue."

== History ==
Navy blue got its name from the dark blue (contrasted with naval white) worn by officers in the British Royal Navy. The first uniform regulations for officers were issued in 1748, with the predominant colors being dark blue and white. It was initially called marine blue, but by at least 1780, it was being referred to in the British press as navy blue.

The distinctive dark shade of blue was subsequently adopted by other navies and military forces around the world, becoming a symbol of military authority and discipline.

The color gained further popularity as a neutral and versatile hue. Navy blue was often used for business suits, school uniforms, and other formal wear. It was especially prominent in men's fashion in the mid-20th century.

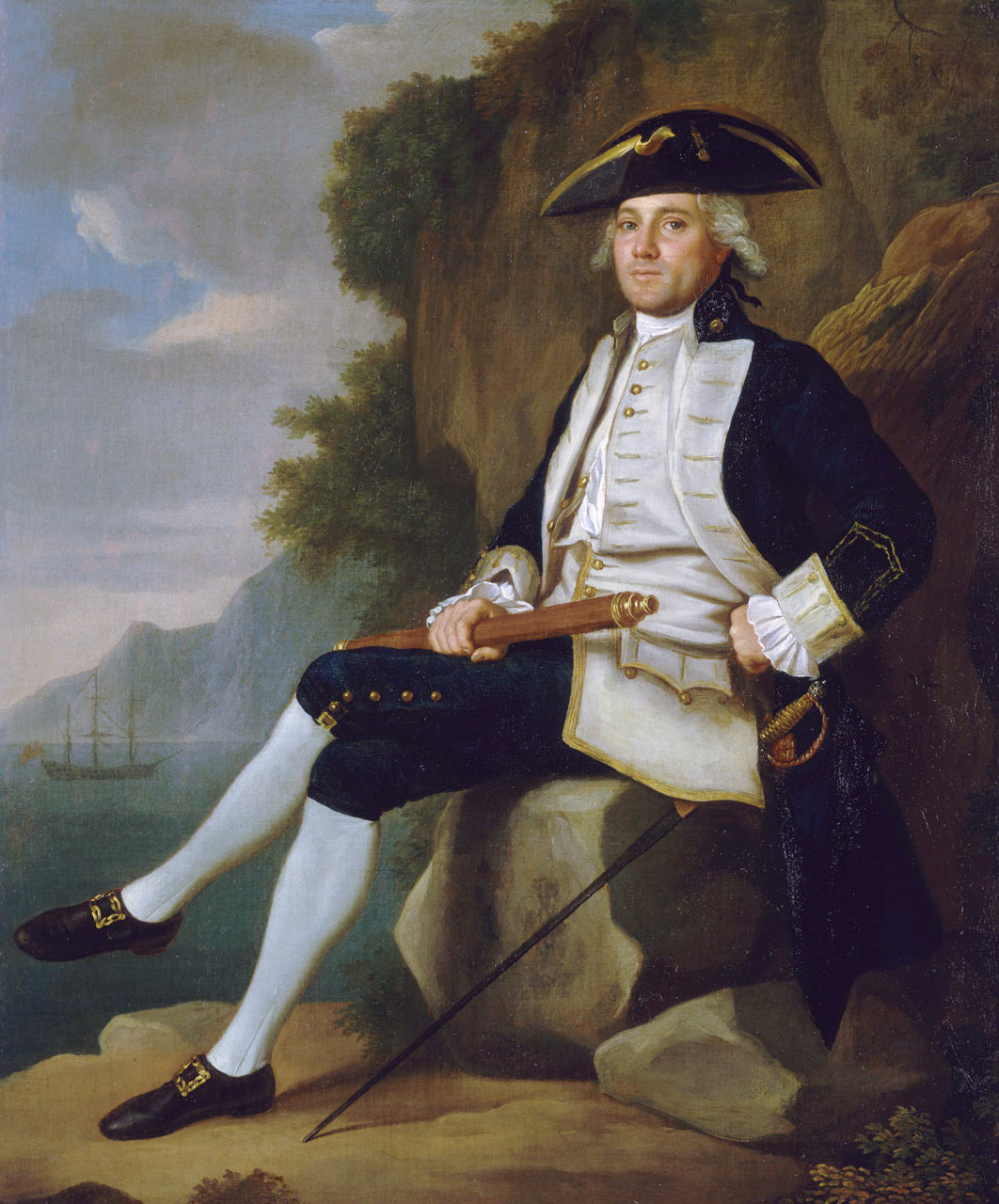
Captain Edward Vernon in the navy blue and white uniform of the Royal Navy (c1750)

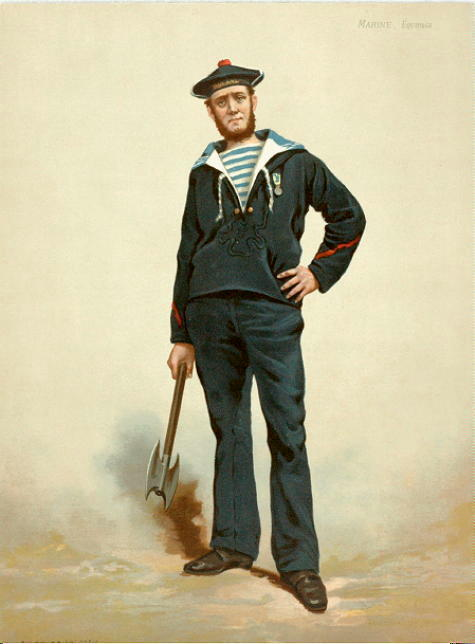
French sailor in dark blue uniform (c1843)

== Variations ==
=== Indigo dye ===
Indigo dye

Color coordinates
- Hex triplet: #091F92
- sRGB^{B} (r, g, b): (9, 31, 146)
- HSV (h, s, v): (230°, 94%, 57%)
- CIELCh_{uv} (L, C, h): (20, 70, 264°)
- Source: Gallego and Sanz
- ISCC–NBS descriptor: Vivid blue
- B: Normalized to [0–255] (byte)

Indigo dye is the color which is called Añil (the Spanish word for "indigo dye") in the Guía de coloraciones (Guide to colorations) by Rosa Gallego and Juan Carlos Sanz, a color dictionary published in 2005 that is widely popular in the Hispanophone realm.

Indigo dye is the basis for all the historical navy blue colors, since in the 18th, 19th, and early 20th century, almost every navy uniform was made by dyeing them with various shades of indigo dye.

=== Navy blue (Crayola) ===
Navy blue (Crayola)

Color coordinates
- Hex triplet: #0066CC
- sRGB^{B} (r, g, b): (0, 102, 204)
- HSV (h, s, v): (210°, 100%, 80%)
- CIELCh_{uv} (L, C, h): (44, 93, 255°)
- Source: Crayola
- ISCC–NBS descriptor: Vivid blue
- B: Normalized to [0–255] (byte)

The Crayola color named "navy blue" is not as dark a shade as the blues actually used by navies.

This tone of navy blue was formulated as a Crayola color in 1958.

=== U.S. Navy blue ===
U.S. Navy blue

Color coordinates
- Hex triplet: #022A3A
- sRGB^{B} (r, g, b): (2, 42, 58)
- HSV (h, s, v): (197°, 97%, 23%)
- CIELCh_{uv} (L, C, h): (15, 17, 232°)
- Source: United States Navy
- ISCC–NBS descriptor: Dark azure blue
- B: Normalized to [0–255] (byte)

The United States Navy uses #022A3A as an official color. Navy blue is the predominant color of U.S. Navy uniforms. The flag of the U.S. Navy uses navy blue.

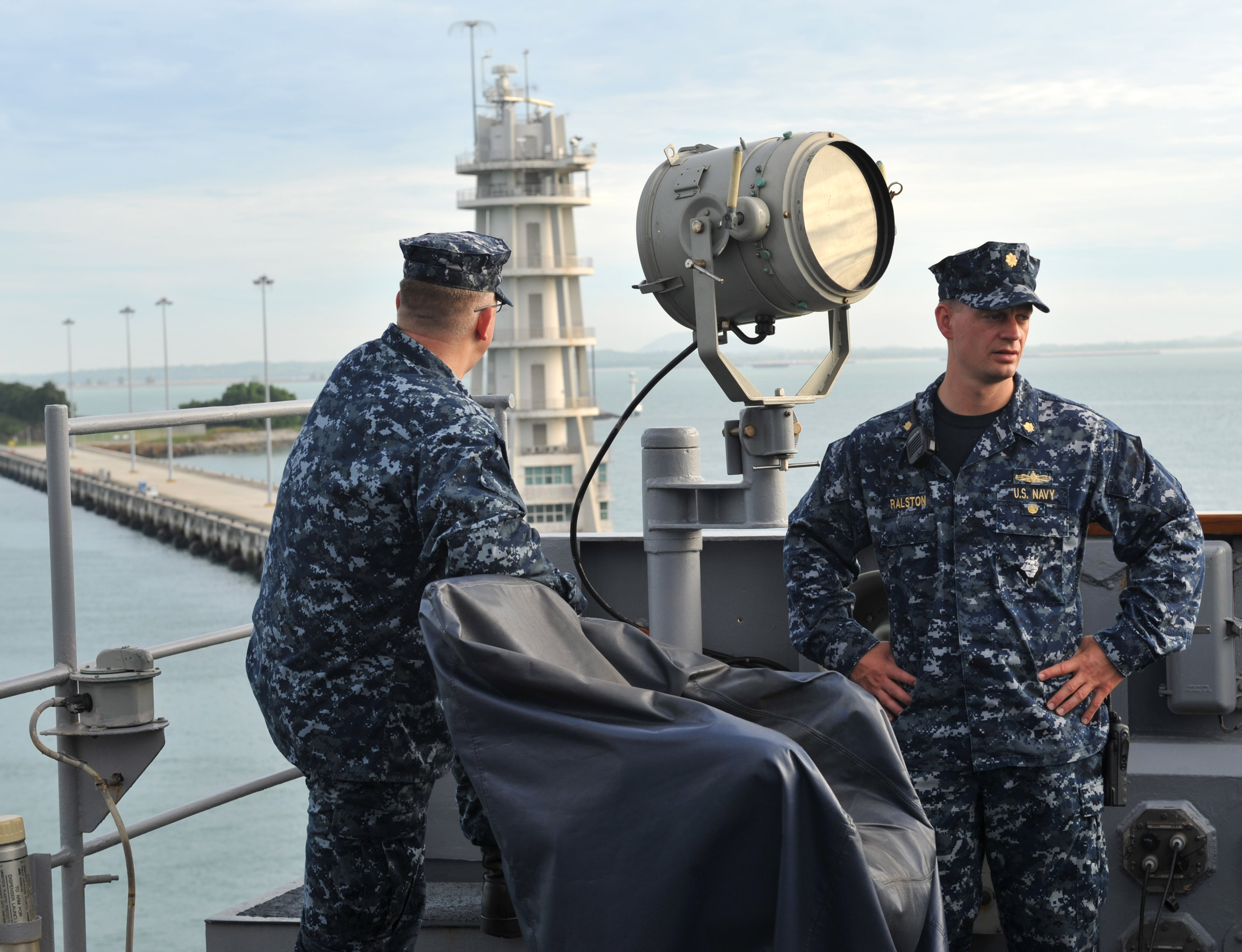
US Navy sailors in navy blue camouflage

Flag of the US Navy

=== Peacoat ===
Peacoat

Color coordinates
- Hex triplet: #2B2E43
- sRGB^{B} (r, g, b): (43, 46, 67)
- HSV (h, s, v): (232°, 36%, 26%)
- CIELCh_{uv} (L, C, h): (20, 15, 262°)
- Source: Pantone TCX
- ISCC–NBS descriptor: Dark purplish blue
- B: Normalized to [0–255] (byte)

The source of this color is the Pantone textile cotton extended color list, color #19-3920 TCX—peacoat.

=== Persian indigo ===
Persian Indigo

Color coordinates
- Hex triplet: #32127A
- sRGB^{B} (r, g, b): (50, 18, 122)
- HSV (h, s, v): (258°, 85%, 48%)
- CIELCh_{uv} (L, C, h): (18, 56, 272°)
- Source: 99colors.net/Maerz and Paul
- ISCC–NBS descriptor: Vivid purplish blue
- B: Normalized to [0–255] (byte)

The color Persian indigo is displayed on the right. Another name for this color is regimental because in the 19th century, it was commonly used by many nations for navy uniforms, though it is rarely used in modern times.

Persian indigo is named for an association with a product from Persia: Persian cloth dyed with indigo.

The first recorded use of regimental (the original name for the color now called Persian indigo) as a color name in English was in 1912.

=== Space cadet ===
Space cadet

Color coordinates
- Hex triplet: #1E2952
- sRGB^{B} (r, g, b): (30, 41, 82)
- HSV (h, s, v): (227°, 63%, 32%)
- CIELCh_{uv} (L, C, h): (18, 29, 260°)
- Source: Resene
- ISCC–NBS descriptor: Dark blue
- B: Normalized to [0–255] (byte)

Space cadet is one of the colors on the Resene Color List, a color list widely popular in Australia and New Zealand. The color was formulated in 2007.

This color is apparently a formulation of an impression of the color that cadets in space navy training would wear.

== In culture ==
=== Computers ===
Navy Blue (HTML)

Color coordinates
- Hex triplet: #000080
- sRGB^{B} (r, g, b): (0, 0, 128)
- HSV (h, s, v): (240°, 100%, 50%)
- CIELCh_{uv} (L, C, h): (13, 52, 266°)
- Source: w3schools.com
- B: Normalized to [0–255] (byte)

- The color navy was one of the original 16 HTML/CSS colors initially formulated for standardized computer display in the late 1980s.

=== Military ===
- In many world navies, including the United States Navy and the Royal Canadian Navy, uniforms which are called "navy blue" are, in actuality, colored black, as the uniforms became progressively darker over time to counter fading of the dye, although modern dyes are fade resistant. The Canadian Forces dress instructions specify that "'navy blue' is a tone of black". (See also uniforms of the United States Navy and uniforms of the Royal Canadian Navy.)

=== Music ===
- Navy Blue is an album by Diane Renay (all the songs are about sailors).

=== Fashion ===
- Navy blue and white, often accented with gold buttons or rope motifs, are signature elements of nautical style. The colors evoke a sense of naval tradition and oceanic life. They are often seen in the form of Breton stripes; horizontal stripes found in the traditional marinière of the French navy. The colors have become synonymous with seaside chic.

Navy blue is also considered to be a classic color in other styles of dress, especially in business casual. It associates with naval power, authority, and formal events, though it's also a common choice for a range of contemporary uses, from interior design to school uniforms.

=== Sports ===
- Navy blue is used by numerous professional and collegiate sports teams:

Association football

- French national team
- Japanese national team
- Scottish national team
- United States men's and women's national teams
- Birmingham City F.C.
- Blackburn Rovers F.C.
- Brighton & Hove Albion F.C.
- Falkirk F.C.
- Cardiff City F.C.
- Chelsea F.C.
- Chicago Fire FC
- Everton F.C.
- FC Girondins de Bordeaux
- Fenerbahçe S.K.
- Genoa C.F.C.
- LA Galaxy
- Leicester City F.C.
- Melbourne Victory
- Millwall F.C.
- New England Revolution
- New York City FC
- Paris Saint-Germain F.C.
- Philadelphia Union
- Queens Park Rangers F.C.
- Reading F.C.
- Società Ginnastica Andrea Doria
- Sporting Kansas City
- Tottenham Hotspur F.C.
- Vancouver Whitecaps FC
- Viking Stavanger
- West Bromwich Albion F.C.
- Wigan Athletic F.C.
- York City F.C.

Australian Football League

- Adelaide Crows
- Carlton Blues
- Geelong Cats
- Melbourne Demons

Major League Baseball

- Atlanta Braves
- Boston Red Sox
- Cleveland Guardians
- Detroit Tigers
- Houston Astros
- Milwaukee Brewers
- Minnesota Twins
- New York Yankees
- St. Louis Cardinals
- Seattle Mariners
- Tampa Bay Rays
- Toronto Blue Jays
- Washington Nationals

National Basketball Association

- Dallas Mavericks
- Denver Nuggets
- Indiana Pacers
- Memphis Grizzlies
- New Orleans Pelicans
- Oklahoma City Thunder
- Washington Wizards

National Football League

- Chicago Bears
- Dallas Cowboys
- Denver Broncos
- Houston Texans
- New England Patriots
- Los Angeles Chargers
- Seattle Seahawks
- Tennessee Titans

National Hockey League

- Colorado Avalanche
- Columbus Blue Jackets
- Florida Panthers
- Nashville Predators
- New York Rangers
- St. Louis Blues
- Seattle Kraken
- Washington Capitals
- Winnipeg Jets

National Rugby League

- Melbourne Storm
- North Queensland Cowboys
- Sydney Roosters

American collegiate teams

- University of Arizona
- University of California, Berkeley
- University of Pittsburgh
- Auburn University
- Adamson University
- Florida Atlantic University
- Florida International University
- Georgetown University
- Georgia Institute of Technology
- Gonzaga University
- University of Illinois
- University of Notre Dame
- University of Maine
- University of Michigan
- University of Mississippi
- University of Nevada, Reno
- University of San Diego
- University of Virginia
- Palm Beach Atlantic University
- Pennsylvania State University
- University of Rhode Island
- Saint Mary's College of California
- Shippensburg University of Pennsylvania
- Syracuse University
- West Virginia University
- United States Naval Academy
- Xavier University
- Colegio de San Juan de Letran
- Catawba College
- University of Connecticut

== See also ==
- Air Force blue
- Army green
- Azure (color)
- List of colors
- Midnight blue
- Royal blue
- Sky blue
