= Nautical style =

Maritime-inspired fashion style

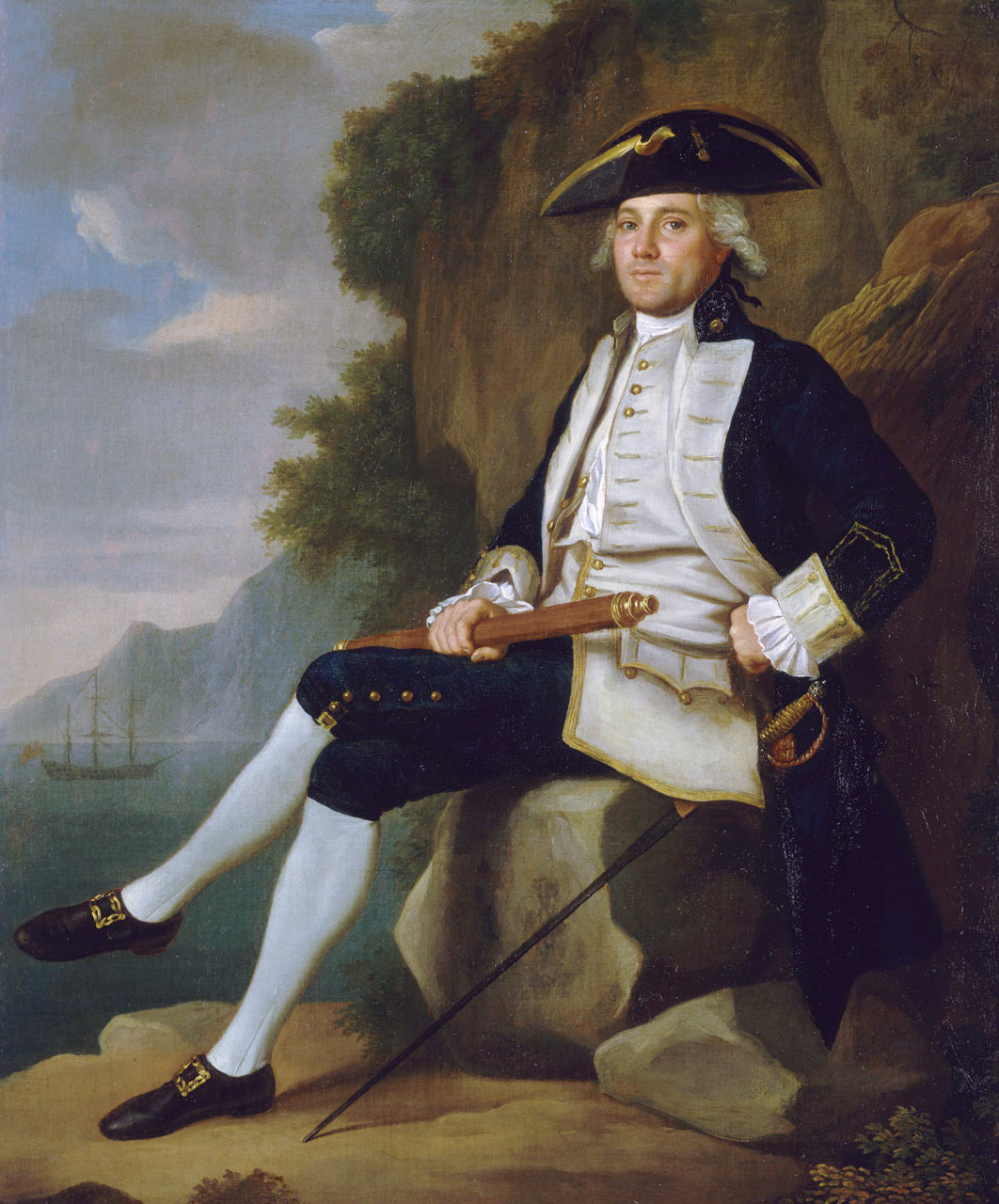
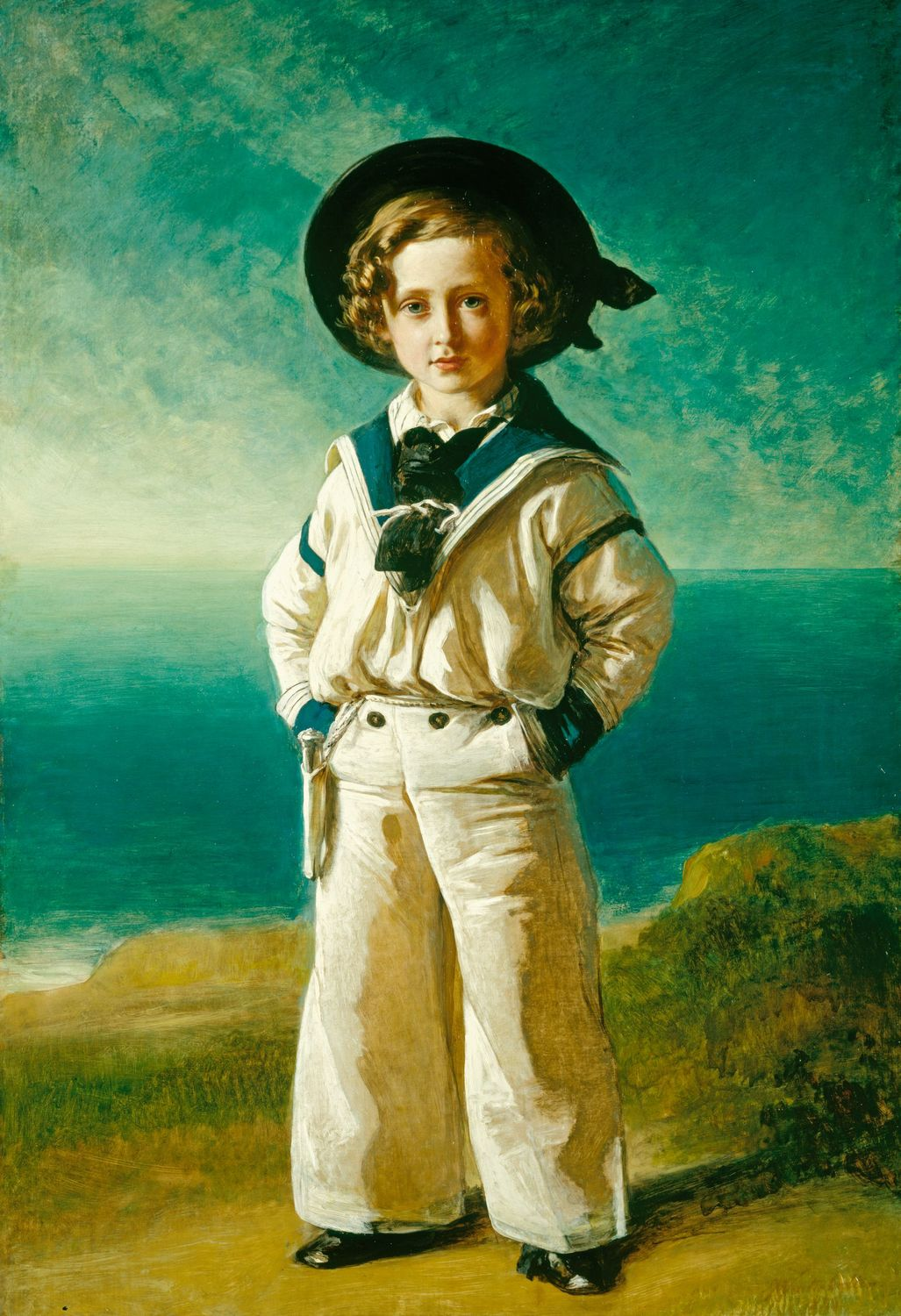
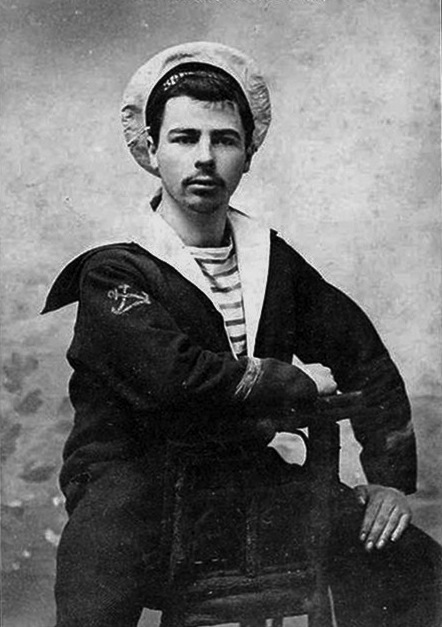
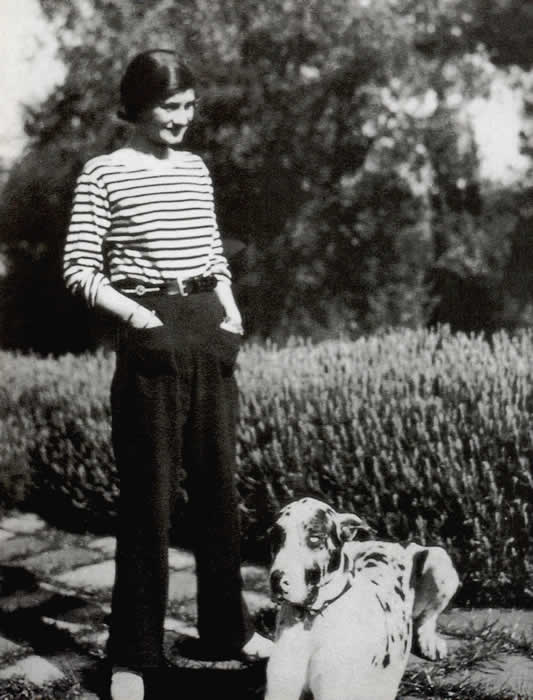
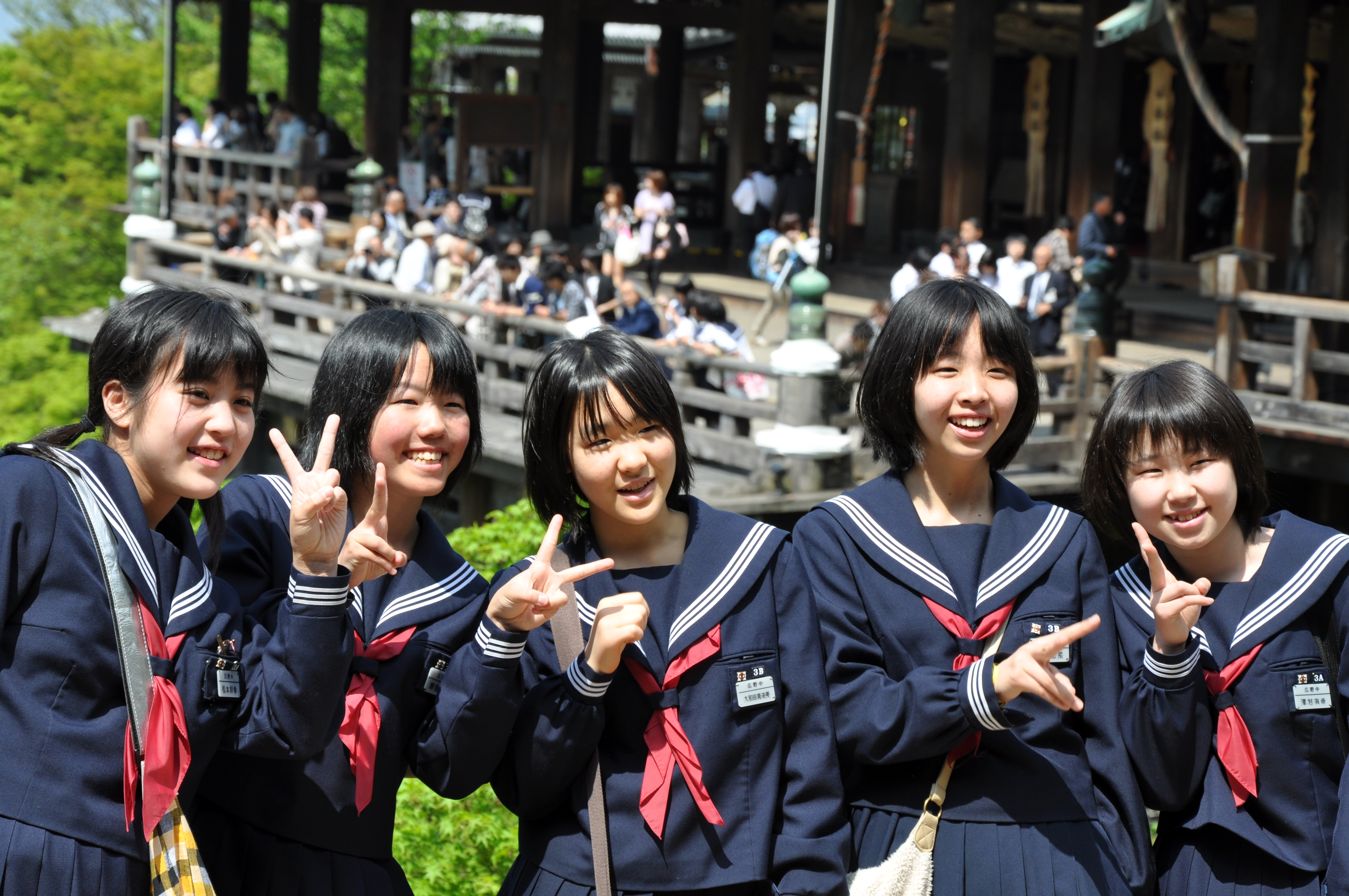
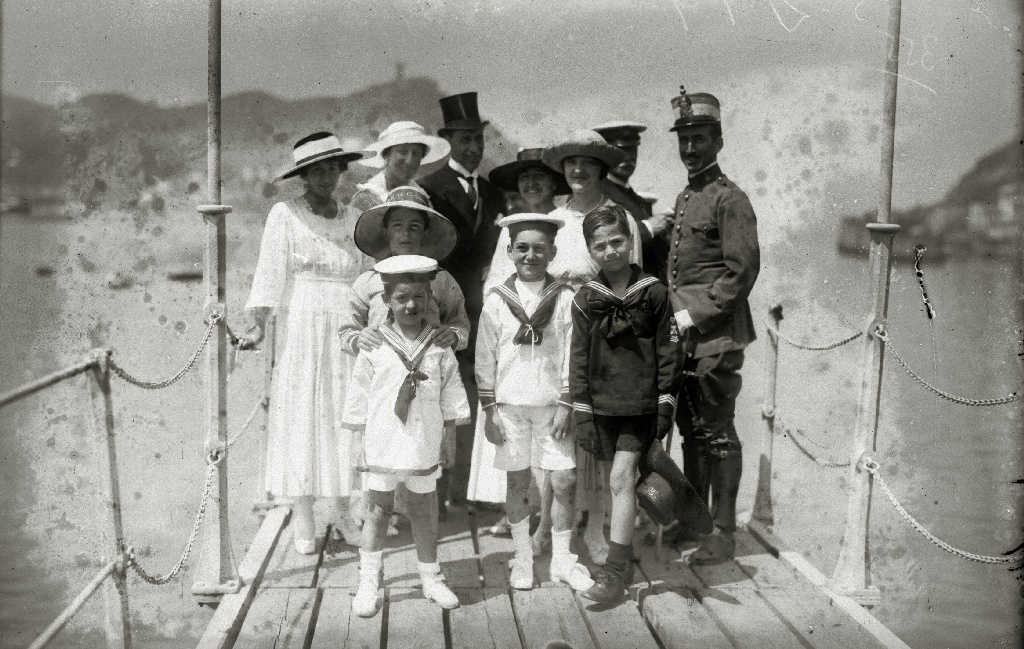
Top down: Captain Edward Vernon in British naval uniform (c1750), Prince Albert wearing a sailor's uniform (1846), French sailor in uniform (early-1900), Coco Chanel wearing her iconic version of the marinière (1928), Japanese schoolgirls - nautical style is popular for school uniforms in Japan (2009), unknown family group in San Sebastián, showing nautical style for children was now popular by this time (1917)

Nautical style, also known as maritime fashion, is an iconic and enduring style of dress that has its roots in the traditional naval uniforms of Britain and France. Over the years it has transitioned into civilian maritime attire, leisurewear, and a globally recognisable fashion genre. Its ongoing appeal lies in its simplicity, durability, and clearly defined visual identity.

It has featured in the work of top fashion designers, most notably Coco Chanel, who included a female version of the marinière in her 1917 collection, and Jean Paul Gaultier, who relaunched it for men, as part of his Boy Toy collection, in 1983.

== History ==
The first uniform regulations for officers in the British Royal Navy were issued in 1748, with the predominant colours being dark blue, and white. The distinctive dark shade of blue was being referred to in the press as navy blue by at least 1780. It was subsequently adopted by other navies around the world, and is now a key component of nautical style.

The popularity of nautical style as a fashion can be traced to Queen Victoria, who inspired a trend for children's wear that soon became widespread. In 1846 she had a child’s sailor uniform made her son Prince Albert, and the Queen recorded the first time he wore it in her diary;

"Bertie put on his sailor's dress, which was beautifully made by the man on board who makes for our sailors. When he appeared, the officers and sailors who were all assembled on deck to see him, cheered, and seemed delighted"

The iconic French marinière, now more commonly referred to as a Breton shirt, is a cotton top featuring horizontal navy blue and white stripes, and a staple of nautical style. It was first introduced as the official uniform of the French Navy in 1858, and traditionally had 21 stripes (reportedly one for each of Napoleon’s victories). During the First World War, Coco Chanel regularly took seaside holidays and was inspired by the local sailors' uniforms. At her second shop in Deauville she launched the "Navy Style", a short marinière. It revolutionised women’s leisurewear with a distinctly nautical flair, and her marinières soon became sought-after luxury items.

Breton shirts, as civilian menswear, were popularised by Pablo Picasso who painted a self-portrait of himself wearing one in 1943, but it wasn't until 1983, when Jean Paul Gaultier relaunched them as part of his "Boy Toy" collection, that they gained mainstream popularity.

Yves Saint-Laurent was the first to bring the naval collar and reefer jacket to the catwalk in 1962. This novel collection was inspired by his friends on Paris' Left Bank, including Jean Cocteau, who were already dressing in utility wear.

== Key elements of nautical style ==
The key elements of nautical style can be considered in terms of colours, patterns, fabrics and tailoring. Traditionally, the style is most strongly associated with a restrained palette of navy blue, white and red, derived from British and French naval uniforms. Horizontal stripes, particularly the navy-and-white Breton stripe, have also become a defining element. Natural and durable fabrics such as wool, cotton, canvas and linen feature prominently, due to their practicality in maritime environments, although lighter garments, such as blouses and silk scarves, incorporating nautical designs, are also common.

Tailoring within nautical style tends to be structured and influenced by naval and yacht club uniforms. Garments such as navy blazers, double-breasted jackets and pea coats reflect this military heritage, often incorporating brass buttons and other naval-inspired detailing. More casual clothing includes loose-fitting tops, shorts and deck shoes designed for leisure and practicality. Accessorising is an important and unifying feature of the style. Sailor caps, jewellery and handbags, etc, commonly feature maritime symbols such as anchors, ropes and ship wheels as a means to ground the overall look within seafaring culture.

== See also ==
- Fashion
- British fashion
- French fashion
