= Apache shirt =

Apache shirt may refer to:

- Wamus, a buckskin war shirt worn by warriors from the Apache tribe, among others
- Marinière, a blue and white striped sailor shirt worn by the Apache street gangs in Paris in the early 20th century
