= Samare =

Loose jacket with side laps reaching to the knee

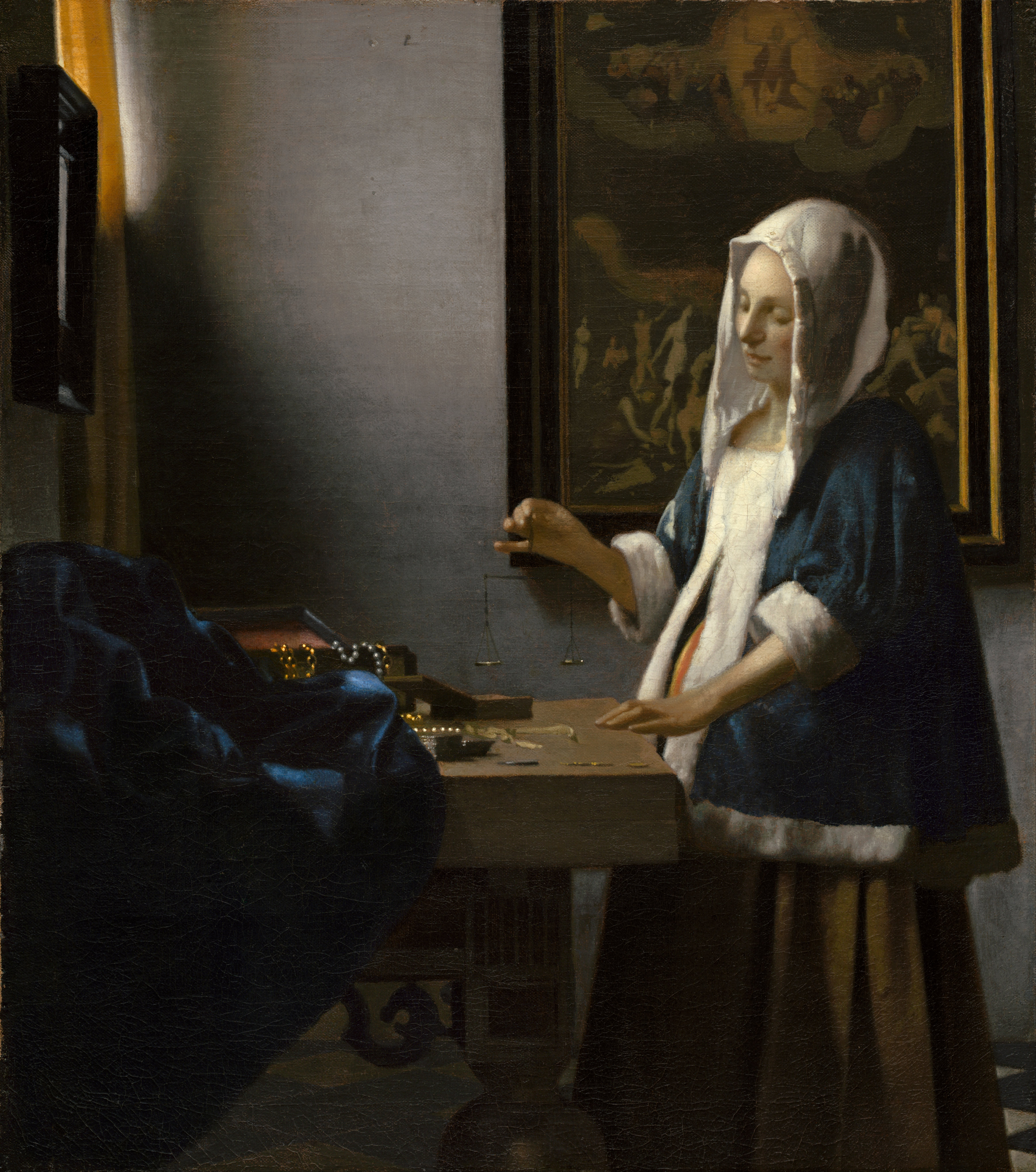
A possible example of the samare, as seen in Johannes Vermeer's Woman Holding a Balance, from the 17th century.

Samare was an outer garment of ladies in the 17th century. It was a loose jacket with extra frills hung down to the knees in the style of a gown. It was worn with a petticoat. Elisabeth McClellan describes the samare as a garment "worn by the Dutch ladies over a waistcoat and petticoat."

As per Randle Holme, it was a long-skirted jacket with four separate tails falling to knee-length.
