= Wamu (disambiguation) =

WAMU is a public radio station that services the greater Washington, DC metropolitan area.

Wamu may also refer to:

- West African Monetary Union, established 1962 and rebranded 1994 into West African Economic and Monetary Union
- Wamu center, the original name of the Russell Investments Center in Seattle
- Washington Mutual (WaMu), once the United States' largest savings and loan association

== See also ==
- Wamus, a traditional term for an American leather or cloth jacket.
