= Nick Fuentes =

American far-right political activist (born 1998)

- Fuentes in 2022
- Born: Nicholas Joseph Fuentes; August 18, 1998 (age 28); Illinois, U.S.
- Education: Boston University (attended); College of DuPage (AA)
- Occupations: Political activist; streamer
- Years active: 2015–present
- Organization: America First Foundation
- Known for: Political commentary; Leader of the Groypers
- Movement: White nationalism; White supremacy; Christian nationalism
- Website: nicholasjfuentes.com

Nicholas Joseph Fuentes (born August 18, 1998) is an American far-right political commentator, live streamer, and influencer. He hosts the livestreamed show America First, where he has advanced white nationalism and white supremacy, Christian nationalism, the incel subculture, misogyny, anti-LGBTQ views, and antisemitism including Holocaust denial and opposition to Israel. His supporters are known as "Groypers".

Fuentes was raised in La Grange Park, Illinois, and held mainstream conservative views while in high school. He became active in politics after graduating in 2016, voiced support for Donald Trump, and launched America First in 2017. He attended the 2017 Unite the Right rally. In 2019, his followers confronted speakers at Turning Point USA events in what became known as the "Groyper War". In 2020, he founded the America First Political Action Conference (AFPAC), described as a white nationalist alternative to CPAC, which has since been discontinued. Fuentes identifies as a Catholic, and his views have come under routine criticism by Catholic publications.

Fuentes later appeared at events preceding the January 6 United States Capitol attack. He drew further attention in 2022 after attending a private dinner at Mar-a-Lago with Donald Trump and Kanye West. In 2024, he initiated a second "Groyper War" targeting Trump's 2024 presidential campaign. Between 2020 and 2023, Fuentes was removed from numerous social media, streaming, and financial platforms for violating hate-speech policies and for his involvement in events surrounding January 6.

== Early life and education ==
Nicholas Joseph Fuentes was born on August 18, 1998, in Illinois, to William and Lauren (née Chicco) Fuentes. He has a twin sister, Melissa. Fuentes has described his ancestry as Italian, Irish and Mexican, noting that his paternal grandfather was Mexican American. He was raised in the Roman Catholic faith.

Fuentes grew up in La Grange Park, Illinois, and attended Lyons Township High School, where he served as student council president. During high school, he "strengthened his interest in politics" through speech and Model UN, a political talk show on the school's radio station WLTL, and The Nicholas J. Fuentes Show on the school's television station LTTV. One former classmate described him as a "talented public speaker with seemingly mainstream conservative views". Journalist John Keilman later wrote in the Chicago Tribune that "after his graduation in 2016, he embraced the extreme right".

In 2016, Fuentes enrolled at Boston University to study international relations and politics. He left the university after attending the 2017 Unite the Right rally in Charlottesville, Virginia, after he received death threats, alleging that he had "received 15 death threats via email and social media in the past week". He said that he attended the rally to "protest immigration and multiculturalism", adding that he was "not a white nationalist or racist". He also stated that he did not support violence and was not armed. Fuentes posted on Facebook that "you can call us racists, white supremacists, Nazis & bigots. … But you will not replace us", adding that the event would unleash a "tidal wave of white identity". During this time, Bill Allan, a former mentor and supervisor of television services at Lyons Township High School, said that Fuentes "may seek to outrage because he is trying to fuel a social media presence".

During a documentary with British journalist and filmmaker Louis Theroux, Fuentes recalled that at the start of his career, his parents urged "him to instead get a job or return to college". He said that he created a proposal to his parents: "'Why don't you give me just one year to explore this. If it works out, I'll keep doing it. If it doesn't work out, I'll abandon it'", adding, "And it worked out". Fuentes earned an associate degree from the College of DuPage in 2019.

== Media career ==
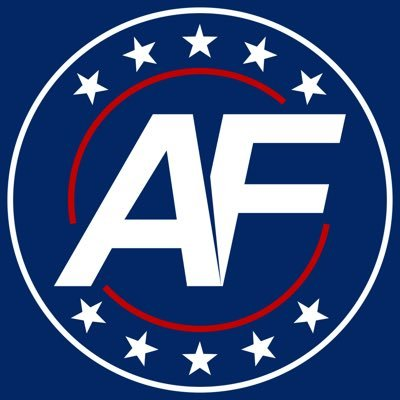
Logo of America First with Nicholas J. Fuentes

Fuentes launched his livestream America First with Nicholas J. Fuentes in 2017, noted for its utilization of irony and humor to appeal to younger audiences, while offering plausible deniability for more extreme statements. Fuentes stated that "irony is so important for giving a lot of cover and plausible deniability for our views", specifically citing Holocaust denial. Early broadcasts focused primarily on immigration and multiculturalism.

During this period, Fuentes made several inflammatory remarks. In an April 2017 episode, he said that "the First Amendment was not written for Muslims or immigrants", "globalists" controlled the media and it was "time to kill" them and suggested that CNN executives should be "arrested and deported or hanged". The comments led to his departure from Right Side Broadcasting Network in August 2017, with CEO Joe Seales saying that Fuentes "was just taking things a little too far into right field for us".

In another episode, Fuentes implied skepticism about the six-million Jewish death toll in the Holocaust after a viewer asked, "if I take one hour to cook a batch of cookies and Cookie Monster has 15 ovens working 24 hours a day, every day for five years, how long does it take Cookie Monster to make 6 million batches of cookies." Fuentes suggested that the real number was much lower, estimating "maybe 200,000 to 300,000", and adding "six million cookies? I’m not buying it." Andrew E. Mathis, an author with The Holocaust History Project, has noted that Holocaust deniers commonly argue that the Jewish death toll was "well below 6 million", often proposing figures "anywhere between 300,000 and 1.5 million". Fuentes later said the segment was intended as a "lampoon", and he also acknowledged the Holocaust as "the systematic persecution and murder of 6 million Jews by the Nazi regime and its collaborators".

Fuentes streamed initially from the basement of his parents' home, becoming a part of his persona as a NEET-type or disconnected youth, which serves as a condition for the "focal point for the resentment of young white males". In November 2020, he moved his operations to an apartment in Berwyn, Illinois, while telling viewers he was broadcasting from his parents' basement. Whilst livestreaming, Fuentes co-hosted the Nationalist Review podcast with white nationalist James Allsup until January 2018 when they had a falling-out with accusations of "laziness, impropriety and a variety of petty slights". He spoke at the American Renaissance conference in April 2018 and later collaborated with Alex Jones to launch the livestreaming platform Cozy.tv in October 2021.

Fuentes has also been featured in several documentaries. In 2019, MTV included him prominently in White Supremacy Destroyed My Life, and in 2022 he appeared in Louis Theroux's BBC Two documentary Forbidden America: Extreme and Online, which examined far-right online subcultures in the US.

A 2022 YouTube debate by Modern-Day Debate between eight political activists, including the streamer Destiny (bottom right), and Fuentes (middle right)

Beginning in late 2024, Fuentes experienced a significant increase in visibility within segments of the American right. He appeared on numerous podcasts and livestreams, accumulating millions of views on platforms such as YouTube, Rumble, and Kick. During this period, he became a frequent guest on the American manosphere podcast Fresh & Fit with Myron Gaines and Walter Weekes, participated in debates hosted by streamer Adin Ross, and made regular appearances on Alex Jones's Infowars. As his profile expanded in 2025, Fuentes also appeared on more mainstream programs, including Patrick Bet-David's PBD Podcast, Bradley Martyn's Raw Talk, and the Nelk Boys' Kick stream. Among the right-wing and right-leaning shows he appeared on in this period were those of Glenn Greenwald, Joel Webbon, Tim Pool, Elijah Schaffer, Jake Shields, Steven Crowder, Clavicular and Keith Woods, and other manosphere streamers he appeared with were the Nelk Boys.

In October 2025, Tucker Carlson interviewed Fuentes on The Tucker Carlson Show. Carlson opened the segment by acknowledging the criticism he expected to receive, remarking, "Everybody's going to be like, 'You're a Nazi, you just like Fuentes.' But then I'm like, 'I don't think Fuentes is going away.'" The interview drew condemnation from Republican officials, conservative commentators, and Jewish organizations, who argued that Carlson had provided Fuentes with an inappropriate platform.

Heritage Foundation president Kevin Roberts defended Carlson from what he described as a "venomous coalition", while also stating that silencing Fuentes was not the solution. Roberts's remarks prompted internal backlash at Heritage, with some employees arguing that Fuentes's views were not worthy of debate. Roberts later clarified that Fuentes was "fomenting Jew hatred", calling his rhetoric immoral, un-Christian, and potentially conducive to violence. Following the controversy, Heritage announced staff reassignments.

Writing in The Atlantic, Ali Breland argued that the Carlson interview reflected the growing normalization of Fuentes's views among some supporters of the Make America Great Again movement and highlighted broader conservative divisions over antisemitism.

On December 8, 2025, Piers Morgan interviewed Fuentes on Piers Morgan Uncensored. On July 24, 2026, Fuentes and Hunter Biden, the son of former Democratic president Joe Biden, appeared together in an interview moderated by Andrew Callaghan on Channel 5.

== Influence ==
According to a 2026 analysis by The Washington Post using an AI-assisted review of livestream data, "roughly 11,000 donors have sent Fuentes nearly $900,000" since early 2025. He has said that he "makes money selling swastika-imprinted T-shirts and $100-a-month subscriptions to a private chatroom". During one stream, Fuentes responded to a supporter by saying, "we’re an invisible empire", describing building "a cadre of professionals, money people, bureaucrats", who support him "quietly, ideologically, loyally". He has said that he wants his movement "to be underground". The Post analysis further reported that 550 individuals, or 5 percent of his donors, contributed "$407,000, or 46 percent, of his donations".

In November 2025, following Fuentes's interview with Tucker Carlson, New York Times columnist Michelle Goldberg wrote that Fuentes appeared to be gaining influence. Conservative writer Rod Dreher similarly reported that a source in Washington, D.C., claimed that "something like 30–40% of staffers" under the age of 30 working for Republican Party officials or affiliated institutions were Groypers, though other observers have disputed this characterization.

Political commentator John Ganz has argued that a generational divide exists within the conservative movement: older conservatives, shaped by memories of the Holocaust and longstanding support for Christian Zionism, tend to reject Fuentes's rhetoric, while younger staff members—more immersed in online spaces and Internet forums—are "more open to Fuentes's ideas" and less constrained by traditional taboos surrounding antisemitism or criticism of civil-rights norms.

Anthropologist Sharon Moses has noted that Fuentes has emerged as a prominent white nationalist figure despite being part Hispanic, adding that he "resigns himself that his father is half Mexican but prefers to not acknowledge it as a meaningful aspect of his identity". According to Moses, Fuentes's beliefs are "rooted in a white God, white value system, and that his own skin is white".

== Political activities ==
=== Groyper Wars ===
==== Groyper War 1 ====
By 2019, America First had developed a dedicated online following whose members refer to themselves as "Groypers", consisting primarily of young, internet-based activists associated with alt-right politics. Fuentes positioned the Groypers as a challenge to mainstream conservative organizations, arguing that established groups were insufficiently aligned with populist themes associated with Donald Trump.

During the 2019 "Groyper War", Fuentes organized supporters to confront conservative speakers at events hosted by Turning Point USA (TPUSA) and similar groups. Groypers posed pointed questions on immigration, US support for Israel, and cultural issues, often disrupting events in the process. Fuentes repeatedly criticized TPUSA and its founder, Charlie Kirk, accusing them of betraying Trump's agenda by supporting mass legal immigration, foreign aid to Israel, and LGBTQ inclusion.

Throughout October and November 2019, Groypers appeared at many of Kirk's public speaking engagements, including events featuring Donald Trump Jr., Lara Trump, and Kimberly Guilfoyle. According to Mother Jones, the questions raised by Groypers frequently directed audiences toward far-right and antisemitic conspiracy theories and hoaxes online. Fuentes described the campaign as a grassroots effort to combat alleged ideological inconsistencies within mainstream conservative politics; in response, several Republican politicians and conservative commentators publicly distanced themselves from Fuentes, saying his views were extreme and outside the conservative mainstream.

One of the most widely reported incidents occurred at a book-tour event for Donald Trump Jr., where Groypers shouted down the speakers until the event ended early. In December 2019, Fuentes confronted American political commentator Ben Shapiro outside a TPUSA event in West Palm Beach, Florida, who declined to engage after Fuentes questioned him about a speech he had delivered at Stanford University criticizing him and the Groyper movement.

==== Groyper War 2 ====
In August 2024, Fuentes began a "digital war" against Trump's presidential campaign, which he dubbed "Groyper War 2". He directed his followers to make their demands trend on X and Truth Social and urged them to withhold their votes and protest Trump rallies in battleground states. Fuentes said Vance was "the end state of Trumpism" who "was created in a lab by Peter Thiel".

Fuentes took credit for Trump's rehiring of American political operative Corey Lewandowski as a senior campaign advisor in August, although Lewandowski was sidelined as a surrogate after reportedly losing in a power struggle. Fuentes said he would not vote for Trump and his running mate, JD Vance. He questioned whether Vance would "support white identity", since Vance's wife is of Indian heritage. Vance said Fuentes was a "total loser" and the campaign would not listen to him. Most conservatives agreed that he had little influence on Trump himself, a claim Fuentes agreed with himself.

In November 2024, Fuentes criticized Trump supporters for dressing in garbage bags after a rally where Trump climbed into a garbage truck in response to President Joe Biden's remarks about them. He said that this showed that "Trumpism was a cult" with "slavish devotion", characterizing Trumpism as "a giant cult-like scam". In July 2025, Fuentes criticized Trump after his refusal to release the Epstein files, as he called him a "scam artist", also stating that the "liberals were right" and "we are going to look back on the MAGA movement as the biggest scam in history".

In March 2026, Fuentes expressed frustration on Trump's apparent "Golden Age", saying that "the tariffs were refunded, the deportations were stopped" and the administration had accomplished little except for embezzling money, going to war with Iran, and burying the Epstein files. Fuentes then urged his base to "not vote in the midterms, and if you do, vote Democrat".

=== January 6 Capitol Attack ===
Deposition of Nicholas J. Fuentes, (February 16, 2022) for the United States House Select Committee on the January 6 Attack

Fuentes was among several far-right activists and groups who participated in rallies leading up to the January 6 United States Capitol attack. At a pro-Trump demonstration in Washington, D.C., in December 2020, he led a crowd in chanting "Destroy the GOP" and encouraged attendees to sit out the Senate special runoff election in Georgia. In February 2021, house delegate Stacey Plaskett played this video during the second impeachment trial of Donald Trump.

On December 8, 2020, Fuentes received approximately $250,000 worth of Bitcoin from a French donor who also sent funds to other far-right figures, with an apparent suicide note, though his status has not been confirmed. The FBI opened an investigation to determine whether any of the funds were used to support illegal activity, including the storming of the US Capitol; Fuentes was not charged with any crimes.

On December 12, 2020, the day after the US Supreme Court declined to hear Texas v. Pennsylvania, Fuentes addressed a crowd at Freedom Plaza. He told supporters, "Our Founding Fathers would get in the streets" and "take this country back by force if necessary", adding this is what "we must be prepared to do". On January 4, 2021, Fuentes discussing state legislators who refused to overturn the 2020 election results, saying, "What can you and I do to a state legislator—besides kill them? ... I'm not advising that, but I mean, what else can you do, right?"

Media outlets reported that Fuentes was present among the crowd that breached the Capitol grounds on January 6. The Southern Poverty Law Center stated that he appeared "amidst a mob of pro-Trump insurrectionists" with an apparent "VIP badge". Although he did not enter the Capitol building, he allegedly encouraged rioters by shouting, "Keep moving towards the Capitol – it appears we are taking the Capitol back! ... Break down the barriers and disregard the police. The Capitol belongs to us!" The FBI opened an investigation into Fuentes's conduct, which was closed after five months without any charges. On January 19, 2022, the United States House Select Committee on the January 6 Attack issued a subpoena to Fuentes.

=== Deplatforming and reinstatements ===
Fuentes has been banned from numerous social media platforms, financial services, and e-commerce providers since 2020, mostly due to actions attributed to violations of hate-speech and related content policies. In January 2020, he was the most viewed live streamer on the platform DLive; however, following the January 6 attack, DLive permanently suspended his channel. His YouTube channel was demonetized, and one of his videos was removed for violating the platform's hate speech rules. He had also been banned from Twitch and Reddit. On February 14, 2020, YouTube terminated his channel entirely for repeated violations of its hate-speech policies.

X indefinitely suspended Fuentes's verified account in July 2021. He had also been banned from financial and e-commerce services such as PayPal, Venmo, Patreon, Shopify, Stripe, Streamlabs, and Coinbase. According to ABC News in March 2021, Fuentes had been suspended from "almost all" social media platforms. Fuentes claimed that his bank account was frozen, he was placed on a federal no-fly list, and Airbnb, Facebook, and Instagram also banned him, describing this as "overt political persecution". In December 2021, the platform Gettr suspended him, causing backlash from his fanbase and Arizona state senator Wendy Rogers. Gettr banned use of the word groyper on the platform.

On January 25, 2023, his verified X account was briefly reinstated and banned after he praised Adolf Hitler and the Unabomber, also saying "Jews run the news." In May 2024, Elon Musk reinstated his account, adding, "I cannot claim to be a defender of free speech, but then permanently ban someone who hasn't violated the law." The ADL condemned this decision, to which Musk addressed the backlash by stating, "It is better to have anti whatever out in the open to be rebutted than to grow simmering in the darkness." Since his return, Fuentes has amassed over one million followers.

After Fuentes's bans from DLive and YouTube, America First moved to streaming on Rumble; this led to a growth in popularity, as Tucker Carlson and Jason Whitlock saw his ability to draw an audience. In September 2025, Fuentes and Alex Jones attempted to rejoin YouTube after the platform announced a limited pilot program to reinstate some previously banned channels. YouTube banned both Fuentes and Jones, as the program had not gone into effect and did not cover them.

=== America First Political Action Conference ===
Nick Fuentes founded the America First Political Action Conference (AFPAC), a white nationalist and far-right political conference that is seen as a rival to CPAC. American political commentator Michelle Malkin, fired by the Young America's Foundation over her support for Fuentes, spoke at the first two events in February 2020 and 2021. American politicians Steve King and Paul Gosar spoke at the second AFPAC.

Fuentes attempted to "start a commotion" during a CPAC event in February 2021, leading to him being barred from the Hyatt Regency Orlando. He was again removed from CPAC in July 2021 after he harassed a journalist.

Fuentes hosted the third AFPAC in February 2022, with Majorie Taylor Greene attending, while Janice McGeachin and Gosar had prerecorded videos. Mitt Romney criticized the attendance of Greene, as well as others; Greene later said that she did not know who the organizers were. The event highlighted Alexander Dugin's growing influence on the American far-right, as he blamed gay-rights, liberal values, and separation of church and state for societal decline.

AFPAC IV was cancelled because of the venue, but they held an alternative event, attended by Sulaiman Ahmed, an online anti-Israel commentator, and David Duke, who is formerly of the Ku Klux Klan.

In April 2026, The New York Times reported that Fuentes chose to discontinue AFPAC permanently due to concerns over his safety.

== Political associations ==
=== Donald Trump ===
According to the Anti-Defamation League, Fuentes has cited Donald Trump's candidacy and presidency as an inspiration for America First. The phrase "America First" is broadly associated with a nationalist and protectionist approach to US foreign policy.

==== Dinner at Mar-a-Lago ====
On November 22, 2022, Donald Trump hosted Fuentes and Kanye West for a dinner at his Mar-a-Lago residence in Florida, occurring at West's request. West later said that Trump was "really impressed with Nick Fuentes". Trump stated that West had contacted him earlier in the week to arrange a visit and that West "unexpectedly showed up with three of his friends, whom I knew nothing about", describing the dinner as "quick and uneventful". Trump later said that he met with West to "help a seriously troubled man... who has been decimated", also advising him to end his presidential campaign.

Accounts of the dinner varied. According to Axios, a source claimed Trump "seemed very taken" with Fuentes and was impressed by his ability to recall statistics and speeches from his 2016 campaign; the source said Fuentes encouraged Trump to be more "authentic", claiming his recent 2024 campaign announcement sounded scripted. Trump reportedly responded, "You like it better when I just speak off the cuff", to which Fuentes agreed, calling him an "amazing" president when unrestrained. West later said that when he asked Trump to be his vice-presidential running mate, Trump "started basically screaming at me at the table".

The meeting drew significant domestic and international attention, being condemned by commentators across the political spectrum due to Fuentes and West's antisemitic statements. It was also labeled as an "unprecedented" event, as a former president hosted guests with openly antisemitic views. The event led to rare bipartisan criticism of Trump, including from Republican congressional leaders, and raised questions about Trump's viability as a 2024 candidate.

A New York Times writer described the reaction among American Jews as "what may be the most discomfiting moment in U.S. history in a half-century or more". Critics argued that Trump's failures to condemn antisemitism amounted to tacit acceptance of the guests' views.

Trump defended the dinner on Truth Social, writing that West "expressed no anti-Semitism" during the meeting and that he "never met and knew nothing about" Fuentes. The Washington Post reported that Trump believed the controversy would "blow over", but reconsidered after subsequent actions by West and Fuentes. Former vice president Mike Pence said Trump should apologize and "denounce those individuals", and Israeli prime minister Benjamin Netanyahu called the meeting a "mistake", later adding that hosting them was "not merely unacceptable, it's just wrong".

On November 16, 2025, Trump commented on Tucker Carlson's interview with Fuentes, saying, "You can't tell him who to interview. If he wants to interview Nick Fuentes — I don't know much about him, but if he wants to do it — get the word out. People have to decide."

=== Kanye West ===
==== Involvement in the 2024 presidential campaign ====
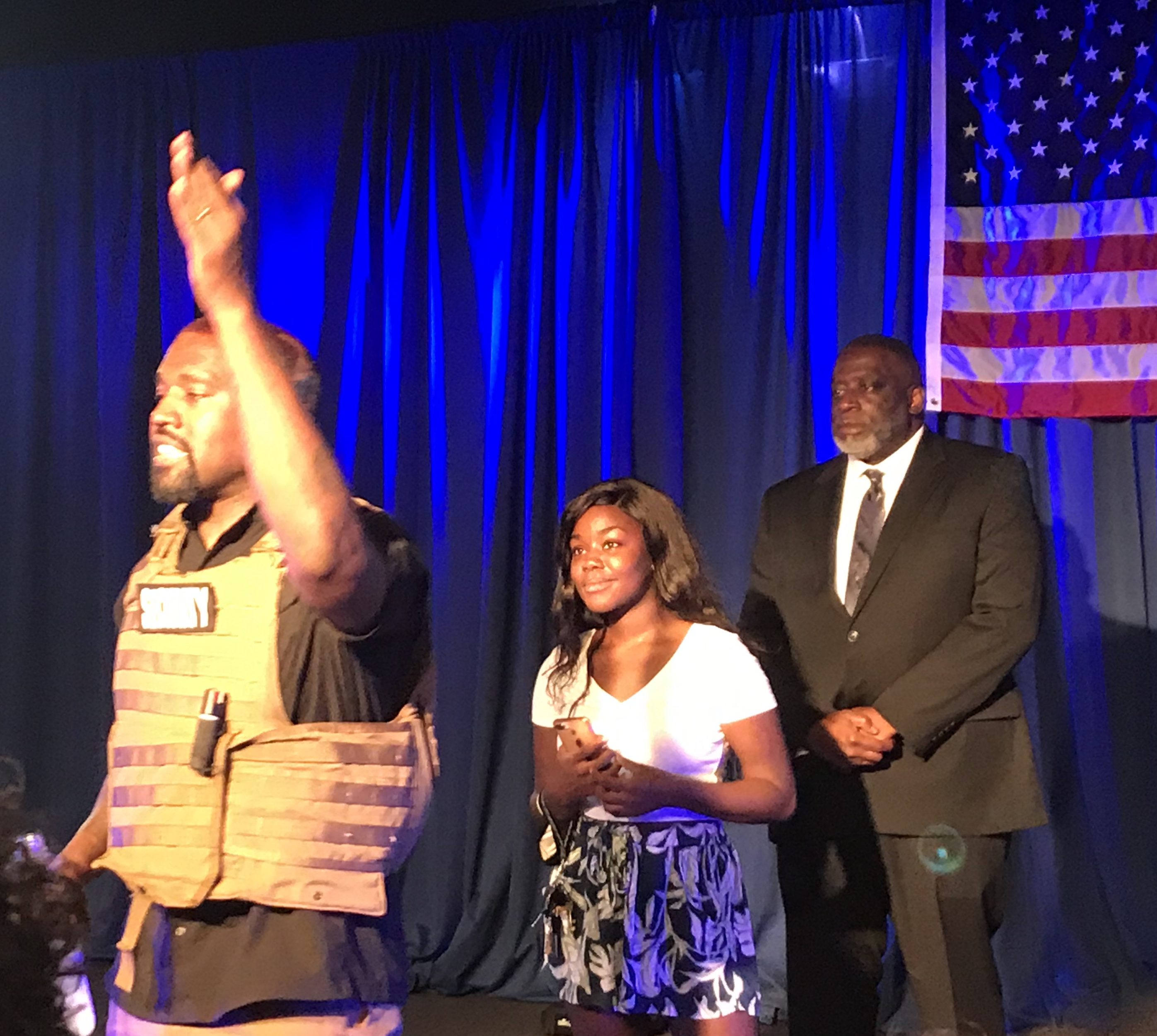
West at his first campaign rally in North Charleston, South Carolina, on July 19, 2020

In late 2022, Fuentes switched from supporting Donald Trump to promoting Kanye West's presidential campaign, as well as far-right streamer Sneako. On November 28, 2022, Tim Pool interviewed West, Fuentes, and Milo Yiannopoulos about West's campaign. When Pool pressed West and Fuentes about criticism from Mike Pence regarding their dinner with Trump, both refused to apologize and walked out of the interview.

In a December 2022 interview with Alex Jones, West declared that he "loves" Adolf Hitler and denied the Holocaust. Fuentes did not directly comment on West's statements but expressed agreement throughout the discussion. Days later, West and Fuentes appeared on Canadian far-right commentator Gavin McInnes's show, where they claimed Hitler's reputation had been "crafted by Jews", also adding that the US should be governed by "Christian principles" and the media should be controlled by Christians.

Following controversies involving Fuentes and fellow West supporter Ali Alexander, West dismissed both Fuentes and Alexander from his campaign, with assistance from Yiannopoulos, who had rejoined the team after previously departing.

==== 2025 single song ====
In April 2025, during a Kick livestream hosted by Sneako and producer Digital Nas, Fuentes watched West record the 2025 single song "Heil Hitler;" Fuentes predicted the track would become the "song of the summer", saying, "Imagine 50,000 people in a stadium on their feet singing every word." In January 2026, Fuentes drew widespread attention after being filmed dancing to "Heil Hitler" at a Miami nightclub alongside Andrew Tate, Clavicular, Sneako, and Myron Gaines. Miami Beach mayor Steven Meiner later apologized for the incident and banned Fuentes from the venue.

=== Ali Alexander ===
In 2023, Fuentes and associates were involved in a scandal about Fuentes's friend, Ali Alexander. Two accusers, 17 and 15 years old, respectively, stated Alexander asked for pornographic images and encouraged sexual intercourse.

One accuser said he believed Fuentes was "100 percent aware" of the alleged situation, yet did not intervene at the time. The other accuser said "Nick personally asked me to apologize to Ali for supposedly faking the messages." Fuentes denied the allegations.

US representative Marjorie Taylor Greene requested an FBI investigation, stating, "This is disgusting textbook predation of underage boys. And Nick Fuentes was in on it." Yiannopoulos, a "one-time Alexander ally", alleged he sent a text to Fuentes in January 2022, which read, "Alexander wants to come to your events to have sex with underage boys. Snap out of it."

Alexander later apologized for "any inappropriate messages sent over the years", but did not offer any specifics in regard to the allegations.

== Views ==
=== Overview ===
During the March 28, 2025, broadcast of America First, streamed on Rumble, Fuentes delivered a monologue in which he made a series of derogatory and inflammatory statements about multiple groups. During the segment, he said:

Everybody kind of realizes women need to be taken down a peg. Women are in control, women are running our lives, they're clearly not up to the task, they need to be taken down a peg. ... Jews are running society, women need to shut the fuck up, Blacks need to be imprisoned for the most part, and we would live in paradise, it's that simple. It's literally that simple. ... White men need to run the household, they need to run the country, they need to run the companies. They just need to run everything. That's a pretty good heuristic.

New York Times columnist Michelle Goldberg described these remarks as a distillation of his ideology, noting that his "sneering, proudly transgressive attitude has made him a hero to legions of mostly young men who resent all forms of political gatekeeping".

=== Nationalism and identity ===
==== White nationalism ====
Fuentes has promoted alt-right, white nationalist, and anti-immigration views that emphasize racial and religious identity, opposition to multiculturalism, and criticism of mainstream conservatism. He said he is a "reactionary" and wants to transform the Republican Party into "a truly reactionary party". The SPLC and ADL report that Fuentes seeks to replace mainstream conservatism with alt-right ideology and has criticized conservative organizations by claiming that "Christian Republican voters get screwed over" because "the GOP is run by Jews, atheists, and homosexuals".

Following his attendance at the 2017 Unite the Right rally, Fuentes spoke positively about what he called "a tidal wave of white identity" and has described America's "white demographic core" as central to national identity. He has discussed the white genocide conspiracy theory, and has also characterized the term "white supremacist" as an "anti-white slur". According to the SPLC, Fuentes has stated that the US should be a white, Christian nation, rejecting the idea of a "Judeo-Christian" country. He has also used derogatory language to describe Chicago.

==== Christian nationalism ====
Fuentes identifies with traditionalist Catholicism, and has also described himself as an integralist and Christian nationalist. In a 2019 episode of America First, he praised the idea of "Catholic fascism", expressing support for authoritarian Catholic movements and referencing figures such as Francisco Franco, Benito Mussolini, and Oswald Mosley. He has called for a Catholic theocracy modeled on far-right movements in countries such as Argentina and Hungary. Fuentes has said, "You're either a Catholic or you're with the Jews", and has advocated for Catholic control of government and media. He has referred to the US government as "Jewish-occupied" and has expressed support for autocracy, Catholic monarchy or dictatorship, just war theory, the Crusades, and the Inquisition, while opposing forms of democracy. Despite his claims to be a Catholic, Catholic publications have lambasted his views, with Crisis Magazine stating that Fuentes has said things that "no Catholic should defend" and National Catholic Reporter noting that Fuente's views were "wrong" and should be condemned.

Fuentes supports and has praised the leadership of totalitarian dictators, such as Adolf Hitler and Joseph Stalin. Fuentes has described Islam as "a barbaric ideology" and argued in 2017 that the First Amendment "was not written for Muslims or immigrants". He has also expressed support for the Taliban's governance in Afghanistan.

=== Antisemitism ===
Sources widely describe Fuentes as holding antisemitic views and as a Holocaust denier. He has praised Adolf Hitler and stated on America First, "Hitler is awesome. Hitler was right. And the Holocaust didn't happen." In his December 2025 interview with Piers Morgan, he referred to Hitler as "fucking cool", and mocked a relative of a Holocaust survivor.

Fuentes has promoted antisemitic conspiracy theories and has called for a "holy war" against Jews. He has claimed that "Jews stood in the way" of overturning Roe v. Wade, and argued that the Dobbs decision meant that "banning gay marriage... banning sodomy... [and] banning contraceptives" were again possible, which he described as "Taliban rule in America, in a good way". He has said "Jews are money changers, bullshit artists, psychopaths, charlatans, grifters, manipulators... They're like gypsies."

At AFPAC 2022, he delivered remarks described as "giggling praise" on Hitler. In 2025, Fuentes said his antisemitic views had moderated with age, though The New York Times reported that his recent statements contradicted that claim.

=== Foreign policy ===
==== Isolationism ====
Fuentes has described his foreign-policy outlook as broadly isolationist, though he has made exceptions regarding US influence in the Western Hemisphere. In October 2025, he argued that the US should maintain dominance in Latin America, stating that the country is engaged in "great power competition" with China and Russia. He expressed support for threatening Venezuela over its natural resources, saying the US should "take their stuff", while clarifying that he did not support regime change.

==== Russia and Ukraine ====
Fuentes has expressed support for several authoritarian governments and movements. On March 10, 2022, he praised Vladimir Putin during the Russian invasion of Ukraine, referring to him as "czar Putin" and claiming the invasion was intended to "liberate Ukraine" from US influence, calling the US an "evil empire". At the 2022 AFPAC event, it was marked by support for Russia's invasion of Ukraine. Jared Holt, a domestic extremism researcher, stated that this support was rooted in the alleged belief that Western influence had contributed to cultural decline in Ukraine.

During his remarks at the event, Fuentes referenced media comparisons between Putin and Adolf Hitler, saying these comparisons were not inherently negative. He further encouraged applause for Russia, prompting audience chants of "Putin! Putin!" Fuentes led a prayer for Russian forces and dismissed statements by US officials, including Kamala Harris, regarding alleged Russian war crimes. He also prompted false claims about casualty numbers and Russia's motivations for the conflict.

==== China and Taiwan ====
Fuentes has voiced support for Chinese unification with Taiwan. In 2022, he stated that he wanted China to "take back Taiwan" and Russia to "take back Ukraine", framing these positions as a desire to see the US "humiliated".

==== Taliban and Afghanistan ====
Fuentes has praised aspects of Taliban governance, particularly in regard to its conservative religious framework. Although he has been described by observers as holding negative views toward Muslims, he has said that his political ideal is a form of "Catholic Taliban rule" in the US.

Following the Taliban's takeover of Afghanistan in August 2021, he wrote on Telegram that the group represented a "conservative, religious force", while the US was "godless and liberal", adding that the collapse of the US-backed Afghan government was "a positive development".

==== Israel ====
Fuentes is a vocal critic of Israel and US support for the country. He has argued that the US should withdraw its backing, stating, "We're European, they're ethnically Jewish."

Fuentes describes himself as an “anti-Zionist”. He is a critic of Christian Zionism.

After the October 7 attacks, he claimed that the events were staged to justify broader military action by Israel to "destroy Iran and its proxies".

=== Domestic policy ===
==== Immigration ====
Fuentes has consistently advocated against immigration, particularly non-white immigration, and mass migration to the US; he also wants to heavily enforce mass deportations. Fuentes has said that if he were president, he would deport "tens of millions" of immigrants, arguing that they "have to be returned because they have no legal standing here", saying that the US was not designed with a "multiracial religiously pluralistic society in mind". In response to the 2026 shooting by US Border Patrol agents of Alex Pretti in Minnesota, Fuentes told his viewers that if they want to stop immigration enforcement because of those acts, "You will lose. You have blinked."

In June 2025, he boasted that "I've never seen the right wing so angry and so explicitly against mass migration", adding that they were so close "to expressing their disdain in racial terms", citing figures like Matt Walsh and Charlie Kirk. However, he has argued that Trump is not doing enough, saying that "we need more detention centers" and "we need more militarization of the cities", including bringing "in the National Guard everywhere". Fuentes does support some levels of immigration, especially from South Africa and areas of Europe.

==== COVID-19 ====
Fuentes has repeatedly promoted conspiracy theories and misinformation about COVID-19 vaccines. He responded to one of his fans, saying, "I just want to impress upon you the severity of the situation. You are talking about ‘gene therapy’ in your veins." Mark Lynas, a visiting fellow at Cornell University’s Alliance for Science group, said that no vaccine would "genetically modify human DNA". Fuentes has also claimed that taking the vaccine could lead to "mandated vaccine passports", leaving citizens to be allegedly "owned" by their government, adding that he would "never get a COVID vaccine".

In December 2020, Fuentes reportedly had an altercation on a flight over mask mandates, as well as a possible fight with a flight attendant. By April 2021, Salon reported that Fuentes and his supporters had aligned themselves with anti-vaccine activists. That same year, he participated in an anti-vaccine event in Staten Island, stating that "they are gonna have to kill me before I get this vaccine."

==== Criticism of JD Vance ====
According to The New York Times, Fuentes wants to undermine the political ambitions of JD Vance; he has characterized him as a "complete fabrication" that was "created in a lab by Peter Thiel", adding that he would not support a candidate with a mixed-race family.

==== Jeffrey Epstein ====
Fuentes has repeatedly criticized the second Trump administration's handling of files related to the deceased financier and convicted sex offender Jeffrey Epstein, while also promoting conspiracy theories casting Epstein as part of a global Jewish cabal. In July 2025, he denounced Trump after the president criticized his own supporters for continuing to press for the files' release, telling viewers "Trump sold us out" and that "Trumpism" was "a cult". He later accused the administration of engaging in a "cover-up" over its shifting statements about the existence of the files.

In January 2026, a clip from the America First podcast circulated on social media in which Fuentes argued that Epstein was "not a pedophile," stating that his victims were of an age considered marriageable under canon law rather than young children, and telling viewers:

"It's not really pedophilia. They weren't trafficking 5-year-olds."

He went on to describe Epstein admiringly as "probably the coldest, coolest guy you know". Legal commentators noted that U.S. federal child sex-trafficking statutes apply regardless of a victim's specific age below 18, and that Epstein's known victims included teenagers recruited through coercion.

Fuentes later wore a sweatshirt on his show closely resembling one Epstein was known to wear, with the monogram altered from "JEE" to "USA," and began selling the item on his website, which he said became his top-selling merchandise of the year. The New York Times noted that commentary of this kind coincided with Fuentes and other right-wing figures increasingly treating the Epstein saga as fodder for memes and merchandise.

=== Women, abortion, and sexuality ===
==== Women ====
Fuentes has made numerous statements expressing opposition to women's political and social equality. In a 2022 interview with British journalist Louis Theroux, he said it would be preferable if women "did not have the right to vote". In November 2025, he stated that, if elected president, he would "take away the right to vote for tons of people. Women for sure".

He has also made remarks about women's role and capabilities. In a 2023 appearance on the Fresh and Fit podcast, Fuentes described women as "baby machines", asserting that this was "what their brains are about". He has said that the "optimal" age for a wife is 16, a claim he justified with the phrase "right when the milk is good". Fuentes has minimized the seriousness of sexual violence, stating that rape is "not so a big deal" and claiming that "a lot of women want to be raped". He has also argued that women should occupy a subordinate role within marriage.

On February 11, 2026, Fuentes criticized women's educational attainment on his program America First, claiming that women "getting educated" was harming fertility rates. He argued that "every woman and girl" should be sent to "breeding gulags", adding that society would then "determine which ones are acceptable" for release, comparing this to Adolf Hitler's imprisonment of political opponents. He also stated that women were "the number one political enemy in America".

In an interview with Piers Morgan, Fuentes accepted Morgan's characterization of him as a "misogynist, old dinosaur".

==== Abortion ====
Avatar of Nicholas J. Fuentes

Nicholas J. Fuentes
(@NickJFuentes)
tweeted:

Your body, my choice. Forever.

November 5, 2024

Following the Supreme Court's 2022 decision in Dobbs v. Jackson Women’s Health Organization, which overturned Roe v. Wade, Fuentes praised the ruling.

After the 2024 US presidential election, he mocked abortion-rights supporters by posting "Your body, my choice. Forever" on X, a reversal of the slogan "My body, my choice." The phrase subsequently spread widely on TikTok, where female users reported receiving mass comments repeating it. A report by the Institute for Strategic Dialogue documented a sharp increase across social media platforms following the election, as well as instances of its appearance on school and university campuses.

==== Sexuality ====
Fuentes has been described by researchers as a prominent figure within the incel movement. Scholars Johnson and Kennedy-Kollar argue that he has used his platform to appeal to young men who feel socially marginalized or threatened by feminism. Fuentes has at times referred to himself as a "proud incel", though he has made contradictory statements about his own sexual behavior.

He has said that sex with women is "gay" and that asexuality is the only appropriate stance for heterosexual men. He has also expressed interest in marrying a 16-year-old girl, describing that age as "right when the milk is good".

Fuentes has frequently criticized LGBTQ identities and rights and has made homophobic remarks. He has claimed that there is an "LGBT agenda" and has described transgender people and same-sex marriage as forms of "deviancy".

== Personal life ==
Fuentes has stated that he is a "proud incel", referring to an online subculture of mostly heterosexual men who identify as "involuntarily celibate"—unable to obtain a romantic or sexual partner despite wanting one—and which is often associated with feelings of rejection and social isolation.

In November 2024, the address of Fuentes's home in Berwyn, Illinois, was posted on X after he mocked abortion-rights advocates with the message "Your body, my choice. Forever." This referenced the pro-abortion rights slogan "my body, my choice." The group Anonymous wrote on X that "Nick Fuentes has been fully doxed and it's being shared to millions of women across every social media platform."

During his 2025 interview on Piers Morgan Uncensored, Fuentes addressed speculation about his sexuality that had circulated online, by clarifying that he is "attracted to women". When asked by Morgan if he was gay, he answered: "No, but I will say that women are very difficult to be around, so there's that." When asked whether he ever had sex, he said: "No, absolutely not".

=== Battery arrest ===
Fuentes pushing Marla Rose shortly after allegedly pepper-spraying her

On November 10, 2024, Marla Rose approached Fuentes's home in Berwyn, Illinois, and attempted to ring his doorbell. According to police reports and media accounts, Fuentes allegedly pepper-sprayed Rose, pushed her down the front steps, and took her phone, which she had been using to record the encounter. She said she was angered by Fuentes's viral post on X reading, "Your body, my choice. Forever."

Fuentes was arrested on November 27, 2024, and charged with battery. The Berwyn Police Department's incident report stated that "Rose kept knocking on Fuentes’ door until he answered", leading to a heated exchange between the two. Fuentes was released on the same day and appeared in court on December 19, 2024.

In December 2025, Fuentes reached a plea agreement, requiring him to complete 75 hours of community service, attend an anger management course, pay restitution for Rose's damaged phone, and deliver an apology to her in court. Under the terms of the agreement, the charge would be dismissed if he fulfilled these conditions by January 23, 2026.

=== Alleged assassination attempt ===
CCTV footage from outside Fuentes's home

On December 18, 2024, at approximately 11:30 p.m. CST, a man armed with a pistol and a crossbow arrived at Fuentes's home. The individual was later identified as 24-year-old John Lyons of Westchester, Illinois, who was suspected of killing a mother and her two adult children earlier that day in Mahomet, Illinois.

After police responded to the scene, Lyons fled and forced his way into a neighboring residence, where he killed two dogs. He then ran into a backyard, refused police commands, and exchanged gunfire with officers before being fatally shot.

Fuentes stated after the incident that, "While heartbreaking, it could have been so unimaginably worse", adding "God have mercy. Doxing is not a game." Police have not connected Lyons to the incident at Fuentes's home. The alleged assassination attempt happened the night before he was scheduled to appear in Cook County court for battery.
