= Jacket =

Clothing for the upper body

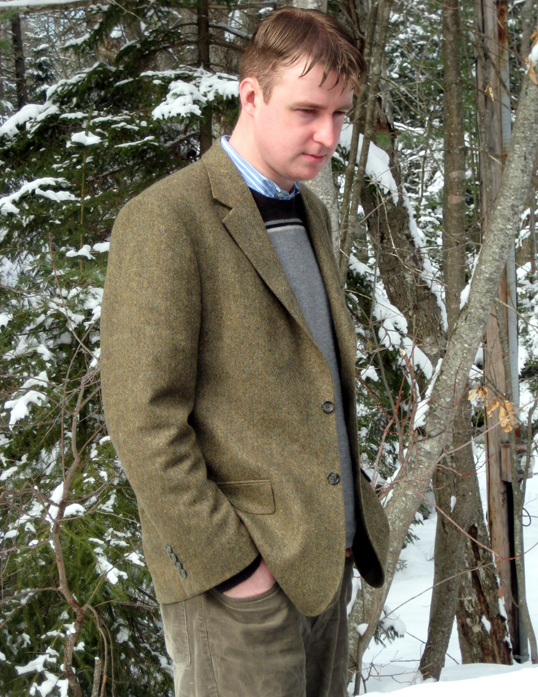
A man wearing a sports jacket

A jacket is a garment for the upper body, usually extending below the hips. A jacket typically has long or short sleeves and fastens in the front or slightly on the side. Jackets without sleeves are vests. A jacket is generally lighter, tighter-fitting, and less insulating than a coat, but both are outerwear. Some jackets are fashionable, while some others serve as protective clothing.

== Etymology ==
The word jacket comes from the French word jaquette. The term comes from the Middle French noun jaquet, which refers to a small or lightweight tunic. In Modern French, jaquette is synonymous with jacket. Speakers of American English sometimes informally use the words jacket and coat interchangeably. The word is cognate with Spanish jaco and Italian giacca or giacchetta, first recorded around 1350s. It is ultimately loaned from Arabic shakk (شكّ), which in turn was loaned from Aramaic and Hebrew saḳ (שַׂק).

== List of jackets ==
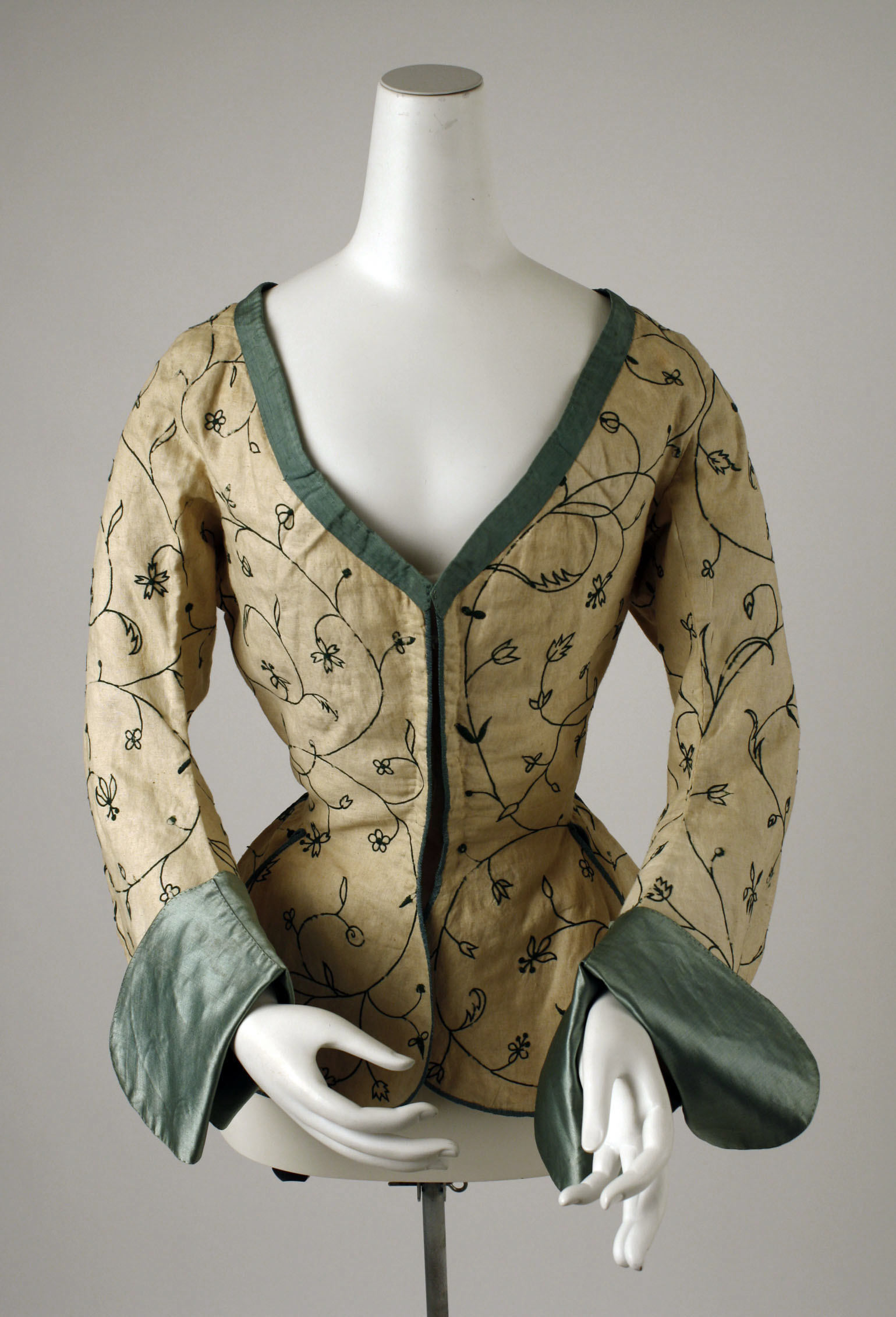
British jacket, ca. 1600–1625, linen, silk, wool. Metropolitan Museum of Art.

- Atilla, a fancy Hungarian shell-jacket or short coat, decorated with braided cord and knots
- Ball jacket, often specified as a baseball jacket or football jacket, a casual jacket with knitted cuffs, collar, and waistband and a zippered front
- Bed jacket, a jacket made from lightweight material designed to be worn in bed
- Blazer, similar to but more casual than a suit jacket; single- or double-breasted of sturdy material, commonly with metal buttons.
- Blouson, a military-style waist-length jacket.
- Bolero, a very short jacket for everyone, originally worn by matadors
- Bomber jacket, a blouson originally designed for US aircrews in leather or nylon.
- Brunswick, a two-piece woman's gown of the mid-eighteenth century.
- Caraco, a woman's jacket of the 18th century.
- Chef's jacket
- Chore jacket or chore coat, a jacket made of denim or other robust cloth, with large front pockets, originally a piece of workwear
- Dinner jacket, part of the black-tie dress code of evening formal wear. Also known as a Dinner suit and a Tuxedo.
- Donkey jacket
- Doublet (clothing)
- Down jacket, a quilted jacket filled with down feathers
- Eisenhower jacket, a waist-length, fitted, military-inspired jacket with a waistband based on the World War II British Army's Battle Dress jacket introduced by General Dwight Eisenhower
- Field jacket, a jacket that is worn by soldiers on the battlefield or doing duties in cold weather. The field jacket came about during World War II with the US Army introducing the M-1941 and the M-1943 field jackets and issuing them to its troops. The most well-known and the most popular type of military field jacket that is on the market today is the M-1965 or M-65 field jacket which came into US military service in 1965.
- Flak jacket, 20th century armoured vest
- Fleece jacket, a casual jacket made of synthetic wool such as Polar Fleece
- Flight jacket, also known as a bomber jacket
- Fracket, disposable outerwear for college parties
- Gilet, a sleeveless jacket or vest.
- Harrington jacket, a lightweight waist-length jacket
- Heated jacket
- Hoodie, a zippered hooded sweatshirt (non zippered can be considered a sweatshirt only)
- Jean jacket or denim jacket, a jacket falling slightly below the waist, usually of denim, with buttoned band cuffs like a shirt and a waistband that can be adjusted by means of buttons. Also called Levi's jacket (see Levi's)
- Jerkin, the jerkin is a man's short close-fitting jacket
- Kilt jacket, one of several styles of traditional Scottish jacket worn with the kilt, including the Argyll jacket, the Prince Charlie jacket, and a type of tweed jacket
- Leather jacket, also known as a motorcycle jacket
- Letter jacket also known as a letterman or varsity jacket
- Mackinaw jacket
- Mess jacket or eton jacket, similar to a tailcoat but cut off just below the waist. Worn as part of mess dress and formerly as the school uniform of boys under 5'4" at Eton College until 1976 and at many other English schools, particularly choir schools
- Motorcycle jacket, a leather jacket, usually black, worn by motorcycle riders; originally to mid-thigh, now usually to a fitted waist
- Nehru jacket
- Norfolk jacket
- Parka, a jacket like the related anorak, is a type of coat with a hood
- Peplum jacket, a jacket featuring a short overskirt
- Puffer jacket or Puffa jacket, a type of padded jacket popular in the 1990s
- Quarter Zip, or 1/4 zip, a jacket with a partial zipper extending down from the collar
- Rain jacket, a short rain coat
- Hardshell jacket, a wind and waterproof jacket typically made of breathable synthetic materials, lacking insulation and fabric softness
- Reefing jacket or reefer, a type of pea coat
- Riding jacket, part of a riding habit
- Sailor jacket
- Satin jacket, a type of ball jacket made of satin and popular in the 1950s
- Smart jacket, with built-in heating elements on the chest, hands and back. It keeps the wearer warm in cold weather. It comes with special sensors to let the wearer adjust the heat output as per his convenience.
- Smoking jacket
- Spencer, a high-waisted jacket dating to the Regency period
- Sport coat (US), also called a sports jacket (UK) or hacking jacket, a tailored jacket, similar in cut to a suit coat but more utilitarian, originally casual wear for hunting, riding, and other outdoor sports; specific types include a shooting jacket and hacking jacket
- Suit jacket, also called a lounge jacket, a general term for jackets used in traditional suits, such as sport coats, blazers, dinner jackets and smoking jackets.
- Tunic, a thigh-length coat or jacket worn with a wide range of military and civilian uniforms
- Windbreaker (N. American, Japan) or windcheater (UK)
- Tracksuit jacket
- Wamus, also called a "roundabout," a traditional American term for a short jacket.
A gallery of various types of jackets

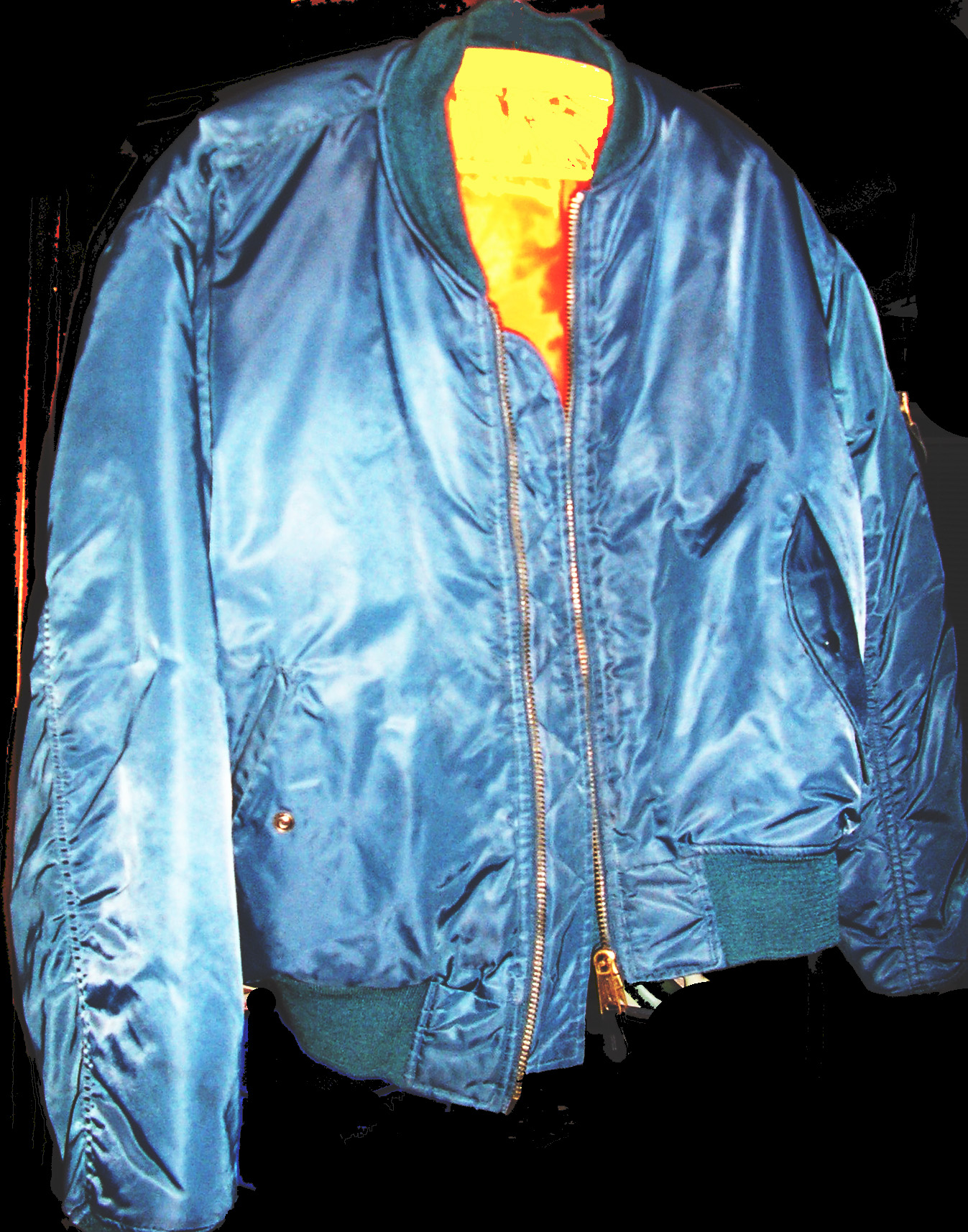
Nylon bomber jacket, also in leather

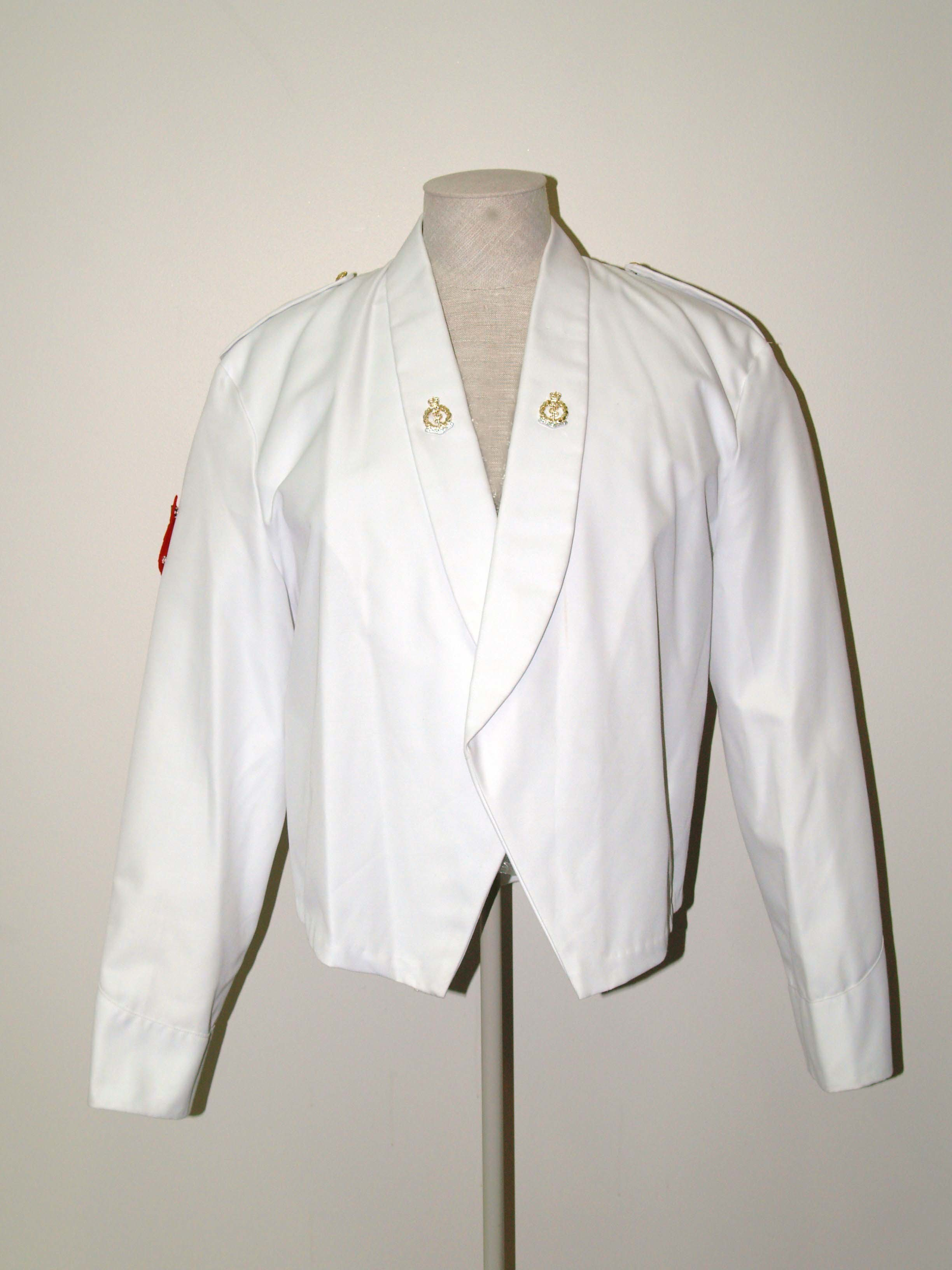
A mess jacket

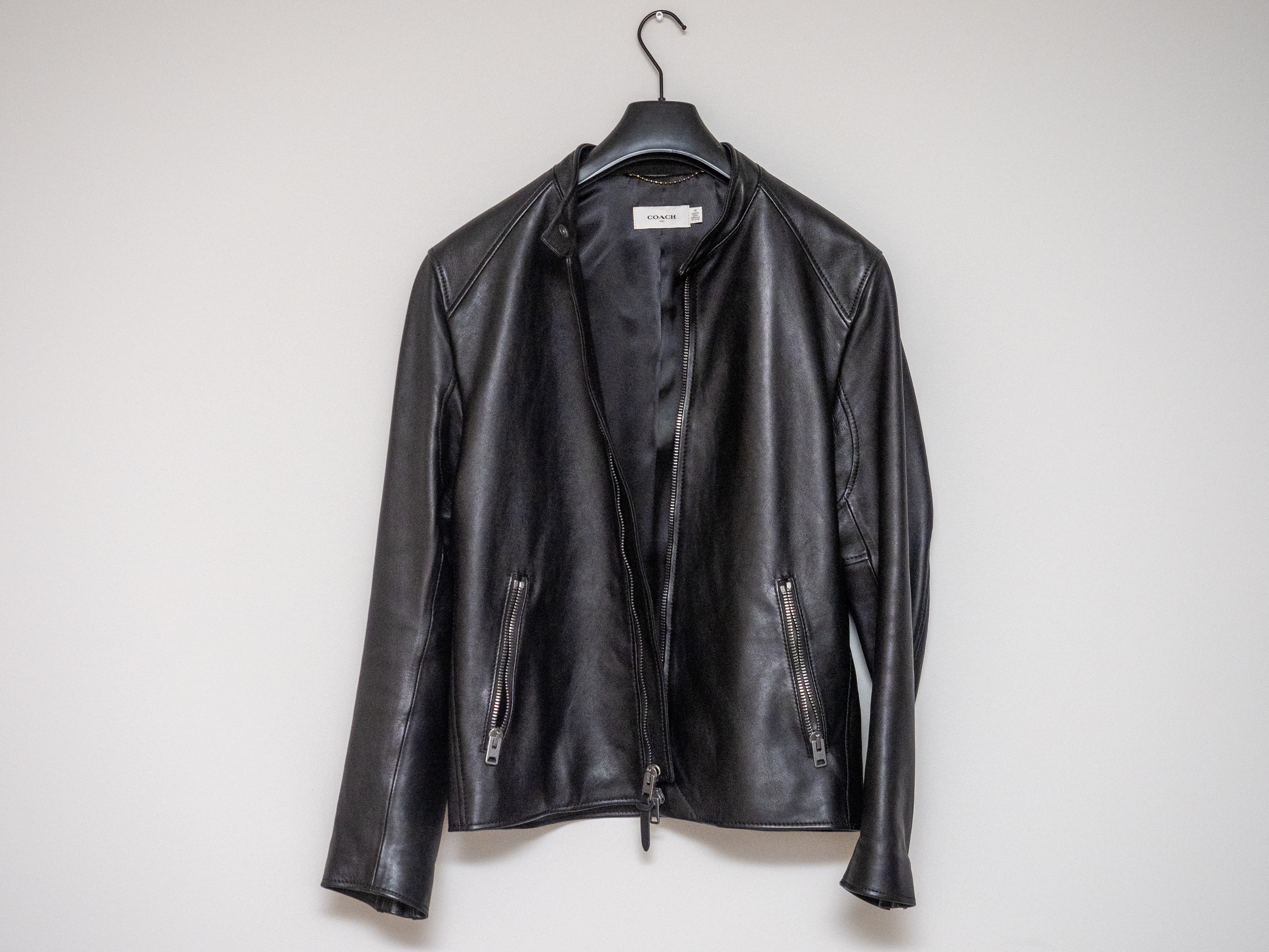
A leather jacket

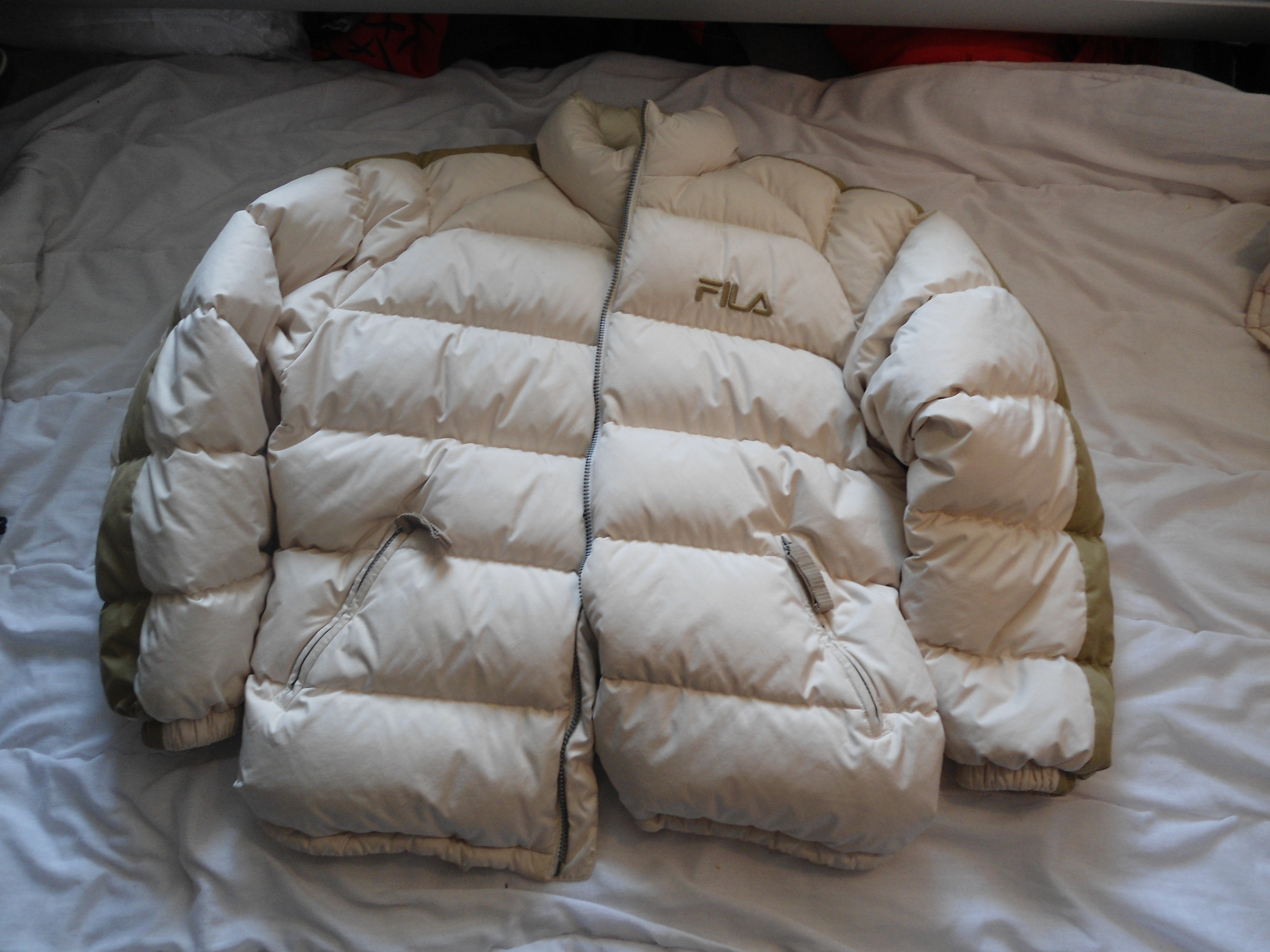
A down jacket

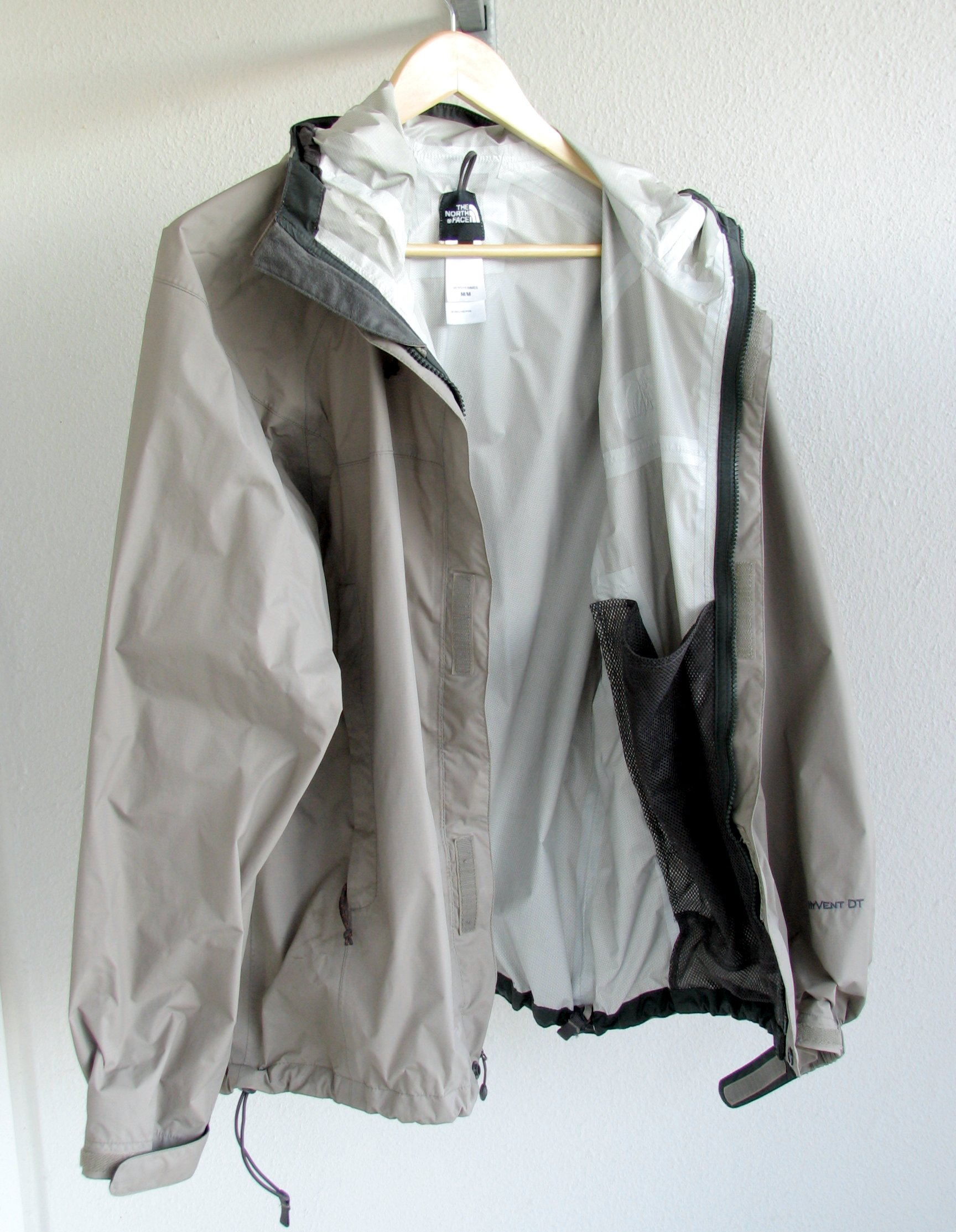
A waterproof jacket

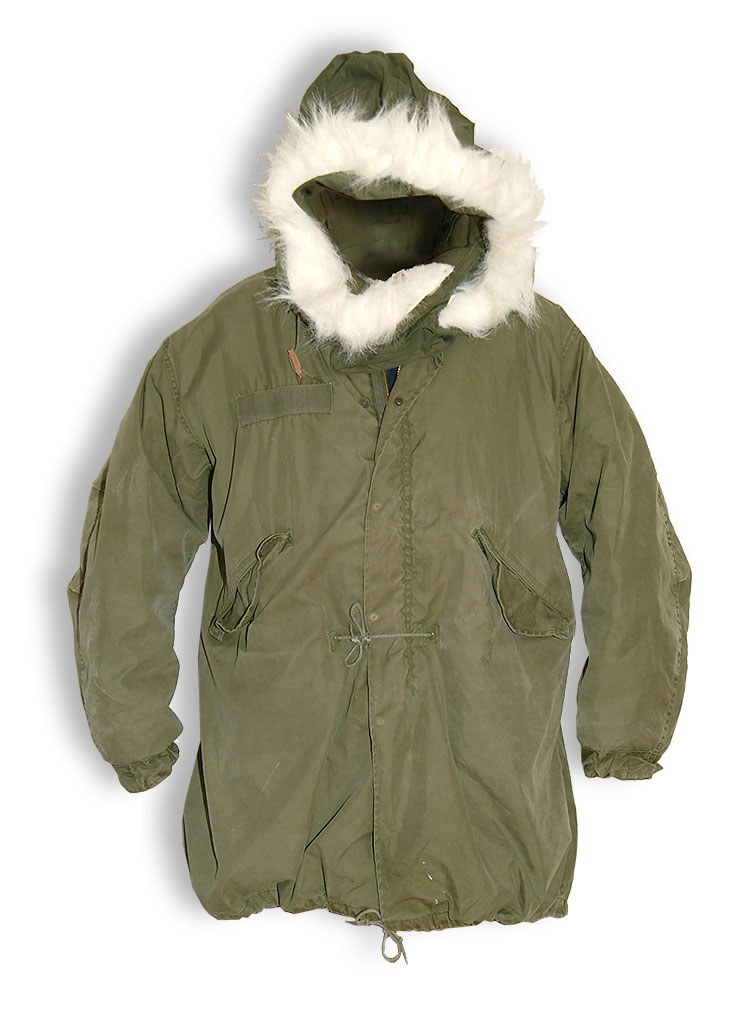
A parka

== See also ==
- Sweater
- Sweatshirt
- Trousers
- Skirts
