= Caraco =

18th century style of woman's jacket

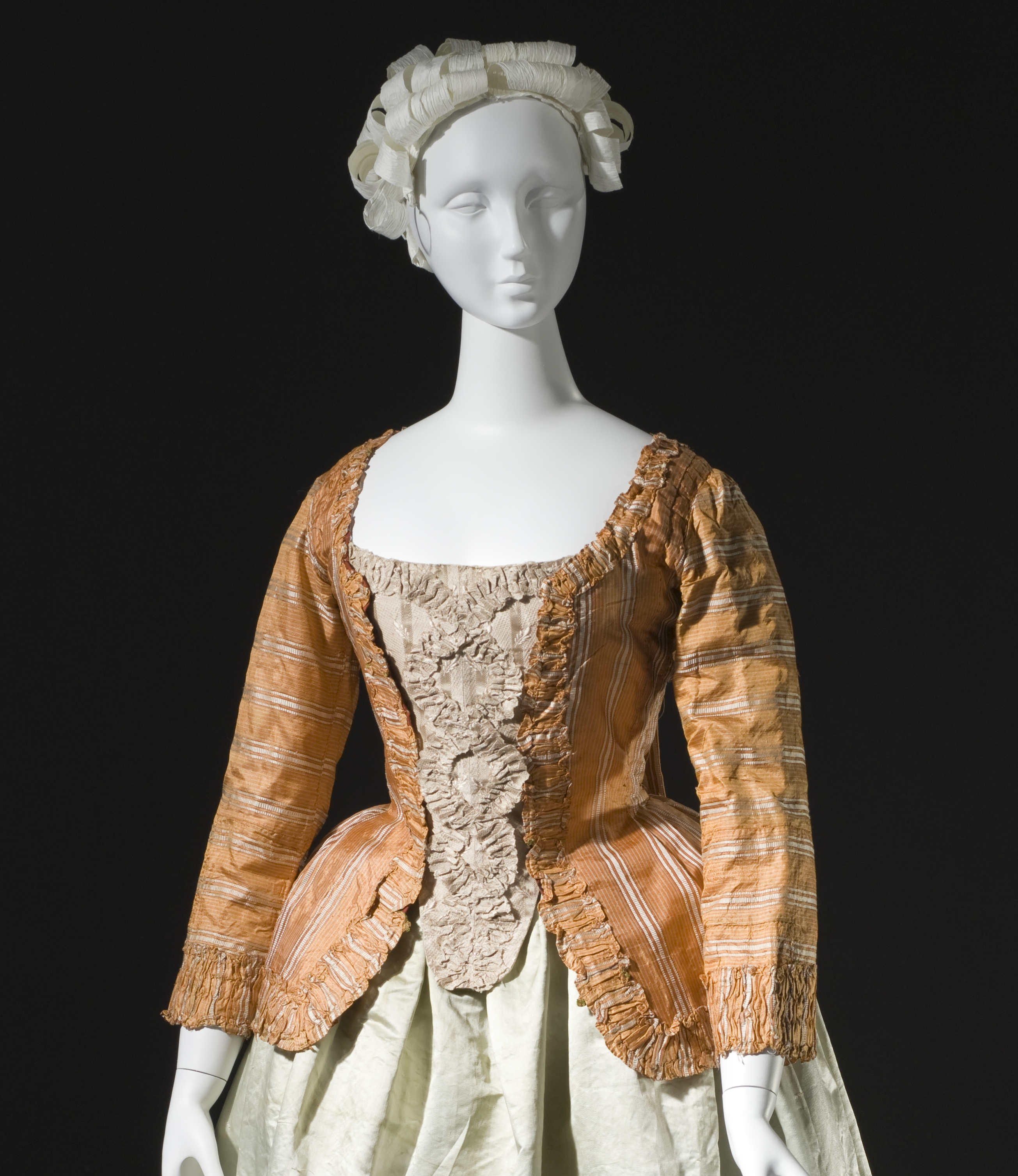
Woman's striped silk sack-back caraco, 1760s, altered 1780s. Los Angeles County Museum of Art, M.2007.211.3.

A caraco is a style of woman's jacket that was fashionable from the mid-18th to early 19th centuries. Caracos were thigh-length and opened in front, with tight three-quarter or long sleeves. Like gowns of the period, the back of the caraco could be fitted to the waist or could hang in pleats from the shoulder in the style of a sack back. Caracos were generally made of printed linen or cotton.

The caraco emerged as an informal style in France in the 1760s, based on working-class jackets. It was worn with a petticoat and, if open in front, a stomacher or decorative stays. The English caraco was generally closed in front. A similar garment with a wrap front, called in English a bedgown or short gown, was the standard working woman's costume of the later 18th century.

== Gallery ==
Women's jackets and short gowns of the 18th century

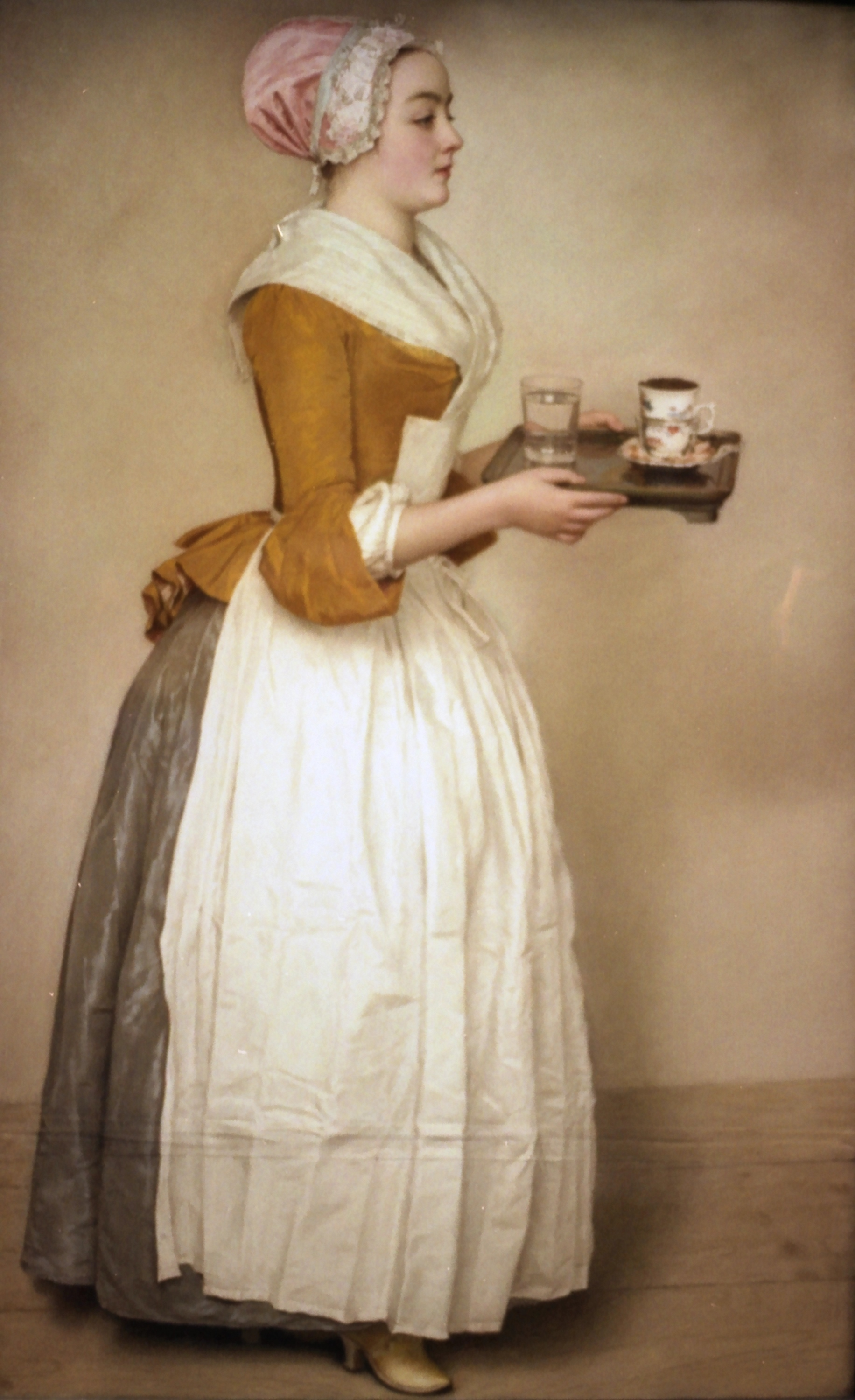
The Chocolate Girl, 1743–45, wears a fitted jacket, petticoat, and apron.

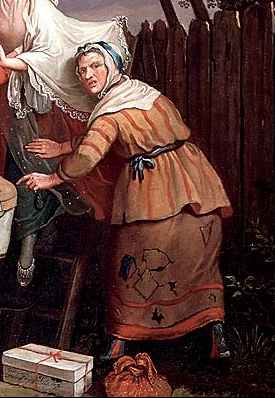
Working woman's bedgown and petticoat, 1764.

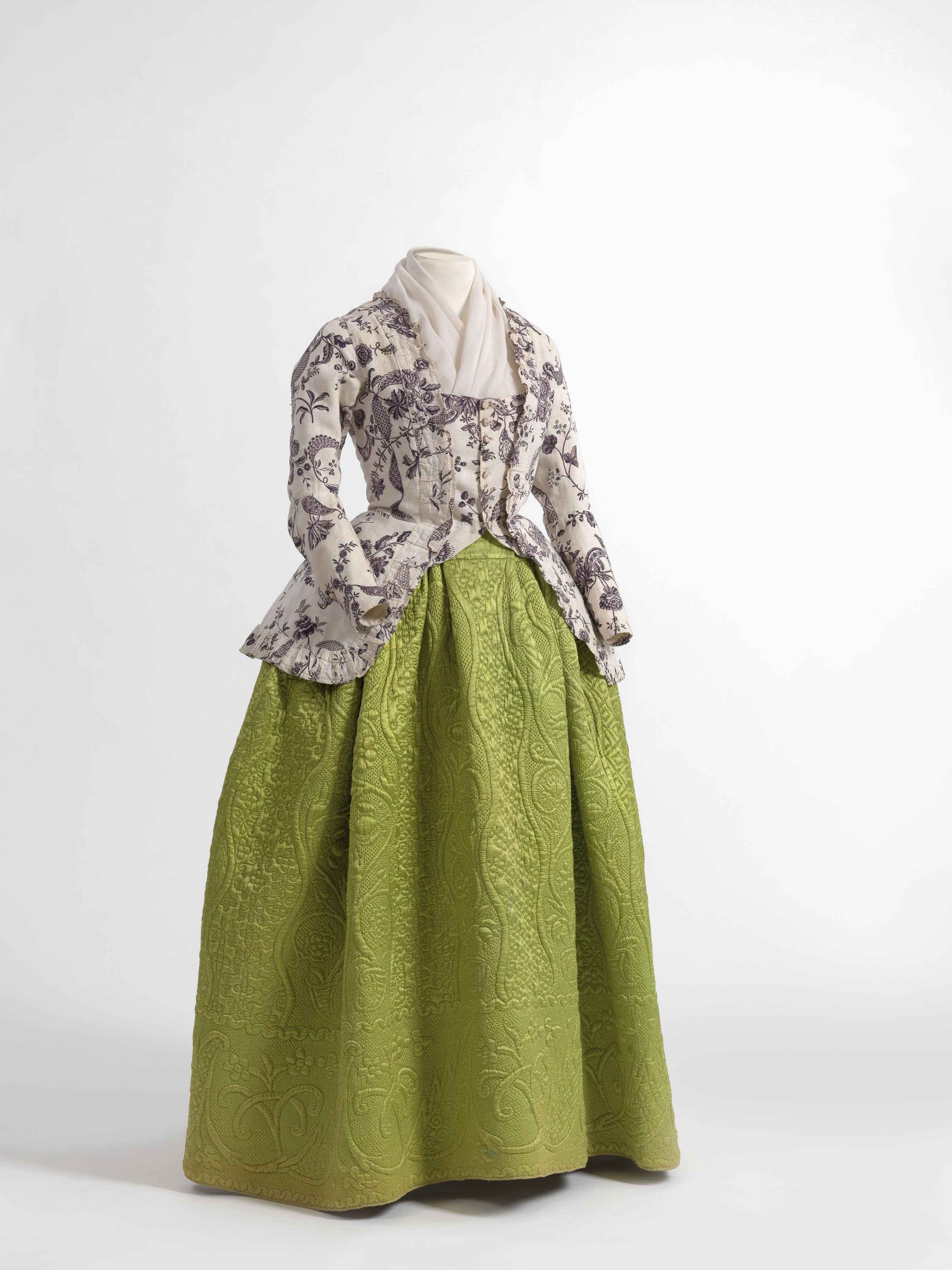
Caraco jacket in printed cotton and skirt in quilted silk satin, 1770-1790, ModeMuseum Provincie Antwerpen.

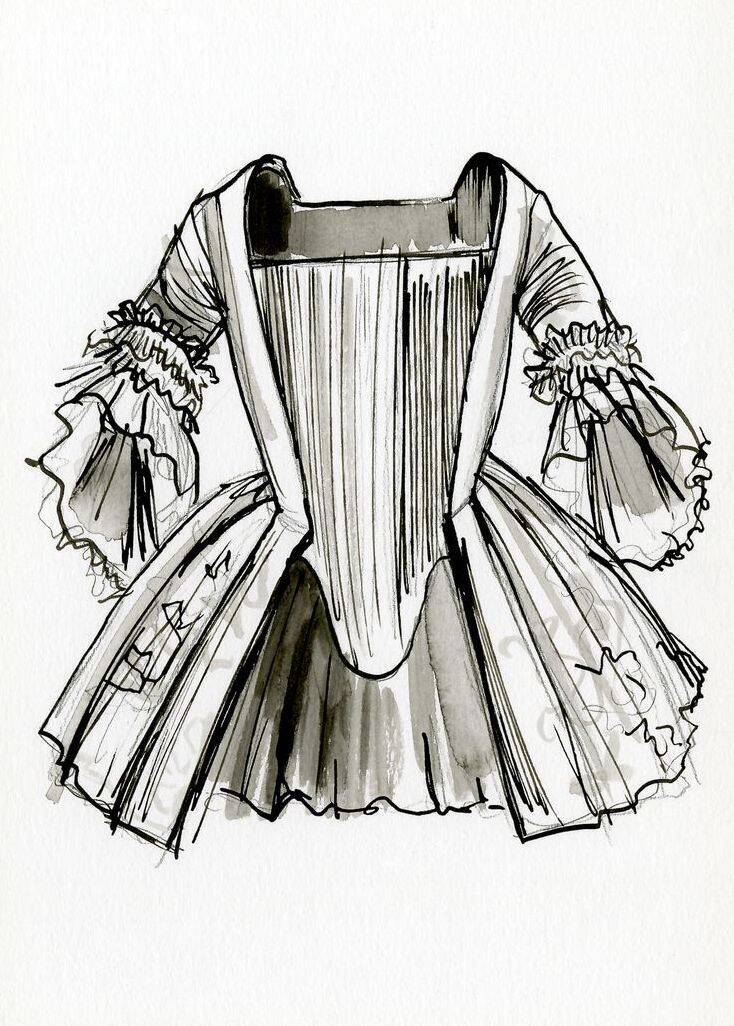
Drawing of a Caraco, by David Ring.
