= Palm Beach Pete =

American social media influencer (born 1955)

- Simel in 2026
- Born: Peter Bart Simel; February 14, 1955 (age 71)
- Education: Syracuse University
- Occupation: Social media influencer
- Years active: 2011; 2026–present
- Political party: Independent

Instagram information
- Page: Palm Beach Pete
- Years active: 2026–present
- Followers: 387 thousand

TikTok information
- Page: Palm Beach Pete
- Years active: 2026–present
- Followers: 1.2 million

YouTube information
- Channel: Palm Beach Pete
- Years active: 2026–present
- Subscribers: 11 thousand
- Palm Beach Pete's voice Recorded March 2026
- Last updated: October 7, 2026
- Website: voteforpalmbeachpete.com

Peter Bart Simel (/saɪˈmɛl/, sy-MEL; born February 14, 1955), nicknamed Palm Beach Pete, is an American social media influencer and political candidate. In 2026, he went viral online for his physical resemblance to Jeffrey Epstein.

== Life and career ==
Peter Simel is originally from New York. He is Jewish. He attended Syracuse University, from which he graduated in 1977. He worked in commercial real estate in New York City prior to retirement and played in the NCAA Division I men's tennis championships.

In 2011, Simel had an appearance in The Real Housewives of New York City season 4, where he attends a party and greets Sonja Morgan. He went viral due to his resemblance to the sex offender and financier Jeffrey Epstein, who was also a Jewish New Yorker that lived in Palm Beach, Florida.

Simel went viral again in March 2026 due to the resemblance. He has been referred to as Epstein's doppelgänger. A video posted to TikTok by another user showed Simel driving in a car on the I-95 in Florida, while the user says "Epstein is alive". The video garnered over 10 million views on TikTok, and had been posted during discussions surrounding the Epstein files.

Users on social media dubbed Simel as "Palm Beach Pete". The video fueled conspiracy theories relating to Epstein's death, which happened in August 2019. Following the virality, Simel created an Instagram account under the moniker and clarified that he was not Epstein. Simel has stated that he believes Epstein is dead and also called him "such a vile human being". On March 24, he appeared on Jimmy Kimmel Live! as himself.

== 2028 Palm Beach mayoral campaign ==
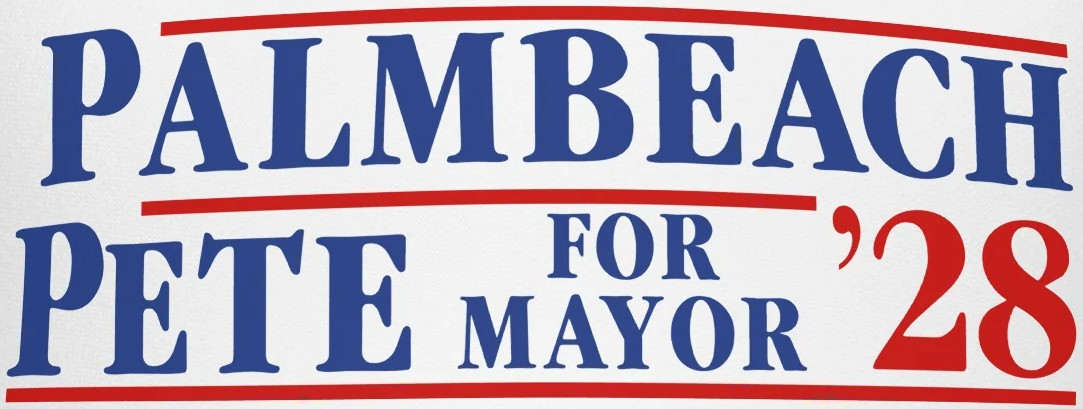
Simel's 2028 Mayoral Campaign logo, using his moniker

In May 2026, Simel announced his intentions to run for mayor of Palm Beach, Florida, in the 2028 elections. On a podcast, Simel stated that as mayor, he intends to fund expansion projects for pickleball and padel courts, offer free dog-walking, Botox, and "mother-in-law therapy", and lease residents a convertible vehicle for a year, free of cost. He also launched merchandise to support his campaign. Simel has stated that he is "not affiliated with any political party". On June 25, 2026, Simel went on The Alex Jones Show, hosted by Alex Jones, to discuss his 2028 mayoral campaign.

== See also ==
- Jeffrey Epstein and Internet memes
- Harvey Epstein
