= Bed jacket =

Type of garment

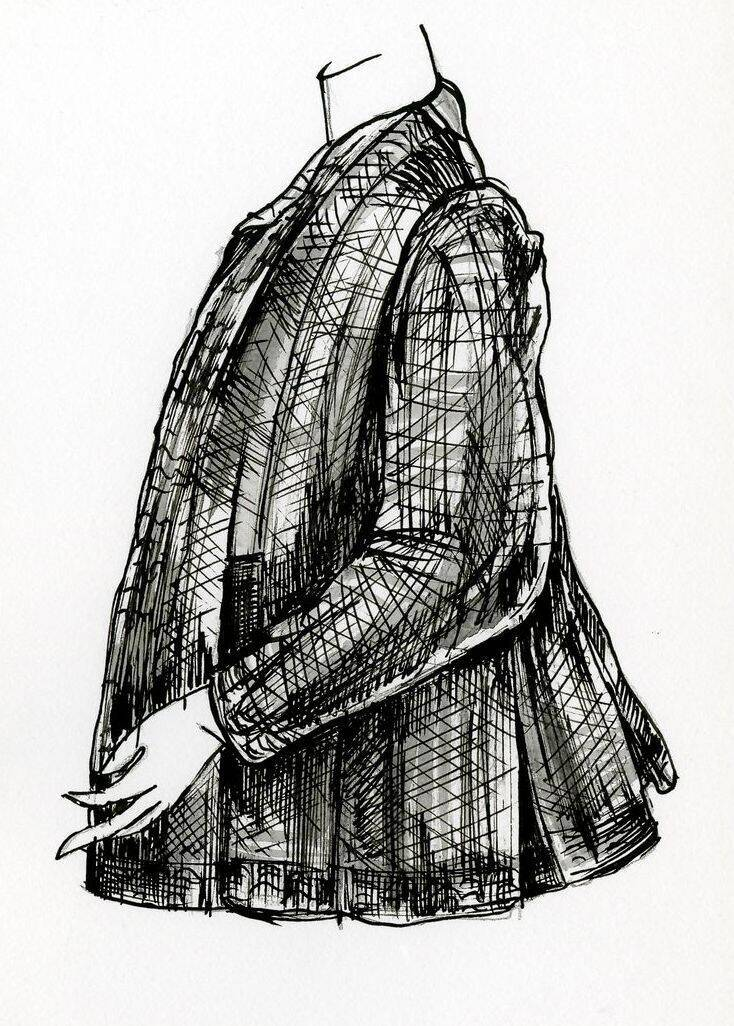
Sketch of a bed jacket

The bed jacket is a lightweight jacket worn to cover the chest, shoulders and arms while sitting up in bed. Its short length and cape-like cut allows for it to be put on (or removed) while reclining. Originating in the 17th century as a garment worn for warmth, bed jackets could be home-made, from practical materials such as knitted wool, flannel or cotton, or more expensive garments designed to exchange a measure functionality for elegance.

They were popularized in 1930s playboy films, featuring glamorous settings and female starlets lounging languorously in silken bedrooms. Such bed jackets were often made from sheer or lacy fabrics and displaying very feminine trimmings and details, considered an alluring item rather than used for warmth or modesty. Ostrich feather tips, swan’s down, pleated tulle and shirred lace were just a few examples of the extravagant materials that could be used in creating these confections.

Bed jackets over time

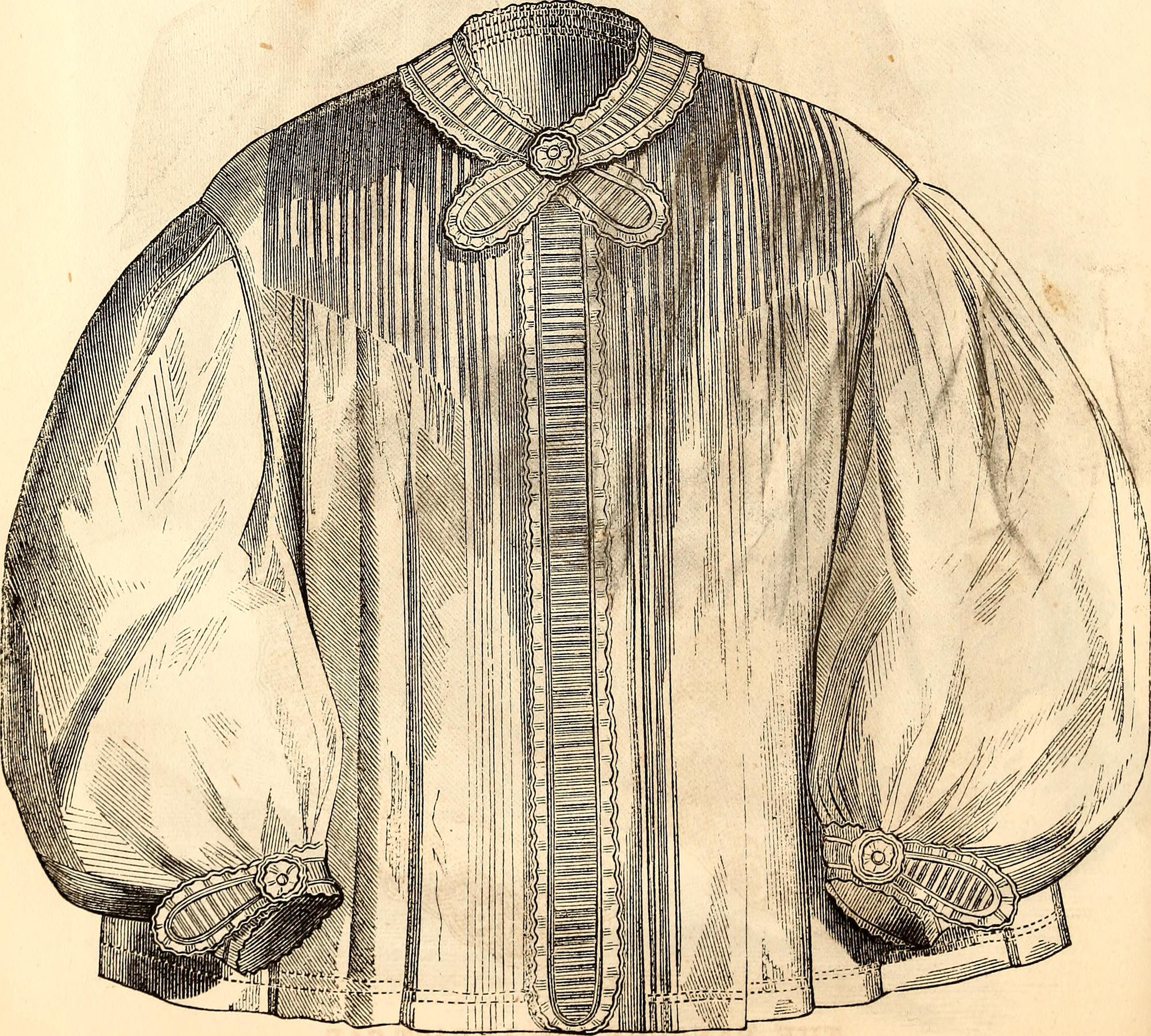
1840s drawing

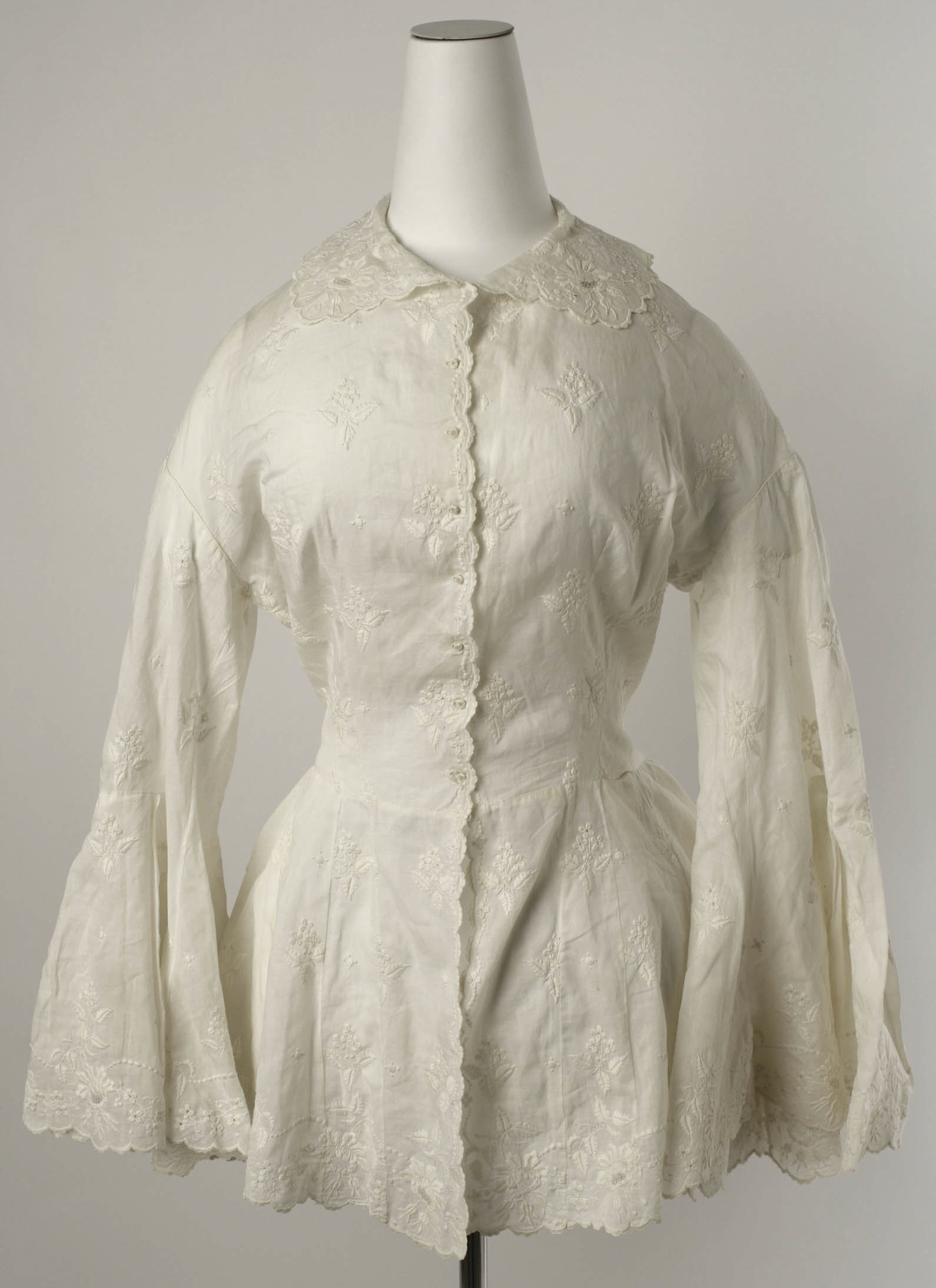
1870s cotton bed jacket

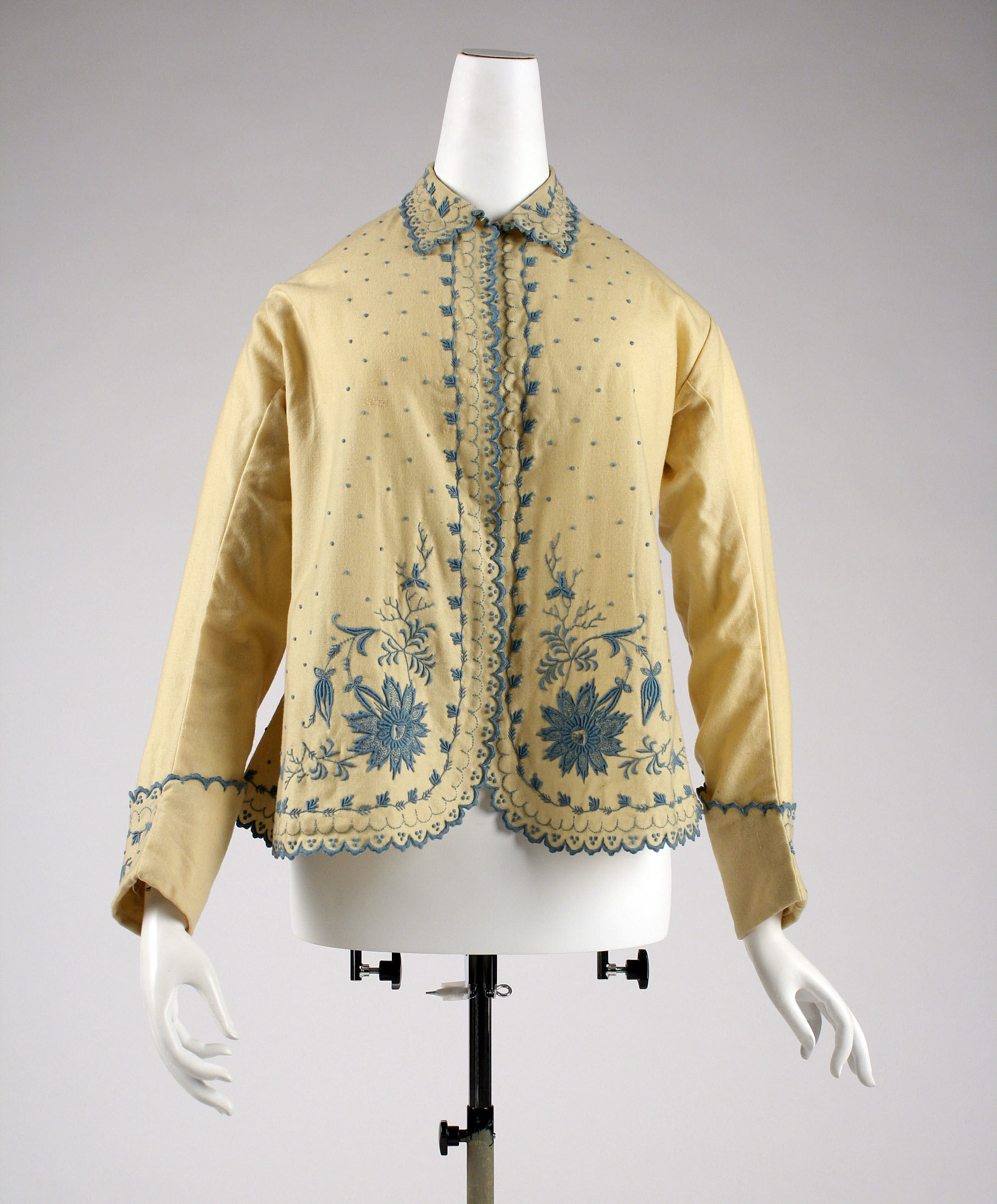
1880s wool bed jacket

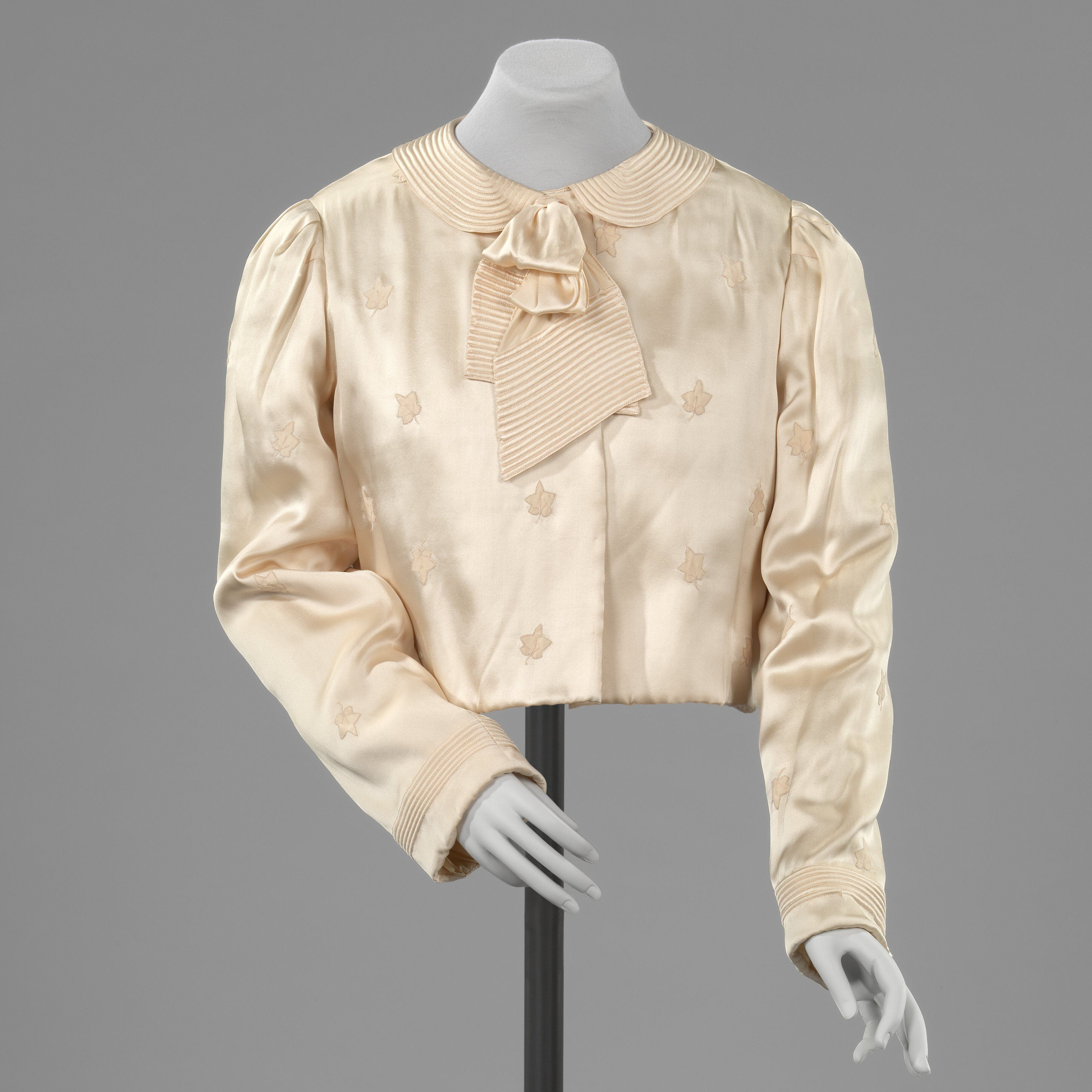
1930s silk bed jacket

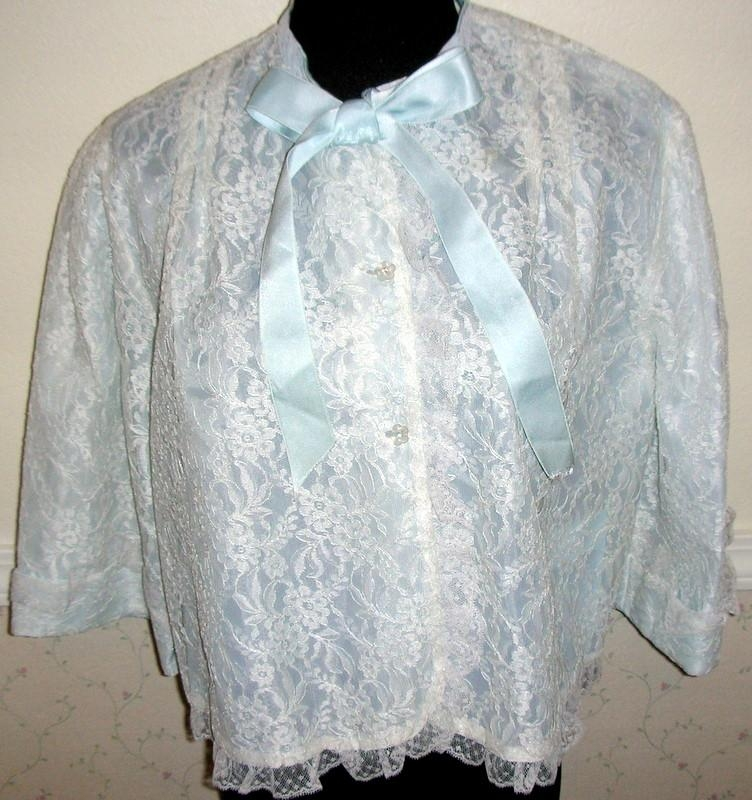
Modern lace bed jacket

== Related garments ==
- The Nightingale mantle, a type of shawl from the mid-19th century, later said to be named after the nurse Florence Nightingale
- Dressing gown
- Peignoir, a long, thin robe
- Sleeved blanket
