= Jeffrey Epstein and Internet memes =

AI-generated image featuring Jeffrey Epstein (front, left) Sean "Diddy" Combs (front, right) Charlie Kirk (back, left) and possibly Nicki Minaj (back, right) in a pool party setting.

Jeffrey Epstein has been the subject of several Internet memes and parodies, starting in 2019 with a resurgence in late 2025. These memes have been compared to jokes about the September 11 attacks, the Holocaust, and the Israeli-Palestinian conflict. They have also been criticized for "minimizing the suffering of victims."

== History ==
The earliest viral internet meme about Epstein was the phrase "Epstein didn't kill himself". It gained traction in September 2019 when users would insert the phrase as the end of comics and infographics. It was used as a non sequitur to suggest that Epstein was murdered by those who had engaged in sex offenses with him in order to avoid the information becoming public.

Between late 2025 and 2026, the Epstein files received massive amounts of attention on social media in the midst of controversy surrounding U.S. President Donald Trump's handling of said files that he had promised to release during his 2024 presidential campaign. This surge in attention led to users creating memes about Epstein and Little Saint James (popularly known as Epstein Island). These memes were often generated using artificial intelligence (AI) and expressed ironic support for him.

== Epstein files ==
During the release of the files, multiple parts were satirized by users, mainly due to unexpected mentions of popular internet phenomena, such as Five Nights at Freddy's, Fortnite and Tom Clancy's Rainbow Six Siege.

One of the most satirized parts of the files was an e-mail between Epstein and his brother, Mark Epstein, in which Mark told his brother to ask Steve Bannon if Vladimir Putin had the photos of "Trump blowing Bubba." Users suspected that the 'Bubba' referred to in the email was Bill Clinton, as he was the only other person in all of the emails referred to by that name. This aligned with the claim that he gained the nickname in 1992 in a reference to his "folksy manner." This led to a multitude of memes about the possibility that Trump had given oral sex to Clinton. In a statement to Newsweek, Mark claimed that "Bubba" was a "private individual who is not a public figure."

It was also revealed in the files that on May 4, 2017, Epstein emailed a futanari animation of characters from Five Nights at Freddy's to his girlfriend Karyna Shuliak via a 4chan link, with the subject line "Amazing Animations." The animation was reportedly made in Source Filmmaker and featured the characters Foxy and Toy Bonnie engaging in sexual activities. A writer for the website CafeMom called this "one of the unexpected connections that no one thought to look for."

Conspiracy theories that Epstein was still alive gained popularity due to a Fortnite account thought to be linked to him showing activity in 2023, 4 years after his death. The account was named littlestjeff1, which was the same username Epstein used on his YouTube channel. The theory was later refuted in a post by @FortniteStatus (an official Fortnite account on X), which stated that the account's owner had changed its username to littlestjeff1 after the username of Epstein's YouTube channel was revealed.

A TikTok account claimed that Epstein had operated a Minecraft YouTube channel under the username gunzablazin7378. This was due to an email from YouTube Support in the files showing a notification that the channel had received a reply to their comment on a Markiplier video. As of 2026, there has been no official confirmation that Epstein was the owner of the channel.

Due to Epstein's ethnicity and relations with some high-profile Israelis, Epstein memes are often Israel- or Jewish-themed. Epstein held a relationship with individuals such as former prime minister Ehud Barak, and had made donations to the Friends of the Israel Defense Forces. At the time of these revelations, there was an online TikTok trend involving the nicknaming of incumbent Israeli prime minister Benjamin Netanyahu to 'Big Yahu'. A wave of internet memes overlapping the two topics appeared, often using AI, associating Epstein with Israel, Netanyahu, or the Israel Defense Forces (IDF).

== AI memes ==
Many internet videos featuring Epstein made using generative-AI emerged. An image of Epstein wearing a navy blue quarter-zip was often deepfaked into dancing videos. AI-generated videos have shown him dancing at a rave, "looksmaxxing", and greeting Sean Combs (also known as Diddy) on a red carpet.

Some also made aesthetic outfit videos inspired by Epstein and said that critics of the memes were "mad they weren't invited to the island."

Another use of AI was in a trend on X in which people used it to edit themselves and others as friends of Epstein, including the use of built-in Grok chatbot. Some users deepfaked other people with Epstein as a form of criticism for the deepfaked person's associations with "sex pests and pedophiles." Unrelated face swaps were used in memes involving Charlie Kirk.

== Parody games ==
Multiple parody video games featuring Epstein have been released. One of the most popular games, Five Nights at Epstein's, was inspired by Five Nights at Freddy's. The game has the player trapped on Epstein Island, having to use mechanics such as diverting attention and manipulating environments to survive without being attacked by Epstein, Donald Trump, and Stephen Hawking. A viral controversy took place after teachers in Wake County found students playing the game. Another parody game named Epstein Clicker also released shortly after.

== Criticism ==
=== Desensitization of sex crimes ===
The Epstein meme phenomenon has been heavily criticized for "minimizing the suffering of victims who have experienced sexual or domestic violence." The memes have also been accused of "flattening trauma, crimes, and rape into content." This trend has led some to believe that these memes are a conspiratorial form of memetic warfare, more specifically that these memes are propagated by "groups with certain political interests" to desensitize or change the populace's perspective on the scandal. Controversial social media personality Andrew Tate tweeted a reflection on the Epstein memes, stating that, "the evil Epstein lived his life with near unlimited financial excess and luxury is now immortalised in internet culture forever."

=== Normalization of antisemitism ===
Links between Epstein and Israel displayed by the Epstein Files as well as Epstein's Jewish ethnicity led to memes emphasizing his identity, or included jokes, stereotypes or conspiracy theories about Jewish people in general. These memes often include Hebrew words such as goyim, a word used by Epstein derogatorily towards non-Jews in his emails.

== See also ==
- Palm Beach Pete
- Humor based on the September 11 attacks
