= Quarter-zipper =

Clothing style

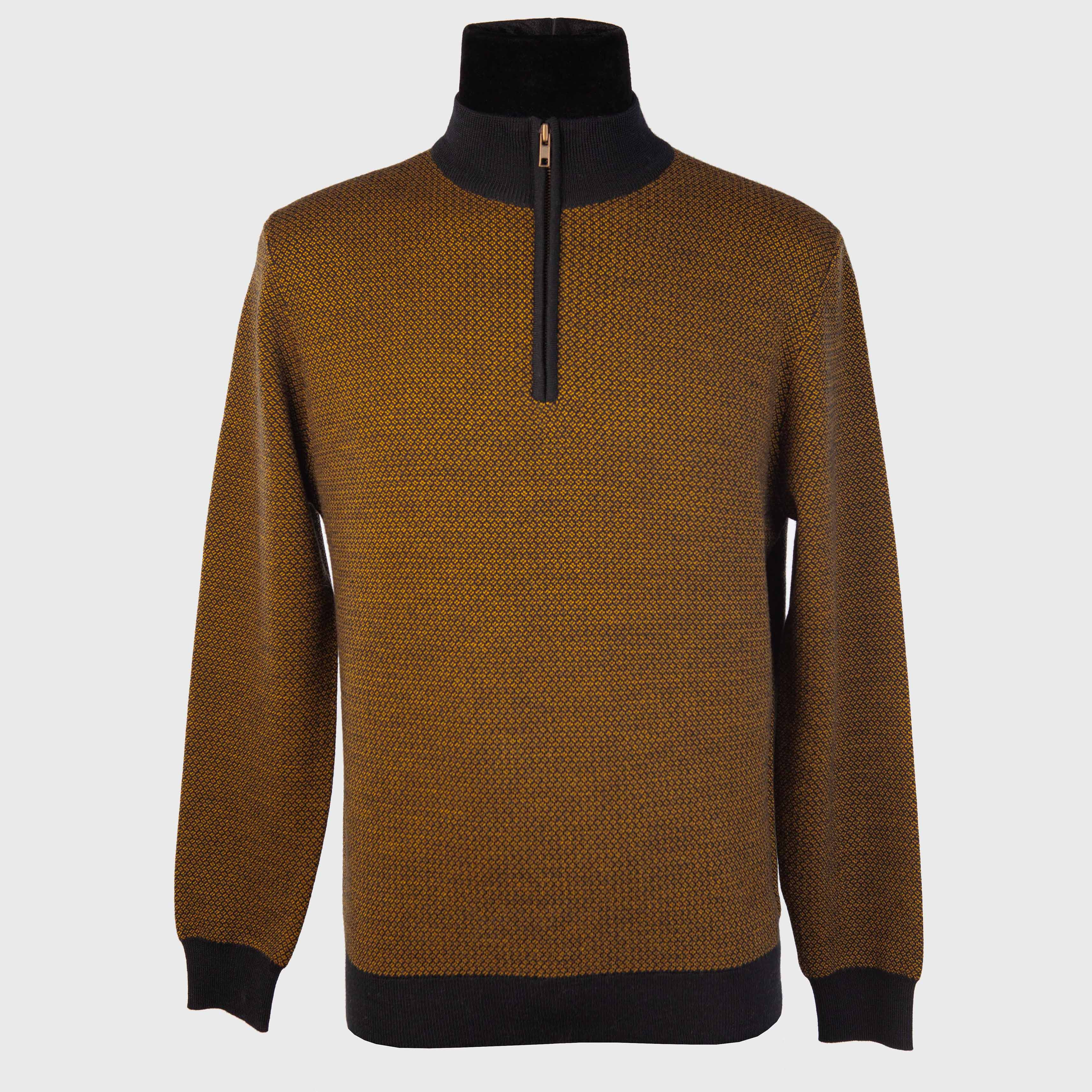

A quarter-zipper or quarter-zip is a type of sweater with a zipper that goes down from the neck to the chest (i.e., about a quarter of the garment's length).

The style originated as sportswear in the mid 20th century. The zipper allowed the collar to be opened as needed to regulate temperature. It was then used as leisurewear too.

In the 2020s, this style of garment is popular as smart casual wear. As dress codes are made more casual to accommodate trends, such as working from home, the quarter-zipper is increasingly worn as stylish work wear, replacing the traditional business suit.
