= Wamus =

Native American and pioneer jacket

A wamus is a type of jacket worn in the United States. The term is applied to several different types of upper-body garment.

== Early American history ==
One of the more consistent uses of wamus is to describe a fringed leather tunic that slips over the head. For early American pioneer families in the Southern United States, the buckskin (later, cloth) wamus was widely worn by young and pre-teen boys in the late 18th and very early 19th century. The wamus, if it opened down the front, was either laced shut or held closed with a belt, with dressier versions made from elk skin. If made from cloth, the wamus was dyed blue and trimmed with yellow fringe.

As worn by the Lakota people, the wamus was a ceremonial tunic which was coloured to represent the type of person the wearer was, as well as painted with mnemonic designs. Traditionally, if a warrior had scalped his enemy, he was allowed to trim his wamus with human hair cut from the heads of mourning women in addition to the cut fringe.

== Later history ==
The wamus eventually came to describe a sleeved jacket or cardigan, typically with buttoned wristbands and a belt-like waistband, in which format, it was also sometimes called a roundabout.

For Sunday best and other special occasions Amish men wear a jacket called a wamus, distinct from the 'mutze' traditionally worn for preaching.

== See also ==
- Zouave jacket
