= Banian =

Banian may refer to:

- Bania (caste), Indian mercantile caste
- Banian Hospital, veterinary hospitals in pre-modern India
- Banian, Khyber Pakhtunkhwa, Pakistan
- Banian, Guinea
- Banian, Iran (disambiguation)
- Banyan (clothing), 18th century loose gown or coat for men
- Banyan merchants, historical merchants from India
- Banyan tree
- Baniyan, an undershirt or vest, primarily an Indian expression in several languages; the traditional wear for fishermen

== See also ==
- Bania (disambiguation)
- Banyan (disambiguation)
