= Banyan (disambiguation) =

Banyan is a type of tree.

Banyan may also refer to:

- Banyan (album), 1997 debut album by Banyan
- Banyan (band), a musical group based in Los Angeles, California
- Banyan (clothing), a men's dressing gown or informal coat
- Banian, Guinea, alternative spelling
- Banyan, Iran (disambiguation), places in Iran
- Banyan merchants, an expression referring to Indian merchants used widely in many parts of India and countries in the Indian Ocean trade
- Banyan Productions, a Philadelphia-based television production company
- Banyan switch, a complex crossover switch in electronics
- Banyan Systems, the software company that created Banyan VINES
- Banyan tree in Lahaina, a notable tree in Hawaii
- Banyan VINES, a computer network operating system and accompanying protocols
- The Banyan, a social aid organization based in Chennai, India
- Typhoon Banyan, several tropical cyclones have been named Banyan
- Banyan Group, Singaporean multinational hospitality company

== See also ==
- Banian (disambiguation)
- Banya (disambiguation)
- Baniya (disambiguation)
- Bunyan (disambiguation)
