= Baniya =

Baniya or Bania may refer to:

- Bania (caste), also spelled Baniya, an Indian caste group
- Banias, a location in the Golan Heights, ancient Paneas
- Baniya (surname), a surname found among Nepali communities
- Baniyas, a town on the Syrian coast, ancient Balanea

== See also ==
- Baniyas (disambiguation)
- Bania (disambiguation)
- Banya (disambiguation)
- Banyan (disambiguation)
