= Banyun =

Banyun may refer to:

- Bainuk people, of Senegal
- Banyun, Iran (disambiguation)
