= Baniyas (disambiguation) =

Baniyas is a port city in Syria.

Baniyas or Banias may also refer to:

== Places ==
- Banias, the site of the ancient city of Caesarea Philippi, Golan Heights, Syria
  - Banias River, flowing from the Golan Heights to Israel
- Baniyas District, a local government district, Syria
- Baniyas, Abu Dhabi, a district of Abu Dhabi, United Arab Emirates

== Communities ==
- Bani Yas, a tribal confederation in the United Arab Emirates
- Banias, members of the Bania (caste), a community in India
- Banias, members of the Bania (Newar caste), a community in Nepal

== Other uses ==
- Ari Banias, American poet
- Baniyas Club, an Emirati sports club
- Banias (microprocessor), a Pentium M device

== See also ==
- Bania (disambiguation)
- Banya (disambiguation)
- Melkite Greek Catholic Archeparchy of Baniyas, a diocese in Lebanon
- Sir Bani Yas, an island, United Arab Emirates
  - Sir Bani Yas Airport
