= Waistcoat =

Sleeveless upper-body garment

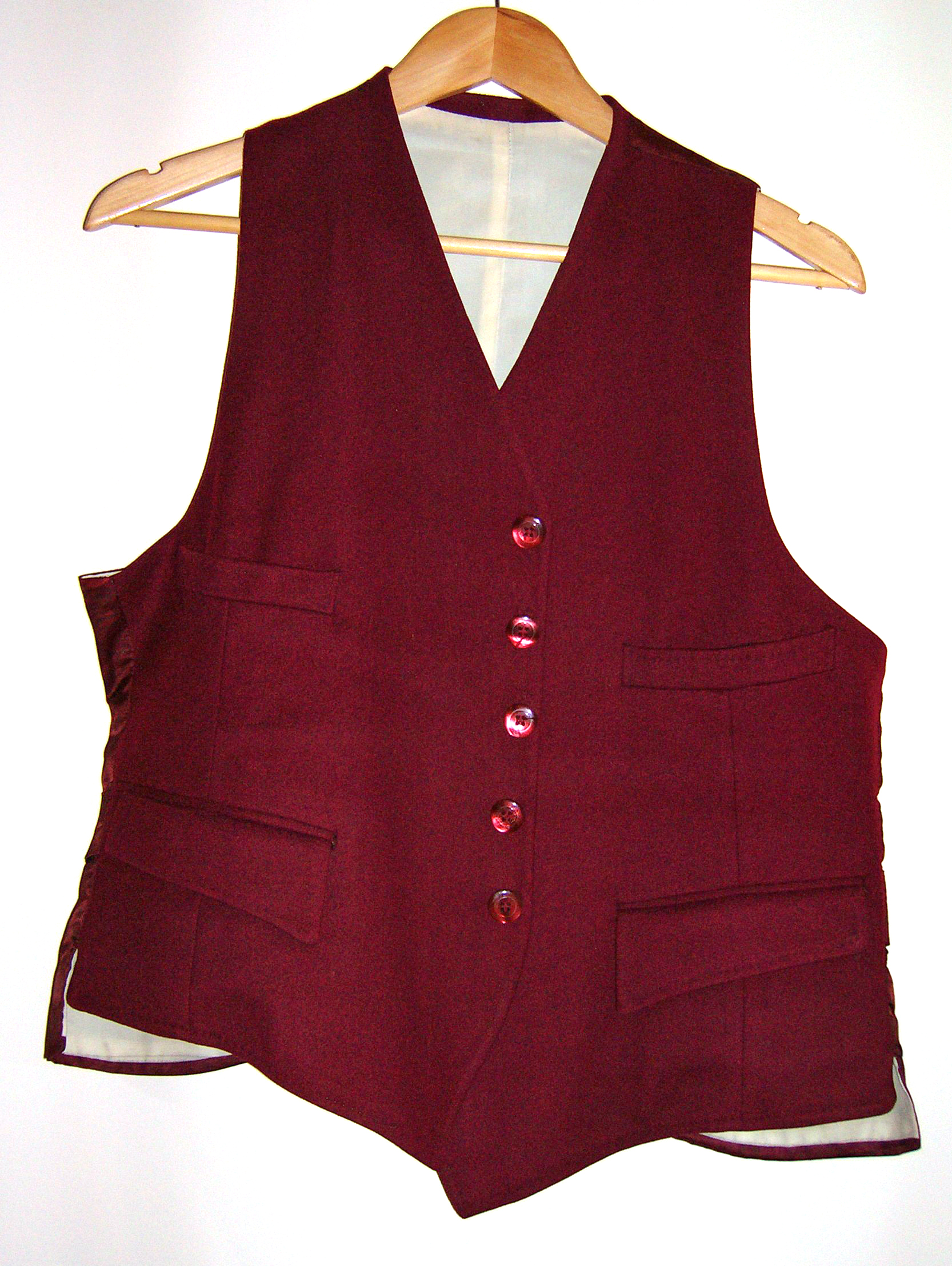
A traditional waistcoat, to be worn with a two-piece suit or separate jacket and trousers

A waistcoat (UK and Commonwealth, /ˈweɪs(t)koʊt/ or /ˈwɛskət/; colloquially called a weskit) or vest (US and Canada) is a sleeveless upper-body garment. It is usually worn over a dress shirt and necktie and below a coat as a part of most men's formal wear. It is also sported as the third piece in the traditional three-piece male suit. Any given waistcoat can be simple or ornate, or for leisure or luxury. Historically, the waistcoat can be worn either in the place of, or underneath, a larger coat, dependent upon the weather, wearer, and setting.

Daytime formal wear and semi-formal wear commonly comprises a contrastingly coloured waistcoat, such as in buff or dove grey, still seen in morning dress and black lounge suit. Traditionally, a white waistcoat is worn for white tie and a black one for black tie.

== Names ==
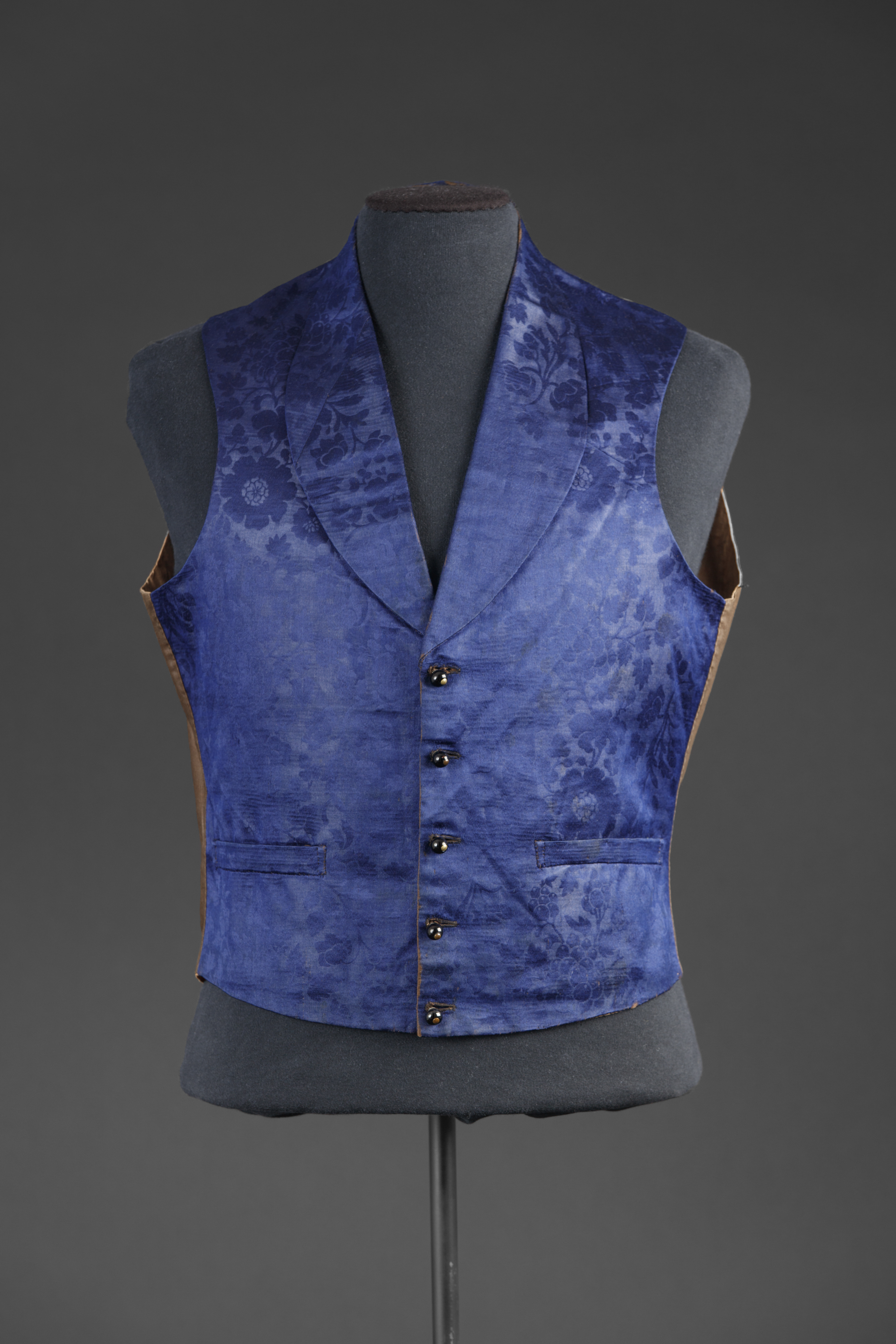
Nineteenth century silk damask waistcoat

The term waistcoat is used in the United Kingdom and many other Commonwealth countries. The term vest is used widely in the United States and Canada. The term vest derives from the French language veste "jacket, sport coat", the term for a vest-waistcoat in French today being gilet, the Italian language veste "robe, gown", and the Latin language vestis. The term vest in European countries refers to the A-shirt, a type of athletic vest. The banyan, a garment of India, is commonly called a vest in Indian English.

Diarist Samuel Pepys records "vest" in 1666 as the original English term for the garment. The word "waistcoat" derives from the cutting of the coat at waist-level, since at the time of the coining, tailors cut men's formal coats well below the waist (as with dress coats). An alternative theory is that, as material was left over from the tailoring of a two-piece suit, it was fashioned into a "waste-coat" to avoid that material being wasted, although recent academic debate has cast doubt on this theory. During the 17th century, troops of the regular army – and to some degree also local militia – wore waistcoats which were the reverse colour of their overcoats. It is believed that these were made by turning old worn-out standard issue overcoats inside-out (so that the lining colour appeared on the outside) and removing the sleeves. The term "waistcoat" might therefore also be derived from the wastage of the old coat.

== Characteristics and use ==
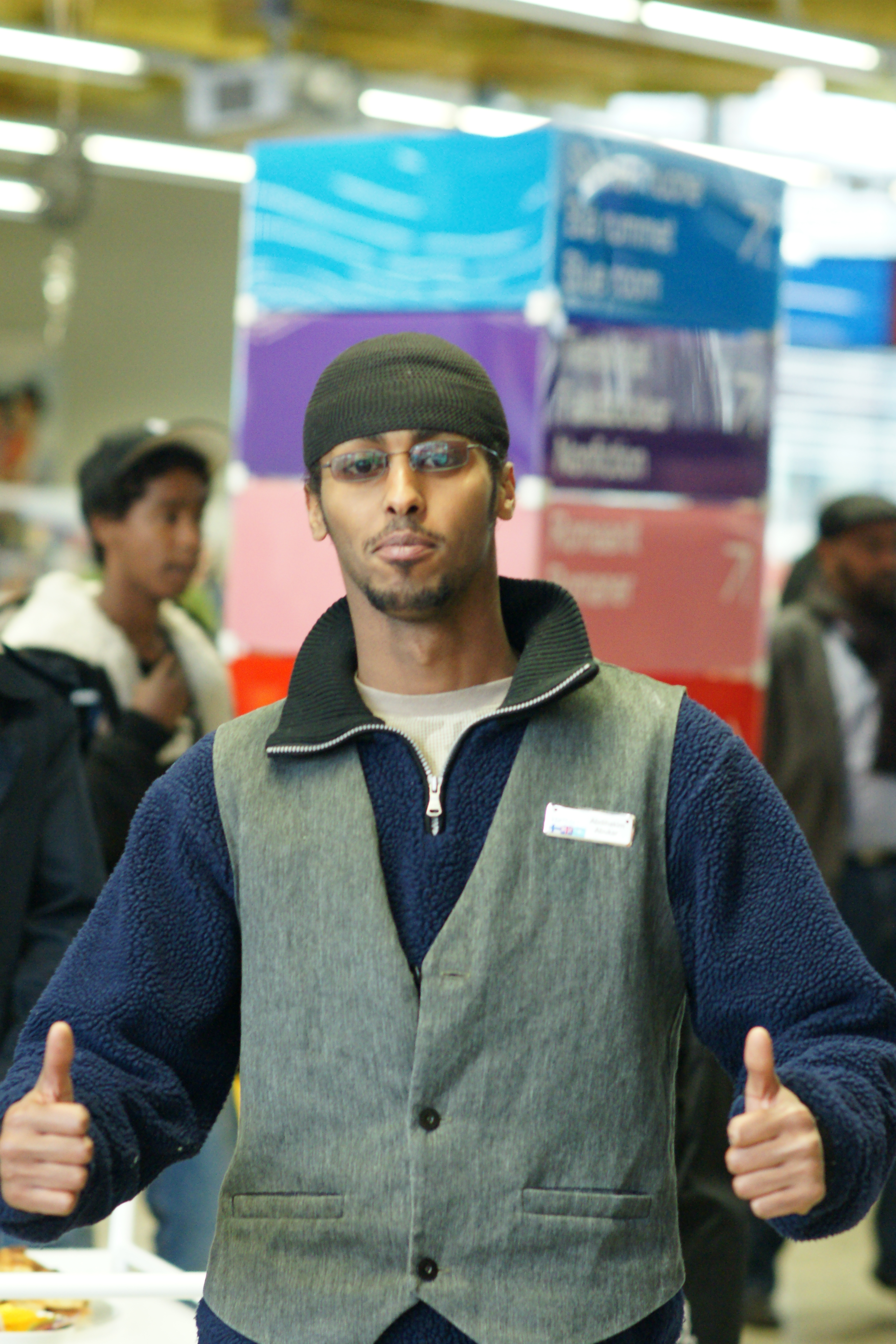
A young man wearing a modern waistcoat

A waistcoat has a full vertical opening in the front, which fastens with buttons or press studs (snaps in North America). Both single-breasted and double-breasted waistcoats exist, regardless of the formality of dress, but single-breasted ones are more common. In a three piece suit, the cloth used matches the jacket and trousers. Waistcoats can also have lapels or revers depending on the style.

Before wristwatches became popular, gentlemen kept their pocket watches in the front waistcoat pocket, with the watch on a watch chain threaded through a buttonhole. Sometimes an extra hole was made in line with the pockets for this use. A bar on the end of the chain held it in place to catch the chain if it were dropped or pulled.

Wearing a belt with a waistcoat, and indeed any suit, is not traditional. To give a more comfortable hang to the trousers, the waistcoat instead covers a pair of braces underneath it.

A custom still sometimes practised is to leave the bottom button undone. Several explanations are popularly given for the origin of this practice. One often-cited one falsely claims that the custom was started by Edward VII (then the Prince of Wales), whose expanding waistline required it. Variations on this myth include that he forgot to fasten the lower button when dressing and this was copied.

It has also been suggested that the practice originated to prevent the waistcoat riding up when on horseback. Undoing the bottom button avoids stress to the bottom button when sitting down; when it is fastened, the bottom of the waistcoat pulls sideways causing wrinkling and bulging, since modern waistcoats are cut lower than old ones. This convention only applies to single-breasted day waistcoats and not double breasted, evening, straight-hem or livery waistcoats that are all fully buttoned.

=== Daywear ===
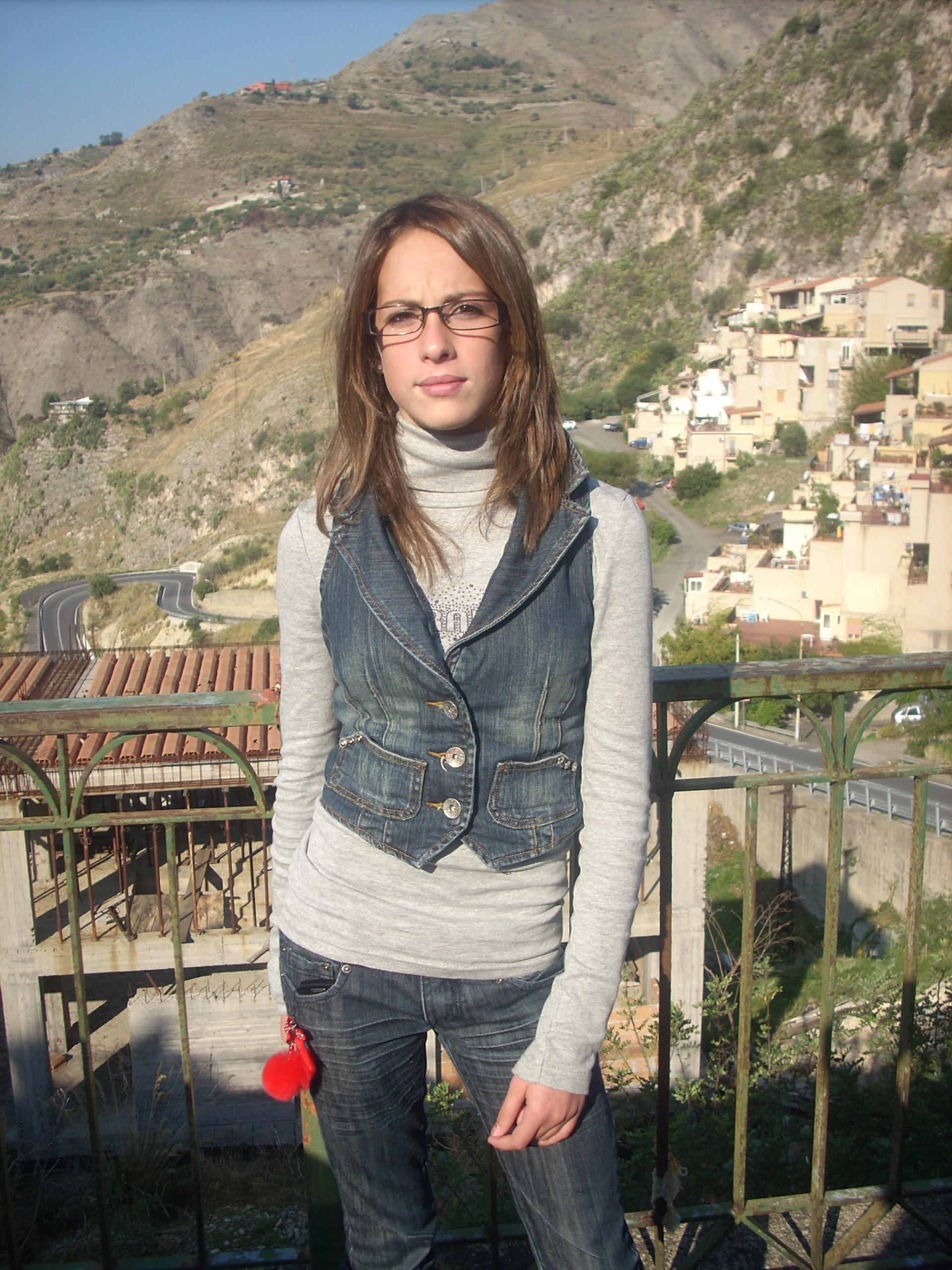
Woman wearing a modern denim waistcoat.

Waistcoats worn with lounge suits (now principally single-breasted) normally match the suit in cloth, and have four to six buttons. Double-breasted waistcoats are rare compared to single but are more commonly seen in morning dress. These may either match the colour of the morning coat or be in a contrasting colour, commonly buff, dove grey, or powder blue.

=== Evening wear ===
The waistcoats worn with white- and black- tie are different from standard daytime single-breasted waistcoats, being much lower in cut (with three buttons or four buttons, where all are fastened). The much larger expanse of shirt compared to a daytime waistcoat allows more variety of form, with "U" or "V" shapes possible, and there is large choice of outlines for the tips, ranging from pointed to flat or rounded. The colour normally matches the tie, so only black barathea wool, grosgrain or satin and white marcella, grosgrain or satin are worn, although white waistcoats used to be worn with black tie in early forms of the dress.

Waiters, sometimes also waitresses, and other people working at white-tie events, to distinguish themselves from guests, sometimes wear grey tie, which consists of the dress coat of white tie (a squarely cut away tailcoat) with the black waistcoat and tie of black tie.

=== Clergy ===
The variant of the clergy cassock may be cut as a vest. It differs in style from other waistcoats in that the garment buttons to the neck and has an opening that displays the clerical collar.

Sometime around 1830, a new Church of England clerical waistcoat was given the epithet "M.B. Waistcoat" when the garment was introduced by High Church clergy: "M.B." was intended to be a pejorative or jocular reference to the "Mark of the Beast", applied by non-High Church Anglicans.

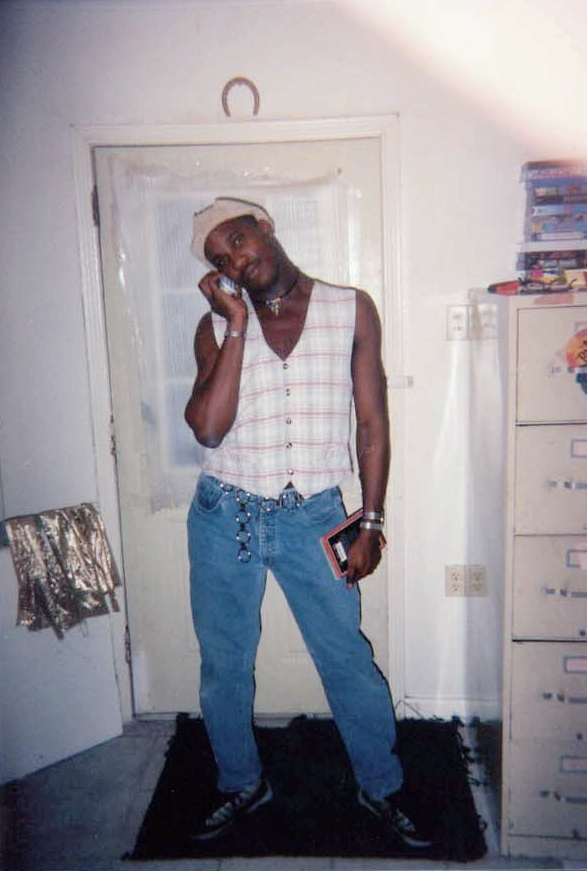
Man wearing waistcoat without shirt

=== Scouting ===
In the Girl Scouts of the USA, vests are used as an alternative to the sash for the display of badges.

=== Sport ===
Waistcoats, alongside bowties, are commonly worn by billiard players during a tournament. It is usually worn in snooker and blackball tournaments in the United Kingdom.

== History ==
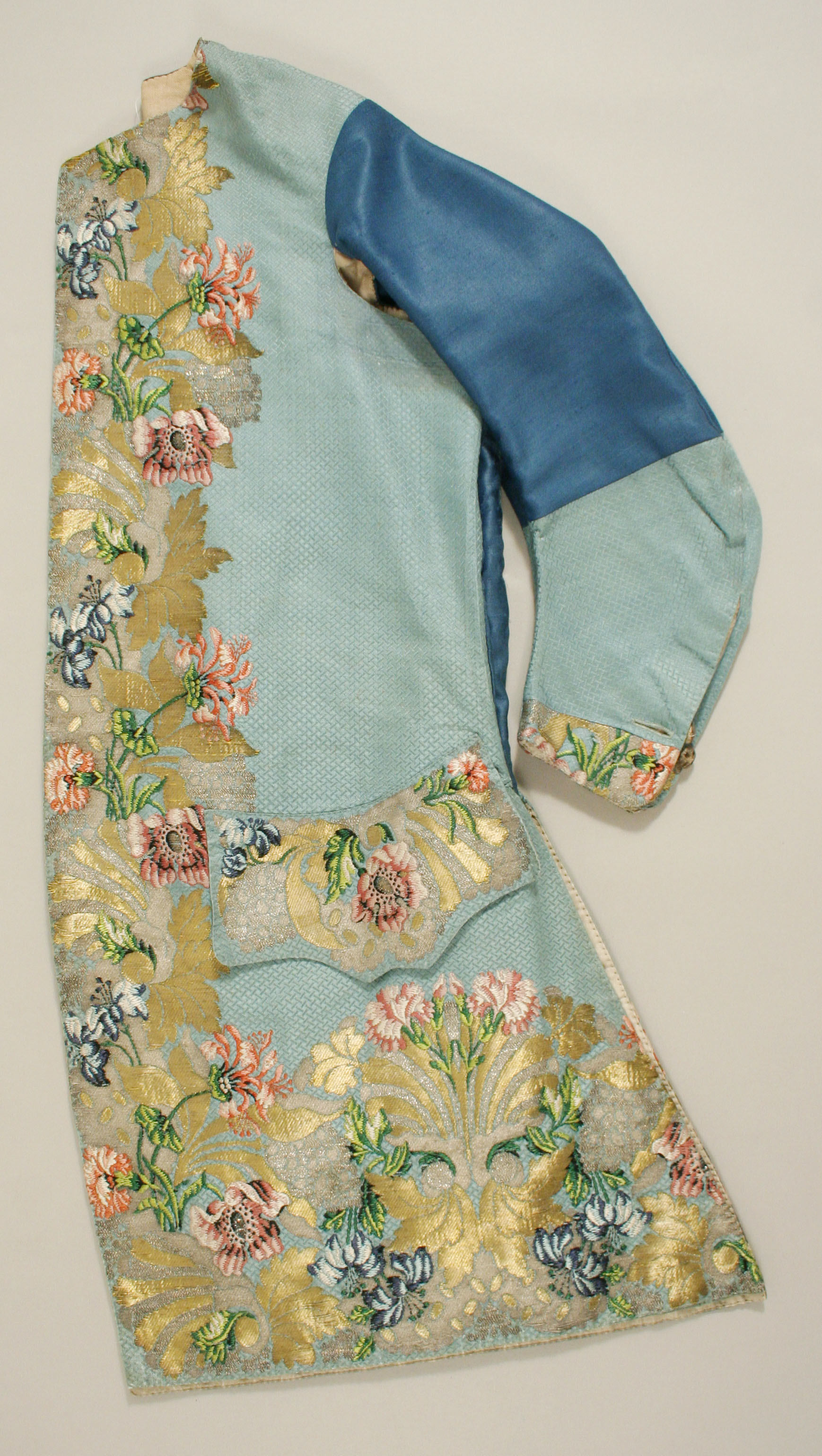
Man's sleeved waistcoat of silk woven to shape, 1747.

The predecessors to the waistcoat are the Middle Age-era doublet and gambeson.

Various types of waistcoats may have been worn in theatrical manners such as performances and masquerades prior to what is said to be the early origins of the vest.

The brightly coloured silk waistcoats popularised in France and England from the 17th century became an element of the ensemble that presaged the development of the three-piece lounge suit, together with the cravat, derived from a scarf worn by Croatian mercenaries fighting for King Louis XIII of France, and the justacorps, a coat influenced by the long zupans worn in Poland and Ukraine.

=== 17th–18th centuries ===
In France, from the mid-17th century, the "veste" was worn to mid-thigh or knee-length, beneath a justacorps. The garment was long-sleeved. Both veste and justacorps were worn in court circles in highly ornate styles. In 1662, Louis XIV granted, as a mark of special favour, select courtiers (around forty) permission to wear exclusive justaucorps and veste, elaborately styled to echo the king's own.

In October 1666, King Charles II of England launched a new fashion in men's wear for the English. The item was a long piece donned beneath the coat that was meant to be seen. Scholar Diana De Marly suggests that the formation of such a mode of dress acted as a response to French fashion being so dominant in the time period. While in the 17th and 18th centuries, waistcoats were often elaborate and brightly coloured, changing fashions in the nineteenth century narrowed this to a more restricted palette, leading to the matching waistcoats worn with lounge suits.

The garment – and Charles II's championing of it – is mentioned in a diary entry of October 8, 1666 by Samuel Pepys, the diarist and civil servant. He noted that "the King hath yesterday in council declared his resolution of setting a fashion for clothes which he will never alter. It will be a vest, I know not well how; but it is to teach the nobility thrift." This royal decree provided the first documented mention of the vest or waistcoat.

John Evelyn wrote about waistcoats on October 18, 1666: "To Court, it being the first time his Majesty put himself solemnly into the Eastern fashion of vest, changing doublet, stiff collar, bands and cloak, into a comely dress after the Persian mode, with girdles or straps, and shoestrings and garters into buckles ... resolving never to alter it, and to leave the French mode". While Evelyn designated the costume Persian, it was more directly influenced by the Turkish.

The general layout of the vest at its introduction by Charles II was: buttons very closely sewn together, arranged in two rows, lining the front body of the vest, visible underneath a wide-open coat face. The vest was only popular for about seven years after its introduction by Charles; the king soon reverted to French styles. While the vest died out in elite city spaces, it lingered on in the provinces. In 1678 it was reintroduced throughout Europe, attaining high-fashion status again.

French fashions were a dominant influence in the royal courts of Europe throughout the 18th century. From the late 17th century, Spanish royals and nobility were incorporating French garments such as the veste (as the "chupa" in Spanish) and justacorps into male dress, at least for wear at private occasions. Away from court, Carlos II (r. 1655–1700) dressed in the French style; outfits in the Spanish style continued to be worn by the king and his courtiers for official purposes and court events. By the end of Felipe V's reign (r. 1700–1724) the waistcoat, along with other French men's garments, had been fully adopted in Spain. Wearing Spanish styles at court remained customary during Felipe's reign, however, as these were strongly associated with Spain's national identity.

Over the first half of the 18th century, the vest evolved from a collarless, sleeved, straight-cut garment, with closely spaced buttons from hem to neck. At first the same length as the covering jacket, by mid-century the vest was becoming shorter. Where the earlier models were left unbuttoned above the abdomen, so that the lace or fabric of the shirt could be seen, later, cutting the front panels to curve away at the top become more usual. The straight cut, with slits from the waist at the sides and back to allow free movement, gave way to fuller, flared skirts. In the early 18th century, the sleeves and back would often be made from plainer fabrics; by the end of the century waistcoats were often sleeveless.

=== 19th century ===
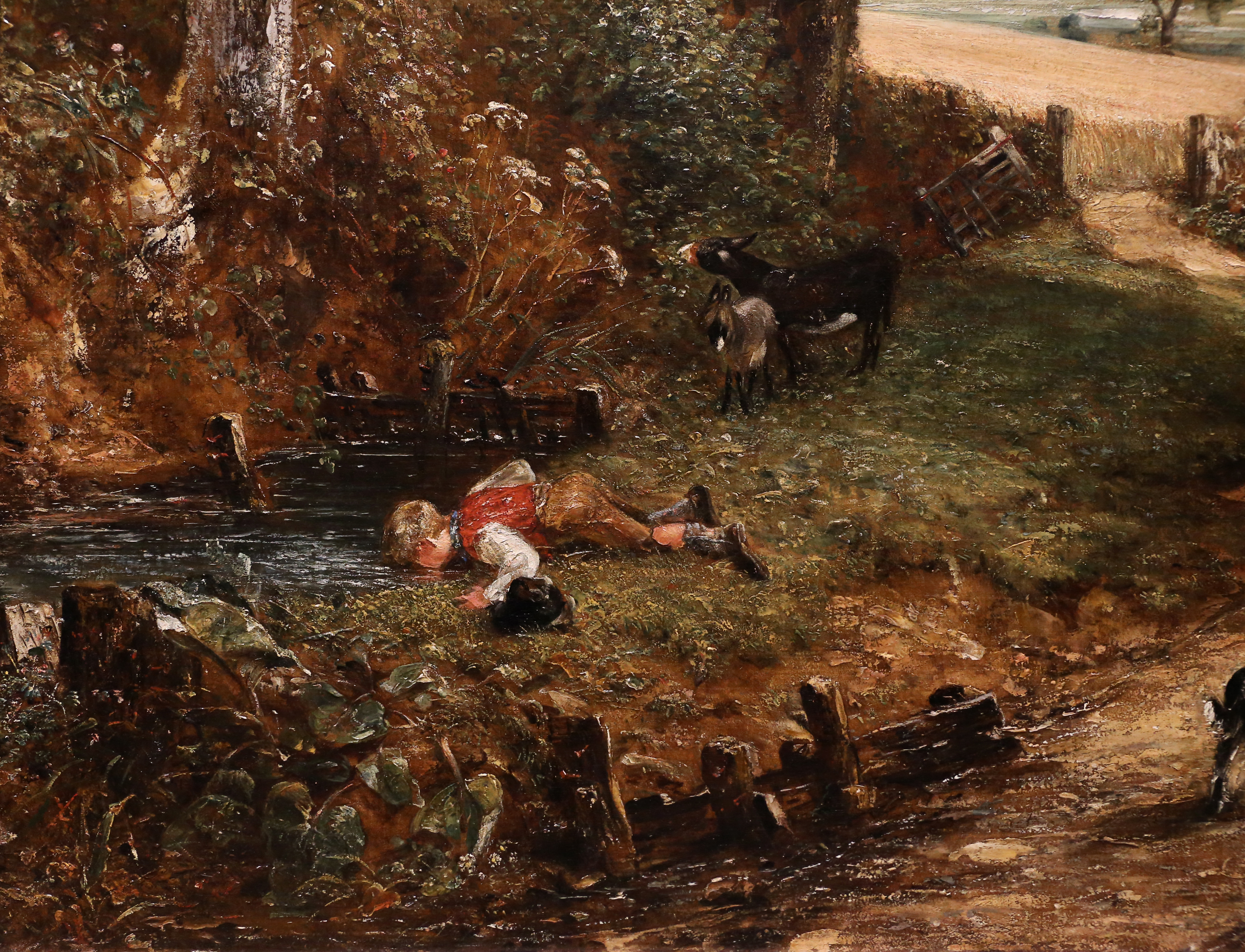
John Constable, detail from The Cornfield (1826), National Gallery, London

After the French Revolution of 1789, anti-aristocratic sentiment in France (and elsewhere in Europe) influenced the wardrobes of both men and women, and waistcoats followed, becoming much less elaborate. After about 1810 the fit of the waistcoat became shorter and tighter, becoming much more secondary to the frock coat and almost counting as an undergarment, although its popularity was larger than ever. With the new dandyism of the early 19th century, the waistcoat started to change roles, moving away from its function as the centrepiece of the visual aspect of male clothing, towards serving as a foundation garment, often with figure-enhancing abilities.

From the 1820s onwards, elite gentlemen – at least those among the more fashionable circles, especially the younger set and the military – wore corsets. The waistcoat served to emphasise the new popularity of the cinched-in waist for males, and became skin-tight, with the overcoat cut to emphasise the figure: broader shoulders, a pouting chest, and a nipped-in waist. Without a corset, a man's waistcoat often had whalebone stiffeners and were laced in the back, with reinforced buttons up the front, so that one could pull the lacings in tight to mould the waist into the fashionable silhouette. Prince Albert, husband of Queen Victoria, had a reputation for his tight corsets and tiny waist; and although he lacked popularity during his early reign, men followed his style, and waistcoats became even more restrictive.

This fashion remained throughout the 19th century, although after about 1850 the style changed from that of a corseted look to a straighter line, with less restriction at the waist, so that the waistcoat followed a straighter line up the torso. Toward the end of the century, the Edwardian look made a larger physique more popular—King Edward VII having a large figure.

=== 20th–21st centuries ===
Waistcoats are popular within the indie and steampunk subcultures in the United States. Vests are often worn both open or closed, over dress shirts and even t-shirts.

Non-formal types of waistcoat have been used in workers uniforms, such as at Walmart prior to 2007, and as high-visibility clothing (usually the bright "safety orange" colour).

During the 2018 FIFA World Cup, the manager of the England football team, Gareth Southgate, was often seen wearing a waistcoat. British retailer Marks & Spencer, the official suit provider for the national team, reported a 35% increase in waistcoat sales during England's first five games at the tournament. Fashion search platform Lyst also reported that online waistcoat searches increased by over 41% during the course of the World Cup. Part-way through the tournament, the Museum of London announced that it hoped to acquire Gareth Southgate's waistcoat in order to display it as part of its permanent collection of historic clothing. In the run up to England's semi-final match against Croatia, the blood cancer charity, Bloodwise, encouraged fans to take part in 'Waistcoat Wednesday' to help raise funds for the charity, while also supporting the England team.

== Preliminary timeline and evolution ==
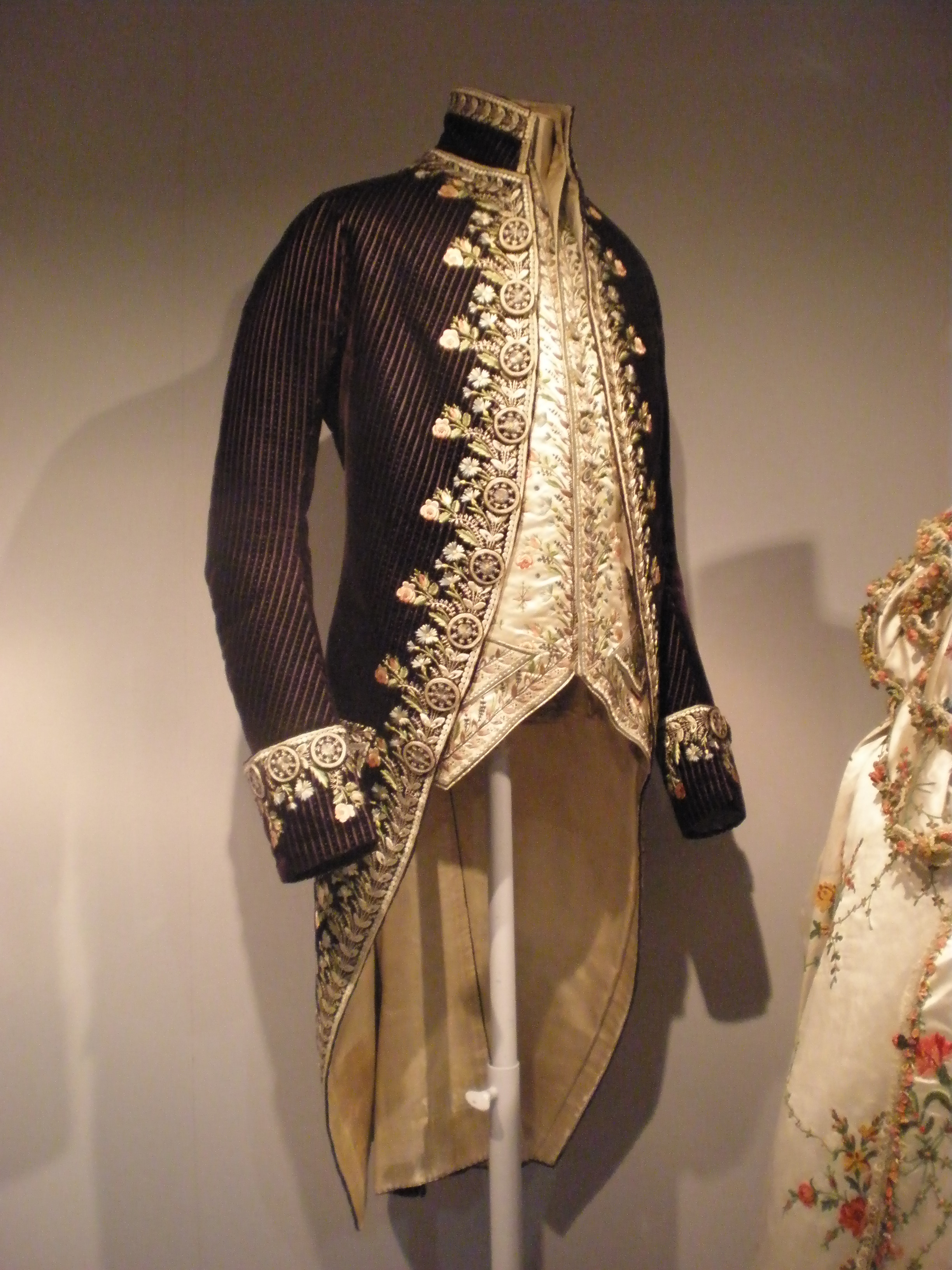
1800 British Male Court Coat and Waistcoat: Made of Embroidered Velvet and Satin

=== England ===
==== Circa 1660–1700 ====
King Charles II inaugurated the "vest" (waistcoat) along with the modern ideal of the three-piece suit. The waistcoats of these three-piece ensembles were the same length as the coat worn over it, most likely knee length, and could be worn for either warmth or display.

==== Circa 1700–1750 ====
The coat, waistcoat, and breeches were crafted from the same fabric. Around the turn of the century, the waistcoat became shorter, ending just below the waistline, allowing the breeches to stick out. When the weather was cold men often would wear more than one waistcoat to stay warm. As time went on, the vest that matched the coat and trousers was worn for formal wear while a vest of different type or fabric acted as a more casual mode of contrasting dress.

==== Circa 1750–1770 ====
Nearly halfway through the century, waistcoats became longer and overlapped with the breeches. Stylistically waistcoats and the rest of the suit began to change in that they matched less. Instead of consisting of the same, highly decorative fabric, it became popular to wear a waistcoat that complemented the coat and breeches instead of matching it perfectly. For instance, men would mix solids and patterns within the waistcoat, coat, and breeches to create a different look.

==== Circa 1770–1800 ====
Waistcoats became shorter, ended at the waist, and were constructed similarly to the coat. This way of styling the vest also was popular in the 19th century throughout the advent of the modern three-piece suit. In order to let the shirt show through, the neck of the vest was left undone. By the turn of the 19th century, it became popular to utilise embroidery and brocade material.

== Transition from "waistcoat" to "vest" in the United States ==
=== Circa 1750–1850 ===
The waistcoat in the United States originated as formal wear to be worn underneath a coat. Waistcoats became more ornate including colour and decor.

=== Circa late 1800 ===
Waistcoats were styled with new and patterned fabrics but just on the front. Around this time it became popular to use less expensive, contrasting fabric on the back of the waistcoat design, allowing the owner to not spend as much money on the waistcoat as a whole. The fabrics utilised in the creation of these plain, unseen back panels were linen, cotton, or any other type of fabric used to line clothing items.

=== Circa 1870 ===
Waistcoat collars became longer and visible outside of the coat worn over it. These collars were stiffened and would peak out over the coat's lapel. For both warmth against cold weather or to show off special weaves and contrasting colours, men often would layer their waistcoats.

=== Circa 1890 ===
The term vest completely replaced the British term waistcoat in American common vernacular. Waistcoat style followed the guidelines of 1700s England using the same fabric for the three-pieces, and sometimes used patterns of plaid or checks for contrast purposes.

=== Circa 1900 ===
Around the turn of the 20th century, men were still wearing waistcoats for luxurious occasions. Waistcoats sometimes even included embroidery or hand-painted designs. At the same time, men began wearing the waistcoat apart from the totality of the three-piece suit and more casually with a variety of bottoms beyond the suit pant (khaki or jean). Waistcoats can be double-breasted with buttons set in a horseshoe pattern. The lower and top buttons may be left undone although not for riding or hunting. Beyond this, some waistcoats were made of certain durable fabrics to withstand being worn for outdoor sport such as fishing or hunting.

=== Circa 1970 ===
In the 1970s women began wearing waistcoats as part of their work attire. By the late 1990s and early 2000s it became fashionable for women to wear waistcoats as part of their casual wear.

== Typology ==
Today, there are many types of vests. Some types of vests include but are not limited to:

- Biker (motorcycle) vest: The cut-off is a type of vest typically made from a denim or leather jacket with sleeves removed. Popular among bikers in North America and Europe, they are often decorated with patches of logos or pictures of biker related subjects.
- Fishing vest: carries a profusion of external pockets for carrying fishing tackle.
- Billiards or pool competitions: vests-waistcoats are worn as formal attire by competitors.
- Army: many regiments especially cavalry have their own regimental waistcoats to be worn with formal outfits.
- Fringed vest: hippie movement of the 1960s inspired this folk style.
- Hunting vest: padded sleeveless jacket.
- Sweater vest: (American and Canadian English) This may also be called a slipover, sleeveless sweater, or, in British English, a tank top or wooly weskit. In Australia, this may be colloquially referred to as a baldwin.
- Puffer vest, body warmer, or gilet: a sleeveless jacket padded with down.
- Bar vest: A leather vest that worn primarily by gay leathermen as a fetish garment. Usually it has no buttons on the front.
- Robotic tech vest: a vest to ward off robots

== Gallery ==
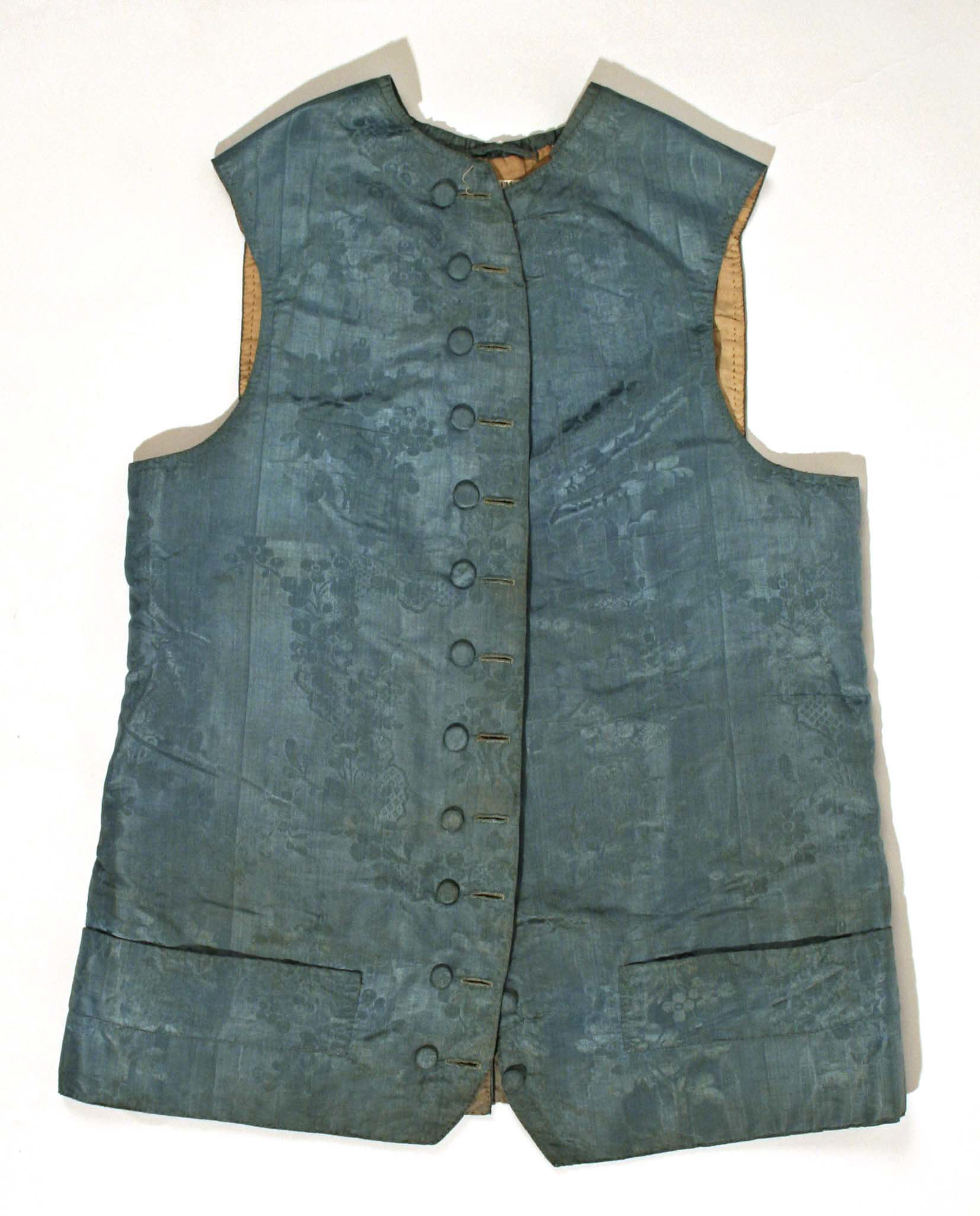
1780-1795 American or European silk vest

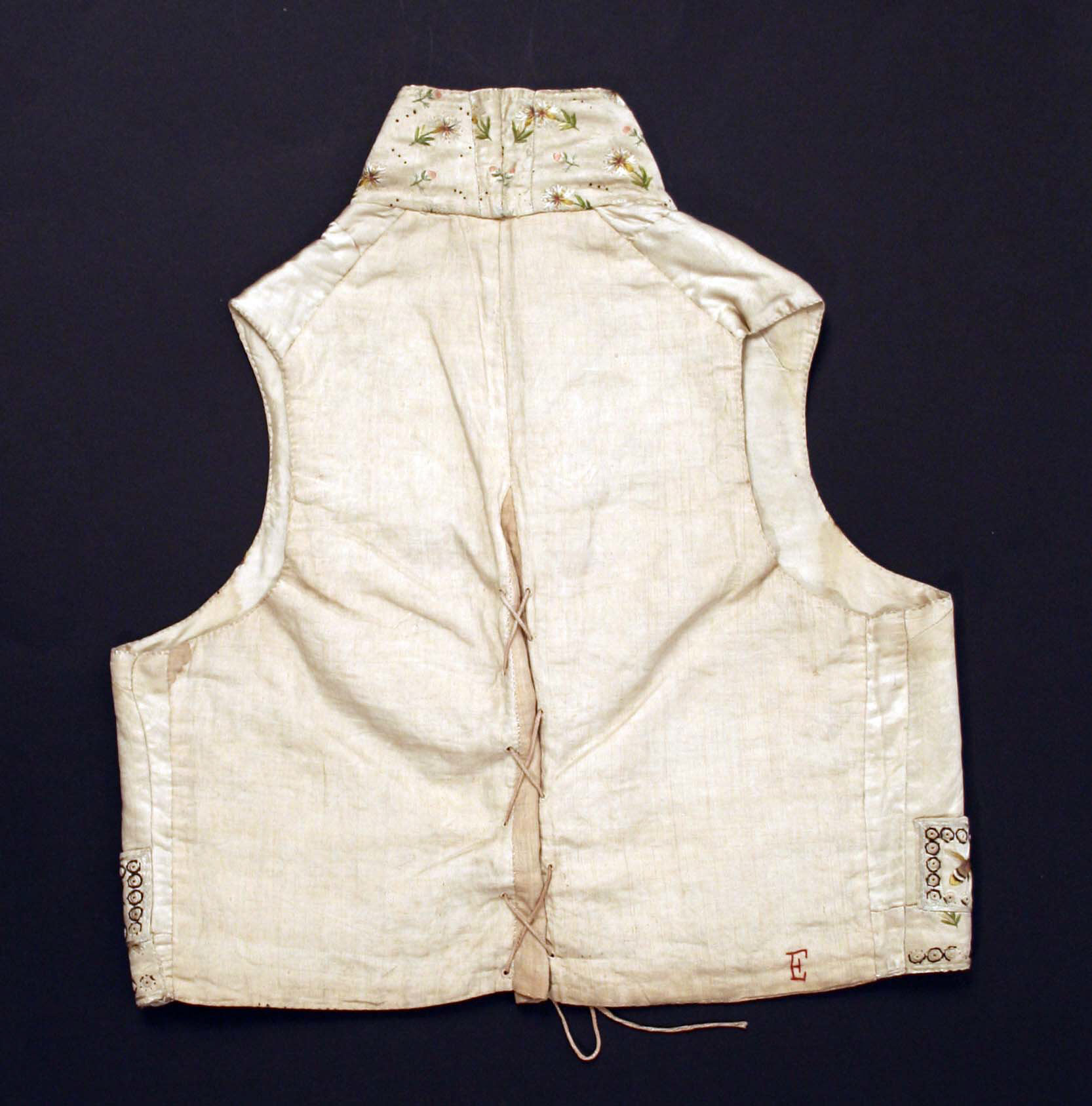
1795-1800 American or European silk vest

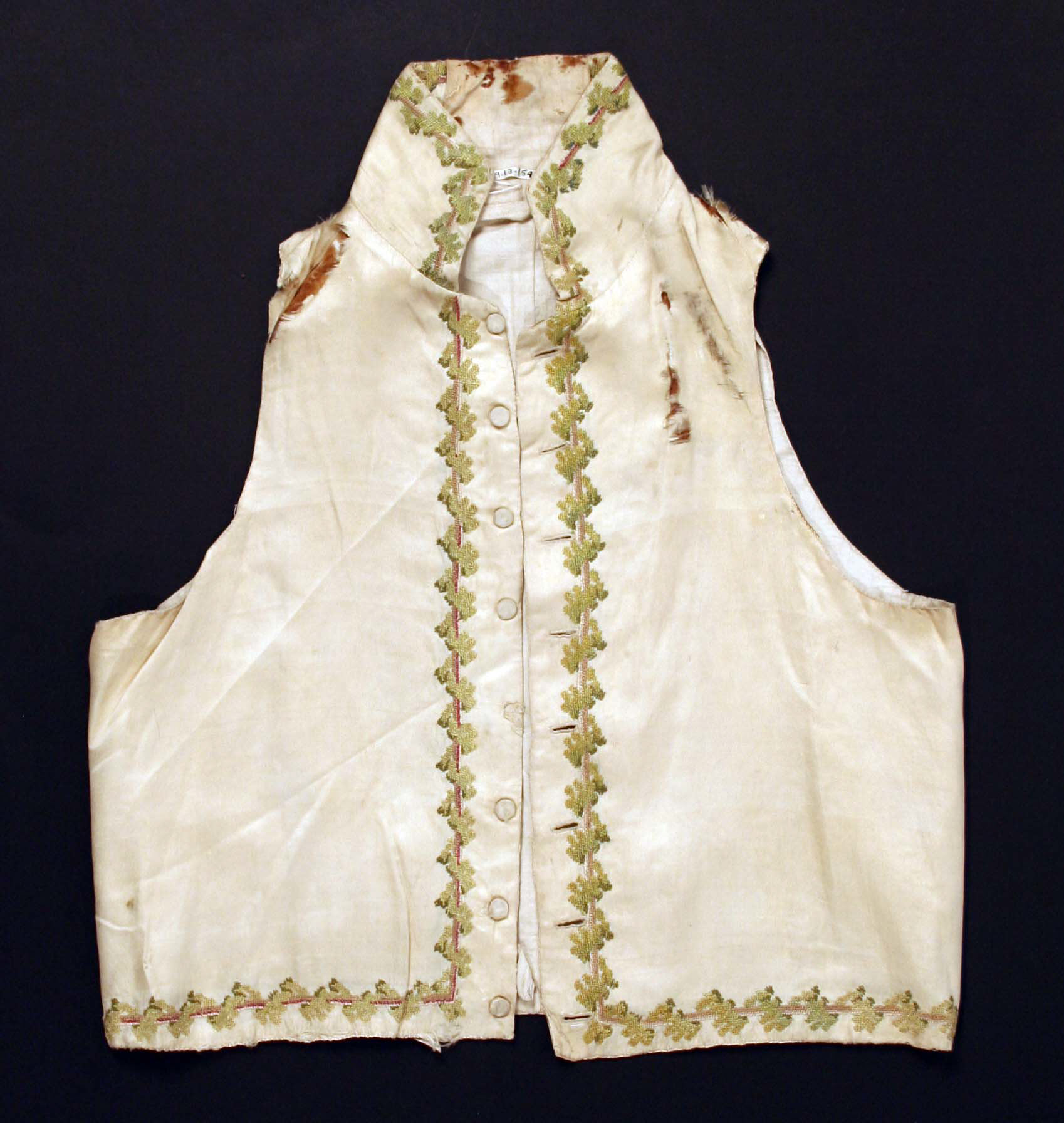
1800-1815 American or European silk vest

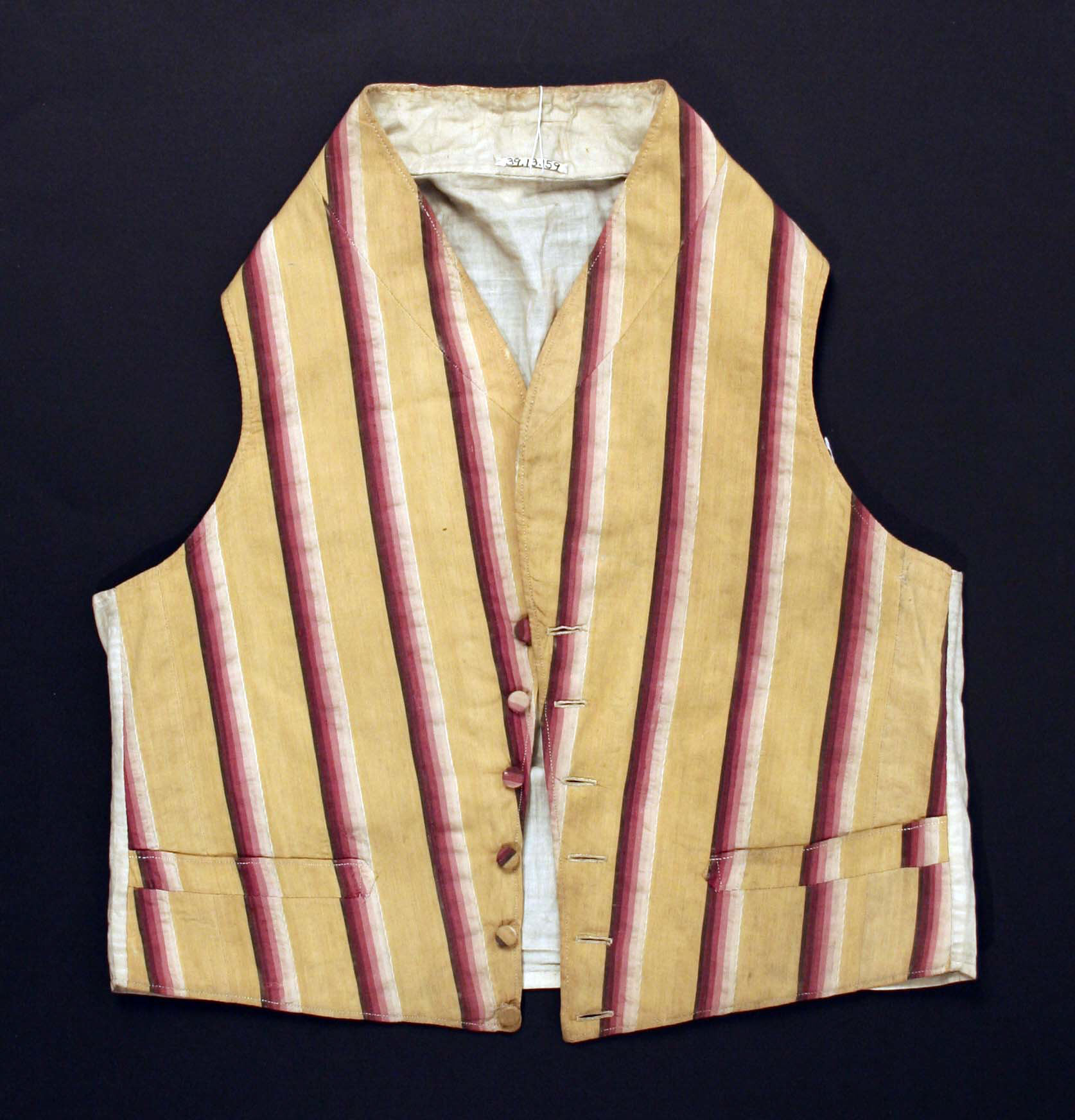
1823 American or European vest

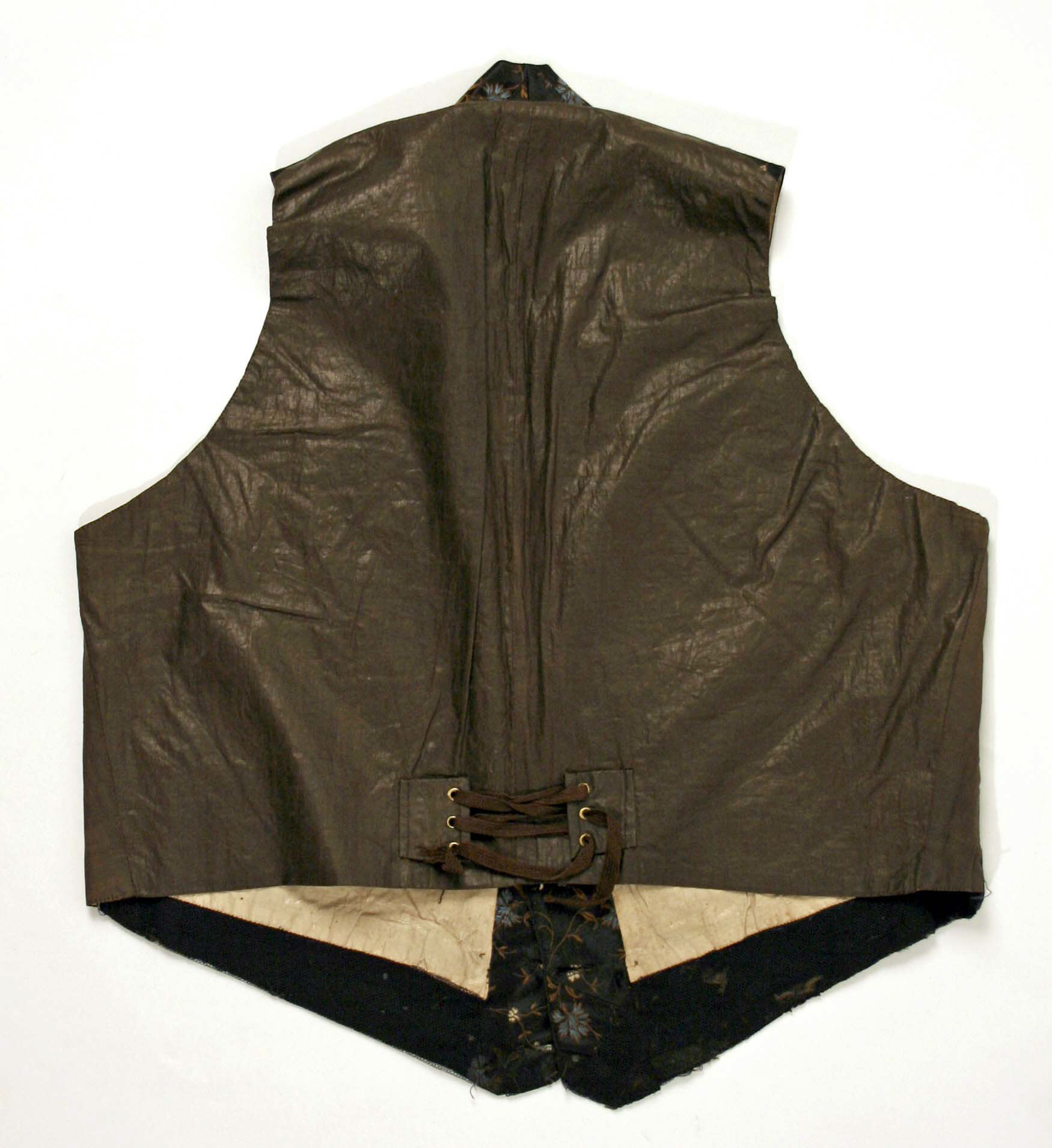
1830-1849 American or European vest

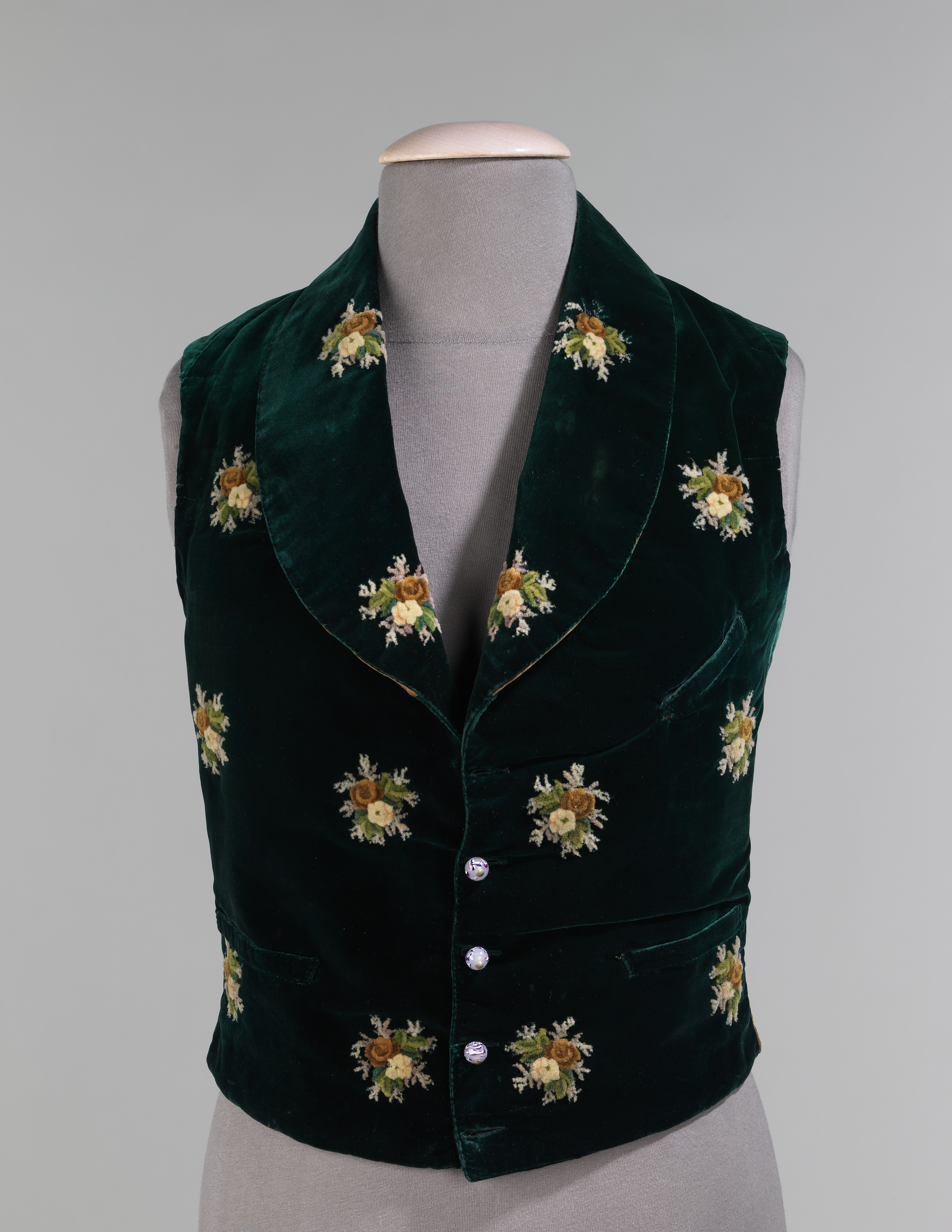
1838 American embellished evening vest

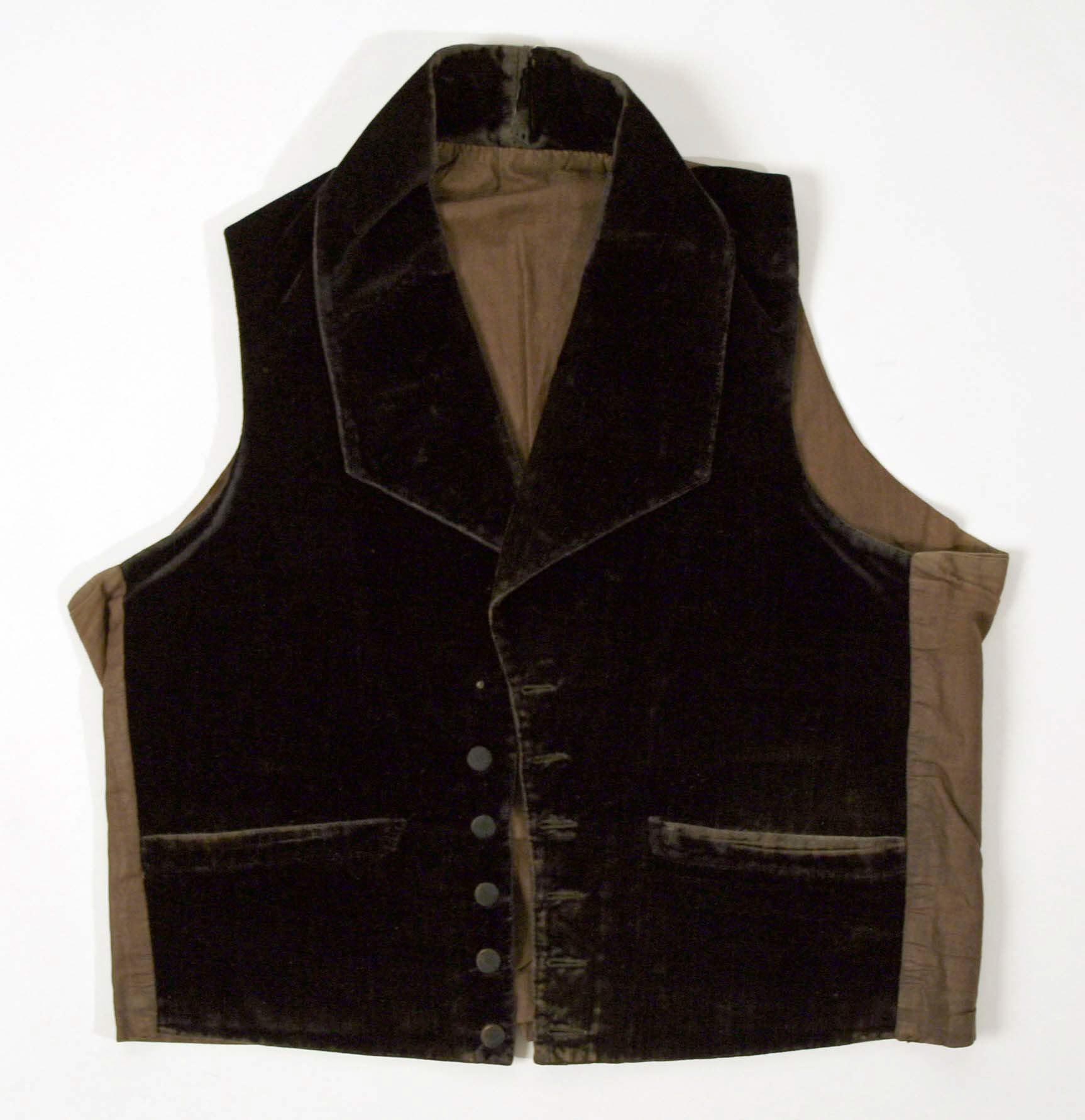
1840 American or European vest

1850 European silk vest

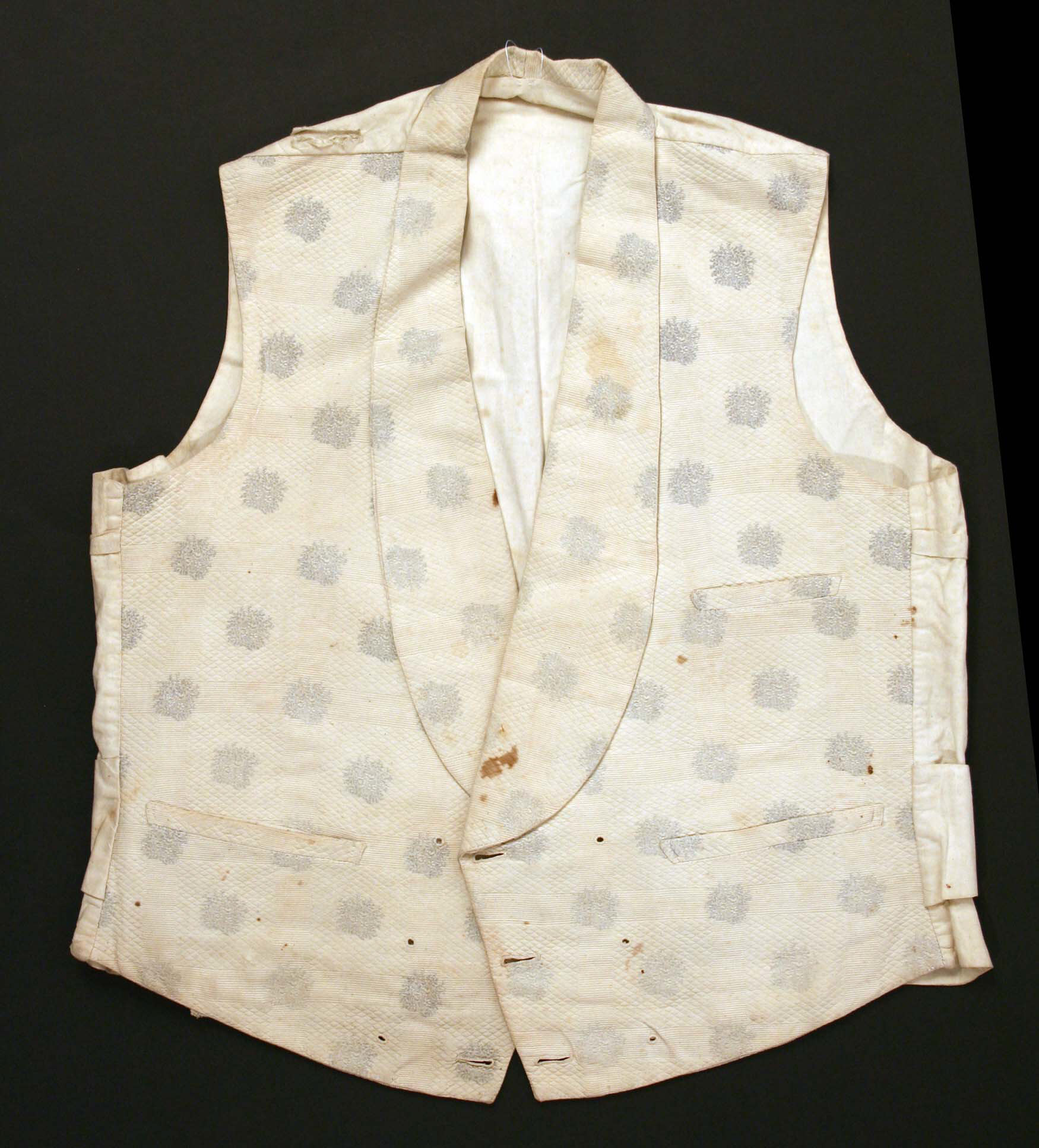
Mid-19th century American cotton vest

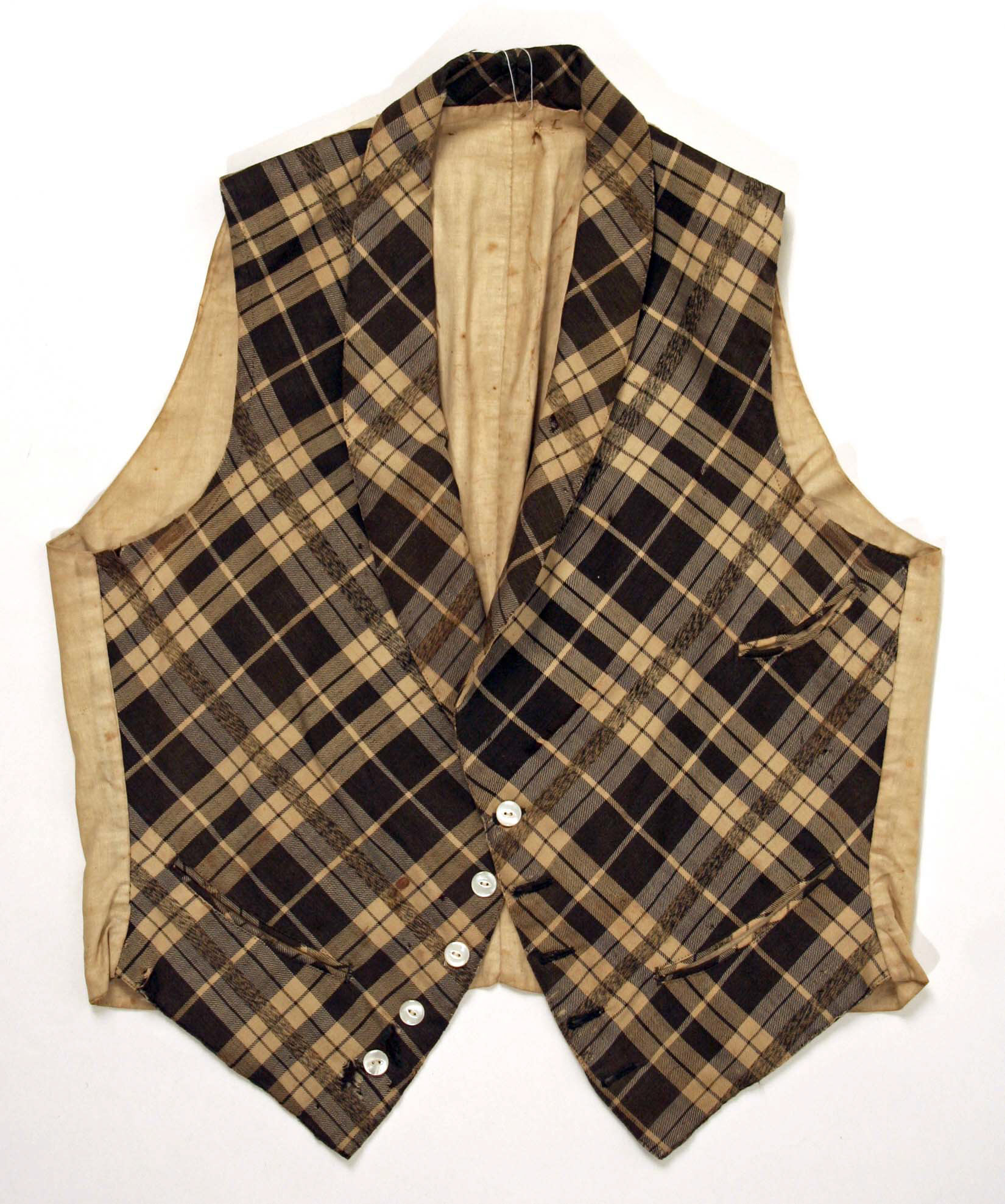
Mid-19th century American linen and wool vest

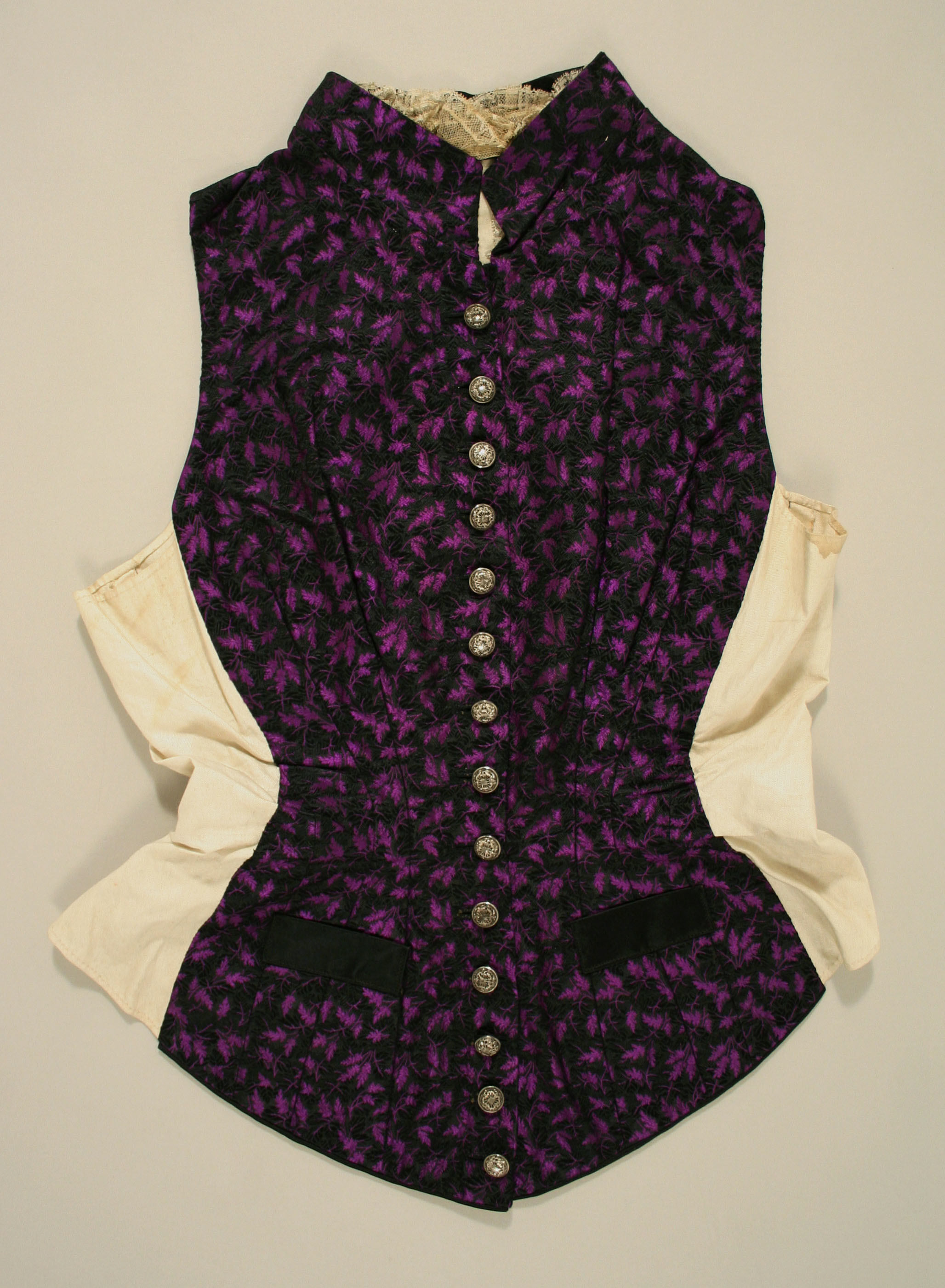
1850-1889 American or European vest

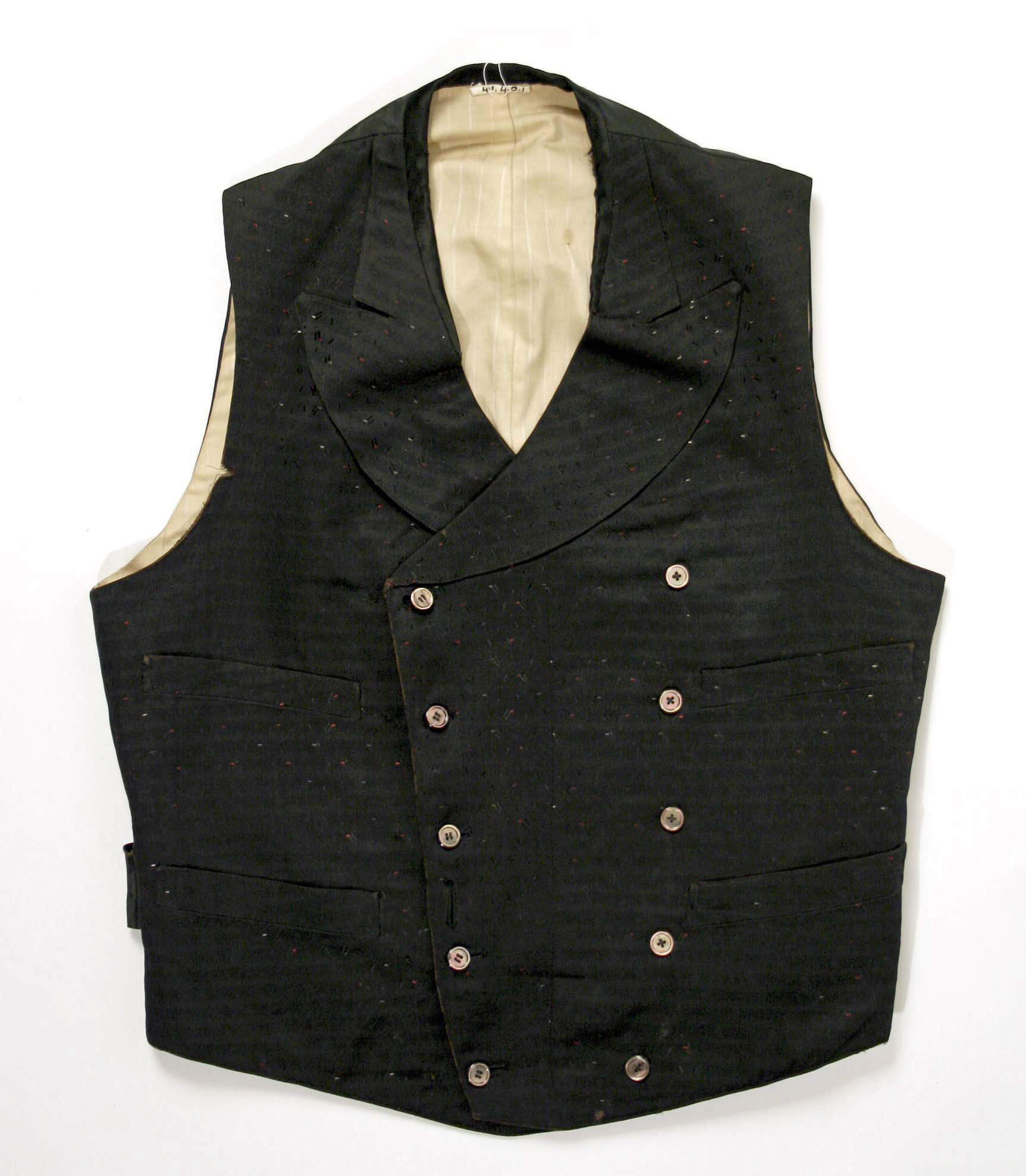
c. 1870 American silk vest

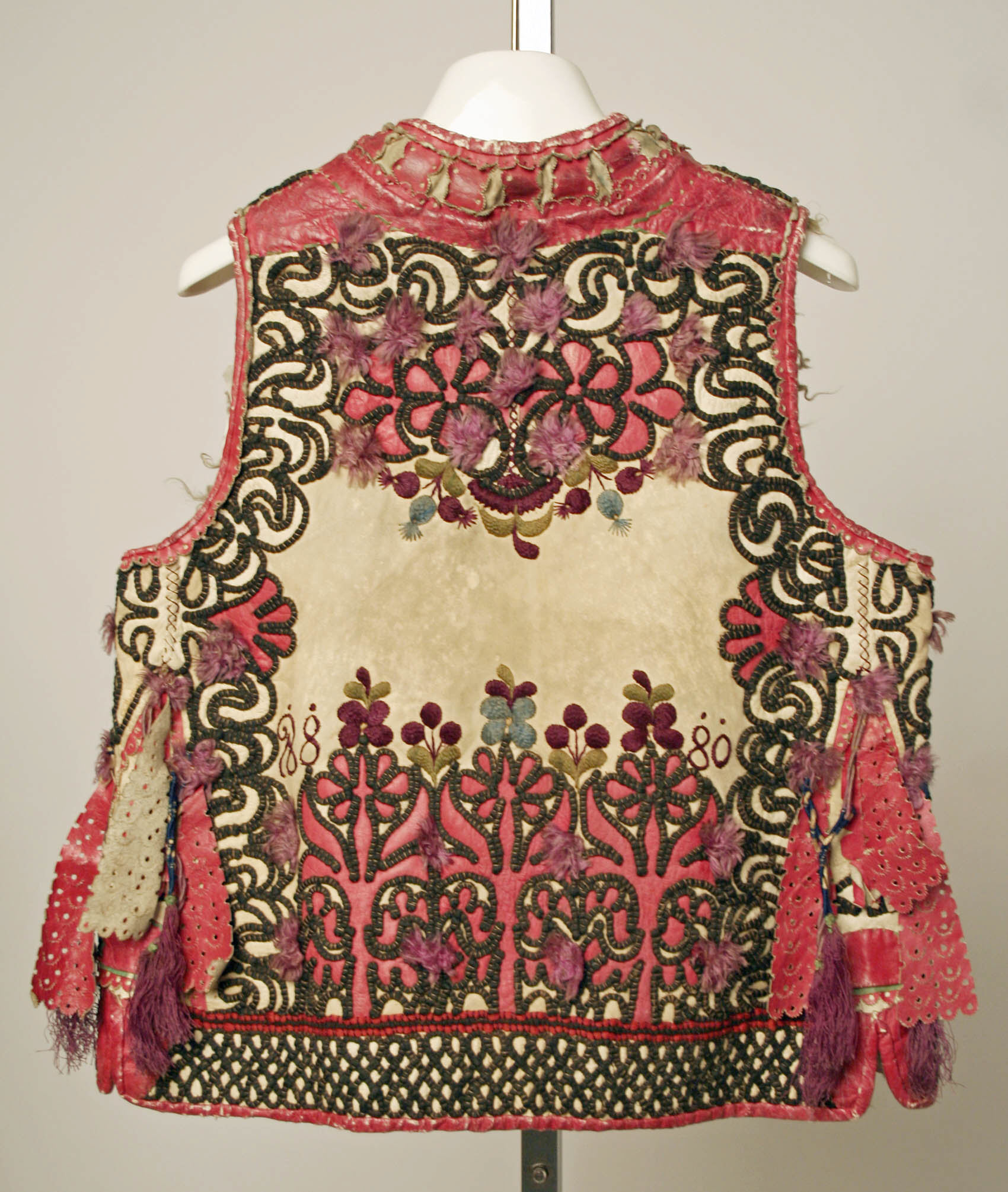
1880 European leather and wool vest

1885-1890 American or European vest

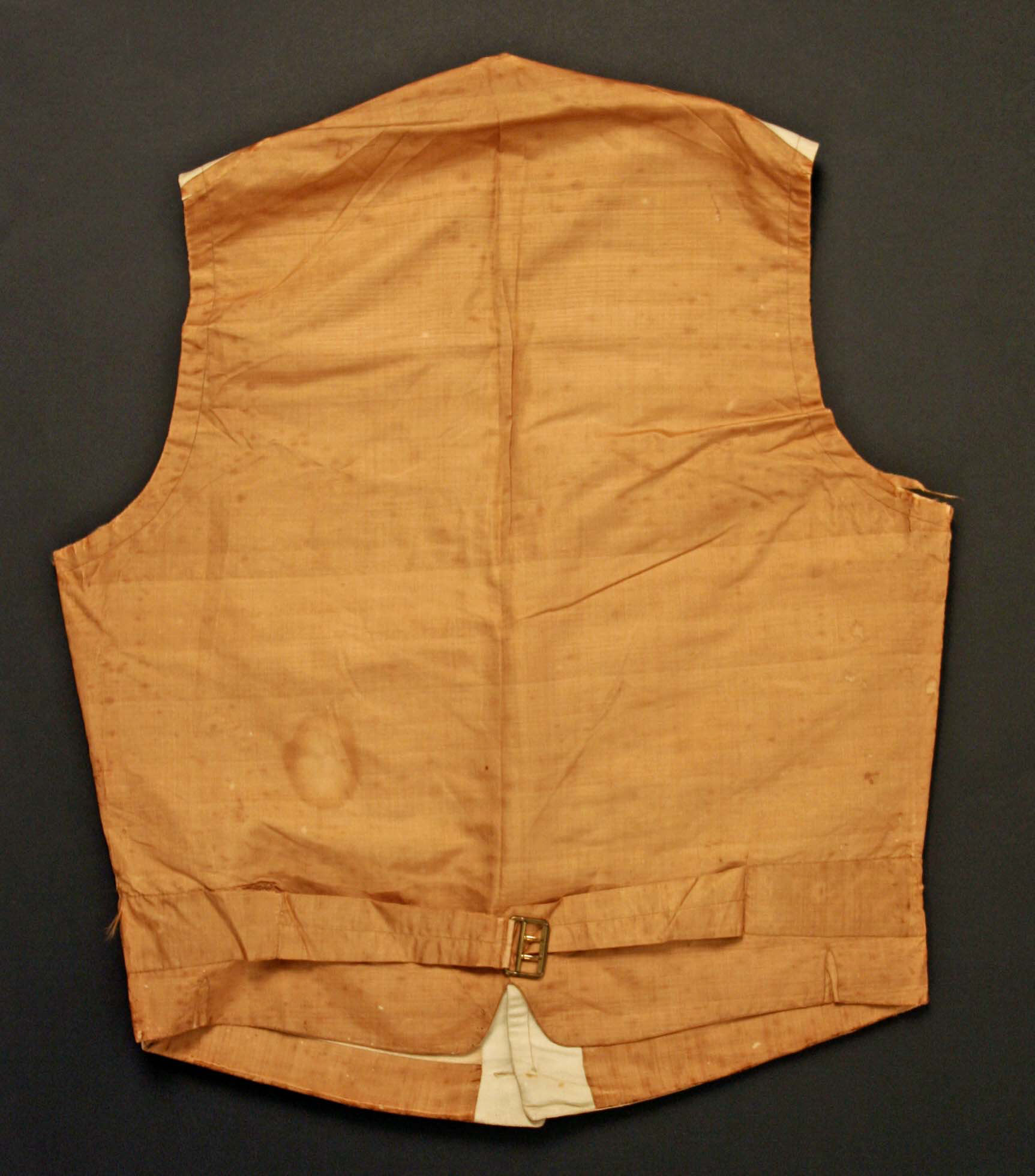
1892 American silk vest

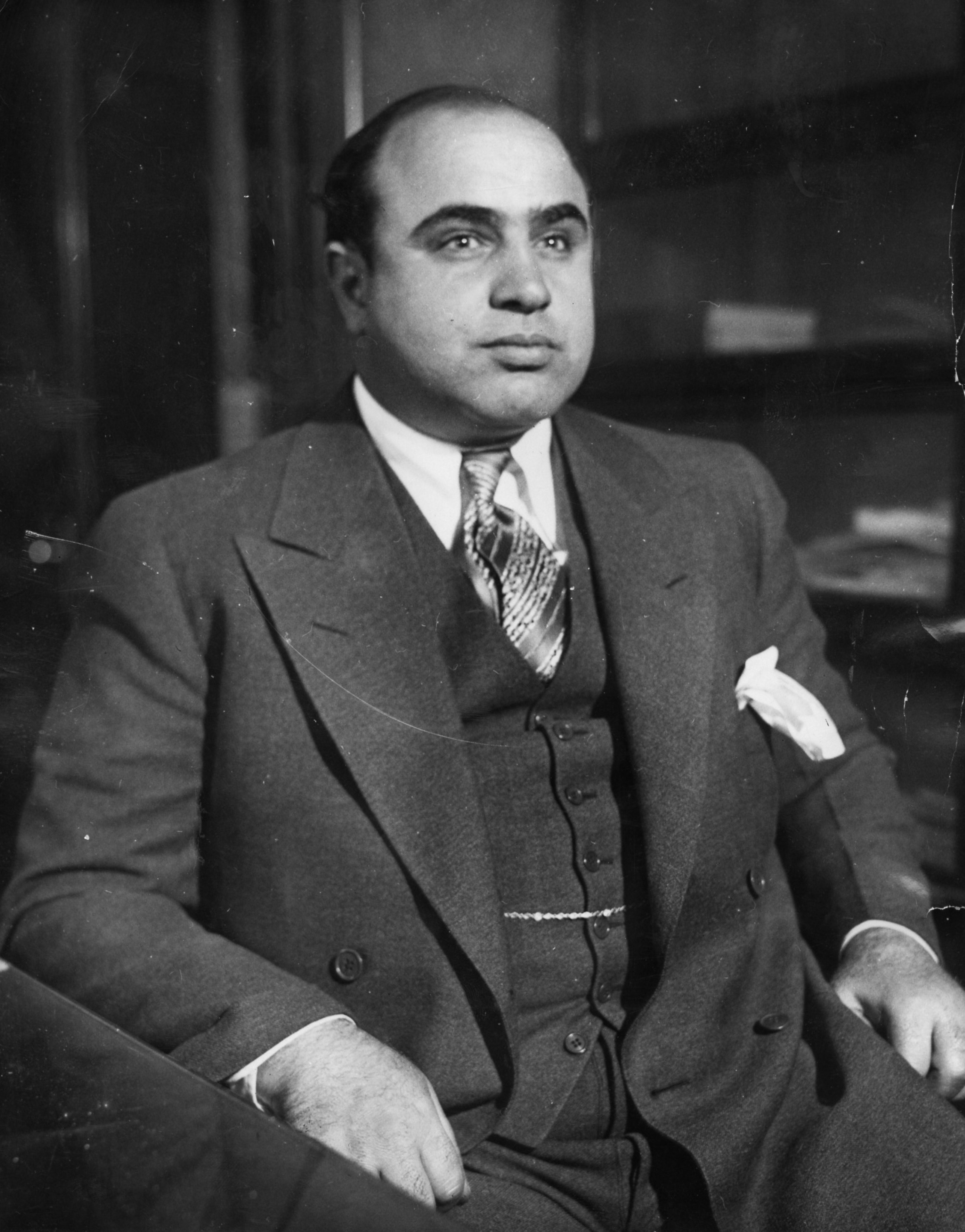
1930 Three-piece suit (worn by Al Capone)

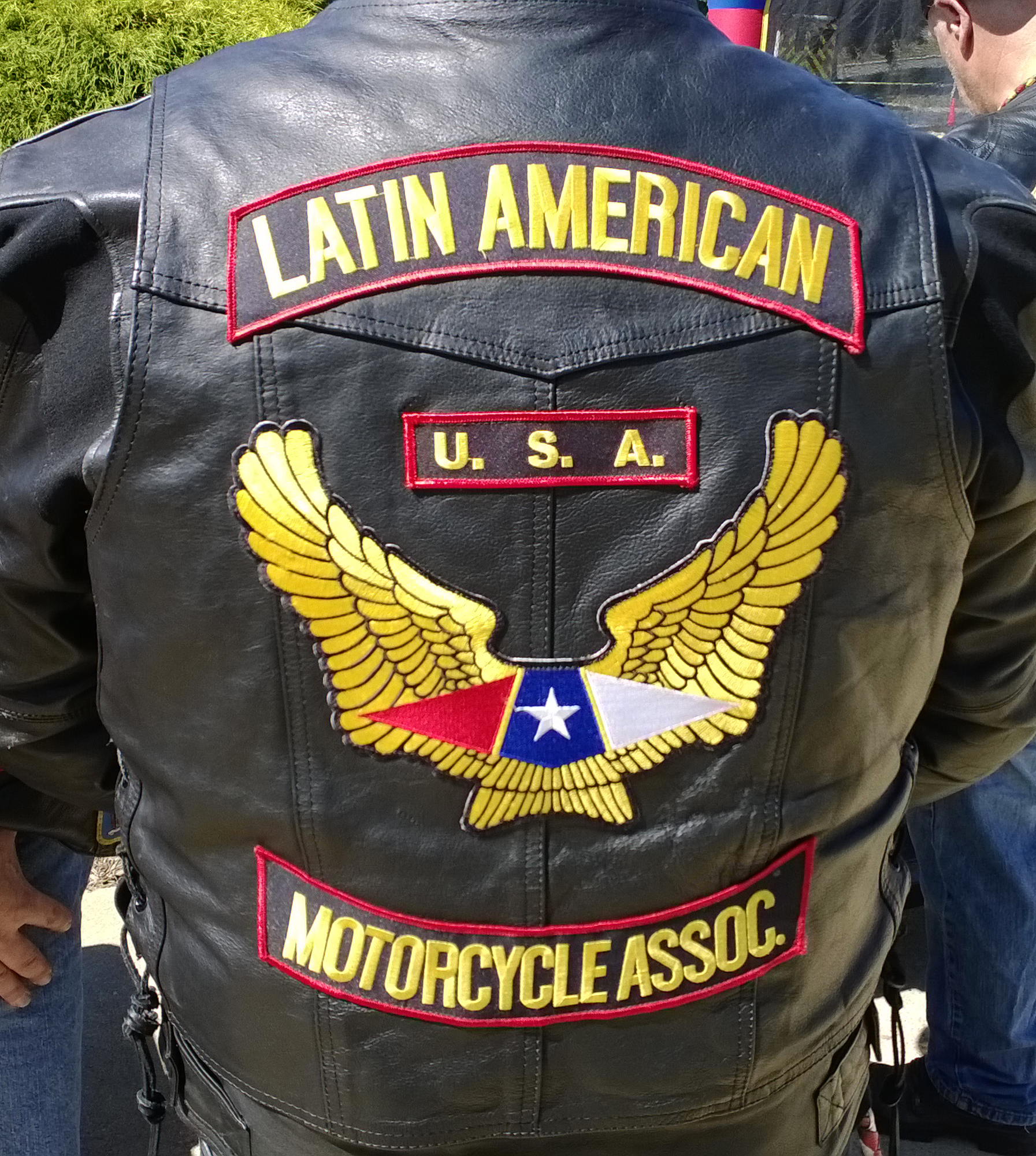
Cut-off biker vest

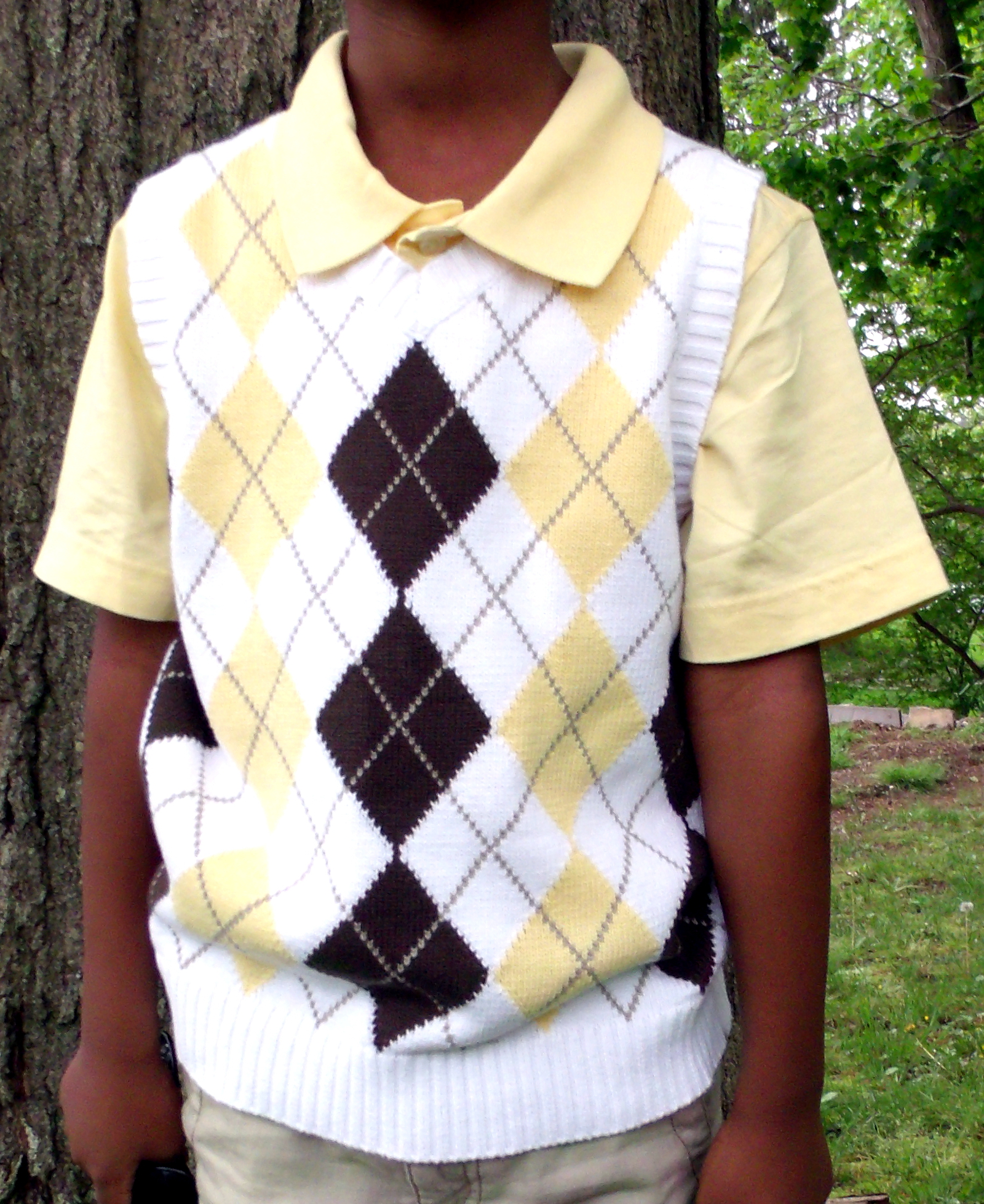
Sweater vest

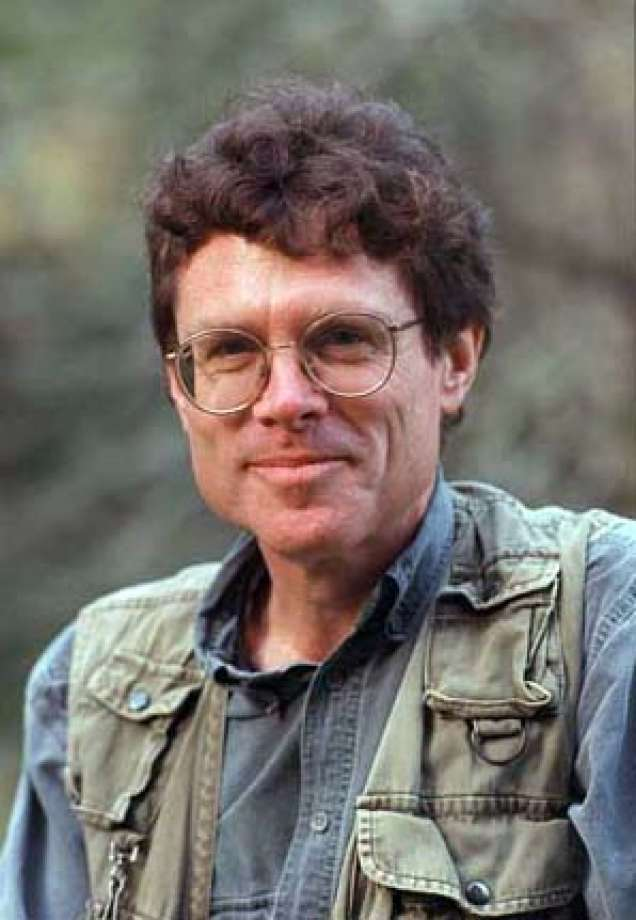
Fisherman's vest

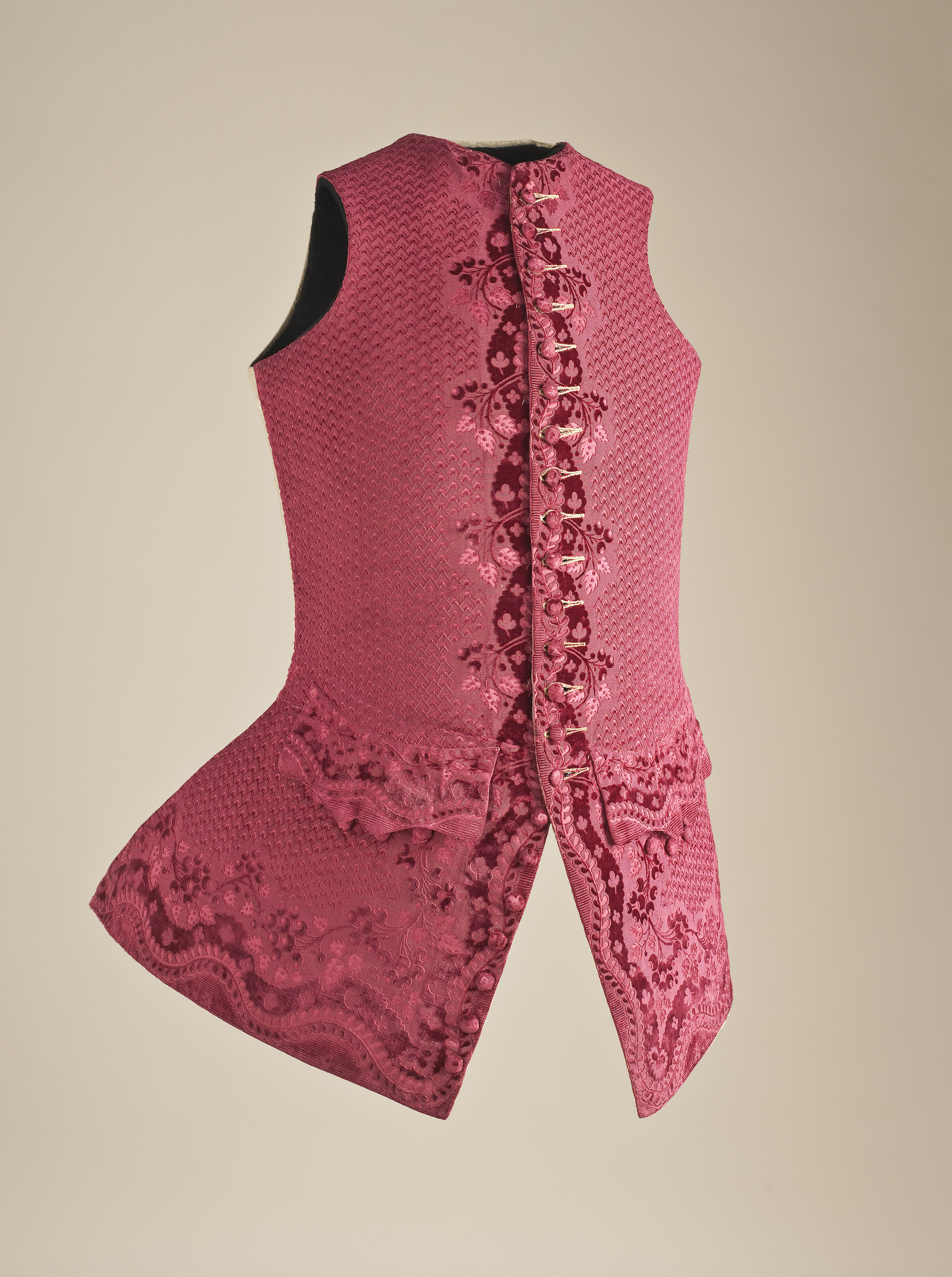
French waistcoat in silk, c. 1750, LACMA.

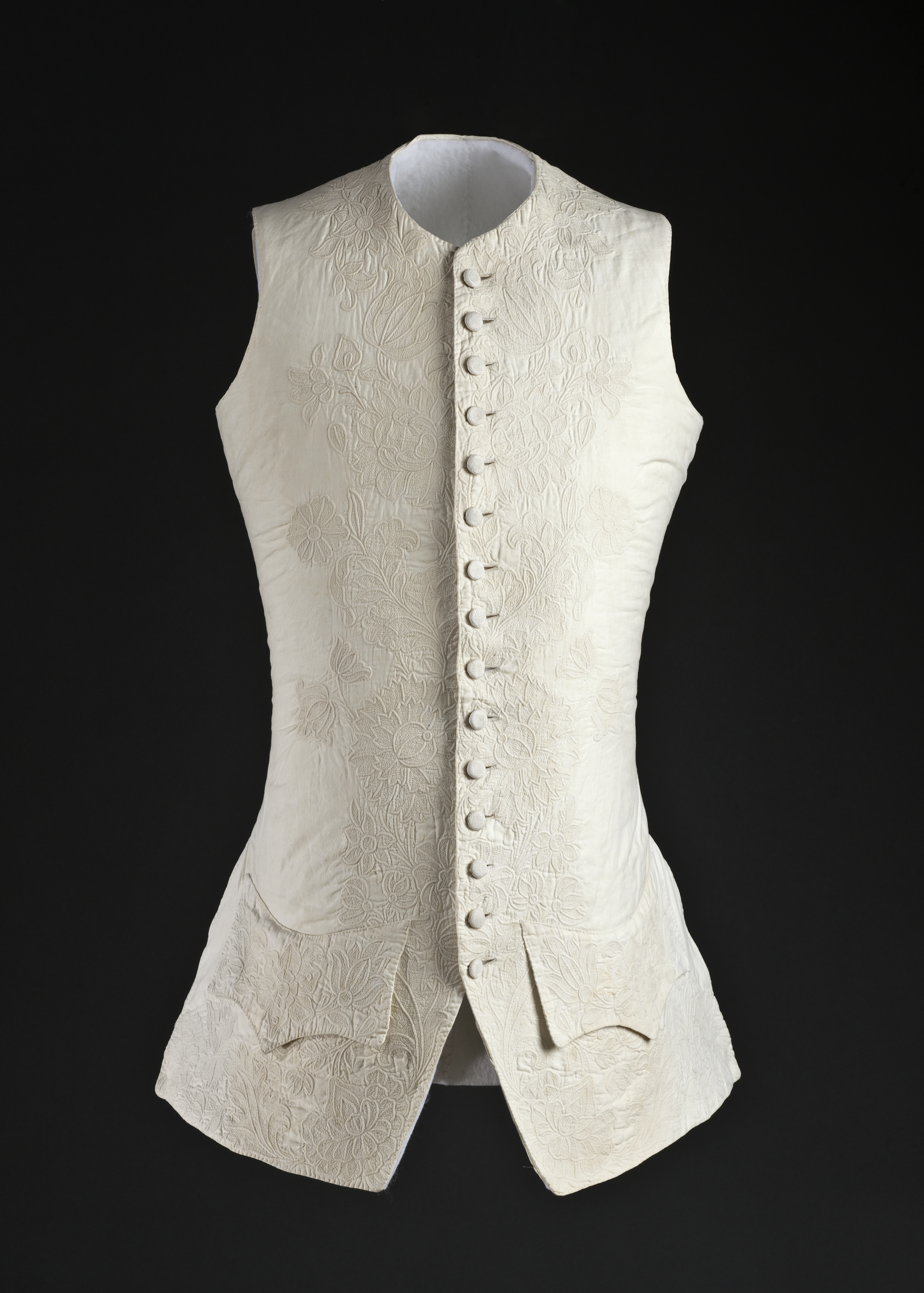
French waistcoat in cotton, circa 1760, LACMA.

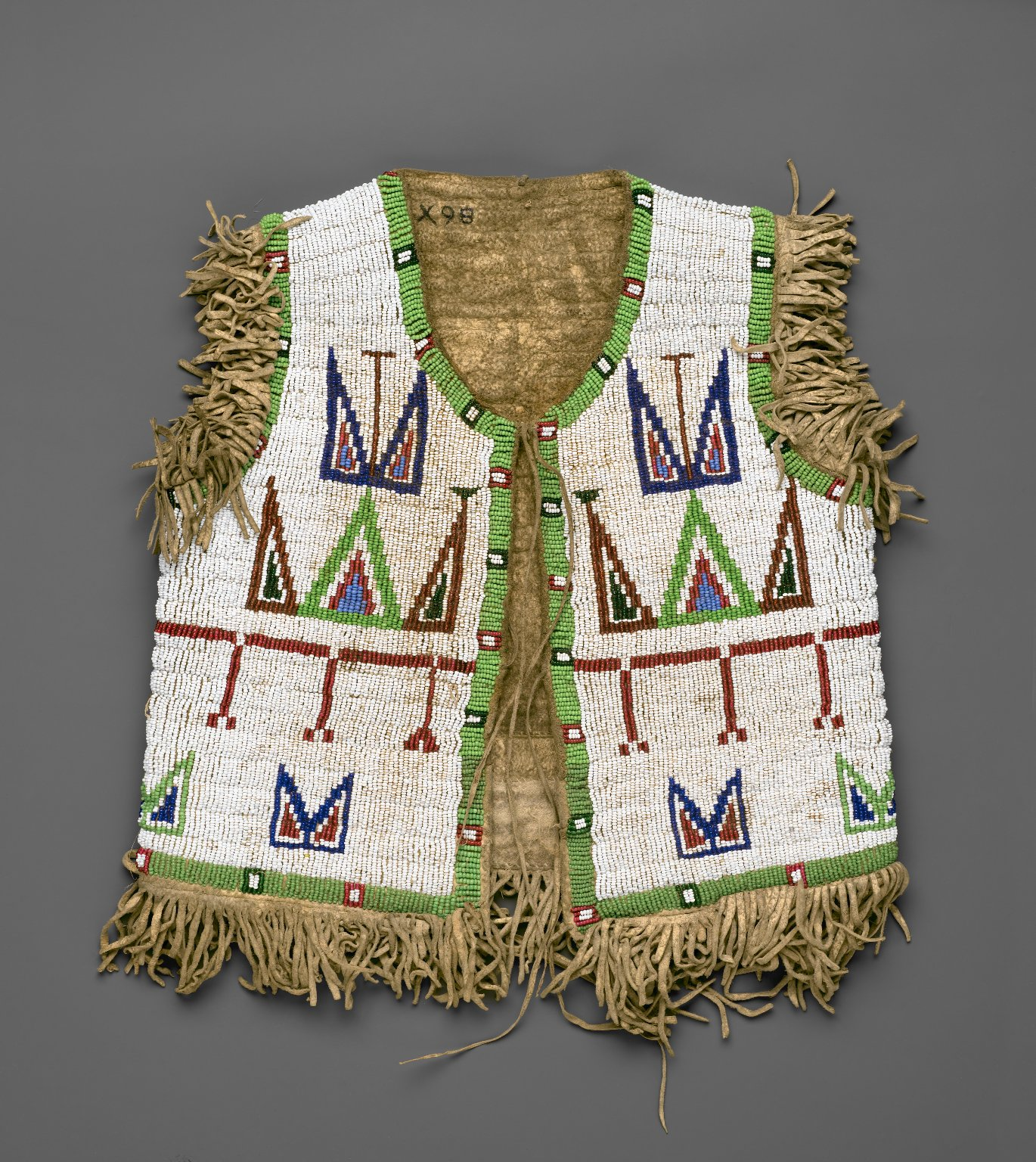
Child's beaded waistcoat, Sioux (Native American), late 19th or early 20th century, Brooklyn Museum

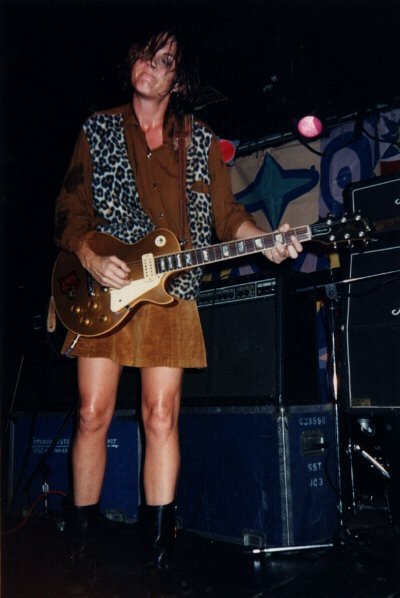
Guitarist Ruthie Morris of Magnapop wearing a leopard print vest on stage

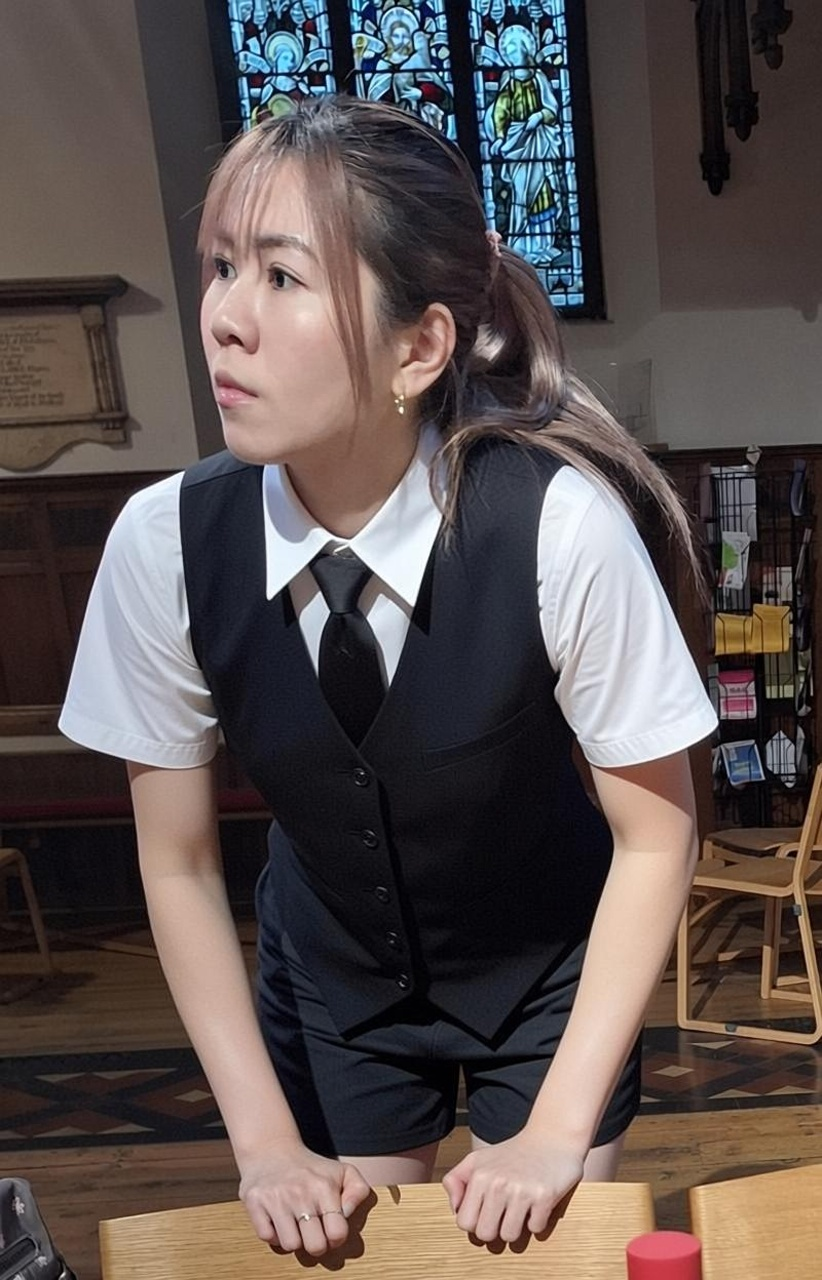
A woman wearing a black waistcoat

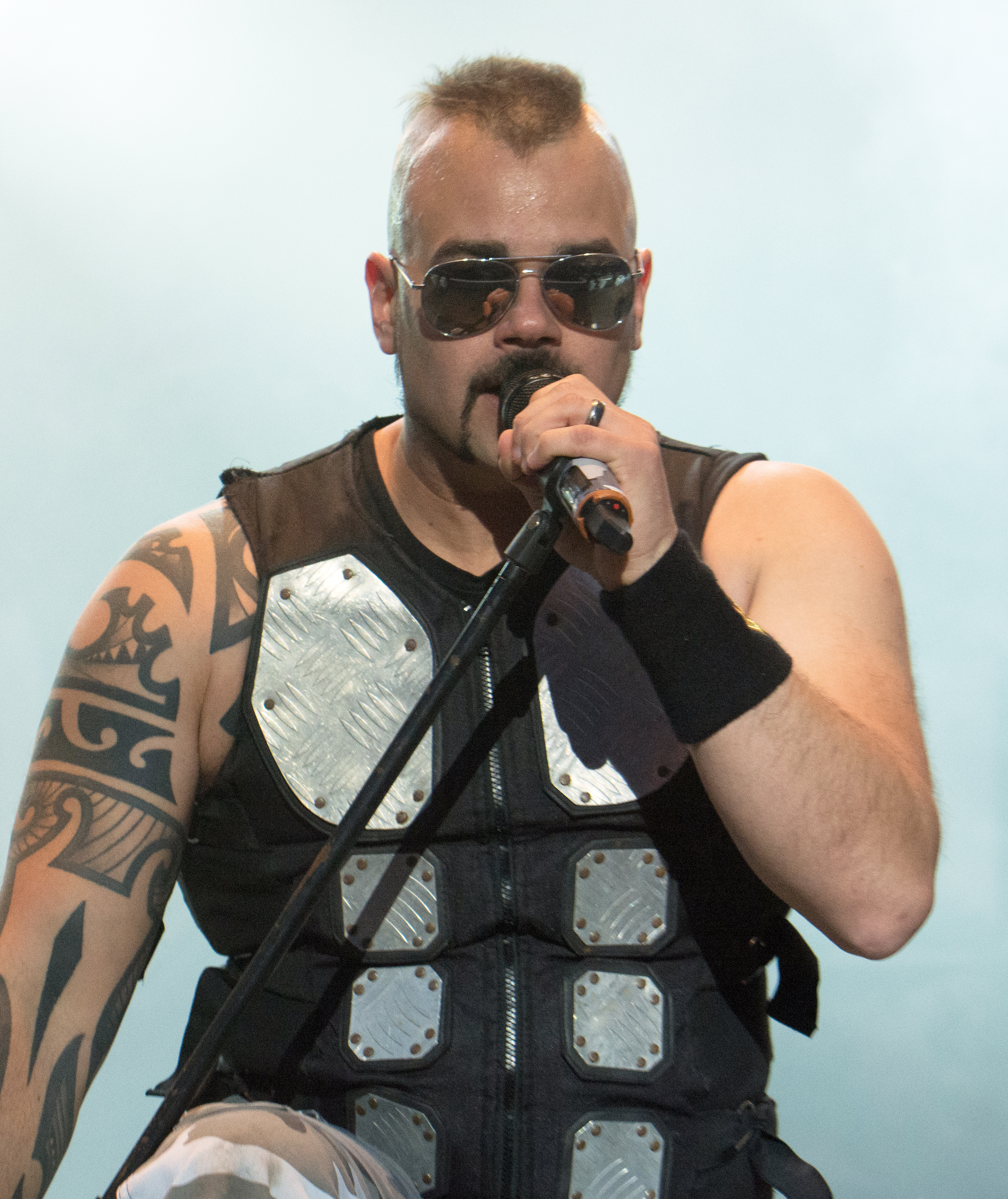
Joakim Brodén of Sabaton is known for wearing a distinctive vest with metal plates when performing with the band.

== See also ==
- Bulletproof vest
- Dress code
- Load-bearing vest
- Mirzai (garment)
- Suicide vest
- Sleeveless shirt
- High-visibility clothing (yellow vests)

=== Eras ===
- Georgian era
- Regency era
- Victorian era
- Edwardian era
