= Bunyan =

Bunyan may refer to:

== People ==
- Jason Bunyan (born 1979), British speedway rider
- John Bunyan (1628–1688), English Baptist preacher and author of The Pilgrim's Progress
- John Bunyan Slaughter (1848–1928), American rancher and banker
- Maureen Bunyan (born 1946), American journalist
- Bunyan Joseph (1894-1986), Indian Bishop
- Vashti Bunyan (born 1945), English musician
- Jay Ryan (actor) (born Jay Bunyan, 1981), New Zealand actor
- Bunyan Edmund Vijayam (1933-2019), Indian Geologist

== Places ==
- Bunyan, New South Wales, Australia
- Bunyan, Wisconsin, United States
- Bünyan, Central Anatolia, Turkey

== Arts and culture ==
- Paul Bunyan, mythical lumberjack in American folklore
- Paul Bunyan (operetta), by Benjamin Britten featuring the mythical lumberjack

== See also ==
- Bunion, a foot deformity
- Banyan (disambiguation)
