= Bania =

Bania may refer to:

- Bania (caste), also Baniya or Vanika, a trader or merchant belonging to the Indian business class
- Bania (Newar caste), one of the Newar Uray castes of Kathmandu, traders specialising in traditional medicines
- Bania, Central African Republic, a village in Mambéré-Kadéï, Central African Republic
- Bănia, a commune in Caraş-Severin County, Romania
- Bania, part of the Swoszowice district of Kraków, Poland
- Bănia River, a tributary of the Nera River in Romania

== People with the family name Bania ==
- Piotr Bania (born 1973), Polish football player
- Kenny Bania, secondary character on the Seinfeld TV series

== See also ==
- Banian (disambiguation)
- Banias, an archaeological site at the foot of Mt. Hermon in the Golan Heights
- Baniya (surname)
- Banya (disambiguation)
- Banyan (disambiguation)
- Banija (or Banovina), a region in Croatia
