= Banya =

Banya may refer to:

== Places ==
=== Australia ===
- Banya, Queensland, a locality in the Sunshine Coast Region, Queensland, Australia

=== Bulgaria ===
- Banya, Blagoevgrad Province, a thermal spa and mountain resort in southwest Bulgaria
- Banya, Burgas Province, a village in southeast Bulgaria
- Banya, Pazardzhik Province, a village in the Panagyurishte municipality, Bulgaria
- Banya, Plovdiv Province, a town in southern Bulgaria
- Banya, Sliven Province, a village in central Bulgaria
- Constantine's Banya, an old name variant of the city of Kyustendil, Bulgaria

=== Romania ===
- Bánya, the Hungarian name for Bănia Commune, Caraş-Severin County, Romania

== Other ==
- Banya (sauna), a traditional Russian steam bath
- BanYa, a South Korean musical group
- Banya: The Explosive Delivery Man, a comic by Kim Young-oh
- Banya, an honorific for royalty and nobility in Burmese names
- Banya, mother of the 14th-century King U of Goryeo
- Bania (caste), also Baniya or Vanika, a trader or merchant belonging to the Indian business class

== See also ==
- Bania (disambiguation)
- Banyan (disambiguation)
- Baniya (disambiguation)
