= List of storms named Banyan =

The name Banyan has been used for four tropical cyclones in the western North Pacific Ocean. The name was contributed by Hong Kong and refers to a banyan tree (Ficus microcarpa), a type of tree commonly seen in Hong Kong.

- Severe Tropical Storm Banyan (2005) (T0507, 07W) – struck Japan.
- Tropical Storm Banyan (2011) (T1120, 23W, Ramon) – struck the Philippines.
- Typhoon Banyan (2017) (T1712, 14W) – a category 3 typhoon that remained out at sea.
- Tropical Storm Banyan (2022) (T2223, 27W, Queenie) – degenerated to remnant low before reaching the Philippines.

Preceded by Jamjari	Pacific typhoon season names Banyan	Succeeded by Yamaneko
