= Banyan merchants =

Indian Ocean merchants

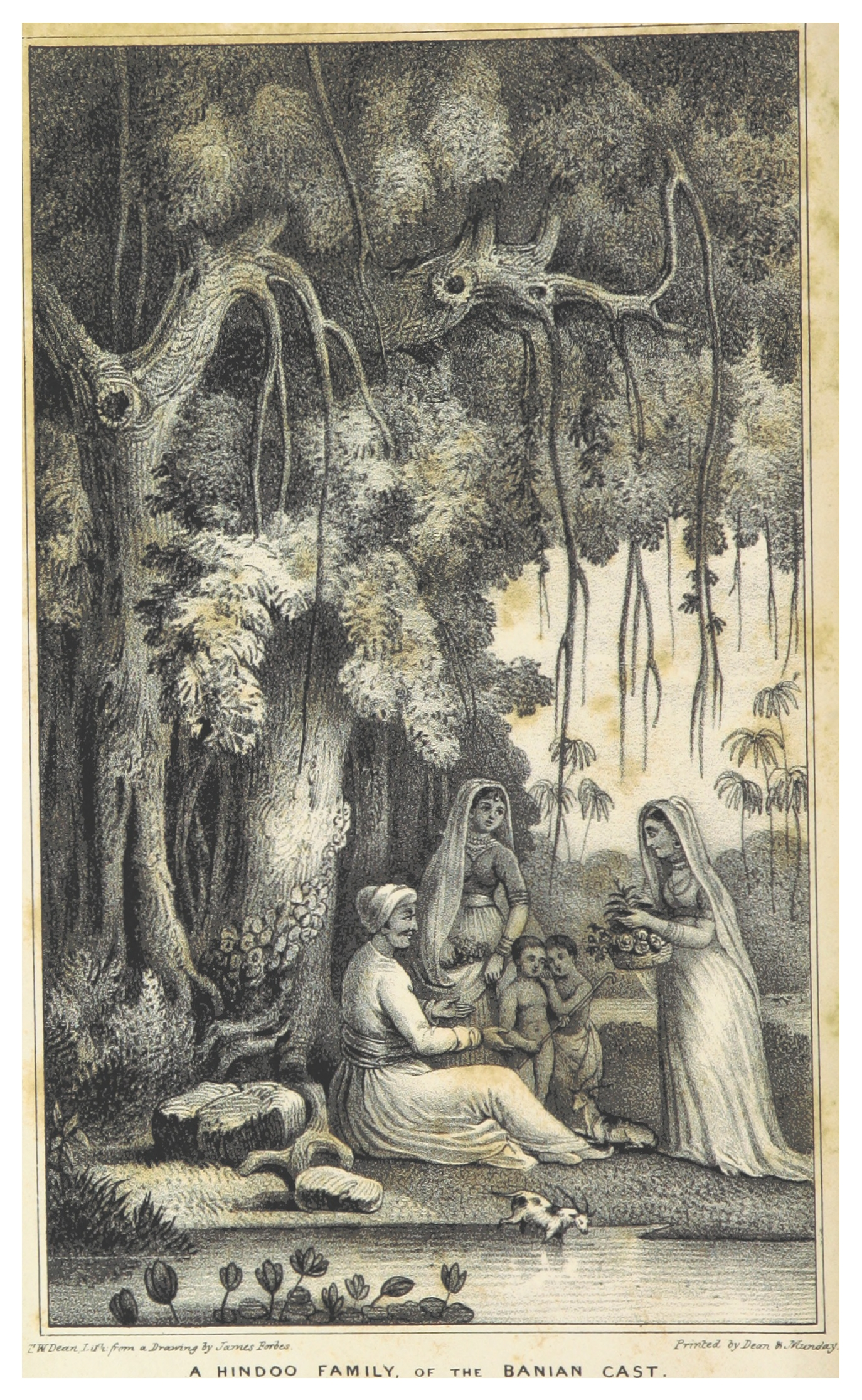
A Hindoo Family, Banyan Cast (c. 1830)

In the Indian Ocean trade, Banyan merchants are Indian merchants who are clearly distinguished from others by their Banyan clothing, their diet, and by the manner in which they conduct trade.

== History ==
The Banyan people are mentioned in the Periplus of the Erythraean Sea (1st century CE) in the context of Indo-Roman trade relations in Egypt and Sokotra, Dahlak Island and Suakim, Massawa, Muscat, Zanzibar, the Gulf of Aden, Aydhab, Hadramut, Syria, Persia and Europe. Evliya Çelebi (1611-1684) mentions in the Seyahatname that the language of the Rumelian Roma people from Gümülcine (Komotini) has Banyan roots.

== See also ==
- Bania (caste), a Jain or Hindu mercantile caste
