= Banian Hospital =

The origin of the Banian Hospital in Western writing has been traced back to Henry Lord's A Display of two forraigne sects in the East Indies. Here he emphasized the hospital's use for injured birds, alongside commentaries on vegetarianism and protections for insects. Historian, Will Sweetman, asserts that such accounts depict Svetambara Jains.

Accounts of the hospital in eighteenth-century French orientalist literature expanded the kinds of animals cared for to include lice and other blood sucking vermin and to include cattle, goat, and dogs too sick or old to work.

The following is an account of a bestiary at Surat offered by a nineteenth-century visitor to the city. It appeared in The Mirror of Literature, Amusement, and Instruction on 1 September 1827.

"The Banian hospital at Surat is a most remarkable institution; it consists of a large plot of ground, enclosed with high walls, divided into several courts or wards, for the accommodation of animals; in sickness it for themselves. At my visit, the hospital contained horses, mules, oxen, sheep, goats, monkeys, poultry, pigeons, and a variety of birds, with an aged tortoise, who was known to have been there for seventy-five years. The most extraordinary ward was that appropriated to rats, mice, bugs, and other noxious vermin. The overseers of the hospital frequently hire beggars from the streets, for a stipulated sum, to pass a night among the fleas, lice, and bugs, on the express condition of suffering them to enjoy their feast without molestation."

In 1818, Sir Richard Philips rejected the idea that this stemmed from Banian beliefs in metempsychosis, as many previous authors did, and espoused it stemmed from benevolence.
