= Baniya (surname) =

Origin
- Origin: Nepali Hindu
- Region of origin: Nepal

Baniya or Bania (Nepali: बानियाँ) is a surname of people belonging to the Hindu Chhetri (Kshatriya caste) of Nepal. The alternate spelling of Bania is used by Chhetris and in India (Hindi: बनिया). Notable people with these surnames include:

== Baniya ==
- Chandra Prakash Baniya (born 1951), Nepali writer, columnist, educator and politician
- Kanhaiya Baniya, Nepalese politician
- Mohan Baniya, Nepalese politician
- Rabindra Singh Baniya, Nepalese actor, producer and theatre actor/director
- Rayyan Baniya (born 1999), Italian footballer
- Dr. Sunil Baniya (born 1995), Nepalese medical doctor

== Bania ==
- Indra Bania (1942–2015), Indian theatre actor, playwright, film actor and director

== See also ==
- Bania (caste)
