= Banian, Iran =

Banian or Baneyan or Baniyan (Persian: بنيان or بانيان) in Iran may refer to:

- Banian, Bushehr (بنيان - Banīān)
- Banian, Fars (بانيان - Bānīān)
