= Banyan (clothing) =

Loose gown or coat worn by men in the 18th century

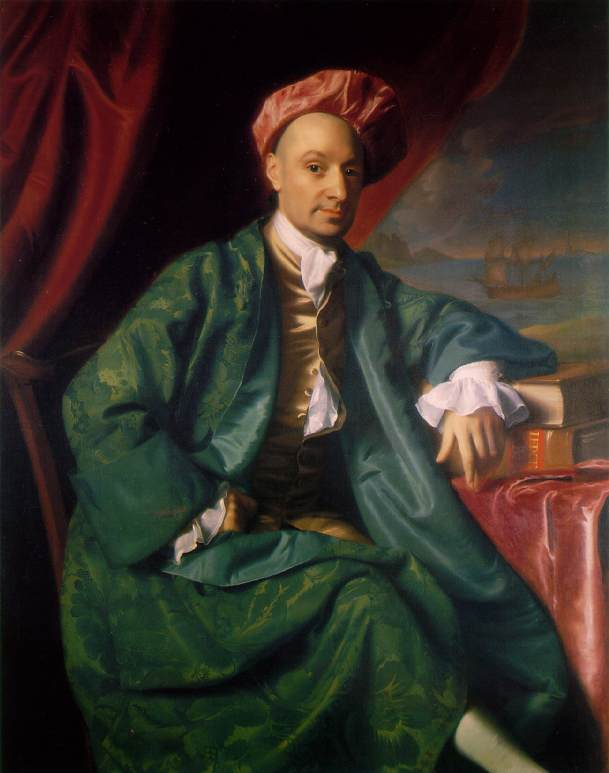
Nicholas Boylston in a brilliant green banyan and a cap, painted by John Singleton Copley, 1767.

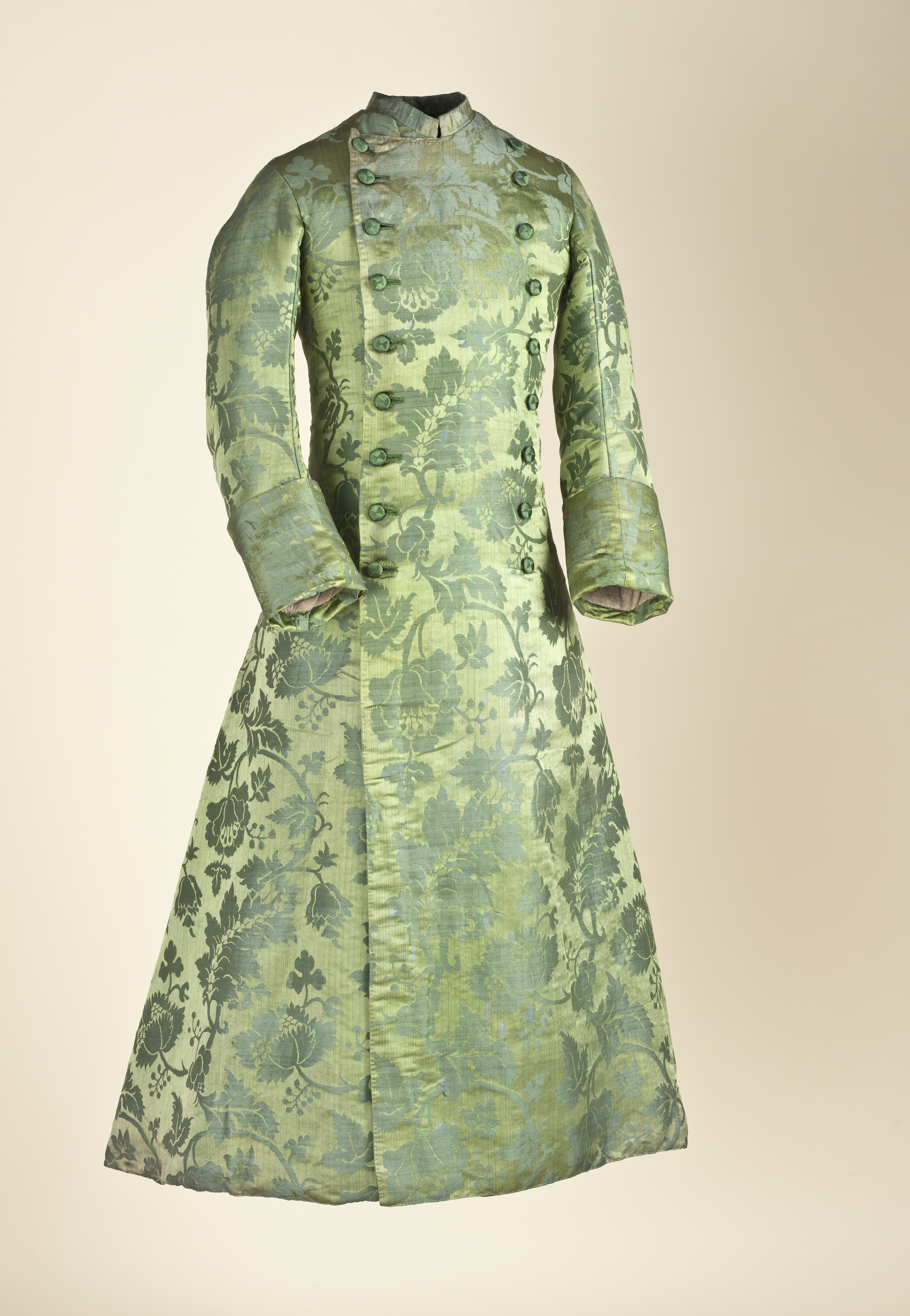
Fitted banyan, 1750–1760

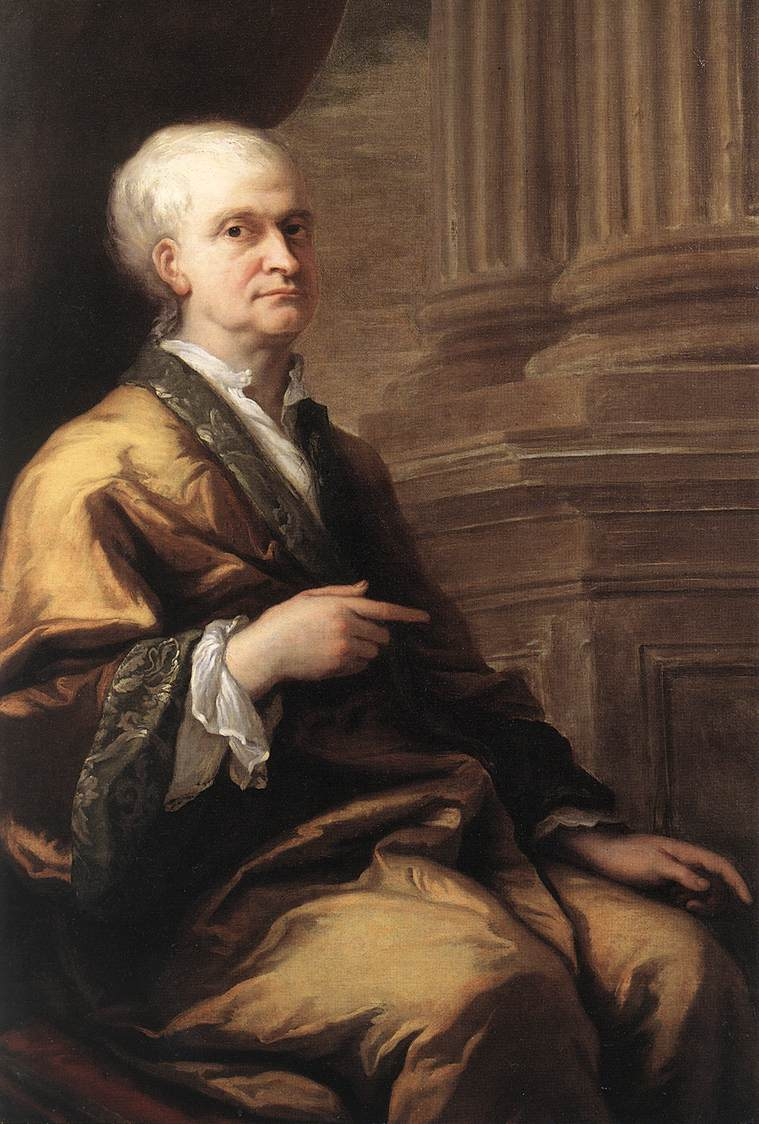
Sir Isaac Newton painted by James Thornhill, 1709–1715. Note T-shaped cut without a shoulder seam.

A banyan is a garment worn by European men and women in the late 17th and 18th century, influenced by the Japanese kimono brought to Europe by the Dutch East India Company in the mid-17th century. "Baniyan" is also commonly used in present-day Indian English and other countries in the Indian subcontinent to mean "vest" or "undershirt".

Also called a morning gown, wrapper, robe de chambre or nightgown, the banyan was a loose, T-shaped gown or kimono-like garment, made of cotton, linen, or silk and worn at home as a sort of dressing gown or informal coat over the shirt and breeches. The typical banyan was cut en chemise, with the sleeves and body cut as one piece. It was usually paired with a soft, turban-like cap worn in place of the formal periwig. An alternative style of banyan was cut like a coat, fitted, with set-in sleeves, and was closed with buttons and buttonholes.

== History ==
The word comes through Portuguese banian and Arabic بنيان, banyān, from the Gujarati વાણિયો, vāṇiyo, meaning "merchant".

European women wore banyans in the 18th century as dressing gowns in the morning, before robing for the day, or in the evening before bed over undergarments, as described by the Victoria and Albert Museum in London, England.

In the humid climate of Colonial Virginia, gentlemen wore lightweight banyans as informal street wear in summer.

It was fashionable for men of an intellectual or philosophical bent to have their portraits painted while wearing banyans. Benjamin Rush wrote:

Loose dresses contribute to the easy and vigorous exercise of the faculties of the mind. This remark is so obvious, and so generally known, that we find studious men are always painted in gowns, when they are seated in their libraries.

Despite the name "nightgown", the banyan was not worn for sleeping.

== See also ==
- Portrait of Benjamin Rush in a banyan, 1783
- Smoking jacket
- Kaftan
- Robe
- 1700–1750 in Western fashion
- 1750–1775 in Western fashion
- 1775–1795 in Western fashion
