= Frock =

Various types of loose-fitting outer garment

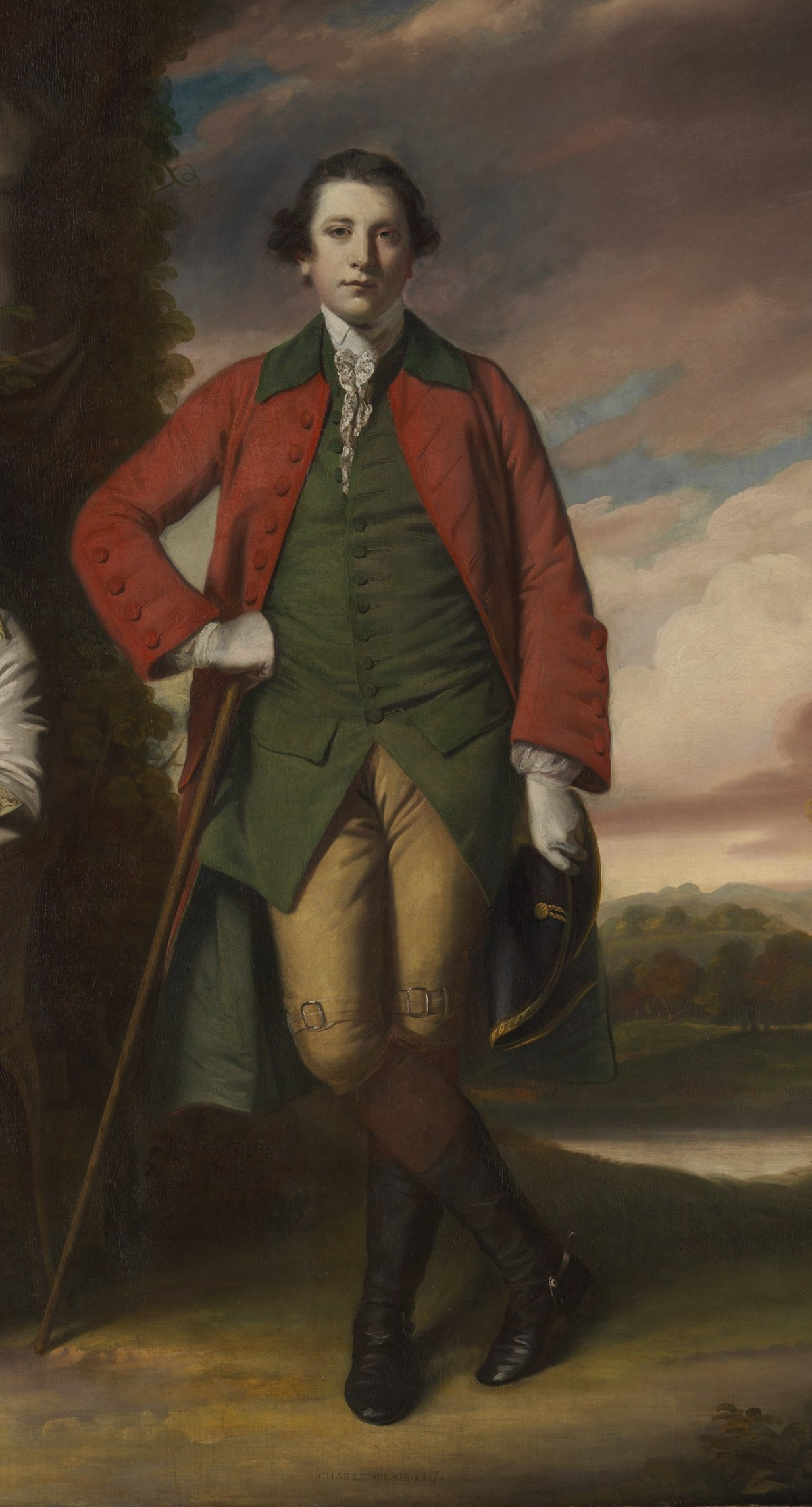
Charles Blair in a frock (c. 1761–66), a coat with a flat collar.

Frock has been used since Middle English as the name for an article of clothing, typically coat-like, for men and women.

== Terminology ==
In British English and in Commonwealth countries the word may be used as an alternative term for a girl's or woman's dress, in particular for a dress suitable for a smart occasion but (in UK English usage) with a hemline higher than a full-length ballgown. In Australia it is frequently used this way, with the phrase "to frock up" meaning to wear a formal dress or gown for a special occasion.

Relatedly, a frock coat is a men's coat style of the 19th century, characterized by full skirts reaching to the lower thigh or knee. Despite the similarity in the name, the frock coat should be regarded as being a distinct garment quite separate from the frock. In the French language the frock coat is called une redingote (from English "riding coat"), and so, unlike the English term, implies no immediate relationship to the frock which is called une fraque. Indeed, the modern French word for a tail coat is un frac which better betrays the historical relationship between the tail coat and the frock. In construction the frock coat could scarcely be more different from the frock for unlike the latter it is usually double breasted, lacks any pockets, lacks a high collar, has V-shaped lapels, is closely fitted and is constructed with a waist seam.

== History ==
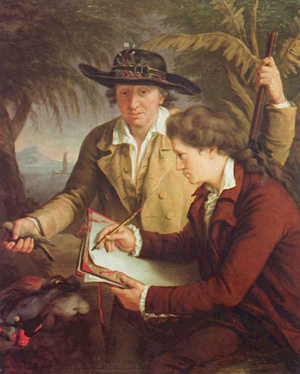
Johann Reinhold Forster with his son Georg Forster (1780) in frocks in Tahiti, by John Francis Rigaud (1742–1810).

Originally, a frock was a loose, long garment with wide, full sleeves, such as the habit of a monk or priest, commonly belted. (This is the origin of the modern term defrock or unfrock, meaning "to eject from the priesthood".)

Throughout the early modern period, "frock" continually applied to various types of clothing, but generally denoting a loosely fitted garment in practice seemingly ranging in styles from resembling a banyan to a tunic.

From the 16th century to the early 20th century, frock was applied to a woman's dress or gown, in the fashion of the day, often indicating an unfitted, comfortable garment for wear in the house, or (later) a light overdress worn with a slip or underdress.

From the 17th century on, a frock was a thigh- or full-length loose outer garment worn by shepherds, workmen, and farm workers in Great Britain, generally of heavy linen with a broad flat collar, now usually called a smock-frock. In some areas, this traditional frock buttons up the front in the manner of a coat, while in others it is a pullover style.

As such, a frock remains a dense knitted overgarment worn by sailors and fishermen, as guernsey frock, jersey frock (now usually simply guernsey and jersey).

=== 18th century ===
In 18th century Britain and the United States, a frock was an unfitted men's coat for hunting or other country pursuits, with a broad, flat collar, derived from the traditional working-class frock.

The precise historical evolution of the frock after the second half of the 18th century is obscure, as is its contrasting features to the justaucorps, the evening wear dress coat, and the supplanting 19th century frock coat.

=== 19th century ===
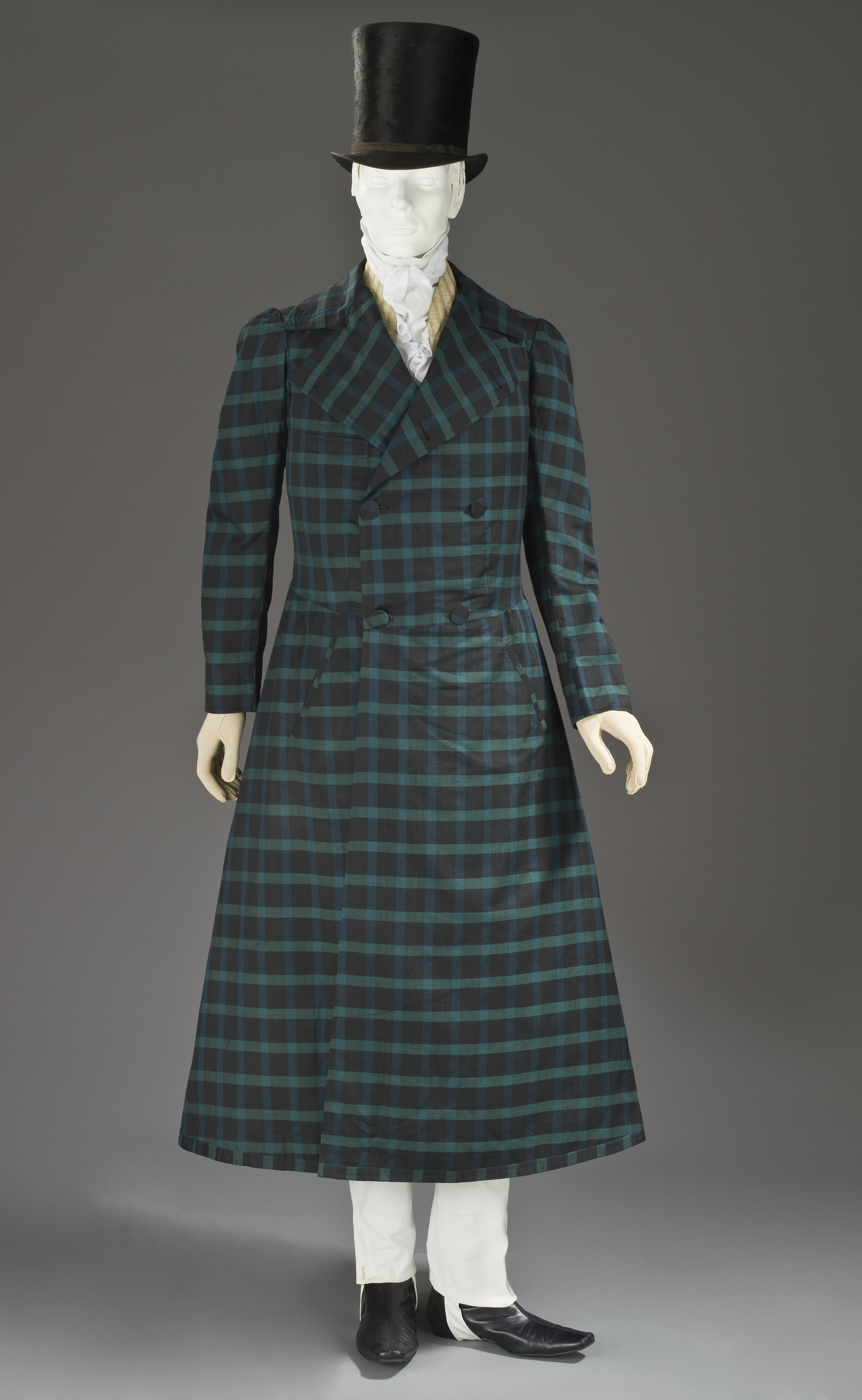
Man's wool and silk twill frock coat, France (1816–20), illustrating the shift from previous 18th century connotations of a frock to early 19th century definition of a (dark) frock coat. Los Angeles County Museum of Art.

Some late in the 18th century versions had it made with a cutaway front without a waist seam. This may have been one of the predecessors of the frock coat or at least the dress coat with horizontally cutaway fronts worn for daytime wear by the early 19th century and from which the modern-day evening wear tail dress coat for white tie is derived. The frock coat in turn became cut away into the modern morning coat, giving us the two modern version of tail coats, but the evolution is blurry. Notwithstanding, it seems as if the frock was gradually supplanted by the frock coat in the early 19th century, whereas the former frock style was relegated to evening wear.

Shapewise, also the great coat may similarly be historically derived from the frock as it similarly is single breasted, with a high and broad collar, waist pockets, and also lacked a waist seam early in its history as can be seen in an example in the Victoria and Albert Museum, London.

== Contemporary feminine connotations ==
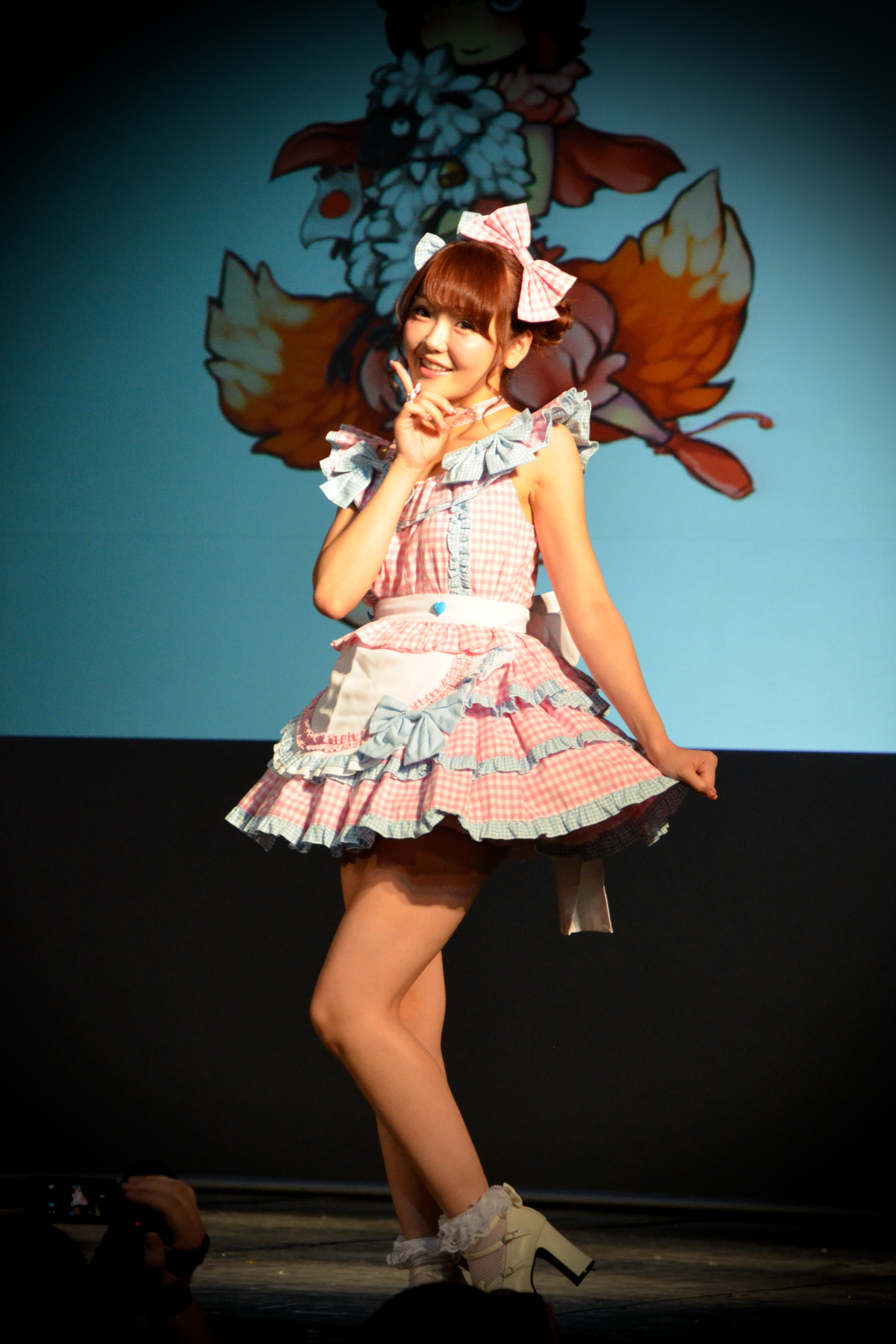
The "frock" as a dress, worn by a woman.

In contemporary times, a "frock" may still designate a woman's or girl's, or child's dress or light overdress.

== See also ==
- Frock coat
- Justaucorps
- "Oil frock", a type of sailor's oilskin
- Tailcoat
