= Tailcoat =

Knee-length coat

A tailcoat is a knee-length coat characterised by a rear section of the skirt (known as the tails), with the front of the skirt cut away.

The tailcoat shares its historical origins in clothes cut for convenient horse-riding in the Early Modern era. From the 18th century, however, tailcoats evolved into general forms of day and evening formal wear, in parallel to how the lounge suit succeeded the frock coat (19th century) and the justacorps (18th century).

Thus, in 21st-century Western dress codes for men, mainly two types of tailcoats have survived:

1. Dress coat, an evening wear item with a squarely cut-away front, worn for formal white tie
2. Morning coat (or cutaway in American English), a day-wear item with a gradually tapered front cut away, worn for formal morning dress

In colloquial language without further specification, "tailcoat" typically designates the former, that is the evening (1) dress coat for white tie.

== History ==
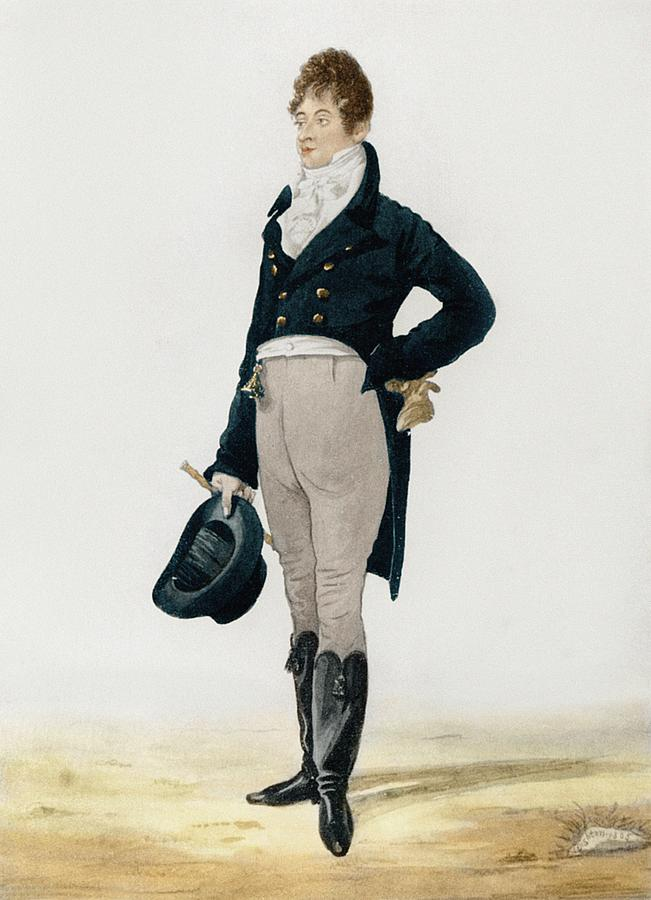
Beau Brummell wears a Regency period dress coat as daytime dress. The coat is able to close and the tails are knee length.

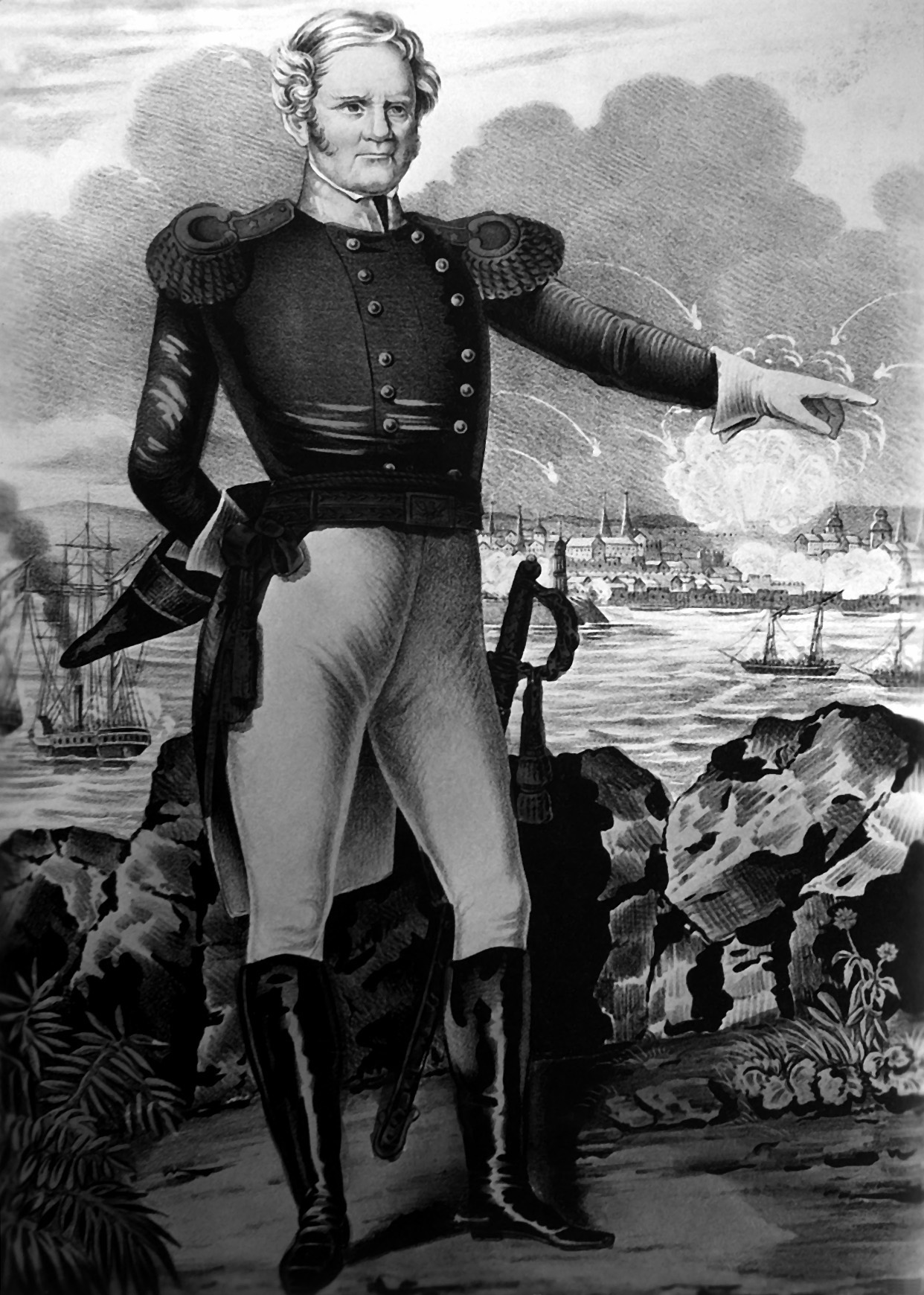
Winfield Scott wearing a tailcoat at the Battle of Veracruz

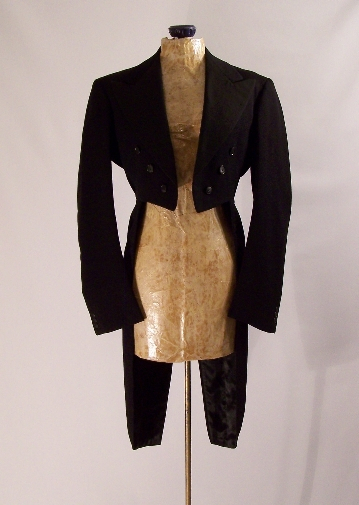
A women's black wool tailcoat, 1939

=== Shadbelly ===
In equestrianism, a variant called a shadbelly is still worn in certain disciplines in its eighteenth-century role as daytime formalwear. It is basically a form of dress coat which is closer in cut to the early nineteenth-century style worn by Beau Brummell than to the modern version worn with evening formal dress. The male version of the shadbelly is often called a "weaselbelly".

=== Levée dress coat ===
This is a type of dress coat traditionally worn with court dress, until the mid-twentieth century. It was made of black velvet and traditionally worn at court, levées, and evening state parties by those who did not wear uniforms. A version made of black barathea was also worn as diplomatic dress.

It was single breasted with a stand-up collar, with plain gauntlet cuffs, and two three-pointed flap pockets on the waist seam. It had six metal buttons at the front, and two decorative buttons at the back. The body of the coat was lined with black silk, and skirts with white silk. It was worn with breeches, black silk hose, white bow tie, white gloves, and court shoes (pumps) with steel buckles. The front of the coat was cut away squarely like a standard dress coat.

=== Military coatee ===
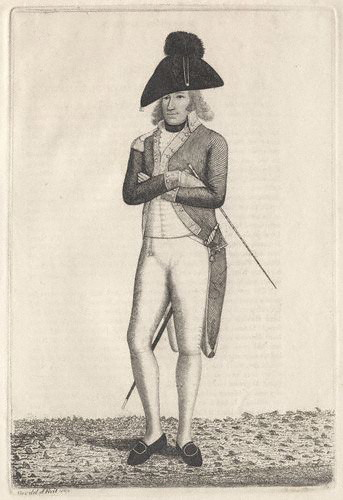
Military issue tail coat, 1789

From c. 1790 until after the Crimean War, a red tail coat with short tails, known as a coatee, was part of the infantry uniform of the British army. The collar and cuffs were in the regimental colors and the coats had white braid on the front. Elite light infantry units like the 95th Rifles were issued short green coats to provide camouflage and ease of movement.

The Americans issued a similar uniform in dark blue to enlisted men during the War of 1812. This remained in service until 1833 when it was replaced with a shell jacket. Officers continued to wear tail coats until after the Mexican War when frock coats became the standard field wear. By the time the M1858 uniform was introduced tail coats had been relegated to full dress.

The Royal Navy had an elaborate hierarchy of tailcoats for the officers, allowing further buttons and gilding according to rank and seniority. These were single-breasted for junior officers and double-breasted for those with the rank of lieutenant and above.

=== Highland coatee ===
This is worn with Highland dress, and has a square cut away front like a dress coat, but the tails are cut significantly shorter.

=== Footman's coat ===
This was worn as livery, a servant's uniform. It was knee length with a sloped cut-away front like a morning coat. It was single breasted with a stand-up collar and gilt buttons. There were three-pronged side pockets similar in style to the levée dress coat.

== Dress coat ==
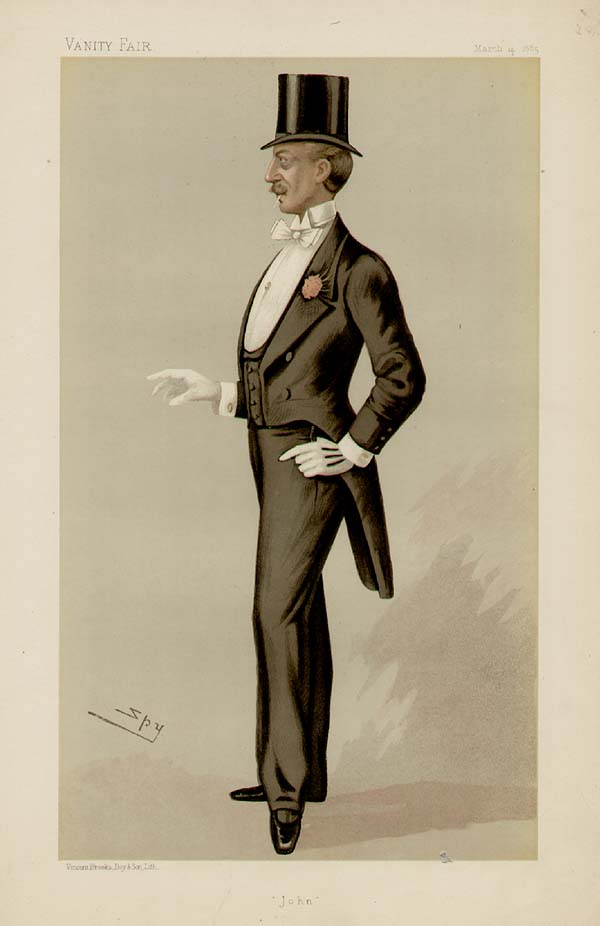
Caricature of Mr John Delacour (19th century) wearing dress coat with top hat for white tie

A dress coat, sometimes called a swallow-tail or claw-hammer coat, is the coat that has, since the 1850s, come to be worn only in the evening by men as part of the white tie dress code, also known as evening full dress, for formal evening occasions. It is commonly referred to as just a tailcoat in America, or tails in Great Britain, but amongst tailors (both British and American) and dress historians it is traditionally called a dress coat to differentiate it from other types of tailcoats.

The modern dress coat is an evolution of the coat that was once both day and evening dress. It became increasingly popular from around the late 1790s and was particularly widespread during the British Regency, and in America in the 1830s to 1850s. The dress coat was supplanted in the 1840s as formal day wear by the frock coat, which was in turn replaced in the early twentieth century by the morning coat. In the Regency period, the dress coat with gilt buttons was always worn with non-matching trousers, pantaloons or breeches. Since the Victorian era, the modern dress coat for evening wear has been worn with matching trousers of the same cloth with two stripes of braiding down the side. The resulting suit is traditionally referred to by tailors as a dress suit.

A dress coat is waist length in the front and sides, and has two long tails reaching to the knees in back. Sometimes there is a pocket on the inside to hold gloves. Since around the 1840s the dress coat has lacked outside side pockets, but prior to this it took flapped side pockets. Since the early twentieth century, it has become acceptable in America to have a welted pocket on the outside of the chest to hold a pocket square, but prior to this dress coats lacked any outer pockets. The front of the skirt is squarely cut away. Since around the 1830s the coat has been constructed with a waist seam that allows greater waist suppression. From the Victorian era, the revers has taken facings in silk (grosgrain or satin) on the lapels. Although it is double-breasted, since the 1870s, the dress coat no longer fastens in the front. As a result, although there are two rows of buttons, these are all non-functional, serving only a decorative function.

As part of modern white tie, a black dress coat is worn with a stiff, white wing-collar dress shirt, with a plain starched (pique or plain-weave) bib that takes shirt studs, single cuffs fastened with cufflinks (of a white metal); a matching white marcella cotton or satin silk bowtie and white waistcoat; black trousers with one or two silk galon; and black oxfords (without a toe cap) or pumps; the shoes must be polished to a mirror shine or be made of patent leather and are worn with black, over-the-calf silk socks. Additionally, a top hat, silk dress scarf, and white dress gloves are either seen as acceptable or mandatory. A gentleman's top hat was traditionally made of silk plush, although the last supplies of this material have now been exhausted, so inferior hats are made of silk or felt cloth.

== Morning coat ==
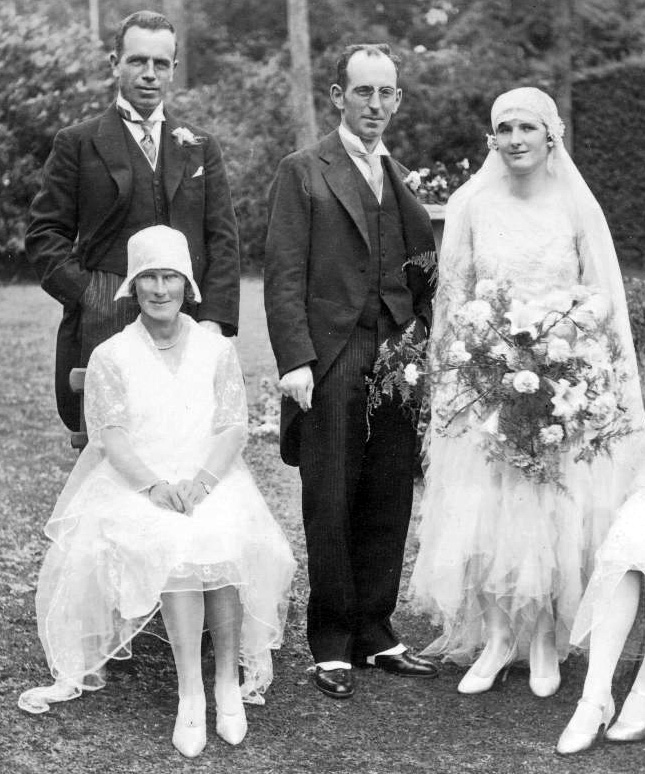
Two men wearing morning coats at a wedding. 1929

A morning coat is a single-breasted coat, with the front parts usually meeting at one button in the middle, and curving away gradually into a pair of tails behind, topped by two ornamental buttons on the waist seam. The lapels are usually pointed (American English peak), not step (notch), since the coat is now only worn as formalwear. When it was first introduced, the step lapel was common, since it was worn as half dress. The coat can be grey or black as part of morning dress, and is usually worn with striped, or very occasionally checked, trousers.

The morning coat may also be worn as part of a morning suit, which is mid-grey with matching trousers and waistcoat.

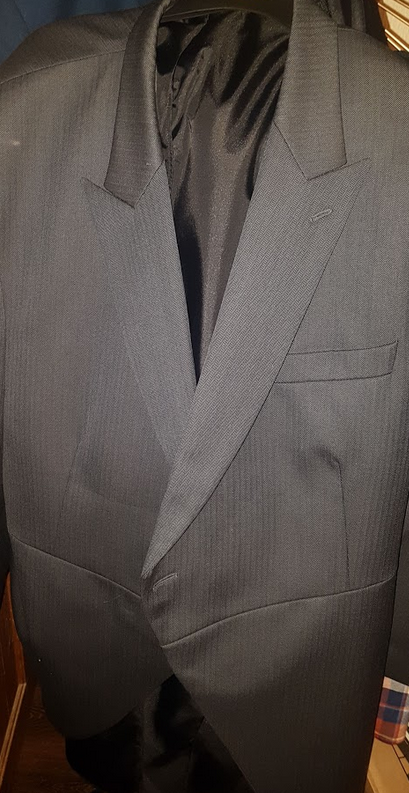
A modern traditional morning tailcoat, made of mohair

The modern morning coat (or cutaway in American English) is a man's coat worn as the principal item in morning dress. Historically, "cutaway" or "cut-away" coats (documented from 1823 onwards) could feature "tail pockets" in the tails.

The name "morning coat" derives from morning nineteenth-century horseback-riding exercise for gentlemen. The garment was regarded as an informal form of half dress. Gradually it became acceptable as an alternative to the frock coat for formal day-wear or full dress. Since the nineteenth century it is normally only seen at weddings, at formal baptisms, and (in England and Australia) at races such as Royal Ascot, the Derby and the Victoria Derby, where it is worn with a contrasting waistcoat, usually light grey or sometimes "fancy", and perhaps in club colours. It is very occasionally seen at funerals but more often it is used as day wear at formal luncheons, especially on civic occasions under formal gowns, when worn with a black matching waistcoat (vest). Male members of the cabinet of Japan wear morning coats in their first public appearance following the formation of the cabinet.

The Marshal and Clerk of the United States Supreme Court wear morning coats when the justices are appearing in public wearing their traditional robes, for example when the court is in session, or when attending the President's State of the Union address. At one time all attorneys appearing before the court wore morning coats, but they now wear standard business attire. The United States Solicitor General (when the office is held by a male) and his or her male deputies continue the tradition of wearing morning dress when arguing before the court.

In modern American English, morning coats are referred to as cutaway coats.
