= Dress boot =

Short leather boots

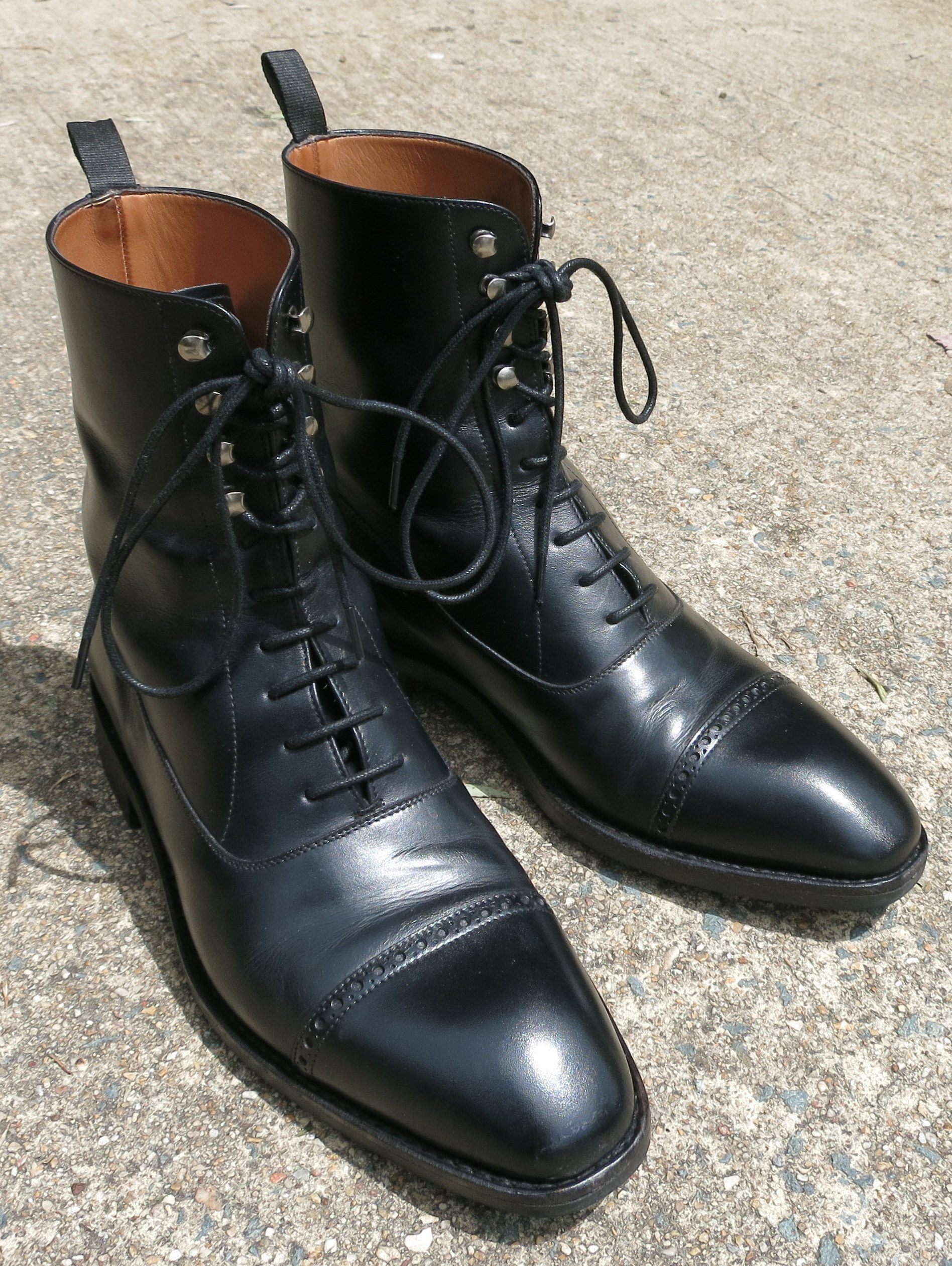
A pair of men's Balmoral boots

Dress boots are short leather boots typically worn by men. Built like dress shoes, but with uppers covering the ankle, versions of the boots are used as an alternative to these in bad weather or rough outdoor situations, and as a traditional option for day time formalwear.

== History ==
Until the Victorian period, long riding boots were common and dress boots were for more formal occasions, so patent leather was often used, as well as ordinary black calf. Gradually, these boots became more common for formal evening use, so that by the Edwardian era, patent boots were generally worn when there would be no dancing. Patent leather use during day dropped, and formal morning clothes soon incorporated either shoes or plain calf dress boots. In the evening, the wearing of both boots and court slippers similarly declined as shoes came to dominate, though slippers are still worn with white tie.

As the use of riding boots declined with the advent of cars (automobiles), another use for these short boots developed as tougher alternatives to shoes for harsh weather or terrain, where hobnails would originally have been worn with sturdier versions of town boots. Now that shoes are so much more common than boots, and formal clothing is worn so infrequently, this is now the most frequent use of dress boots.

== Form ==
=== Formal boots ===
With formalwear, dress boots are now only worn during the day, and are usually now black Oxford boots of Balmoral cut (in the English, not American, sense, i.e. the only seam descending to the welt is that of the toe-cap). The upper is usually softer, made of canvas or suede. However, this does not have to be the case as the upper can also be made of the same material as the vamp. Alternatively, the same Balmoral vamp is used with a button-fastened upper instead of using the more modern system of shoe laces. The tolerance for fit with this kind of boot is less, so they are more expensive, though more traditional, and a button-hook on the end of a shoehorn may be needed to do up the buttons. The traditional use of buff for the uppers is rare. The boots sometimes have toe-caps, which can feature a brogued seam, a reference to their original informal use for business.

=== Outdoor boots ===
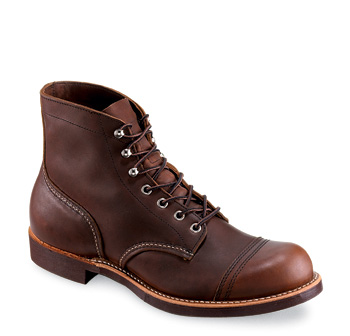
Modern outdoor boot

Although constructed similarly to formal boots, casual or informal boots for harsher conditions sacrifice elegance for practicality, using double leather soles, or even rubber ones. The uppers are made of the same strong leather as the vamp, and tougher materials like cordovan may be used. Walking boots in this style can have open lacing, and broguing is used as on country shoes. The main colour is brown. Boots of this design were issued to the British and US armies in the 19th century: the US Civil War-era Jeff Davis boots had hobnails and the British ammunition boots remained in service until World War II. More recently, boots of this style have seen a revival as part of the Neo-Edwardian fashion popular among British indie kids.

== See also ==
- List of boots
- List of shoe styles

== Bibliography ==
- Antongiavanni, Nicholas (2006). The Suit: A Machiavellian Approach to Men's Style. HarperCollins. ISBN 978-0-06-089186-2.
- Croonborg, Frederick (1907). The Blue Book of Men's Tailoring. New York and Chicago: Croonborg Sartorial Co.
