= R. L. Shep =

American author and publisher (1933–2022)

R. L. Shep (born Robert Lee "Robb" Shep; 27 February 1933 – December 21, 2022), was an American artist, writer, publisher, textile scholar, shiatsu practitioner and member of the Mendocino Healing Community. Shep is best known for his first book, Cleaning and Repairing Books: A Practical Home Manual, for his publications on textile arts, dress, and manners, and for his textile-related endowments.

== Early life and education ==
Robert Lee Shep was born in Los Angeles, California to Ruth and Milton Shep, the children of Russian Jewish émigrés.

In 1950, Shep graduated from Army and Navy Academy. He received a Bachelor of Arts in Dramatic Art from the University of California, Berkeley in 1955. Shep continued his education, first at the Royal Academy of Dramatic Art, London (1955–56), then at the American Institute of Foreign Trade, now Thunderbird School of Global Management, in Glendale, Arizona.

== Career ==
In 1965, Shep began to sell imported and out-of-print books on costume and textiles.

Shep first traveled to Nepal in 1978. In 1981, he took the helm of The Textile Booklist.

Between 1983 and 2004, Shep made several trips to Bhutan and Northeastern India; collecting and studying Bhutanese and Northeastern Indian Naga textiles. He particularly studied from the Maram Naga people, exploring design themes that remain consistent, persisting in the work even as traditions change over time. On his return to the United States, Shep devoted two issues of The Textile Booklist to Bhutan (Winter 1984 and Spring 1984) which included illustrated articles.

The Seattle Textile and Rug Society sponsored two presentations by Shep, the first (1999) focused on silks from Northeastern India, and the second, Naga textiles, as represented in the ikat collections of Shep and fellow textile scholar Irene Joshi.

Textiles from the Indian subcontinent and the Mekong Delta represent the core of the Shep collection, which includes some thirty Naga blankets or shawls dating from the late 1960s to the mid-1990s, representing textile development during that period. Other items in the collection date from the early 20th century. This collection was given to the Fowler Museum at UCLA.

At the end of 2004, most of the balance of R. L. Shep's collection of antique and contemporary hand-loomed textiles was given to the Mingei Museum in San Diego, with some of the Shep collection going to the Henry Art Gallery, at the University of Washington.

== Professional affiliations ==
R. L. Shep is an honorary member of the Textile Society of America. He served on the Costume Society of America's national board of directors from 1985 to 1987.

Other past professional affiliations include the United States Institute for Theatre Technology, the Seattle Textile and Rug Society, Pacific Textile Arts, the Costume Society of Ontario, The Costume Society of Great Britain, and the Australian Forum for Textile Art, Ltd..

== Publications ==
In addition to writing Cleaning and Repairing Books, R. L. Shep published books on textile arts, dress, and manners, which archived information from the late 18th century through the early 20th century, in the United States and Great Britain, as resources for theatre. All of those were edited by R.L Shep; some were compendiums of related works, and many included Shep's own notes and articles. According to Shep, his interest in reprinting technical textile books from the 19th century started with the discovery of a copy of Louis Devere's "The Handbook of Practical Cutting on the Centre Point System" and was encouraged by his mentor, New York costumer and clothing pattern archivist Betty Vickery Williams.

- Shep, R.L. (1980). Cleaning and Repairing Books: A Practical Home Manual. Lopez Island: R.L. Shep. ISBN 978-0-914046-00-4.
- Stanley Egerton Wilton, Mary Margaret (1986) [1846]. Shep, R.L. (ed.). The Book of Costume or Annals of Fashion. Lopez Island: R.L. Shep. ISBN 978-0-914046-04-2.
- Frost, Annie (1986) [1877]. Shep, R.L. (ed.). The Ladies' Guide to Needlework : Being a Complete Guide to All Types of Ladies' Fancy Work. Lopez Island: R.L. Shep. ISBN 978-0-914046-02-8.
- Devere, Louis (1986) [1866]. Shep, R.L. (ed.). The Handbook of Practical Cutting on the Centre Point System. Mendocino: R.L. Shep. ISBN 0-914046-03-9.
- Giles, Edward B (1987). The Art of Cutting and History of English Costume. Lopeza Island: R.L. Shep. ISBN 978-0-914046-05-9.
- Martine, Arthur; Godfrey Leland, Charles (1988) [1864, 1866]. Civil War Etiquette: Martine's Handbook & Vulgarisms in Conversation. Mendocino: R.L. Shep. ISBN 0-914046-07-1.
- Shep, R.L., ed. (1988) [1853]. Ladies' self-instructor in Millinery & Mantua Making, Embroidery & Applique. Mendocino: R.L. Shep. ISBN 0-914046-08-X.
- Campbell, Mark (1989) [?]. Shep, R.L. (ed.). Civil War Ladies: Fashions and Needle-Arts of the Early 1860s. Mendocino: R.L. Shep. ISBN 0-914046-09-8.
- Hopkins, J.C. (1990) [1910]. Shep, R.L. (ed.). Edwardian Ladies' Tailoring : The Twentieth Century System of Ladies' Garment Cutting. Mendocino: R.L. Shep. ISBN 978-0-914046-10-3.
- Hartley, Florence (1991) [1859]. Ladies' Handbook of Fancy & Ornamental Work - Civil War Era. Mendocino: R.L. Shep. ISBN 0-914046-13-6.
- Vincent, W.D.F. (1991) [1903]. Shep, R.L.; Williams, Betty (eds.). Tailoring of the Belle Epoque : Vincent's Systems of Cutting All Kinds of Tailor-made Garments. Mendocino: R.L. Shep. ISBN 0-914046-11-X.
- Wyatt, J.; Le Blanc, H. (1991) [1822,1828]. Shep, R.L. (ed.). Late Georgian Costume. Mendocino: R.L. Shep. ISBN 978-0-914046-12-7.
- Ben-Yusuf, Anna (1992) [1909]. Shep, R.L. (ed.). Edwardian hats: The Art of Millinery. Mendocino: R.L. Shep. ISBN 0-914046-15-2.
- Haskell, E.F. (1992) [1861]. Shep, R.L. (ed.). Civil War Cooking: The Housekeeper's Encyclopedia. Mendocino: R.L. Shep. ISBN 0-914046-16-0.
- Clement Brown, P. (1993) [1922]. Art in Dress. Mendocino: R.L. Shep. ISBN 0-914046-19-5.
- Minister, Edward (1993) [1853]. Shep, R.L. (ed.). The Complete Guide to Practical Cutting. Mendocino: R.L. Shep. ISBN 0-914046-17-9.
- Shep, R.L. (1993). Corsets: A Visual History. Mendocino: R.L. Shep. ISBN 0-914046-20-9.
- Lord, William Berry (1993) [1868]. Shep, R.L. (ed.). Freaks of fashion: The Corset and the Crinoline. Mendocino: R.L. Shep. ISBN 978-0-914046-18-9.
- Salisbury, W.S. (1994) [1865]. Shep, R.L.; Dervis, Peter; Williams, Betty (eds.). Civil War Gentlemen: 1860s Apparel Arts & Uniforms. Mendocino: R.L. Shep. ISBN 0-914046-22-5.
- Shep, R.L., ed. (1994) [1889]. Victorian Needle-craft: Artistic & Practical. Mendocino: R.L. Shep. ISBN 0-914046-21-7.
- Holding, Thomas Hiram (1997) [1897]. Shep, R.L. (ed.). Late Victorian Women's Tailoring: The Direct System of Ladies' Cutting. Mendocino: R.L. Shep. ISBN 0-914046-23-3.
- Regency Etiquette : The Mirror of Graces. Mendocino: R.L. Shep. 1997 [1811]. ISBN 0-914046-24-1.
- Queen, James; Lapsley, William (1998) [1796, 1809]. Shep, R.L. (ed.). Federalist & Regency Costume, 1790-1819. Mendocino: R.L. Shep. ISBN 0-914046-25-X.
- Shep, R.L. (1998). The great war: Styles and patterns of the 1910s. Fort Bragg: R.L. Shep. ISBN 0-914046-26-8.
- Shep, R.L.; Cariou, Greg (1999). Shirts & Men's Haberdashery : 1840s to 1920s; a Rribute to Betty Williams. Mendocino: R.L. Shep. ISBN 0-914046-27-6.
- Walker, George (2001) [1833]. Shep, R.L.; William, Charles; Uzanne, Octave; et al. (eds.). Early Victorian men: The Tailor's Masterpiece, All Kinds of Coats. Fort Bragg: R.L. Shep. ISBN 0-914046-28-4.
- Hecklinger, Charles (2002) [1880,1883]. Shep, R.L. (ed.). Women's costume 1877-1885: The Complete Dress and Cloak Cutter. Fort Bragg: R.L. Shep. ISBN 0-914046-29-2.
- Croonborg, Frederick T. (2005) [1907]. The blue book of men's tailoring. Fort Bragg: R.L. Shep. ISBN 0-914046-30-6.

== Periodicals ==
In 1981 R.L. Shep purchased The Textile Booklist, a longstanding quarterly primarily devoted to lists of books on industrial textiles. He retained the industrial textile listings, but expanded coverage to include lists of new titles on costume and textile arts, adding reviews of some titles, and original articles on related subjects. At the end of 1984, Shep sold the Textile Booklist, which continued for several years under new ownership. From 1996 to 1997, Shep published and edited Rags: Quarterly Review of Costume, Clothing & Ethnic Textile Books, which offered in-depth reviews by textile professionals.

== Endowments ==
R. L. Shep's endowments include a triennial symposium on textiles and dress at the Los Angeles County Museum of Art (LACMA), an annual ethnic textiles book award through the Textile Society of America (TSA), and an endowment at the UCLA Fowler Museum of Cultural History.

In 1998, Shep founded the Triennial R. L. Shep Symposium of Textiles and Dress at LACMA. The first symposium, Dress as Transformation: Creating Experience in Theater and Masquerade, was held in April 1999. The second symposium, Miracles & Mischief: Noh and Kyogen Theater in Japan was held in December 2002, the first of the symposiums to be held in association with an exhibit and catalog. The third symposium, 17th Century Textiles & Dress, was held on 9 April 2005 in association with the exhibit Images of Fashion from the Court of Louis XIV. The fourth symposium, Talking Cloth – New Studies on Indonesian Textiles, was held on 18 October 2008 in association with the exhibit Five Centuries of Indonesian Textiles: Selections from the Mary Hunt Kahlenberg Collection and catalog It gave participants a "rare opportunity to scrutinize remarkable textiles from India and to reevaluate issues relating to the methodology of the field".

The fifth symposium, Fashioning a Collection: Vision and Viewpoints, was held on 15 January 2011 in association with the exhibit Fashioning Fashion: European Dress in Detail, 1700–1915, with an exhibition catalog by LACMA Senior Curator and Head, Costume and Textiles Department, Sharon S. Takeda, and Kaye Durland Spilker, Curator, Costume and Textiles Department at LACMA.

Since 2000, the annual R. L. Shep Ethnic Textiles Book Award has honored a book in Ethnic Textile studies. The "esteemed" award is a $750 prize funded by an endowment established by R. L. Shep in 2000. It is administered by the Textile Society of America (TSA). The first winner was Otag-I Humayun: The Ottoman Imperial Tent Complex by Nurhan Atasoy.

Since 2003, the R. L. Shep Endowment at the UCLA Fowler Museum of Cultural History has supported exhibitions, and publication of the related catalogs. For example, in 2006, the Fowler used Shep Endowment funding for the exhibition Material Choices: Refashioning Bast and Leaf Fibers in Asia and the Pacific and its catalog, which also received the R. L. Shep Ethnic Textiles Book Award in 2007.

In 2010 the R. L. Shep Endowment provided funding for a book and three major exhibits at the Fowler. The first exhibition was Meet Me at the Center of the Earth by textile and performance artist Nick Cave. Also in 2010, Weavers’ Stories from Island Southeast Asia presented videos of weavers and batik artists from Indonesia, Malaysia, the Philippines, and East Timor, talking about social and economic change, and its relation to the artists' individual artistic choices. The videos were accompanied by textiles created by the artists especially for the exhibit. The third project supported by the Shep Endowment in 2010 was the publication of a book, Nini Towok's Spinning Wheel: Cloth and the Cycle of Life in Kerek, Java by Rens Heringa, and the concurrent presentation of an exhibit of the same name.
