= Justacorps =

17th century knee-length coat

A justacorps or justaucorps (/ˈʒuːstəkɔːr/) is a knee-length coat worn by men in the latter half of the 17th century and throughout the 18th century. It is of French origin, where it had developed from a cape-like garment called a casaque. It was introduced into England as a component of a three-piece ensemble, which also included breeches and a long vest or waistcoat. This ensemble served as the prototype for the modern-day three-piece suit. The justacorps itself evolved into the frock coat.

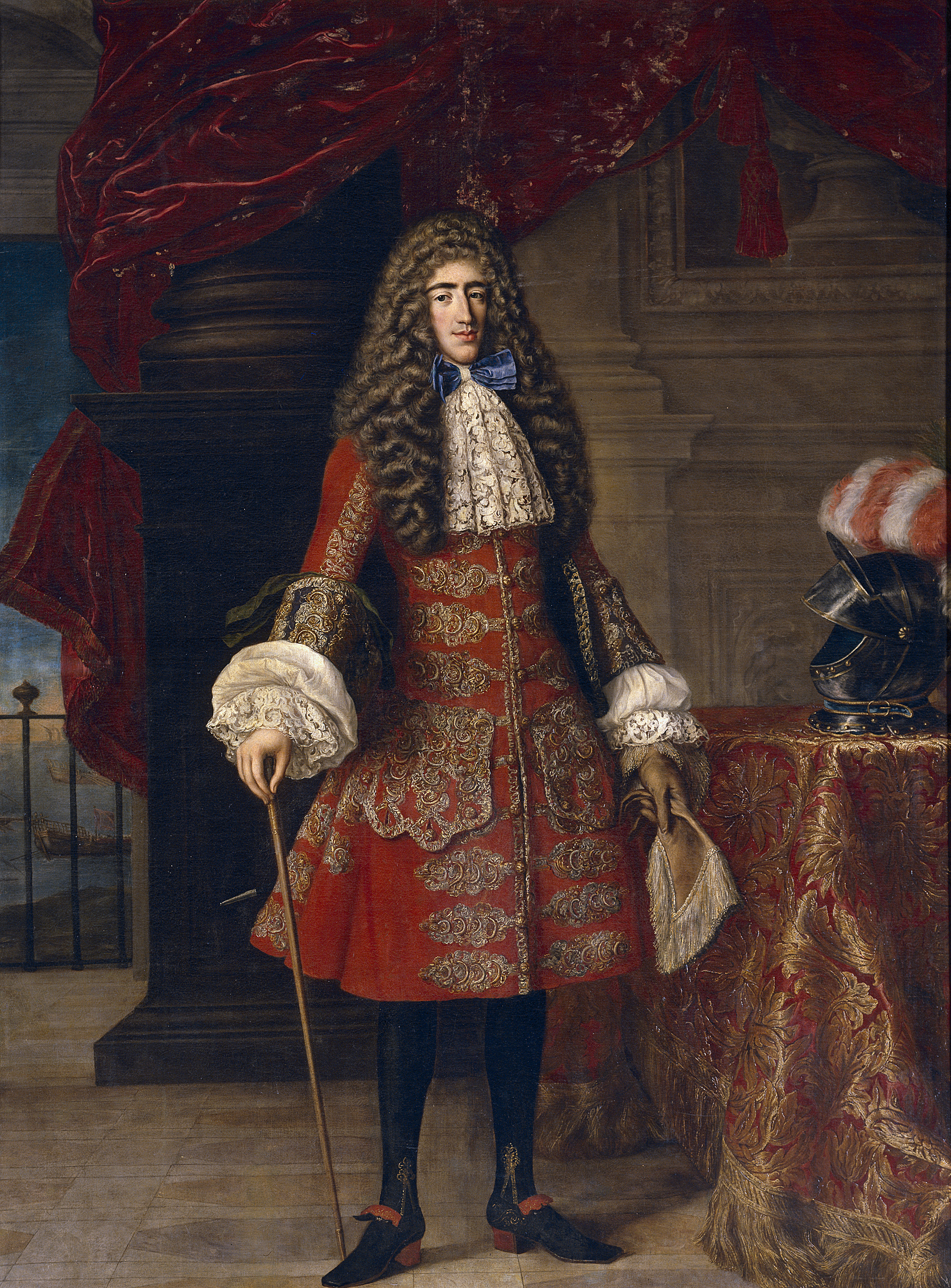
Luis Francisco de la Cerda (later Duke of Medinaceli) in a red justacorps with horizontal pockets and lavish decoration, c. 1684.

The fabric selection and styling of the justacorps varied over time, as fashions altered through history. Elaborated forms featuring rich embroidery and embellishments were influenced by Indo-Persian and Turkish garments, which cultures influential Europeans were increasingly in contact with, through travel, trade, and diplomatic missions. East European garments of similar cut became fashionable around the same time as the justacorp arrived in Western Europe, and its construction and decoration were also influenced by "oriental" modes.

== Origins ==
The casaque, a voluminous travellers' cloak, became popular during Louis XIII's time for protection from the elements. It had evolved from the simple smock and now had separate front, back and shoulder pieces so that could be worn as a semicircular cape or, with simple adjustments, as a jacket. While adaptable in general use, and a mainstay of the military wardrobe, from the mid-17th century developments in weaponry meant the casaque was now proving too cumbersome as soldiers' clothing, its bulk impeding easy access to their weapons. A redesigned version was given a more fitted cut, from which it acquired a new descriptive name just-au-corps, lit. 'just to the body', and a full-length central front opening with button fastenings. This practical military garment with enhanced freedom of movement, went on to be elaborated into a style of coat that became popular with civilians. Its success outside the military was greatly aided by Louis XIV's promotion of it.

== Context and parallels ==
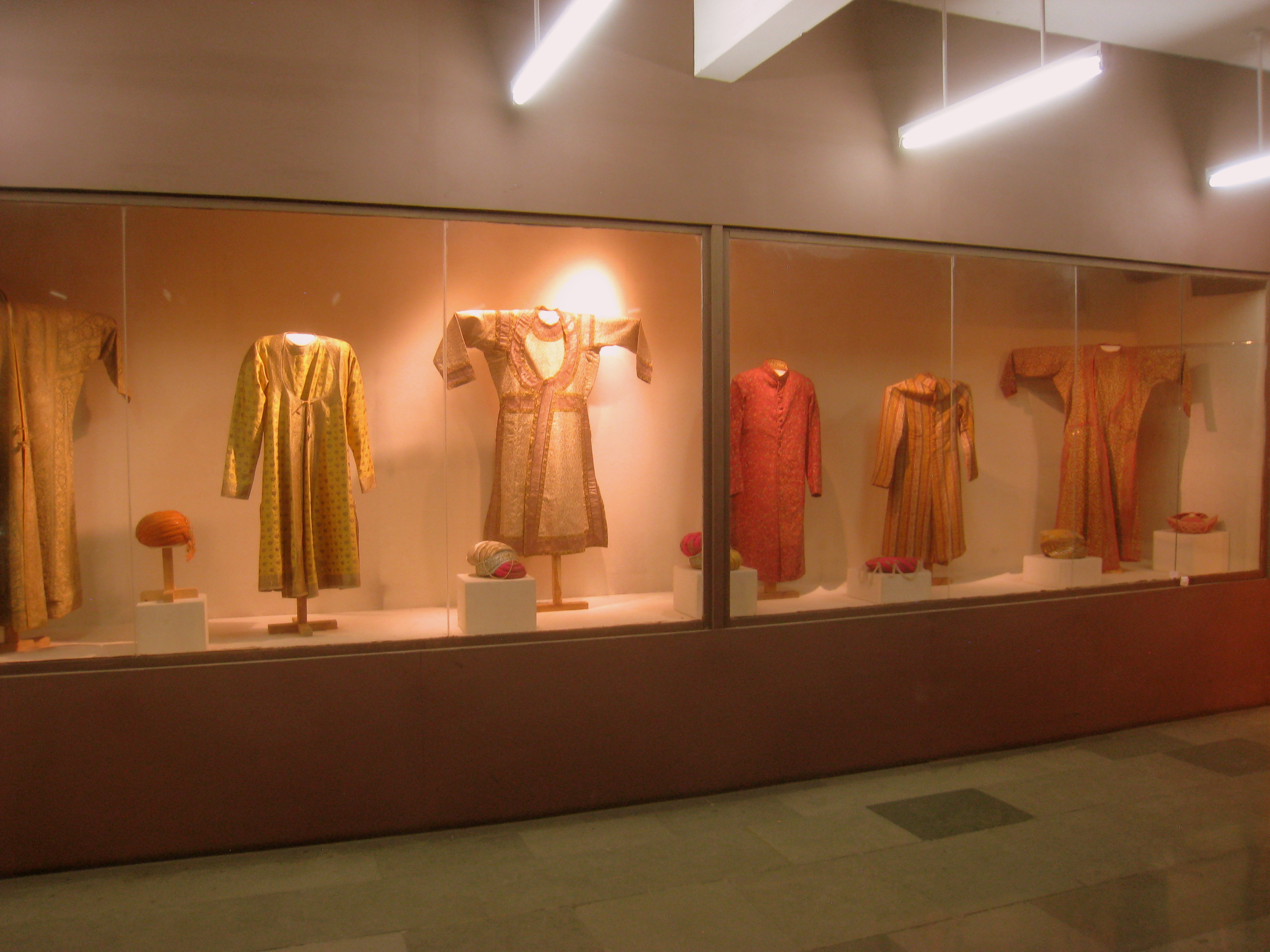
Display of various styles of achkan and angarkha worn by men, Delhi textile museum.

The justaucorps, according to historians Yarwood, de Marly, Laver, Fraser, and Mokhberi, was influenced by a similar Persian coat, which also featured floral embroidery and tight-fitting body and sleeves. Similar Persian-influenced coats such as the angarkha had been worn in India for centuries, and could be either sleeved or sleeveless. Variations of these were often worn by wealthy travellers who visited India or "the East" during the early 1600s; some returned with them to Europe. On occasion, portraits of the returned travellers in their "exotic" garb were painted (for example, of the 1st Earl Of Denbigh (c. 1632), by van Dyck). When King Charles II of England adopted the justacorps, it was interpreted as inspired by Persian costume.

A garment that came into fashion in Poland and Hungary at the same time was the żupan or dolman with its distinctive turn-back cuffs and decorative gold braid. The żupan started out as a long and heavy winter gown before becoming shorter and more fitted during the 16th century. These Polish garments (kontusz and żupan) were also based on Turkish/oriental influences, due to the Polish cultural ideology of Sarmatism. "Turkish style" long coats influenced the design of the justacorps later favored by Louis XIV of France due to their exotic appearance and associations with Oriental power and authority.

== Development ==
=== In France ===
The spread of the justacorps throughout the French army was accelerated by Louis XIV's military reforms which included standardised uniforms for the first time. Worn in regimental colours, the justacorp was an essential element of the new uniforms. By 1660, the garment, made in luxurious fabrics and ornamented lavishly was standard wear in the French court. Louis instituted an intricate and regulated system of ceremonial and court dress, under which his courtiers vied with one another in the splendour of their attire, and the approval of king. From 1662 Louis created the justaucorps à brevet ('warrant justacorps'), to an exclusive design, changed annually. As the Persian rulers had done with their native garment, King Louis XIV bestowed this special garment upon key subjects as an emblem of his favour. Strictly limited in number, the nobles awarded it had privileged access to the king. In this way the justacorps came to be associated with absolutism in France, highlighting links and commonalities between the Safavid and Bourbon absolutist regimes. Such perceptions contributed the rapid evolution of the justacorp to the plainer, more streamlined coats that appeared in the wake of the French Revolution.

Despite sumptuary laws aimed at restricting the bourgeois wear of prestige fabrics and garments, growing wealth in the mercantile sector gave non-aristocrats the means to clothe themselves luxuriously. The king and his court set the fashions, while attempts to keep them exclusive to the nobility met with limited success. Wealthy merchants adopted justacorps in ornate styles and fine fabrics; over the 18th century the justacorps became the standard outer garment for men in France, persisting until the French Revolution. A shorter form of the justacorps, together with culottes, veste and cravat became so much the norm it was called habit à la française.

=== In Britain ===
Under King Charles II of England a plainer, more sober take on the earlier but similarly-cut justaucorps, veste and culottes outfit which had been imposed by King Louis XIV in the French court was also introduced to England. In 1666, Charles had made a deliberate effort to differentiate men's fashions in England from those of France, which up to then had been the major influence in the English court and fashionable society. He declared a new garment, referred to as a vest or waistcoat, to be the appropriate garment for gentlemen. The vest was knee-length, worn in conjunction with breeches and an overcoat of equal length. This outfit is considered to be the prototype of the modern-day men's three-piece suit.

The justacorps was a short-lived trend upon Charles' initial introduction of it, lasting only six years. The king and his court gradually became more closely influenced by French fashions from around 1670 and from there French fashion spread to the English public. As a popular component of the Englishman's dress, the justacorps did not establish itself until around 1680, when the French style was reintroduced.

In Scotland there were two similar garments: the "jeistiecor" (a jacket; a waistcoat with sleeves) and the "justicoat" or "justiecor" (a sleeved waistcoat).

== 17th century ==
It replaced the doublet, a previously popular shorter style of coat. In the 17th century the justacorps was worn to the knee, covering an equal length vest and breeches underneath. It opened center front, typically having many buttons and buttonholes lining the entire length of the opening. The sleeves were fitted, and featured deep cuffs. Some styles of the justacorps remained fitted throughout the bodice, though other versions feature a more accentuated, flared skirt through the addition of gores and pleats. Justacorps also featured decorative pockets, often placed too low for the wearer to take functional advantage. Worn primarily by aristocratic, wealthy men, justacorps were very ornate in design and made of luxurious fabrics. Colourful silk, satin, brocade, damask, and wool were commonly used textiles. Justacorps often were accented with contrasting fabrics of different colours and patterns, displayed through turned back cuffs or a decorative sash worn across the shoulders. By the early 18th century, the silhouette of the justacorps had become wider, with a fuller skirt, and laid the foundation for men's fashion throughout the rest of the century.

== 18th century ==
In the first half of the 18th century, the justacorps altered in appearance. The garment's opening remained at center front, however the buttons only extended to the waist area, allowing extra room for the extension of a fuller skirt. The cuffs became tighter and no longer folded back, and pockets were functional, located at a more accessible, hip-level region. The opening of the justacorps was rounded towards the mid chest, and flared away from the body.

In the second half of the 18th century, the justacorps skirt decreased in fullness, becoming narrower. A straight edge, similar to 17th-century-style openings, replaced the rounded opening of the coat, and sleeves reverted to a deep, turned back cuff. Textiles for the justacorps varied by use. Durable fabrics, like wool, were used in ordinary, everyday situations, and typically had less ornamentation compared to ones worn in elegant, formal settings. These coats were made of ornate fabrics like silk and brocade, and decorated with elaborate embroidery and lace.

The justacorps should be distinguished as different from the frock coat, which was less ornate, differed in cut and silhouette, and not worn popularly until the late 18th century.

== See also ==
- 1650–1700 in fashion
- 1700–1750 in fashion
