= Stresemann =

Stresemann is a German family name which may refer to:

- Christina Stresemann (born 1957), German judge; daughter of Wolfgang Stresemann
- Erwin Stresemann (1889–1972), German ornithologist
- Gustav Stresemann (1878–1929), German politician and statesman
  - Gustav Stresemann Business School, Mainz, Germany
- Käte Stresemann (1883–1970), socialite and wife of Gustav Stresemann
- Wolfgang Stresemann (1904–1998), German jurist, conductor and composer; son of Gustav Stresemann

Stresemann is also the German name for the stroller suit, named after Gustav Stresemann.
