= Stresemann (film) =

1957 film

- Directed by: Alfred Braun
- Written by: Heinz Hajo; Ludwig Berger; Curt J. Braun; Axel Eggebrecht
- Produced by: Heinrich Jonen
- Starring: Ernst Schroder; Leonard Steckel; Anouk Aimée
- Cinematography: Friedl Behn-Grund
- Edited by: Kurt Zeunert
- Music by: Boris Blacher
- Production company: Meteor-Film
- Distributed by: Prisma Film
- Release date: 11 January 1957
- Running time: 105 minutes
- Country: West Germany
- Language: German

Stresemann is a 1957 West German drama film directed by Alfred Braun and starring Ernst Schroder, Leonard Steckel and Anouk Aimée. It portrays the career of the German Minister for Foreign Affairs Gustav Stresemann in the 1920s.

The film's art direction was by Otto Erdmann and Wilhelm Vorwerg.

== Cast ==
- Ernst Schröder as Dr. Gustav Stresemann
- Leonard Steckel as Aristide Briand
- Anouk Aimée as Annette Stein
- Wolfgang Preiss as Heinz Becker
- Susanne von Almassy as Käte Stresemann
- Jürgen Wölffer as Wolfgang Stresemann
- Wolf Harnisch as Bernhard, Stresemann's secretary
- Siegfried Schürenberg as Lord d'Abernon
- Paul Dahlke as President Friedrich Ebert
- Wolfgang Kühne as Haguenin
- Paul Wagner as Winkelmann
- Ernst Stahl-Nachbaur as Stresemann's Doctor
- Erwin Kalser as Raymond Poincaré
- O.A. Buck as Hesnard
- Fritz Eberth
- Hans Emons
- Gerhard Haselbach as Löbe
- Rolf Kestin
- Tilly Lauenstein
- Stanislav Ledinek as Monsieur Leger
- Artur Malkowsky as Hindenburg
- Otto Matthies
- Erich Poremski as Von Schubert
- Horst Rienitz
- Siegmar Schneider as Sir Austen Chamberlain
- Walter Tappe
- Otz Tollen as Gen. von Seeckt
- Alexa von Porembsky as Mme. Leger
- Herbert Wilk as Dr. Breitscheid

== Bibliography ==
- Hake, Sabine (2004). Film in Deutschland: Geschichte und Geschichten seit 1895. Reinbek: Rowohlt Taschenbuch Verlag. ISBN 978-3-499-55663-0.
