= Waldfriedhof Dahlem =

Cemetery in Berlin, Germany

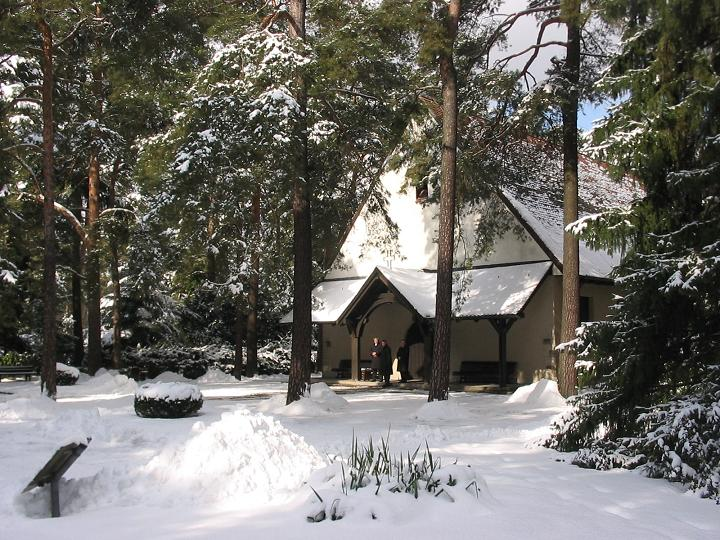
- Waldfriedhof chapel
- Interactive map of Waldfriedhof Dahlem

Details
- Established: 1933
- Location: Steglitz-Zehlendorf, Berlin
- Country: Germany
- Coordinates: 52.456°N 13.264°E
- Size: 75,407 m^{2}
- No. of graves: 40,000

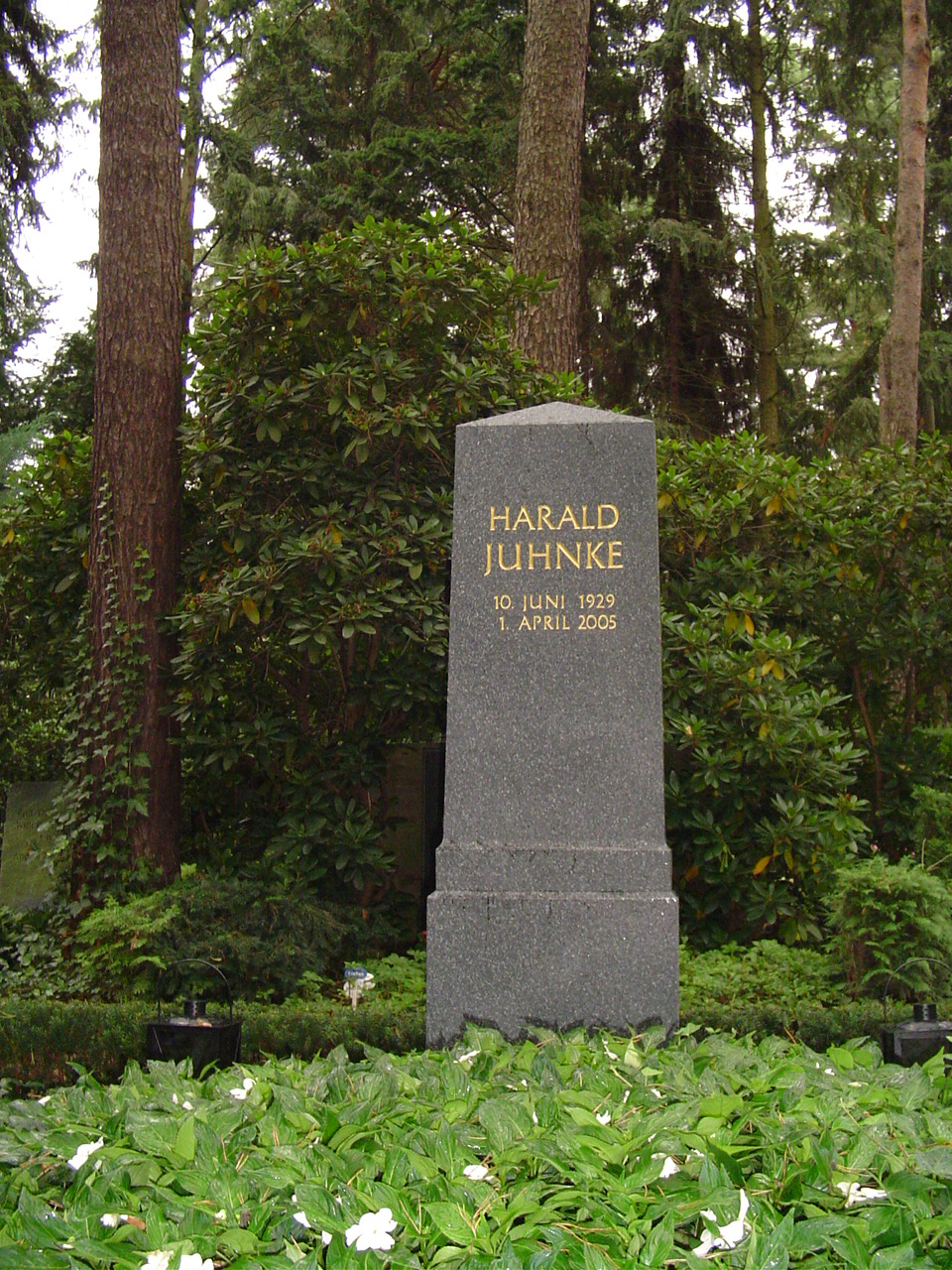
Grave of Harald Juhnke

The Waldfriedhof Dahlem (Dahlem forest cemetery) is a cemetery in Berlin, in the district of Steglitz-Zehlendorf on the edge of the Grunewald forest at Hüttenweg 47. Densely planted with conifers and designed between 1931 and 1933 after the plans of Albert Brodersen, it is one of Berlin's more recent cemeteries. Its graves include those of writers such as Gottfried Benn, composers such as Wolfgang Werner Eisbrenner and entertainers like Harald Juhnke, and put it among the so-called "Prominentenfriedhöfe" or celebrity cemeteries.

== Graves of notable people ==
- Karl Anton (1898–1979), film director and film producer
- Michael Ballhaus (1935–2017), cinematographer
- Antoinette Becker (1920–1998), writer
- Carl Heinrich Becker (1876–1933), orientalist and politician
- Gottfried Benn (1886–1956), poet
- Heinz Berggruen (1914–2007), art collector
- Frank Michael Beyer (1928–2008), composer
- Hans-Otto Borgmann (1901–1977), film composer
- Bully Buhlan (1924–1982), singer, actor
- Carl Correns (1864–1933), botanist
- Ernst von Delius (1912–1937), racecar driver
- Alexander Dinghas (1908–1974), mathematician
- Franz Dischinger (1887–1953), civil and structural engineer
- Blandine Ebinger (1899–1993), actress and chansonnière
- Karin Eickelbaum (1937–2004), actress
- Carl Otto von Eicken (1873–1960), physician
- Adolf Erman (1854–1937), Egyptologist and lexicographer
- Wolfgang Werner Eisbrenner (1908–1981), composer and conductor
- Friedrich Fedde (1873–1942), botanist
- Curth Flatow (1920–2011), dramatist and screenwriter
- Ernst Fraenkel (1898–1975), political scientist
- Roland Freisler (1893–1945), notorious chief judge of the Nazi People's Court. He is buried in his wife's family plot in an unmarked grave. Ironically, one of his victims, Ulrich Wilhelm Graf Schwerin von Schwanenfeld (see below), is also buried in the cemetery.
- Ludwig Fulda (1862–1939), playwright and translator
- Klaus Gysi (1912–1999), politician
- Ernst Hartert (1859–1933), ornithologist
- O.E. Hasse (1903–1978), actor
- Heinz Hentschke (1895–1970), actor, director and librettist
- Günter Herlitz (1913–2010), businessman (Herlitz stationery company)
- Klaus Höhne (1927–2006), actor
- Carl Hofer (1878–1955), painter
- Helene Jacobs (1906–1993), resister
- La Jana (1905–1940), dancer and actress
- Werner Janensch (1878–1969), paleontologist and geologist
- Harald Juhnke (1929–2005), actor and entertainer
- Josef Paul Kleihues (1933–2004), architect
- Friedrich Wilhelm Kopsch (1868–1955), anatomist
- Hilde Körber (1906–1969), actress
- Hans Christian Korting (1952–2012), dermatologist and medical researcher
- Robert H. Lochner (1918–2003), journalist
- Bobby E. Lüthge (1891–1964), screenwriter
- Wolfgang Lukschy (1905–1983), actor
- Marie-Elisabeth Lüders (1878–1966), politician
- Leny Marenbach (1907–1984), actress
- Arnold Marquis (1921–1990), actor
- Erich Mühsam (1878–1934), author and anarchist, murdered in Oranienburg concentration camp
- Zenzl Mühsam (1884–1962), anarchist
- Rudolf Nelson (1878–1960), composer and theatre director
- Hermann Noack (1895–1958), Art and bronze caster; gravestone with relief tablet based on a model by Ernst Barlach
- Bernd Rosemeyer (1909–1938), racecar driver, with his wife Elly Beinhorn, aviator
- Heinrich Sahm (1877–1939), mayor of Berlin and administrator of Free State of Danzig
- Günter Schabowski (1929–2015), politician of East Germany whose mistaken answer lead to the fall of the Berlin Wall.
- Wolfgang Schleif (1912–1984), film director
- Karl Schmidt-Rottluff* (1884–1976), painter
- Walther Schreiber (1884–1958), mayor of West Berlin
- Franz Schreker* (1878–1934), composer
- Ulrich Wilhelm Graf Schwerin von Schwanenfeld (1902–1944), resister
- Renée Sintenis* (1888–1965), sculptor
- Werner Sombart* (1863–1941), sociologist
- Camilla Spira (1906–1997), actress
- Herbert Stass (1919–1999), actor
- Ilse Steppat (1917–1969), actress
- Ivan Stranski (1897–1979), Bulgarian physical chemist
- Käte Stresemann (1883–1970), wife of the German Chancellor, Foreign Minister and Nobel Peace Prize laureate Gustav Stresemann
- Erwin Stresemann* (1889–1972), zoologist
- Wolfgang Stresemann* (1904–1998), conductor and composer
- Wilhelm Tank (1888–1967), painter
- Georg Tappert (1880–1957), painter
- Günter Tembrock (1918–2011), zoologist
- Heinrich Tessenow* (1876–1950), architect
- Ilse Trautschold (1906–1991), actress and comedian
- Kurt Ulrich (1905–1967), film producer
- Alfred Vohrer (1914–1986), film director
- Fritz Arno Wagner (1884–1958), cinematographer
- William Wauer* (1866–1962), sculptor and film director
- Richard von Weizsäcker (1920–2015), politician, president
- Sybil Werden (1924–2007), actress and dancer
- Theodor Wiegand (1864–1936), archaeologist
- Heinz-Günter Wittmann (1927–1990), biochemist
- Jürgen Wolters (1940–2015), professor of econometrics
- Johannes Würtz (1875–1958), founder of the Behindertenpädagogik (exact location of grave is unknown)

== Bibliography ==
- Hannelore Prüfer, Der Berliner Gartendirektor Albert Brodersen (1857–1930), in: Berlinische Monatsschrift, Heft 10/1997, Seiten 77/78 online at Edition Luisenstadt
- Klaus Hammer: Historische Friedhöfe & Grabmäler in Berlin, Stattbuch Verlag Berlin 1994, ISBN 3-922778-32-1
