= Hans Bernd von Haeften =

German jurist (1905–1944)

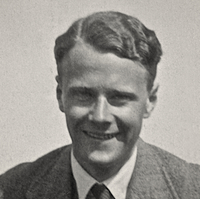
- Born: 18 December 1905; Berlin, German Empire
- Died: 15 August 1944 (aged 38); Plötzensee Prison, Berlin, Nazi Germany
- Cause of death: Execution by hanging
- Occupation: Diplomat
- Known for: German Resistance

Hans Bernd von Haeften (18 December 1905 – 15 August 1944) was a German jurist during the Nazi era. A member of the German Resistance against Adolf Hitler, he was arrested and executed in the aftermath of the failed 20 July plot.

== Biography ==
Haeften was born in Berlin, the son of Hans von Haeften (1870–1937), an army officer and President of the Reichsarchiv, and his wife the former Agnes von Brauchitsch (1869–1945), a relation of Walther von Brauchitsch. His siblings were Elisabeth (1903–1980) and Werner (1908–1944). He passed his Abitur in 1924 in Berlin-Wilmersdorf and then studied law, which took him as an exchange student to the University of Cambridge.

He married Barbara Curtius (1908–2006), daughter of Julius Curtius, on 2 September 1930. The couple had five children: Jan, Dirk, Verena, Dorothea, and Ulrike.

After University, he worked for the Stresemann Foundation and then in 1933 joined the Foreign Service. He worked mainly for the cultural-political department of the Foreign Office and as a cultural attaché in Copenhagen, Vienna, and Bucharest.

== During the rise of the Nazi Party ==
In 1940, Haeften became the department's leader, but refused to join the Nazi Party. From 1933, he belonged to the Confessing Church. He had contacts with the Kreisau Circle, especially through Ulrich von Hassell and Adam von Trott zu Solz. He refused on religious and moral grounds to have anything to do with any attempt on Adolf Hitler's life, but supported the attempt to overthrow Hitler and stood ready to take power at the Foreign Ministry for the plotters. In January 1944 he stopped his brother, Lieutenant Werner von Haeften, from shooting Hitler with a pistol with the argument that this would break the Fifth Commandment.

== Arrest ==
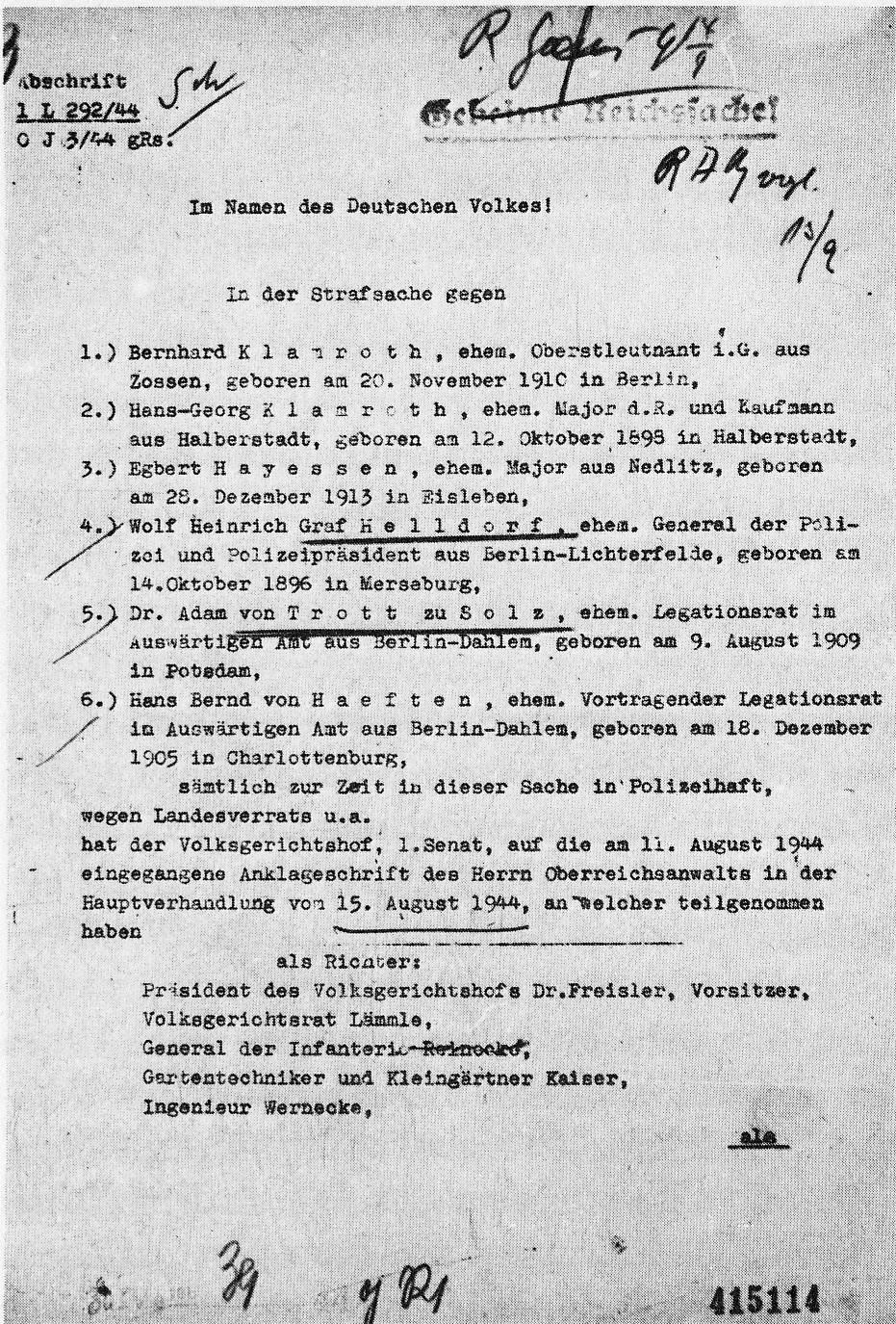
Criminal case against Haeften in the German People's Court, presided by Judge Roland Freisler

Haeften was arrested on 23 July 1944, three days after the 20 July Plot, the German military's failed assassination attempt against Hitler at the Wolfsschanze in East Prussia. His brother Lieutenant Werner von Haeften, who was the adjutant of Colonel Claus Schenk Graf von Stauffenberg, had been summarily shot along with Stauffenberg in the early hours of 21 July at the Bendlerblock. On 15 August, Haeften was brought before the Volksgerichtshof, or People's Court, and accused of treason in connection with the plot. He confessed to the charge, saying "Legally speaking it is treason; actually it is not. For I no longer feel an obligation of loyalty. I see in Hitler the perpetrator of evil in history." He was sentenced to death and hanged the same day at Plötzensee Prison in Berlin.

== Aftermath ==
In August 1998, the German Bundestag cancelled the judgements of the Volksgerichtshofs and special courts with a law, zur Aufhebung nationalsozialistischer Unrechtsurteile in der Strafrechtspflege (overturning unjust National Socialist judgments in criminal cases).

== See also ==
- German Resistance
- List of members of the 20 July plot
