= Christina Stresemann =

German judge (born 1957)

Christina Stresemann (born 1957) is a German retired judge at the Federal Court of Justice. She retired on 31 May 2022.

Until 2003, Stresemann worked at the District Court in Berlin, in the Berlin State Ministry of Justice and at the Chamber's Court in Cologne.

Stresemann was the personal secretary of Jutta Limbach, then-Berlin Senator of Justice, from 1989 to 1992. From 1995 to 1998, she was a scientific assistant to Jutta Limbach, then-President of the Federal Constitutional Court of Germany.

Stresemann is the daughter of Wolfgang Stresemann and granddaughter of liberal statesman Gustav Stresemann, the Nobel Peace Prize-winning German Chancellor and Foreign Minister during the Weimar Republic. Her grandmother, Gustav Stresemann's wife Käte, was Jewish.

Stresemann is married to Ingo Müller, Professor of Administration in Hamburg.
