= Ulrich Wilhelm Graf Schwerin von Schwanenfeld =

German landowner, officer and member of the resistance (1902–1944)

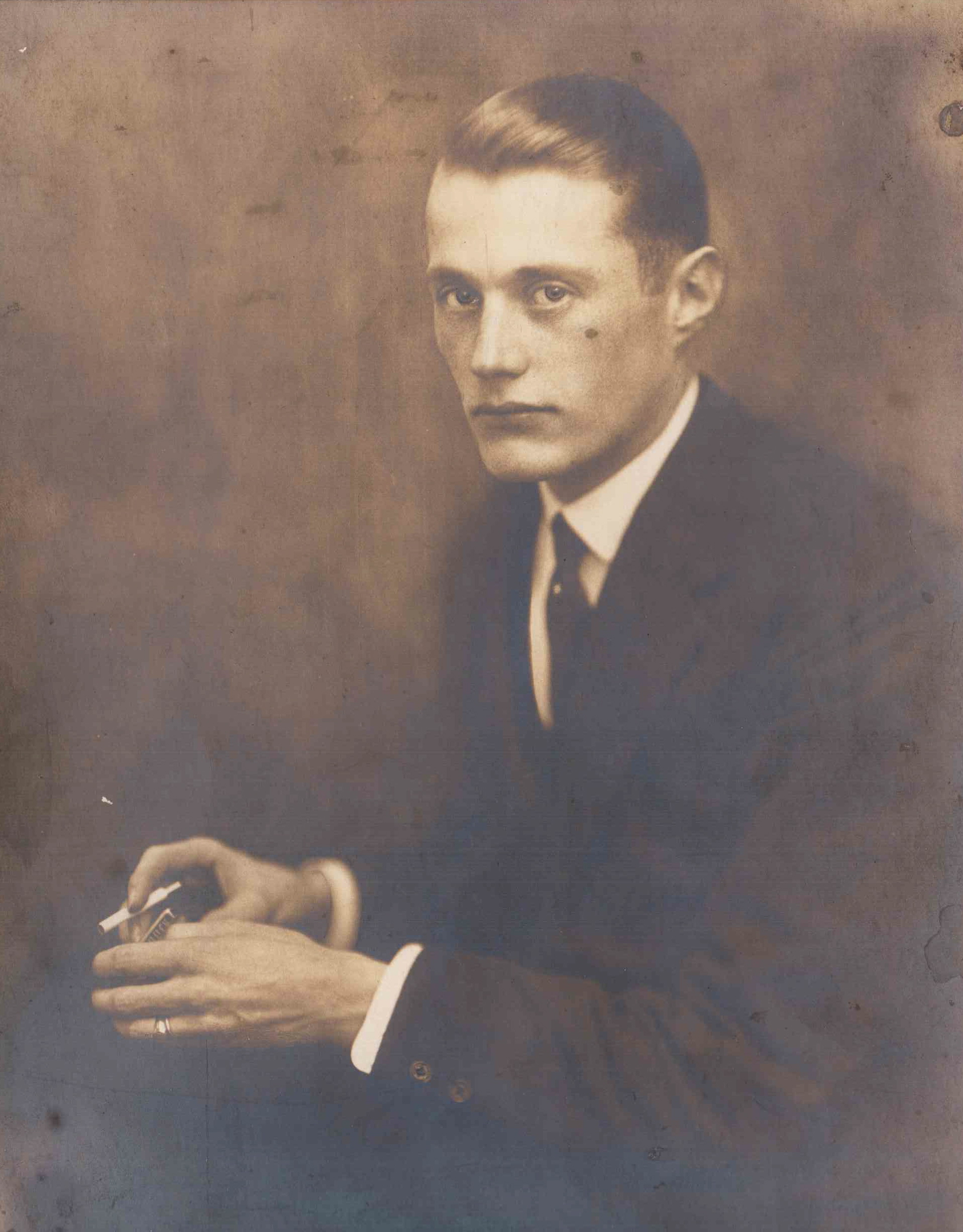
Schwerin in 1927

Ulrich-Wilhelm Graf Schwerin von Schwanenfeld (21 December 1902 – 8 September 1944) was a German landowner, officer, and resistance fighter against the Nazi régime. His name is commonly shortened to Schwerin.

== Biography ==
Count Schwerin von Schwanenfeld was born in the Danish capital, Copenhagen, the son of the German diplomat Ulrich Graf von Schwerin (1864–1930) and his wife Freda von Bethmann-Hollweg, a cousin of Chancellor Theobald von Bethmann Hollweg. The Uradel House of Schwerin, named after the Mecklenburg capital, was first documented in the 12th century; the family held large estates in the Brandenburgian Uckermark region and the adjacent lands of Mecklenburg-Strelitz.

Schwerin's family moved to Dresden when he was twelve years old. He finished school at the convent of Roßleben, Thuringia in 1921 and went to study agronomy at the Technische Hochschule of Munich. As a witness of the 1923 Beer Hall Putsch, he found Nazism loathsome to his Christian and social convictions (he was a Knight of Justice in the Protestant Order of Saint John, to which he had been admitted in 1933). Schwerin was graduated at Breslau in 1926 and administered his family's manors in Göhren (today part of Woldegk, Mecklenburg) and Sartowice near Świecie, Pomerelia in Poland. In 1928, he married Marianne Sahm, a daughter of Heinrich Sahm, then president of the Free City of Danzig senate.

By 1935, Schwerin had come to believe that the only way Adolf Hitler could be stopped was by assassinating him. Beginning in 1938 ahead of the German occupation of Czechoslovakia, Schwerin belonged to the tightest circle of the resistance along with his personal friends Peter Graf Yorck von Wartenburg and Fritz-Dietlof Graf von der Schulenburg, and later also to the Kreisau Circle. With the beginning of World War II, he was called up to the Wehrmacht as an officer in the staff of Generaloberst Erwin von Witzleben. After Witzleben's dismissal in 1942, Schwerin was transferred to Utrecht until in March 1943, Major General Hans Oster appointed him to the Abwehr office at the Oberkommando der Wehrmacht in Berlin.

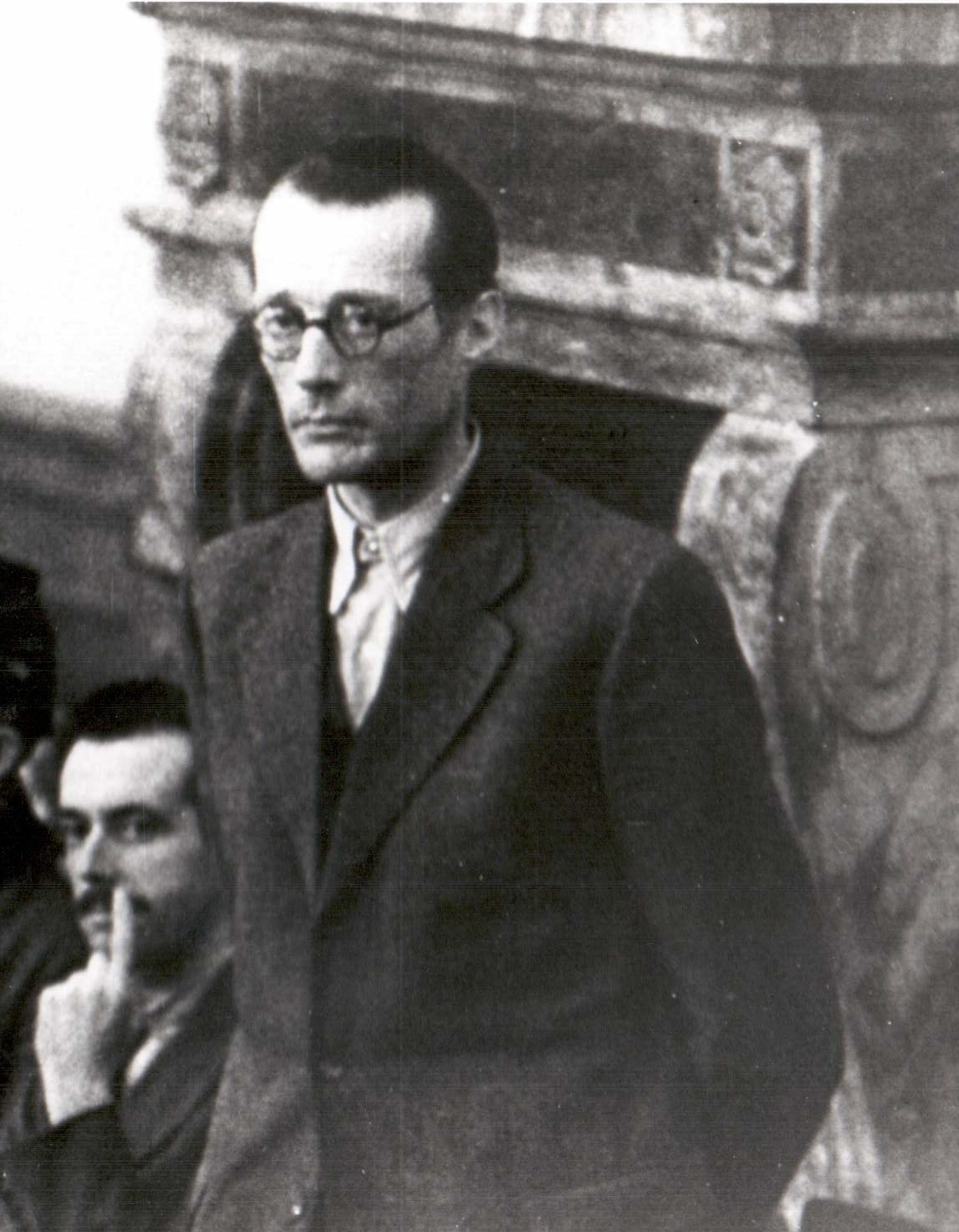
Defendant before the Volksgerichtshof, 1944

Schwerin participated in the failed attempt on Hitler's life and coup d'état on 20 July 1944 from his position at the Bendlerblock, where the plotters' headquarters were, although he had been saying for weeks that the chances for a successful coup were very slight. There, on the night of 21 July 1944, he was arrested, and on 21 August was sentenced to death by the Volksgerichtshof, with Roland Freisler presiding. The recordings of the show trial attest how a doomed Schwerin, ravaged by the conditions of his detention and brought to court without a belt and tie, tried to preserve his dignity. He stated that his opposition to Hitler was due to "the many murders (...) in Germany and abroad". He was constantly interrupted by a furious Freisler, who finally shouted him down in rage.

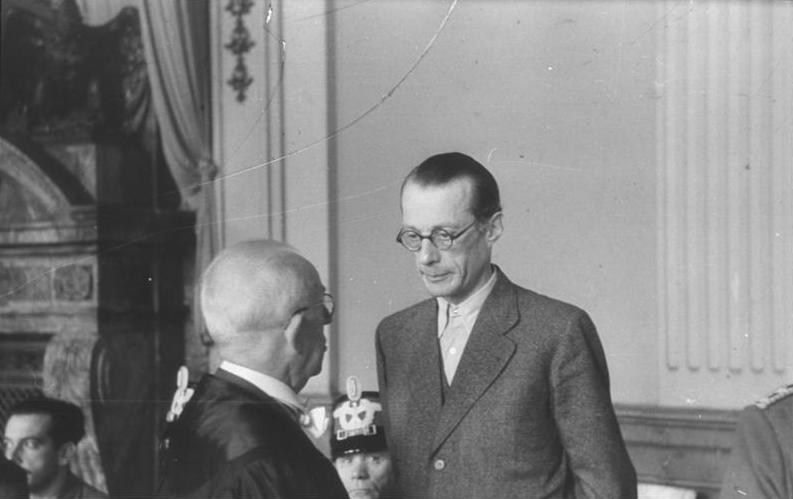
Ulrich Wilhelm Schwanenfeld during his trial in 1944.

On 8 September, Schwerin was hanged at Plötzensee Prison in Berlin. He is buried at the Waldfriedhof Dahlem.

== See also ==
- List of members of the 20 July plot
- German Resistance (Widerstand)
- German resistance to Nazism
- Roland Freisler

== Literature ==
- Detlef Graf von Schwerin, Die Jungen des 20. Juli 1944. Brücklmeier, Kessel, Schulenburg, Schwerin, Wussow, Yorck; Berlin 1991
- Hans-Joachim Ramm: ... stets einem Höheren verantwortlich. Christliche Grundüberzeugungen im innermilitärischen Widerstand gegen Hitler; Neuhausen u, Stuttgart (Hänssler) 1996 (ISBN 3-7751-2635-X)
- Friedrich Ebert Foundation 2007, Widerstand gegen das NS-Regime in den Regionen Mecklenburg und Vorpommern
  - Ulrich-Wilhelm Graf v. Schwerin v. Schwanenfeld 1902-1944. »Für ein Deutschland des Rechts und der Gerechtigkeit« (online)
