= Hans Würtz =

Hans Würtz, born Johannes Würtz (18 May 1875, in Heide, Holstein – 13 July 1958, in Berlin) was one of the most influential and controversial figures in German "Krüppelpädagogik" (special education) during the Weimar Republic. He wrote over 50 books. He is buried at the Waldfriedhof Dahlem in Berlin.
