= Gustav Stresemann Business School =

High school in Mainz, Germany

Coordinates: 49°58′52.1″N 8°16′39.5″E

The GSW (Gustav-Stresemann-Wirtschaftsschule) is a German high school in Mainz. Mainz is the capital of Rhineland-Palatinate. The school is situated between the station Mainz Römisches Theater and the industrial area of the city. It is named after Gustav Stresemann, the liberal politician and statesman.

== Campus ==
The buildings of GSW are divided into two buildings connected with a passageway. The two buildings are subdivided into 4 levels. In the building B are the staffrooms, secretary and headmasters. The building A is only used for students.

The buildings have 7 PC-rooms, special chemistry and physics room and a training room for students were they can work and train at the PC. Beyond the school there is an underground car-park.

== History ==
On April 15, 1907, the Gustav-Stresemann commercial school was found as a high school. In 1909, the school was extended into a one-year commercial elementary school for boys. In 1922, the school was established at the “Domus University” as a two-year school.

Between 1944 and 47, caused by the war and the destruction of a schoolbuilding after a bombing raid, the school closed for 3 years. On April 15, 1947, the school reopened in a different location with the principal Dr. Dörr.

In 1952-55 the school was headed by Dr. J.Kloster, followed in 1955 by Mr. Steglich.

In 1958 the school moved to the Zitadelle Mainz. At the citadel the school occupied two small buildings. The citadel had direct access to the train station. During that time some later successful pupils attended classes, like Karl-Heinz Kipp, the “Massa” founder of the “Bakery Ditsch”, Peter Ditsch.

In 1964 a name change to “Gustav-Stresemann school” took place. Gustav Stresemann was a Nobel Prize laureate, also famous as head of the foreign office. He supported the reconciliation between Germany and France after the First World War and workers' rights.

In 1968 Gustav-Stresemann school changed to a commercial school.

1973-89 Theo Hipleh headed Gustav-Stresemann commercial school, followed by Mrs. Nortrud Hummel from 1990 to 1993. Her successor was Günter Mattis.

2004-2013 Ibolya Havel-Scheuermann.

In 1979/80 the Gustav-Stresemann commercial school reorganised to also provide language skills. 1999 Gustav-Stresemann school moved out of the citadel compound into a former IBM building.

In 2002/03 a basic business training school was added, providing classes to apprentices. Finally in 2007, a total of 855 pupils and 80 teachers constitute “GSW”

== Business oriented grammar school ==
The objective of the business oriented grammar school is to get the university entrance and learning about business subjects. The attendance of the course takes usually 3 years.

== Requirements ==
To enter the business oriented grammar school one must have the secondary school qualification or an equivalent qualification with a grade average of 3.0. The main subjects German, English, and Mathematics have to be “sufficient” means grade 4 or better. A pupil who has acquired the qualification of the business oriented secondary school specified in foreign languages and has finished this course with a “sufficient” grade or better, can be taken up without attendance of the introductory year 11, immediately to the 12th class (12/1) of the business oriented grammar school.

== Characteristics of the course ==
The course covers the introductory year 11/1 and 11/2 and two year qualification phase (half-years 12/1;12/2;13/1 and 13/2). The general qualification for university entrance examination is accomplished in the second half year of the 13th class. The only transfer is from 11th to 12th class.

== Qualification phase ==
The pupils start the Qualification Phase 12/1 with their selected subject combinations and have to take it till the last school year 13/2. At the end of 13/2 they will have a demanded exam and to get finally their general qualification for university entrance.
