= Kurt von Kleefeld =

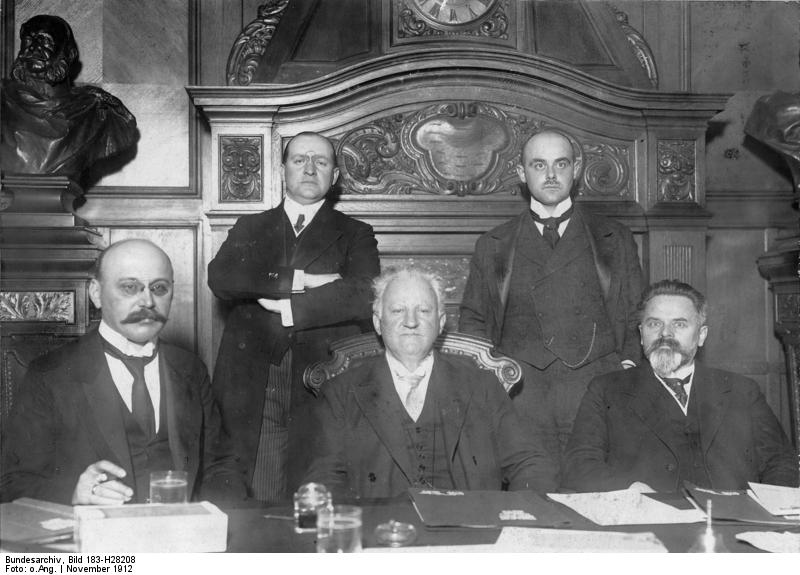
Kurt von Kleefeld (no. 2 from right), 1912

Kurt von Kleefeld (born 16 October 1881 in Kassel as Kurt Kleefeld, died 1934 in Berlin) was a German lawyer, executive director of the House, President of the Chamber and executive director of the princely mines and industrial activities of the princely Hohenlohe family.

== Biography ==
He was the last person in Germany to be ennobled. On the request of his employer, Prince Christian Kraft zu Hohenlohe-Öhringen, he was raised to the hereditary nobility of the Principality of Lippe by Leopold IV, Prince of Lippe, "in recognition of his loyal service" on 12 November 1918, the same day as the Sovereign Prince's abdication and the abolition of monarchy.

== Personal life ==
He belonged to a family of industrialists. Both his parents had a Jewish family background but were Protestant by religion. His sister, Käte Stresemann, was married to the German Chancellor and Nobel Peace Prize laureate Gustav Stresemann. In 1919 he married Countess Gudrun von Schwerin (1901–1988); they didn't have issue.

== Literature ==
- Adelslexikon Vol. VI, Limburg an der Lahn 1987
- Gothaisches Genealogisches Taschenbuch der Adligen Häuser - Alter Adel und Briefadel, Gotha 1927
