= Black lounge suit =

Men's semi-formal daytime attire

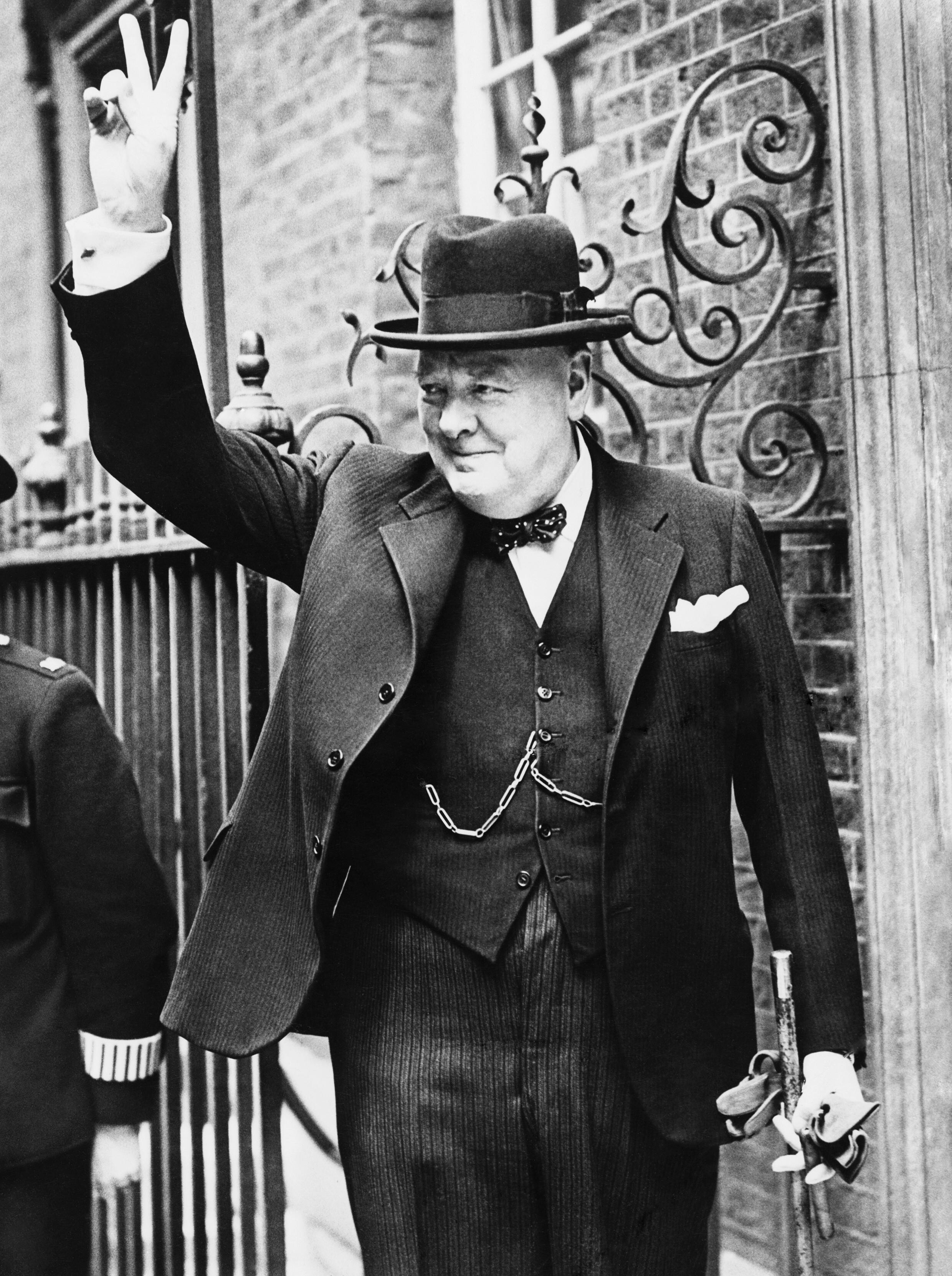
U.K. Prime Minister Winston Churchill in 1943, giving his V sign wearing a black lounge suit with formal trousers, dotted bowtie, dark waistcoat, homburg hat, and a walking stick

The black lounge suit (UK), stroller (US), or Stresemann (Continental Europe), is a men's day attire intermediate between formal morning dress and a conventional lounge suit; comprising grey striped or check morning trousers, but distinguished by a conventional-length lounge jacket, single- or double-breasted in black, midnight blue or grey.

== Name ==
In British English, it is called a black lounge suit. Since black was reserved for morning coats and evening attire, it was unknown as a colour for lounge suits, so the term was unambiguous. It has also been referred to as a Marlborough suit in the UK.

In American English. the style is referred to as a stroller suit, club coat or sack coat.

Around continental Europe, the style is often called a Stresemann after the German chancellor Gustav Stresemann (1878–1929) of the Weimar Republic, who wore the style as an alternative to the morning coat. In German, it is also known as Bonner Anzug (English: "Bonn suit") after the capital of post-war West Germany.

It is also known as a director's suit from the term inside director (especially in Japan), or citydress.

== History ==
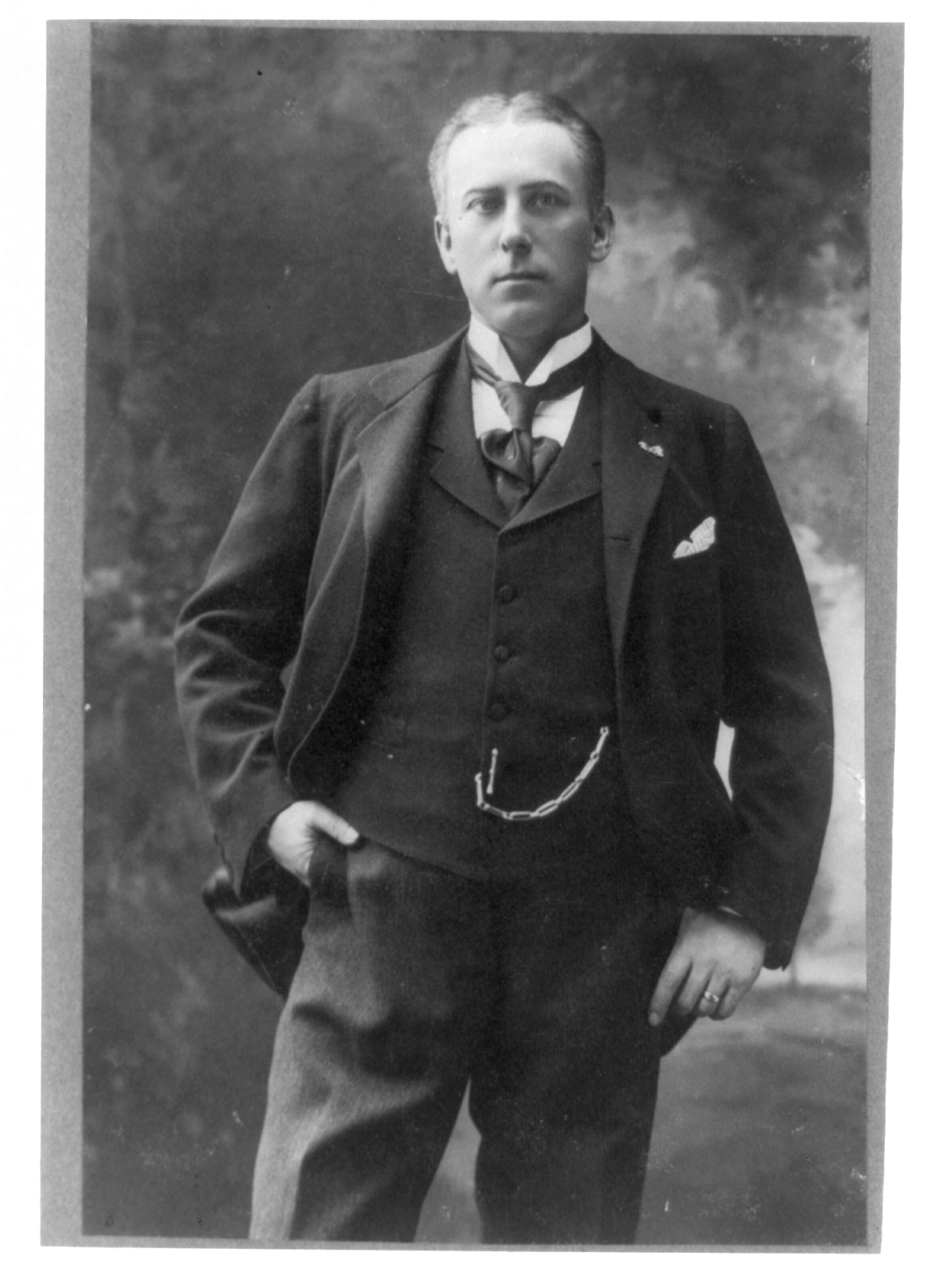
Max Alvary in a black lounge suit before the conventional name of it in 1896

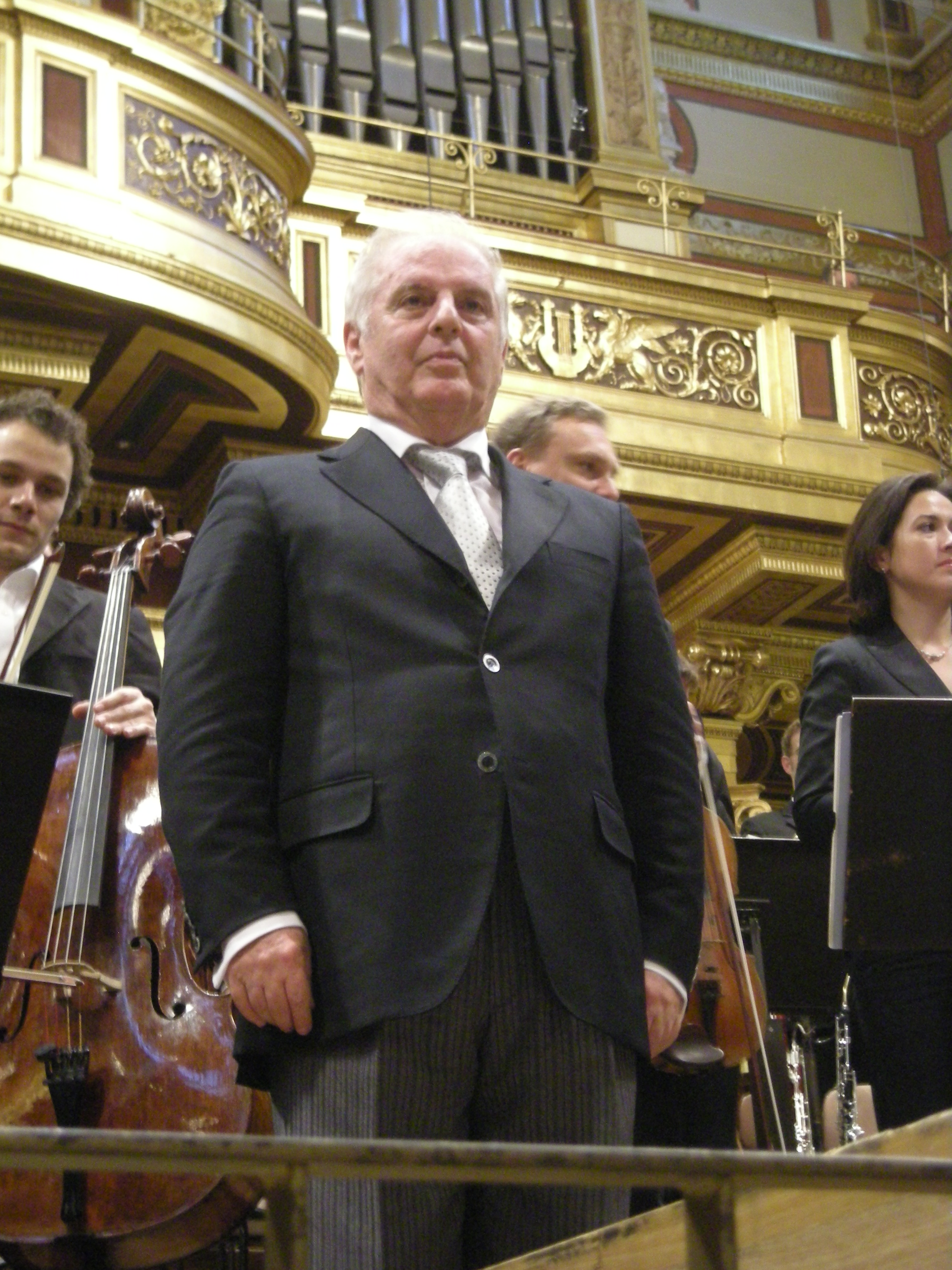
Argentine pianist and conductor Daniel Barenboim at the Musikverein in Vienna, Austria (2008)

While early prototypes of black lounge suits did occur in the late 19th century, the current form was settled around 1900.

Stresemann famously wore the suit during the negotiations of the Locarno Treaties in 1925, and in Germany it became synonymous with him.

Winston Churchill is depicted in many photographs and paintings wearing a black lounge suit and striped formal trousers while serving as Prime Minister of the United Kingdom.

In the United Kingdom, this mode of dress is now unusual, though this dress code sometimes does occur in fraternal orders such as Freemasonry for daytime meetings. It is also still worn within the legal profession, especially by barristers. Indeed, the striped formal trousers are in some circles referred to as "barrister trousers".

The black lounge suit with striped trousers apparent decline in use, as opposed to the staying power of its evening counterpart, the dinner jacket, could be attributed to several factors: daytime formality in general, and specifically the standard of changing clothes for various occasions, fell out of general use in post–Second World War Western culture; and black lounge suits were sometimes associated with uniformed servants, a concept which had also fallen out of favour. By the late 20th century, fictional characters in media depicted wearing black lounge suits were often portrayed as self-important or inflexible snobs, often in opposition to more sympathetic characters dressed casually.

Traditionally, in Continental Europe and the Commonwealth of Nations, morning dress is worn to certain formal day events, and white tie for the most formal of evening events. However, when both dress codes declined in use in the United States, this also affected the use of the stroller.

Yet, notably, at his first inauguration in 1981, former US President Ronald Reagan wore a black lounge suit. When his planned attire was announced it generated some controversy among Washington DC politicians who thought they were being told to acquire such suits as well.

== In media ==
Gentlemen's valets of the early 20th century are often depicted in television and film wearing black lounge suits as their standard apparel. In the 1964 Walt Disney film Mary Poppins (set in the 1910s), the character of Mr. Banks wears a black lounge suit to work every day at the bank. On Her Majesty's Secret Service (1969) of the James Bond films features a black lounge suit wedding. The Pan Tau children's television series (1969–1978) features a black lounge suit-wearing protagonist with the same name. In the long-running BBC sitcom Are You Being Served? (1972–1985), the character Captain Peacock always wore a black lounge suit as the store's floorwalker. Jeeves, played by Stephen Fry in Jeeves and Wooster (1990–1993), dressed impeccably. The character of John Bates of Downton Abbey (2010–2015) typically appears in a black lounge suit while serving as the Earl's valet. In the German neo-noir crime drama Babylon Berlin (2017–), set during the Weimar Republic, German Foreign Minister Gustav Stresemann wears a Stresemann suit accordingly.

== Gallery ==
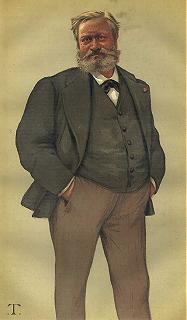
Caricature of Edmond François Valentin About in Vanity Fair (20 November 1880)

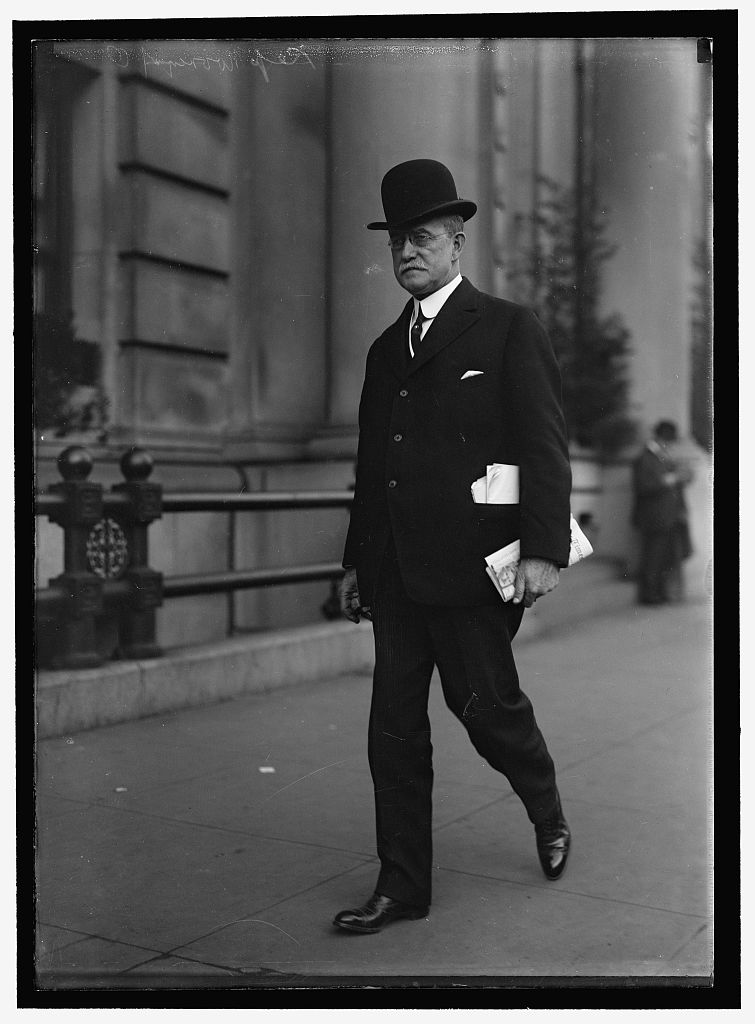
William C. Mooney, congressman from Woodsfield, Ohio, United States, in stroller and bowler hat (1915)

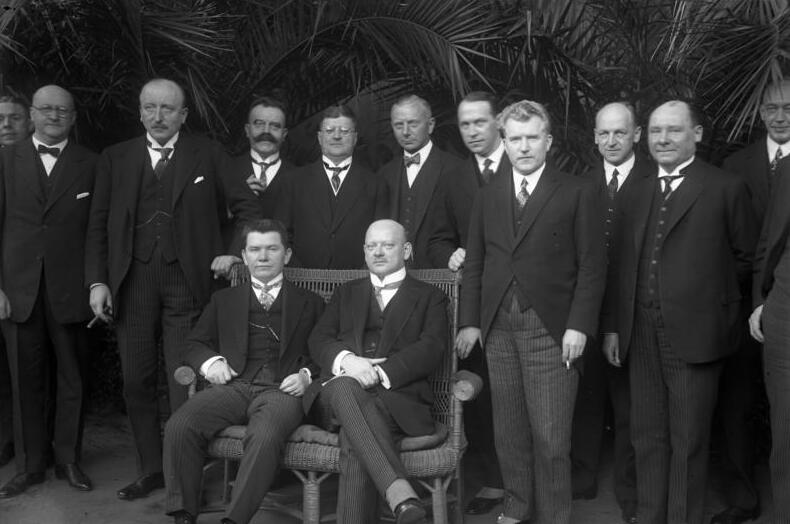
Gustav Stresemann (sitting on the right, with Augustinas Voldemaras), Berlin (1928)

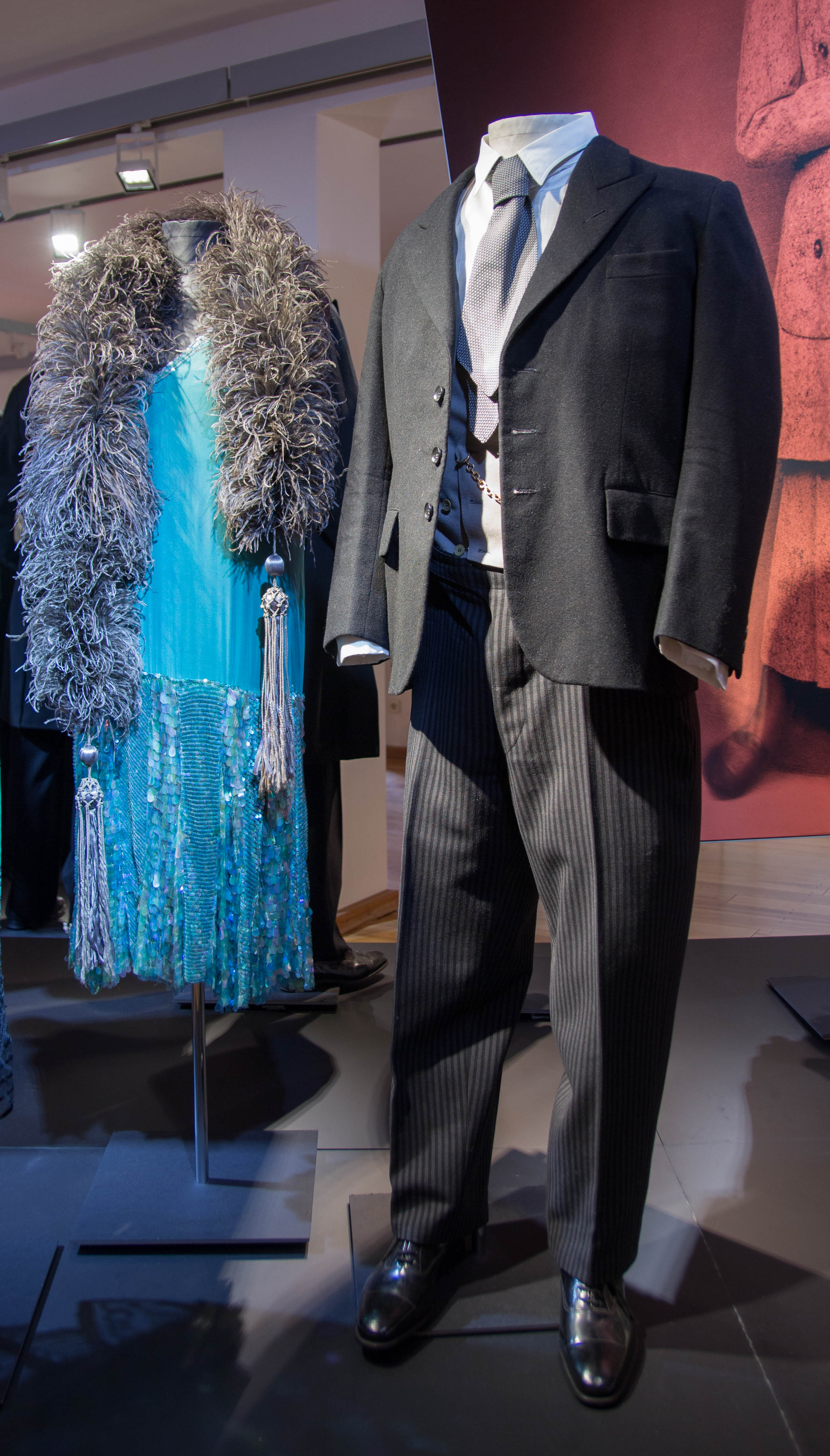
A Stresemann in an exhibition of the Textilfabrik Cromford, Ratingen, Germany

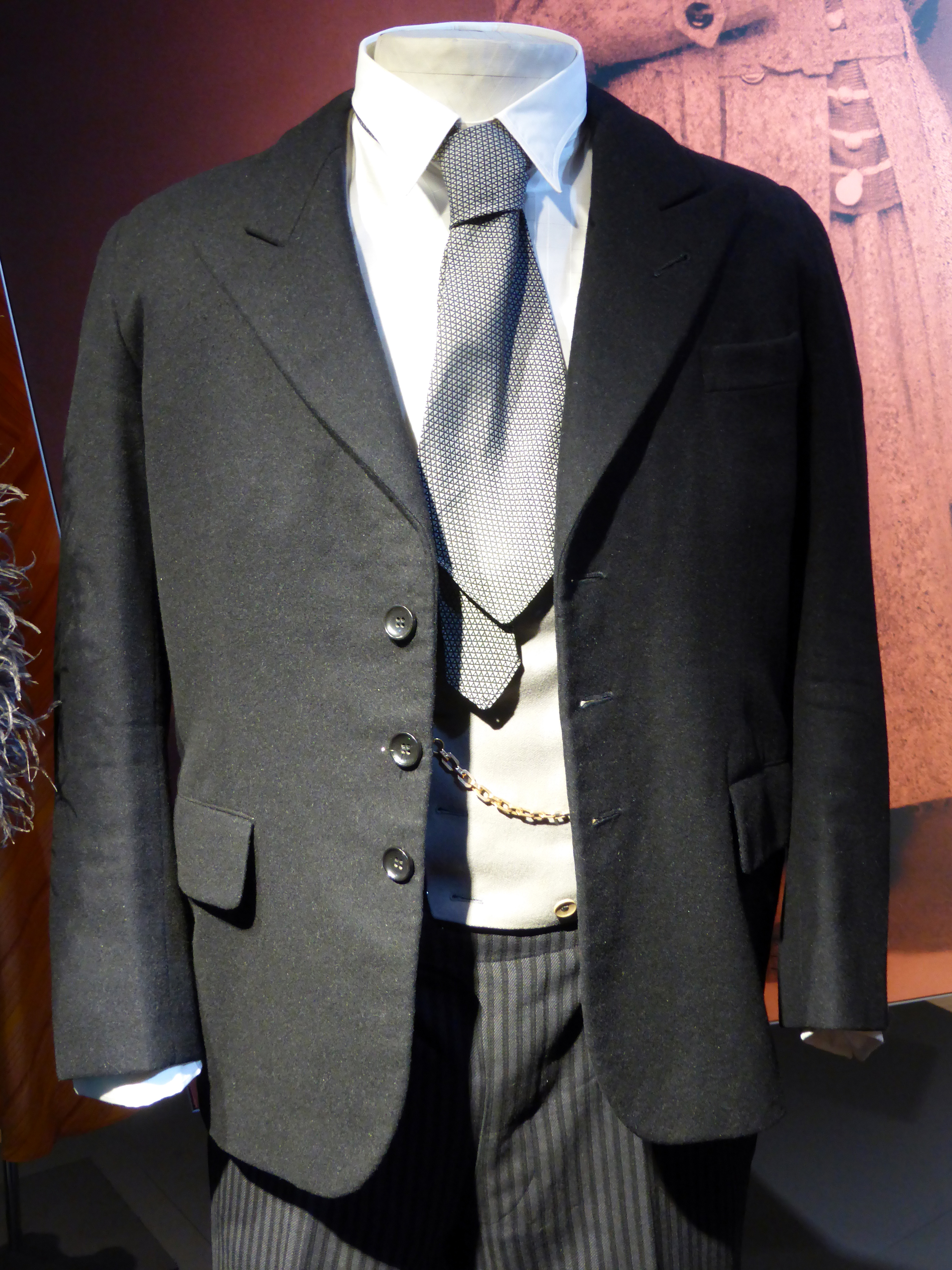
Further detail

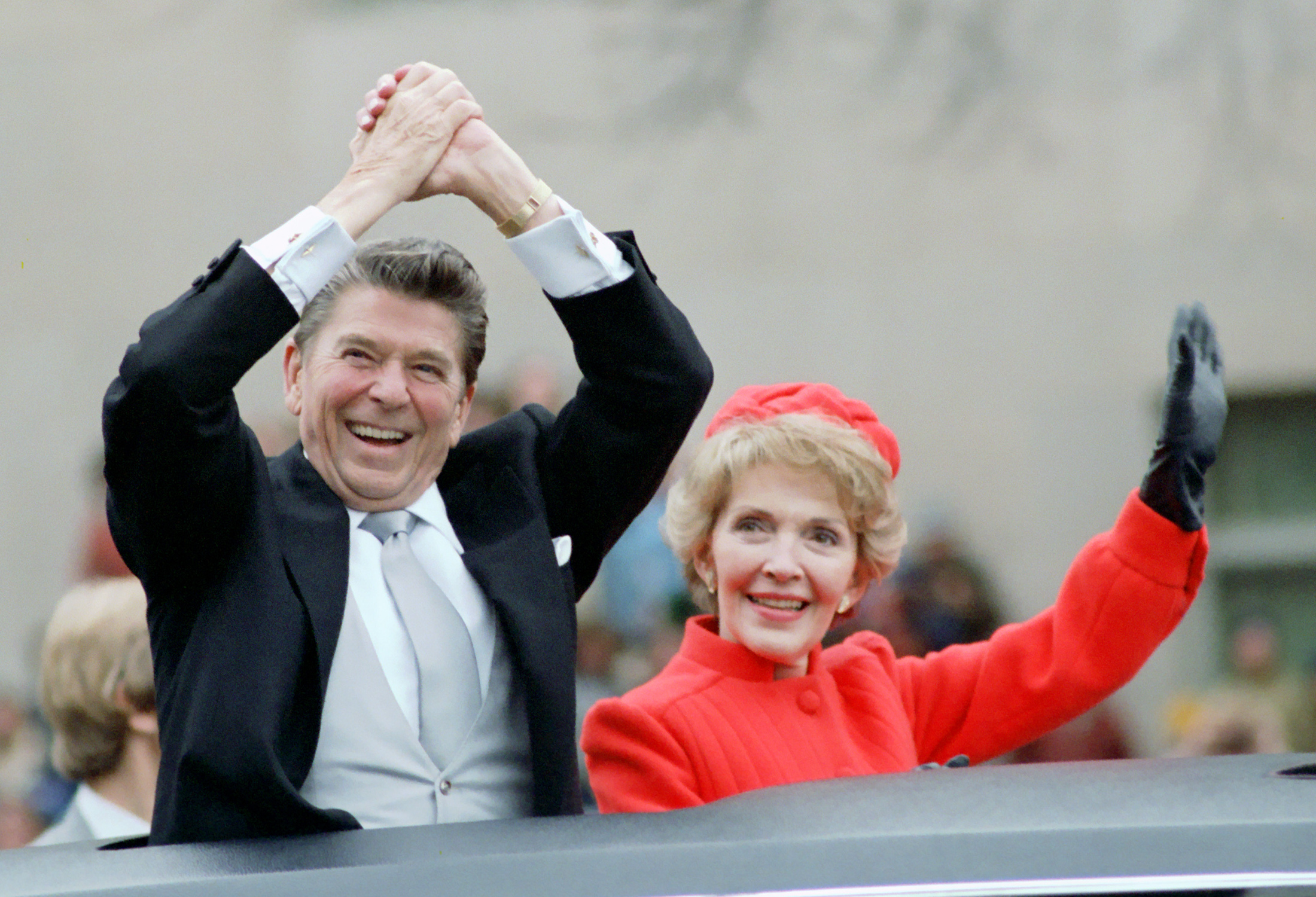
U.S. President Ronald Reagan and wife Nancy Reagan waving from the limousine during the inaugural parade in Washington, D.C. (1981)

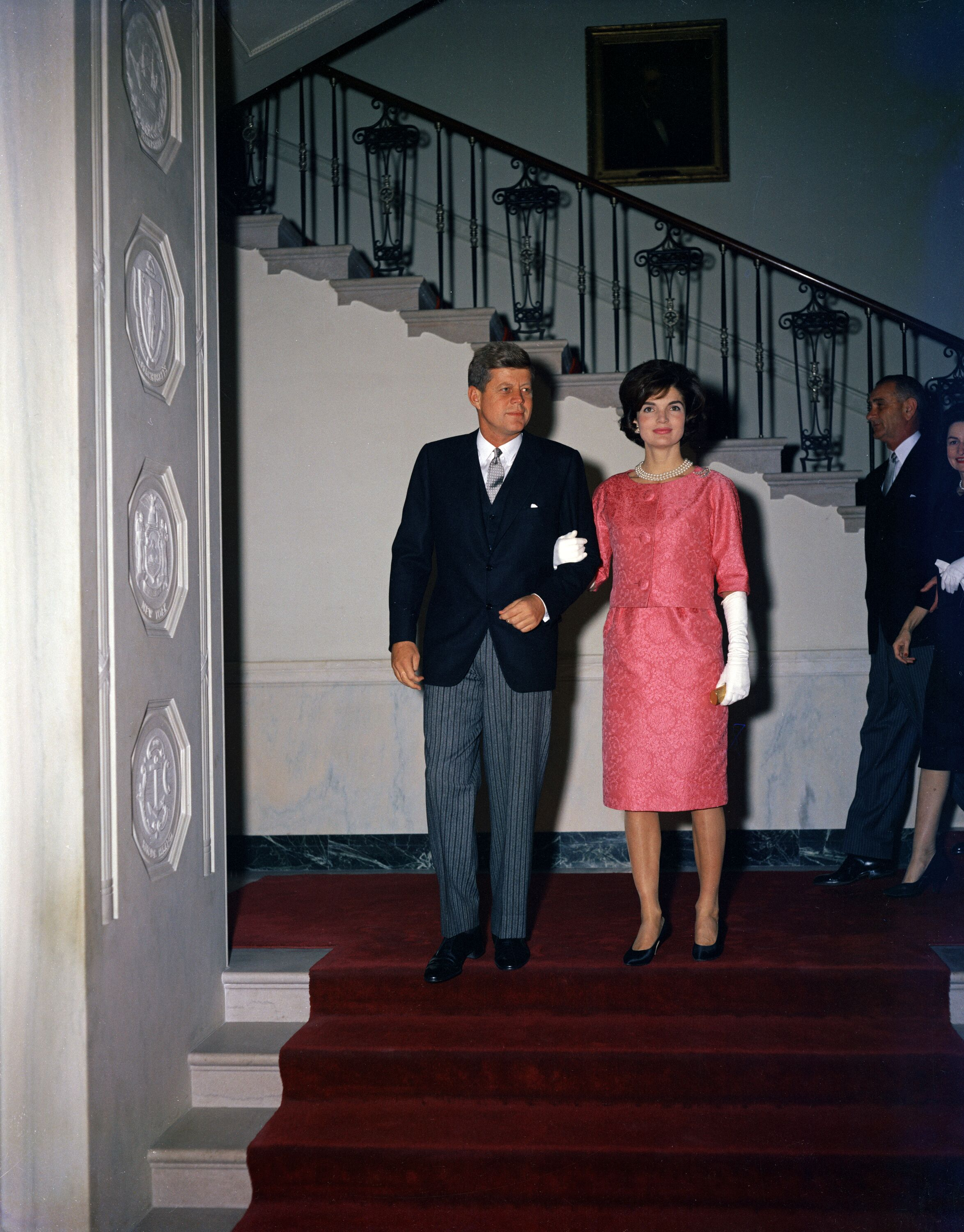
President Kennedy wears a black lounge to a diplomatic reception at the White House in 1961.

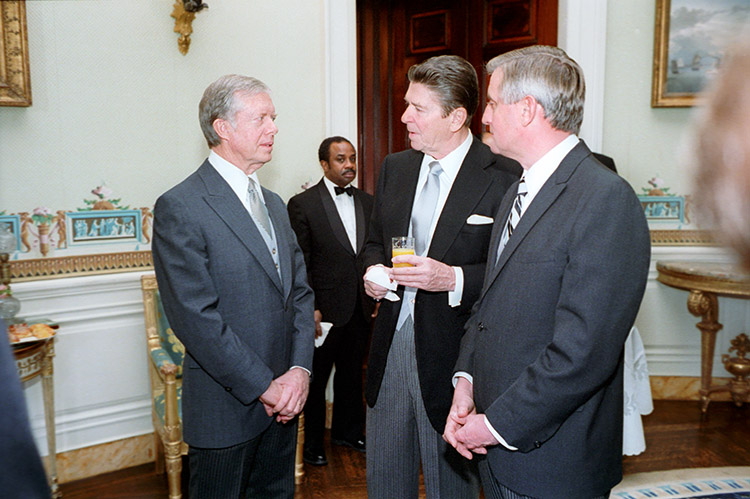
President Carter, Vice President Mondale and President elect Reagan in grey stroller suits before Reagan's Inauguration in January 1981

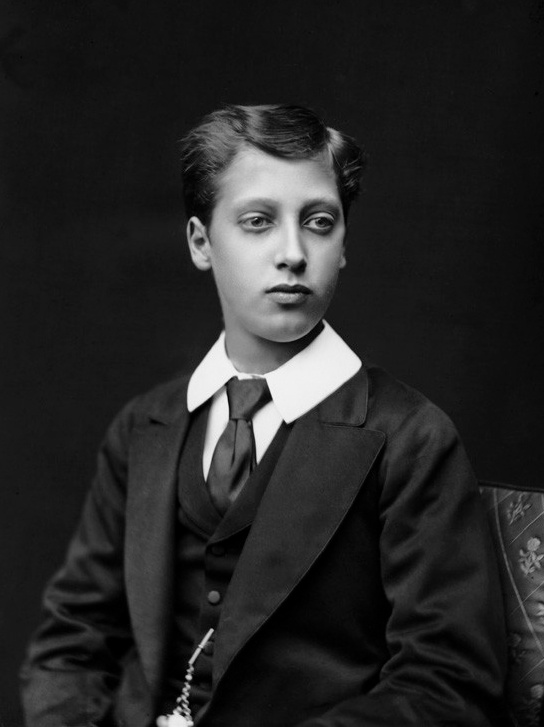
Eleven-year-old Prince Albert Victor in black lounge suit

== See also ==
- Suit
- Western dress codes
