= Wolfgang Stresemann =

German jurist, orchestra leader, conductor and composer

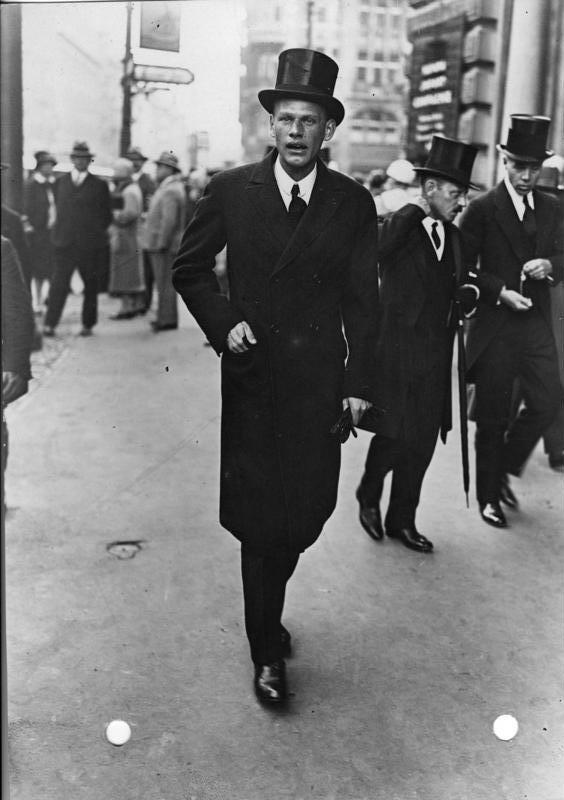
Wolfgang Stresemann in 1928.

Wolfgang Gert Stresemann (20 July 1904 – 6 November 1998) was a German jurist, orchestra leader, conductor and composer. He was the intendant of the Berliner Philharmoniker from 1959 to 1978 and again from mid 1984 to early 1985, a time when Herbert von Karajan served as music director.

Stresemann was the son of the German statesman and Nobel Peace Prize laureate Gustav Stresemann and his wife Käte, born Kleefeld.

From 1939 to 1956, Stresemann lived in the United States with his mother.

Stresemann's daughter Christina (born 1957) was a judge at the Federal Court of Justice of Germany.

== Publications ==
- Mein Vater, Gustav Stresemann (1979)
- Ein seltsamer Mann; Erinnerungen an Herbert von Karajan
- Wie konnte es geschehen? Hitlers Aufstieg in der Erinnerung eines Zeitzeugen
- Philharmonie und Philharmoniker
- ... und abends in die Philharmonie. Erinnerungen an große Dirigenten
- Zeiten und Klaenge: Ein Leben zwischen Musik und Politik
- Eine Lanze für Felix Mendelssohn
