= Käte Stresemann =

German socialite (1883–1970)

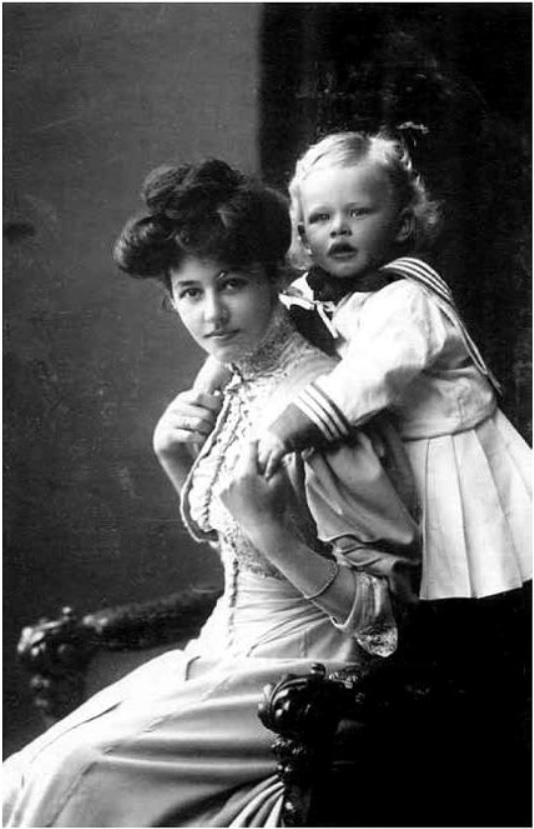
- Käte Stresemann c. 1906, with her older son, Wolfgang
- Born: Käte Kleefeld; 15 July 1883; Lankwitz, Landkreis Teltow, German Empire
- Died: 23 July 1970 (aged 87); West Berlin
- Spouse: Gustav Stresemann (m. 1903; died 1929)

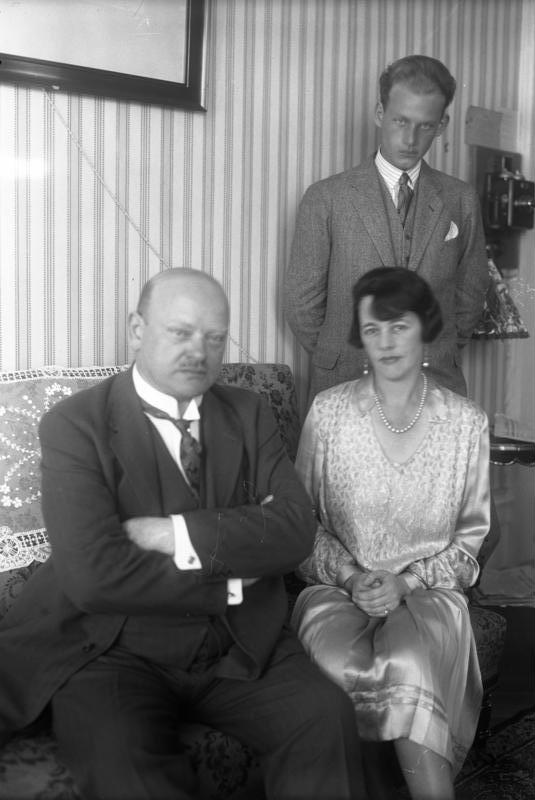
Gustav Stresemann with his wife Käte and their son Wolfgang at the Hotel Metropol Geneva 1927

Käte Stresemann (née Kleefeld; 15 July 1883 – 23 July 1970) was the wife of the German Chancellor, Foreign Minister and Nobel Peace Prize laureate Gustav Stresemann. Widely admired for her elegance and intelligence, she was a prominent figure of society in the 1920s. As the wife of the foreign minister she made her salon at Tauentzienstraße 12a a meeting place of diplomats.

She was the daughter of a prominent Berlin industrialist, Adolf (also known as Arthur, born Aaron) Kleefeld. Both of her parents were born Jewish, but they raised their children as Lutherans. In 1903 she married Gustav Stresemann (1878–1929), who later became Chancellor and Foreign Minister of the Weimar Republic, and bore him two sons, Wolfgang (1904–1998) and Hans-Joachim (1908–1999).

Her brother, Kurt von Kleefeld, was the last person in Germany to be ennobled, when he was raised to the hereditary nobility of the Principality of Lippe by Leopold IV, Prince of Lippe "in recognition of his loyal service" to his noble lord, Christian Kraft of Hohenlohe-Ohringen, Duke of Ujest, on request by the latter, on 12 November 1918, the same day as the Prince's abdication.

Kleefeld is mentioned in one of the fictitious quotes the 8 November 1926 issue of Time satirically attributed to quite a number of prominent people under the headline: Had they been interviewed, some people who figured in last week's news might have related certain of their doings as follows: Gustav Stresemann, Foreign Minister of Germany: "A story went the rounds of Berlin last week that my ability to entertain lavishly on a salary of $6,400 a year is due to the kindly furtherance of my affairs by the multimillionaire Dr. von Kleefeld, my bachelor brother-in-law."

In August 1929, when Käte Stresemann hosted the program for spouses at the 25th World Advertising Congress in Berlin, Time described her as "no hausfrau, but a young, elegant, cosmopolite, English speaking Jewess, a woman equipped with the conversation of the polite world, equal to parlor or nightclub."

In the autumn of 1939 she fled Nazi Germany with her son Wolfgang and his family and settled in the United States, where her son Hans-Joachim had already found refuge. She became a naturalized US citizen on April 13, 1953. She lived in New York City until her death on a visit to Germany.

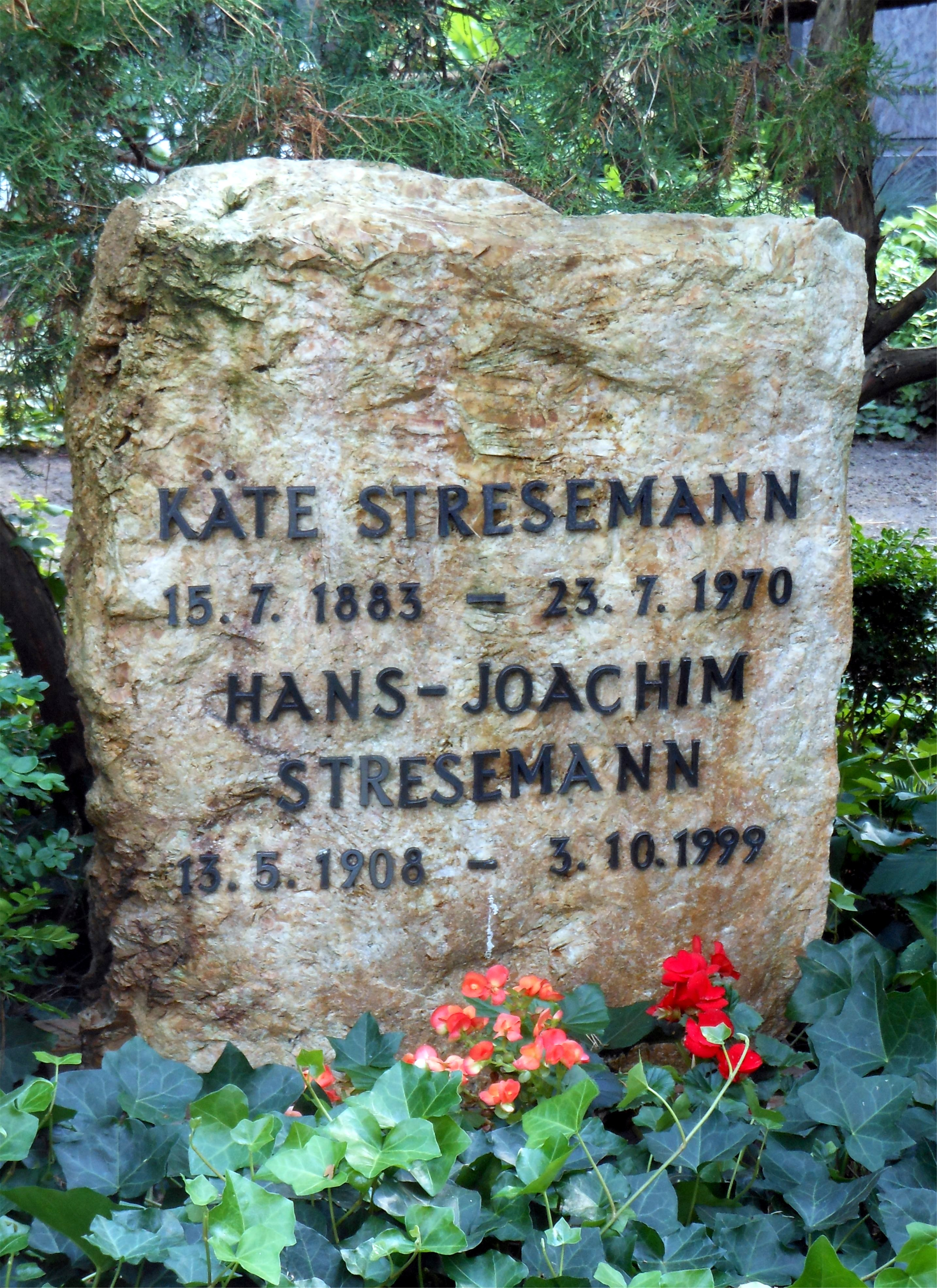
Gravestone Käte Stresemann, Waldfriedhof Dahlem
