= Gustav Stresemann =

Chancellor of Germany in 1923

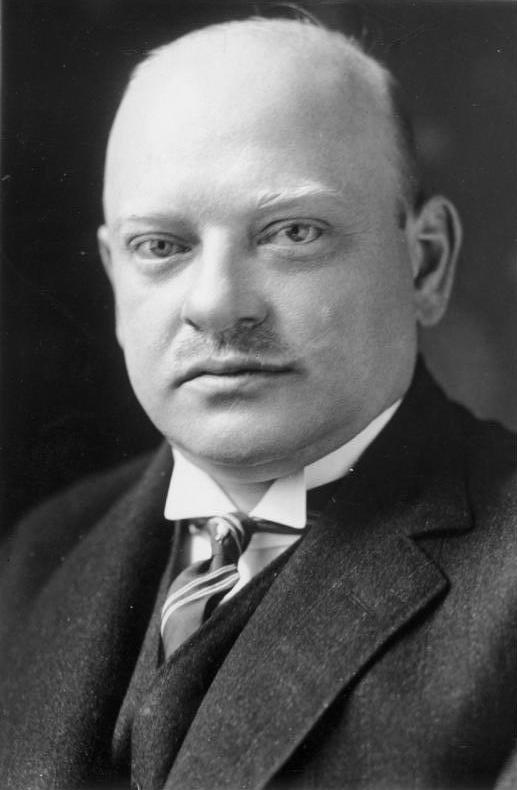
- Stresemann c. 1928–1929

Chancellor of Germany
- In office 13 August 1923 – 30 November 1923
- President: Friedrich Ebert
- Deputy: Robert Schmidt
- Preceded by: Wilhelm Cuno
- Succeeded by: Wilhelm Marx

Minister of Foreign Affairs
- In office 13 August 1923 – 3 October 1929
- Chancellor: Himself; Wilhelm Marx; Hans Luther; Hermann Müller
- Preceded by: Hans von Rosenberg
- Succeeded by: Julius Curtius

Leader of the German People's Party
- In office 15 December 1918 – 3 October 1929
- Preceded by: Position established
- Succeeded by: Ernst Scholz

Member of the Reichstag
- In office 24 June 1920 – 3 October 1929
- Constituency: National list (1924–1929); Potsdam II (1920–1924)

Member of the Reichstag
- In office 19 February 1907 – 9 November 1918
- Constituency: Hannover 2 (1912–1918); Saxony 21 (1907–1912)

Personal details
- Born: 10 May 1878 Berlin, Germany
- Died: 3 October 1929 (aged 51) Berlin, Germany
- Resting place: Alter Luisenstadt-Friedhof, Berlin
- Party: National Liberal (1907–1918); German Democratic (1918); German People's (1918–1929)
- Spouse: Käte Kleefeld (m. 1903)
- Children: Wolfgang; Hans-Joachim
- Awards: Nobel Peace Prize (1926)
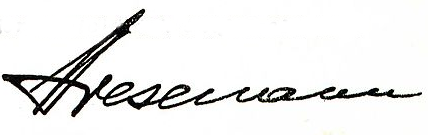
- Signature

Gustav Ernst Stresemann (German pronunciation: [ˈɡʊstaf ˈʃtʁeːzəˌman]; 10 May 1878 – 3 October 1929) was a German statesman during the Weimar Republic who served as chancellor of Germany from August to November 1923 and as foreign minister from 1923 to 1929. His most notable achievement was the reconciliation between Germany and France, for which he and French Prime Minister Aristide Briand received the Nobel Peace Prize in 1926. During a period of political instability and fragile, short-lived governments, Stresemann was seen at his death as "the person who maintained the precarious balance of the political system."

Stresemann attended the University of Berlin and Leipzig University, where he studied political economy, history and international law and developed his vision of liberalism and nationalism, a combination of views that would define his political career. After obtaining his doctorate, Stresemann worked in trade associations before entering politics. In 1907, he was elected to the Reichstag as a deputy for the National Liberal Party. He lost his seat in 1912 but was re-elected two years later. During World War I, he was a vocal advocate for German militarism and expansionism. Exempted from war service due to poor health, he gradually became the National Liberals' de facto leader before formally taking over the party in 1917. Germany's defeat and the fall of the Hohenzollern monarchy came as a significant shock to Stresemann, forcing him to gradually reassess his previous positions. He founded the German People's Party (DVP) and, despite his own monarchist beliefs, came to grudgingly accept Weimar democracy and became open to working with the centre and the left.

In August 1923, Stresemann was named chancellor and foreign minister of a grand coalition government. During his brief chancellorship, he abandoned the policy of passive resistance against the French-Belgian occupation of the Ruhr and introduced the Rentenmark in a (relatively successful) attempt to tame hyperinflation in the country. In November, Stresemann's reshuffled government collapsed after the Social Democrats withdrew from the coalition. He resigned as chancellor following a vote of no confidence but remained as foreign minister in the new government led by Wilhelm Marx. His first major diplomatic success was the 1924 Dawes Plan, which reduced Germany's overall reparations commitment. It was followed by the Locarno Treaties in 1925, which confirmed Germany's postwar western borders, guaranteed peace with France, and led to Germany's admission to the League of Nations a year later. Stresemann also moved to improve relations with the Soviet Union through the 1926 Treaty of Berlin. In 1928, he oversaw Germany's participation in the Kellogg–Briand Pact, in which the signatory states promised not to use war to resolve international conflicts.

Amid failing health, Stresemann successfully negotiated the Young Plan, which sought to further reduce German reparations payments. He died in October 1929 after a series of strokes at the age of 51.

== Early years ==
Stresemann was born on 10 May 1878 at 66 Köpenicker Straße in southeast Berlin, the youngest of seven children. His father worked as a beer bottler and distributor, and also ran a small bar out of the family home, as well as renting rooms for extra money. The family was lower middle class, but relatively well-off for the neighbourhood, and had sufficient funds to provide Gustav with a high-quality education. Stresemann was an excellent student, particularly excelling in German literature and poetry. At the age of 16, he joined the Andreas Gymnasium to study. His parents brought him up to have an interest in books – he was especially passionate about history, with his teacher, Mr Wolff, commenting that he had an "almost sickly taste in history". He took an interest in Napoleon and Johann Wolfgang von Goethe, whom he later wrote about in his work Goethe und Napoleon: ein Vortrag ("Goethe and Napoleon: a Discourse"). His mother, Mathilde, died in 1895. From December 1895, he wrote "Berlin letters" for the newspaper Dresdener Volks-Zeitung, often talking about politics and targeting Prussian conservatives. In an essay written when he left school, he noted that he would have enjoyed becoming a teacher, but he would only have been qualified to teach languages or the natural sciences, which were not his primary areas of interest. Due to this, he enrolled in university.

In April 1897, Stresemann enrolled at the University of Berlin, where he was convinced by a businessman to study political economy instead of literature. During his university years, Stresemann became active in the Burschenschaften movement of student fraternities and became editor, in April 1898, of the Allgemeine Deutsche Universitäts-Zeitung, a newspaper run by Konrad Kuster, a leader in the liberal portion of the Burschenschaften. His editorials for the paper were often political and dismissed most of the contemporary political parties as broken in one way or another. In his early writings, he set out views that combined liberalism with strident nationalism, a combination that would dominate his views for the rest of his life. In 1898, Stresemann left the University of Berlin, transferring to the University of Leipzig so that he could pursue a doctorate. He studied history and international law and took literature courses. Influenced by Martin Kriele, he also took courses in economics. In March 1899, he stopped being an editor for the Allgemeine Deutsche Universitäts-Zeitung. He completed his studies in January 1901, submitting a thesis on the bottled beer industry in Berlin, which received a relatively high grade but was a subject of mockery from colleagues. Stresemann's doctoral supervisor was the economist Karl Bücher.

In 1902, Stresemann founded the Saxon Manufacturers' Association. In 1903, he married Käte Kleefeld (1883–1970), daughter of a wealthy Jewish Berlin businessman, and the sister of Kurt von Kleefeld, the last person in Germany to be ennobled (in 1918). At that time, he was also a member of Friedrich Naumann's National-Social Association. In 1906, he was elected to the Dresden town council. Though he had initially worked in trade associations, Stresemann soon became a leader of the National Liberal Party in Saxony. In 1907, he was elected to the Reichstag, where he soon became a close associate of party chairman Ernst Bassermann. However, his support of expanded social welfare programs did not sit well with some of the party's more conservative members, and he lost his post in the party's executive committee in 1912. Later that year, he lost both his Reichstag and town council seats. He returned to business and founded the German-American Economic Association. In 1914, he returned to the Reichstag. He was exempted from war service due to poor health. With Bassermann kept away from the Reichstag by either illness or military service, Stresemann soon became the National Liberals' de facto leader. After Bassermann's death in 1917, Stresemann succeeded him as the party leader.

== First World War ==
Prior to the war, Stresemann was associated with the left wing of the National Liberals. He believed in the maintenance of a balance of power between the British Empire, the United States, and Germany, the countries which he believed would be the world's economic superpowers. Yet he also supported the Anglo-German naval arms race, believing that the expansion of the Imperial German Navy was necessary to protect German international trade.

During World War I, he gradually moved to the right, expressing his support of the Hohenzollern monarchy and Germany's expansionist goals. He believed that Germany would need to annex Belgium, parts of north-east France, "extensive" lands in Eastern Europe and the French protectorate in Morocco in order to economically compete with the United States in the future. He was a vocal proponent of unrestricted submarine warfare. However, he still favoured an expansion of the social welfare programme and also supported an end to the restrictive Prussian three-class franchise. In 1916, he visited Constantinople and learned about the extent of the Ottoman Empire's Armenian genocide. Stresemann nevertheless agreed to the Turks' demand to recall of the German ambassador, Paul Wolff Metternich, and accused him of being too sympathetic to Armenians.

The collapse of the German Empire after its defeat in World War I and the German revolution of 1918–1919 drove Stresemann into a mental and physical breakdown, which shocked him into totally abandoning his earlier militarism and annexationism. When the Allied powers' peace terms became known, which included a crushing burden of reparations for the war, Constantin Fehrenbach, president of the Weimar National Assembly, denounced them and claimed "the will to break the chains of slavery would be implanted" into a generation of Germans. Stresemann said of this speech: "He was inspired in that hour by God to say what was felt by the German people. His words, spoken under Fichte's portrait, the final words of which merged into Deutschland, Deutschland über alles, made it an unforgettably solemn hour. There was, in that sense, a kind of uplifting grandeur. The impression left on all was tremendous."

== Weimar Republic years ==
=== Founding the German People's Party ===
Logo of the German People's Party, which Stresemann founded in 1918

After the war, Stresemann was interested in joining the German Democratic Party, which was formed from a merger of the Progressive People's Party with the left wing of the National Liberals. He wanted to be a part of a united post-war liberal party, but the leaders of the merger talks made it clear that they did not want anyone who had been an aggressive annexationist during the war. He then brought together the right wing of the old National Liberal Party and some of the Progressives into the German People's Party (Deutsche Volkspartei, DVP), with himself as chairman. Most of its support came from the educated and property-owning classes, with considerable financial aid from heavy industry. Initially, Stresemann and the DVP opposed the Weimar Republic and supported a restoration of the monarchy. The DVP platform promoted Christian family values, secular education, lower tariffs, opposition to welfare spending and agrarian subsidies, and hostility to communism and the Social Democrats.

The DVP was initially seen, along with the German National People's Party, as part of the "national opposition" to the Weimar Republic, particularly for its hesitant acceptance of democracy and sympathetic attitude towards the Freikorps and the Kapp Putsch in 1920. Beginning in 1919, Stresemann emphasized that Germany should try to regain its great-power status by leveraging the continued global economic influence and creditworthiness of its industry, pursuing peaceful economic expansion, and establishing friendly relations with the United States. By late 1920, Stresemann gradually moved to cooperation with the parties of the left and centre — possibly in reaction to political murders like that of Walther Rathenau. However, he remained a monarchist at heart.

=== Chancellor 1923 ===
On 13 August 1923, Stresemann was appointed chancellor and foreign minister of a grand coalition government in the so-called year of crises (1923). In social policy, a new system of binding arbitration was introduced in October 1923, in which an outside arbitrator had the final say in industrial disputes.

On 26 September 1923, Stresemann announced the end to the passive resistance against the occupation of the Ruhr by the French and Belgians, in tandem with an Article 48 (of the Weimar Constitution) state of emergency proclamation by President Friedrich Ebert that lasted until February 1924. In October 1923, when the Communist Party of Germany entered the Social Democratic-led governments of Saxony and Thuringia with hidden revolutionary intentions, Stresemann used a Reichsexekution to send troops into the two states to remove the Communists from the governments. By this time, Stresemann was convinced that accepting the Republic and reaching an understanding with the Allies on the reparations issue was the only way for Germany to gain the breathing room it needed to rebuild its battered economy. He also wished to see the withdrawal of all foreign troops from the Allied-occupied Rhineland, as he wrote to Wilhelm, the former German Crown Prince on 23 July 1923: "The most important objective of German politics is the liberation of German territory from French and Belgian occupation. First, we must remove the strangler from our throat".

Hyperinflation in the Weimar Republic reached its peak in November 1923. Since Germany was unable to pay the idled workers in the occupied Ruhr any other way, more and more money was printed, which finally led to hyperinflation. The Stresemann government introduced a new currency, the Rentenmark, to end hyperinflation. Although Stresemann, like nearly every other German politician, cursed the Treaty as a Diktat, he had come to believe that Germany would never win relief from its terms unless it made a good-faith effort to fulfill them. To his mind, this would convince the Allies that the reparations bill was truly beyond Germany's capacity. The effort paid off; the Allies began to take a look at reforming the reparations scheme.

In early November 1923, partly because of the reaction to the overthrow of the SPD/KPD governments in Saxony and Thuringia, the Social Democrats withdrew from his reshuffled government and, after he lost a confidence vote on 23 November 1923, Stresemann and his cabinet resigned.

=== Foreign minister 1923–1929 ===
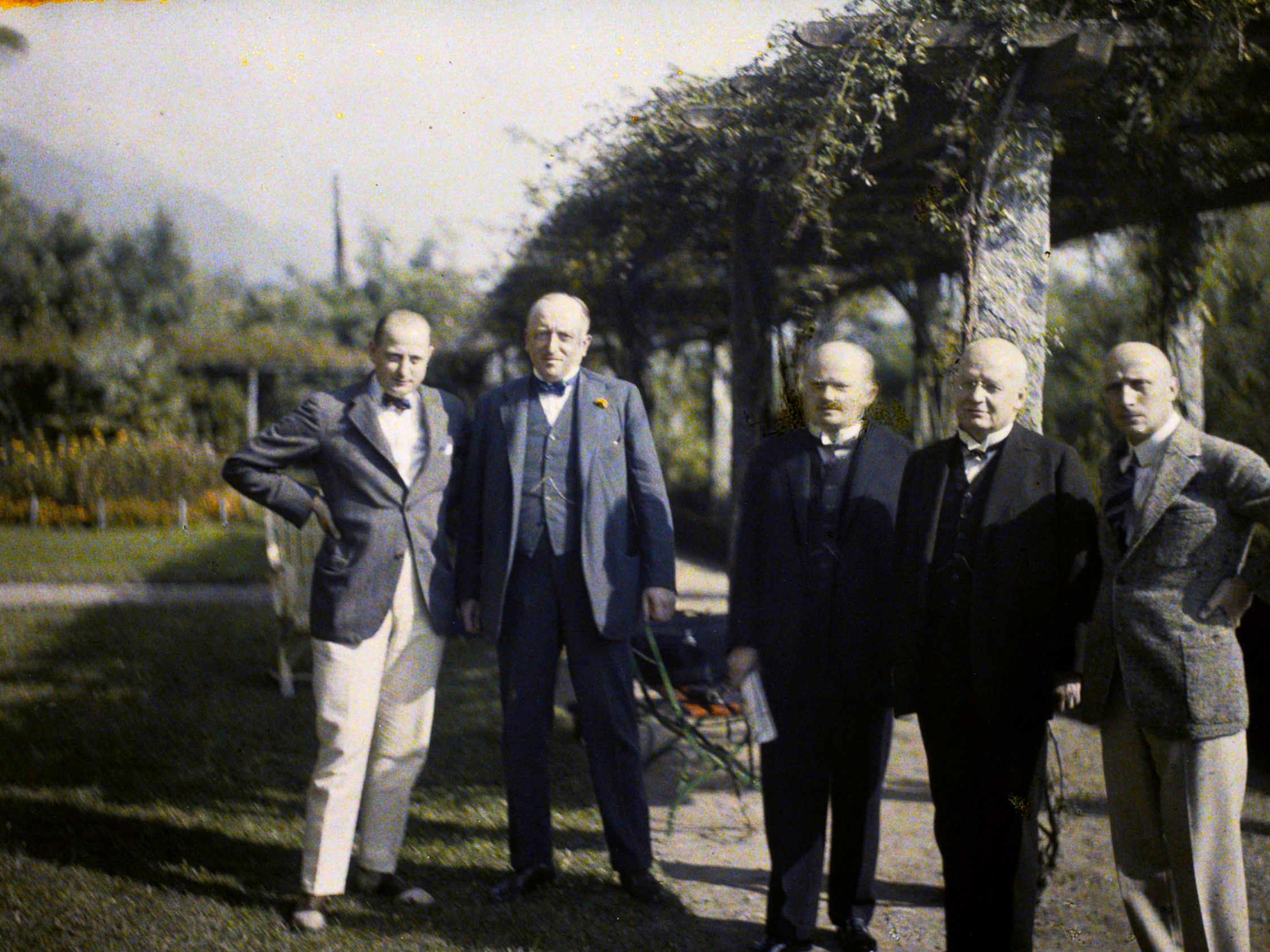
Stresemann (middle) with the German delegation at the 1925 Locarno Treaties, Autochrome by Roger Dumas

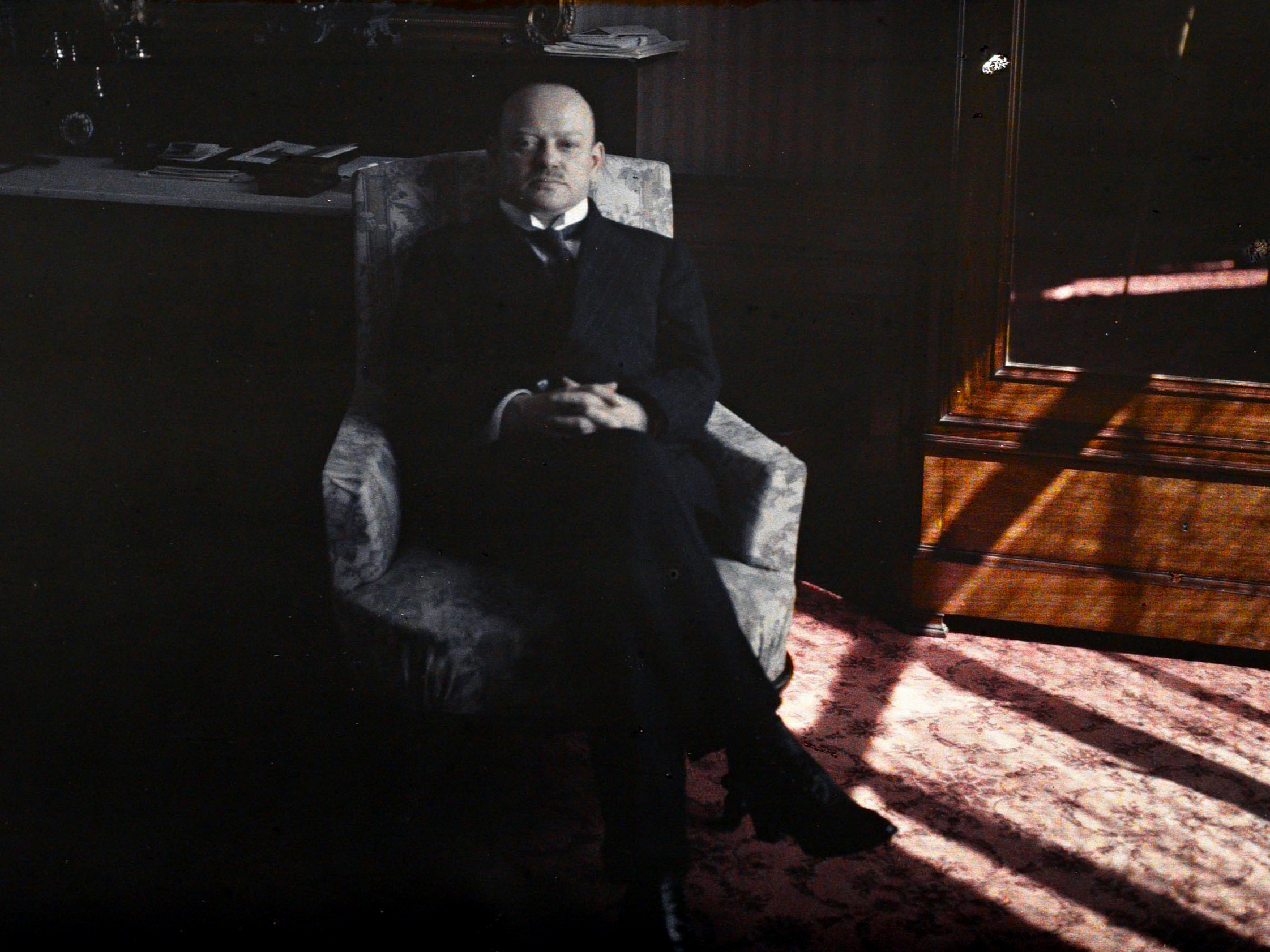
1929 Autochrome of Stresemann in The Hague by Stéphane Passet

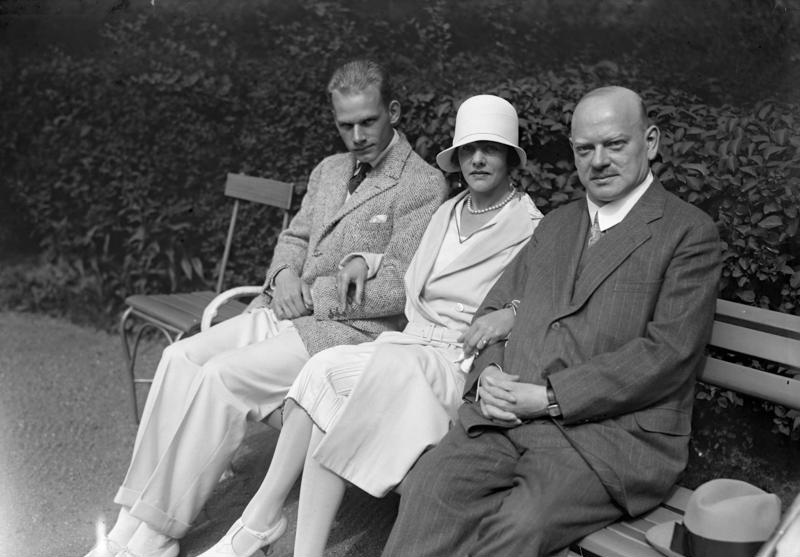
Stresemann in September 1929 shortly before his death with his wife Käte and son Wolfgang

Stresemann remained as foreign minister in the government of his successor, Wilhelm Marx from the Centre Party, and for the rest of his life in seven additional successive governments ranging from the centre-right to the centre-left. His first notable achievement was the Dawes Plan of 1924, which reduced Germany's overall reparations commitment, reorganised the Reichsbank and ended the occupation of the Ruhr. With President Friedrich Ebert, he secured the appointment of Hjalmar Schacht as the new president of the Reichsbank. Schacht implemented the Dawes Plan and managed the successful effort to end hyperinflation, despite his reservations about Germany's growing foreign debt under Stresemann's economic policies. The successful negotiation of the Dawes Plan provided hope for Stresemann's foreign policy strategy emphasizing Germany's remaining economic soft power, since the co-author of the plan, Owen D. Young, was the chairman of General Electric and a major trading partner with the German firm AEG.

After Sir Austen Chamberlain became British Foreign Secretary, Stresemann sought a British guarantee of Germany's post-war border with France and Belgium. The issue remained unresolved because a prospective Anglo-American guarantee had not been implemented due to the United States' failure to ratify the Treaty of Versailles. Stresemann later wrote, "Chamberlain had never been our friend. His first act was to attempt to restore the old Entente through a three-power alliance of England, France and Belgium, directed against Germany. German diplomacy faced a catastrophic situation."

Stresemann conceived the idea that Germany would guarantee its western borders and pledge never to invade Belgium and France again. Germany was in no position at the time to attack, as Stresemann wrote to the ex-Crown Prince: "The renunciation of a military conflict with France has only a theoretical significance, in so far as there is no possibility of a war with France." Stresemann negotiated the Locarno Treaties with Britain, France, Italy, and Belgium. On the third day of negotiations, Stresemann told French Foreign Secretary Aristide Briand of the concessions Germany wanted in order to be able to have something concrete to show the sceptical German public in exchange for the Locarno Pact. The concessions included a reduction in the number of occupation troops in the Rhineland, shortening the length of the occupation and no permanent inspection of German disarmament. As Stresemann recorded, Briand "almost fell off his sofa. [...] He was astonished at my boldness, which indeed he thought had gone too far. If my views were to be accepted, the Treaty of Versailles might as well cease to exist." Nevertheless, Briand expressed his understanding. After signing the Locarno Treaties, he indicated that they "should consider everything for the realisation for which we hoped. [...] In a general way, Dr Stresemann's list did not a priori seem impossible of realisation."

The Treaties were signed in October 1925 at Locarno. Germany officially recognised its post-World War I western border for the first time, guaranteed peace with France and Belgium and pledged to observe the demilitarisation of the Rhineland. If the terms of the treaty were broken, the signatories (including Britain) promised to come to the aid of the country against which the violation had taken place. Stresemann was not willing to conclude a similar treaty with the Second Polish Republic: "There will be no Locarno of the east" he said in 1925. He hoped to use Polish economic difficulties to force a peaceful adjustment of the Polish border in Germany's favour. However, as part of the Locarno Treaties, he signed arbitration agreements with both Poland and the First Czechoslovak Republic to ensure that any future conflict would be settled by impartial arbitration rather than by the use of force. By 1929, his policy was "detente with Poland" and strengthening good economic relationships.

After this reconciliation with the Versailles powers, Stresemann moved to improve relations with the Soviet Union. He said to Nikolay Krestinsky in June 1925, as recorded in his diary: "I had said I would not come to conclude a treaty with Russia so long as our political situation in the other direction was not cleared up, as I wanted to answer the question whether we had a treaty with Russia in the negative." The Treaty of Berlin signed in April 1926 reaffirmed and strengthened the Treaty of Rapallo signed in 1922. Germany and the Soviet Union pledged neutrality in the event of an attack on the other by a third party for five years.

In September 1926, as planned during the negotiations for the Locarno Treaties, Germany was admitted to the League of Nations as a permanent member of the Executive Council. Stresemann was co-winner with Aristide Briand of the 1926 Nobel Peace Prize for their work on Locarno. Stresemann's success owed much to his friendly personal character and his willingness to be pragmatic. He was close personal friends with many influential foreigners, most notably Aristide Briand.

Stresemann wrote to the ex-Crown Prince about how Germany could use its position in the League of Nations: "All the questions which to-day preoccupy the German people can be transformed into as many vexations for the Entente by a skilful orator before the League of Nations." Since League resolutions had to be unanimous, Germany could gain concessions from other countries on modifications of the Polish border or political union with Austria, as other countries needed its vote. Germany could act as "the spokesman of the whole German cultural community".

Germany signed the Kellogg-Briand Pact in August 1928. It renounced the use of violence to resolve international conflicts. Although Stresemann did not propose the pact, Germany's adherence convinced many people that Weimar Germany was a Germany that could be reasoned with. This new insight was instrumental in the Young Plan of February 1929, which led to more reductions in German reparations payments.

Stresemann was not, however, in any sense pro-French. His main preoccupation was to free Germany from the burden of reparations payments to France, imposed by the Treaty of Versailles. His strategy for this was to forge close economic ties with the United States. The U.S. was Germany's main source of capital and raw materials, and one of Germany's largest export markets for manufactured goods. Germany's economic recovery was thus in the interests of the U.S., and gave the U.S. an incentive to help Germany resolve the reparations burden. The Dawes and Young Plans were the result of this strategy. New York bankers loaned large sums to Germany, which used the dollars to pay reparations to France and Britain, which in turn paid the war loans they owed to Washington. Stresemann also hoped to use the United States' new financial involvement in the German economy to incentivise the nation's financial and political institutions to support reform of reparations. This paid off in 1928 when Federal Reserve Chairman Benjamin Strong supported the development of the Young Plan. Stresemann had a close relationship with Herbert Hoover, who was secretary of commerce in 1921–1928 and president from 1929. This strategy worked remarkably well until it was derailed by the Great Depression after Stresemann's death.

During his period in the foreign ministry, Stresemann came more and more to accept the Republic, which he had at first rejected. By the mid-1920s, having contributed much to a (temporary) consolidation of the feeble democratic order, Stresemann was regarded as a Vernunftrepublikaner, (republican by reason), someone who accepted the Republic as the least of all evils but was in his heart still loyal to the monarchy. The conservative opposition criticised him for supporting the Republic and fulfilling the demands of the Western powers. Along with Matthias Erzberger and others, he was attacked as a Erfüllungspolitiker ("fulfilment politician"). Indeed, some of the more conservative members of his own People's Party never really trusted him.

According to historian Gordon Craig:

No German statesman since Bismarck's time had demonstrated, as brilliantly as he was to do, the ability to sense danger and to avoid it by seizing and retaining the initiative, the gift of maintaining perspective and a sense of relative values in the midst of a changing diplomatic situation, and the talent for being more stubborn than his partners in negotiation and for refusing to allow their importunities to force him to accept second-best solutions.

== Health decline and death ==
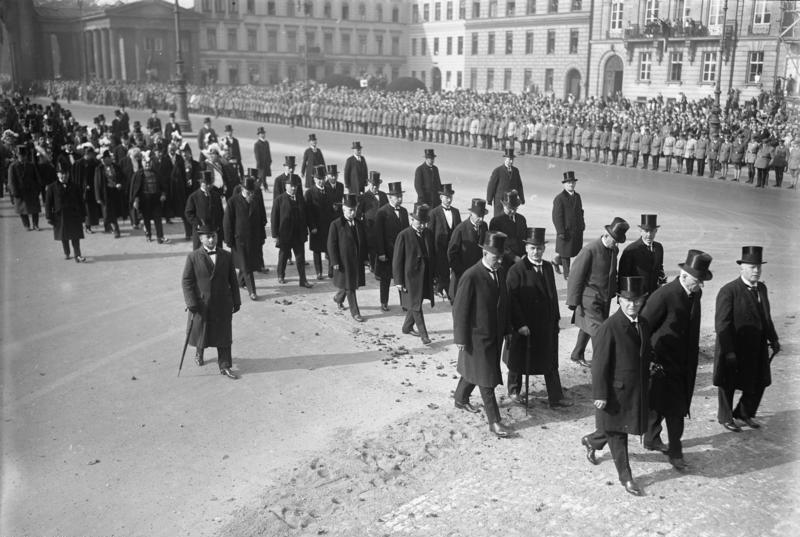
Stresemann's funeral

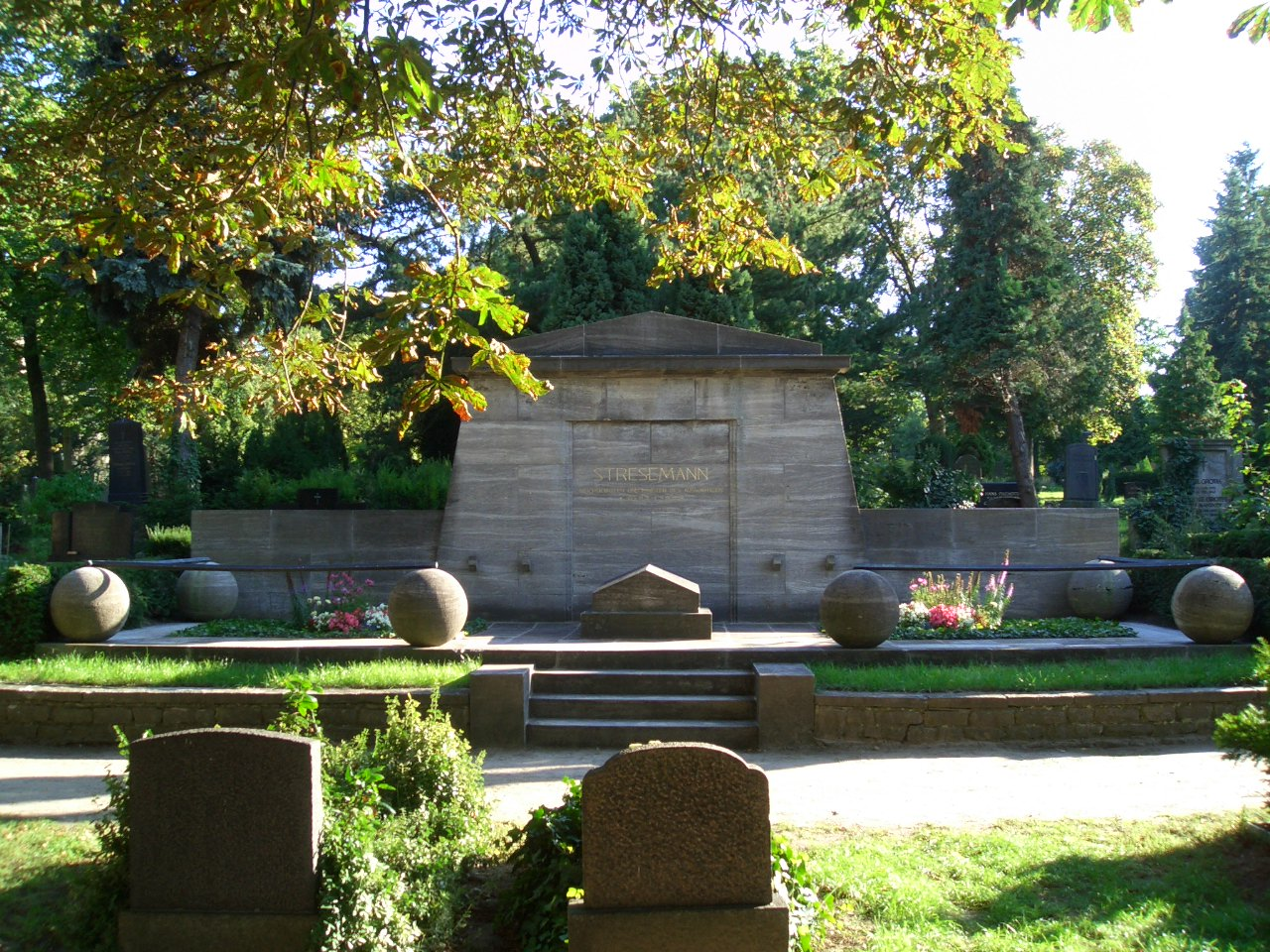
Stresemann's tomb at the Luisenstädtischer Friedhof Cemetery, Berlin

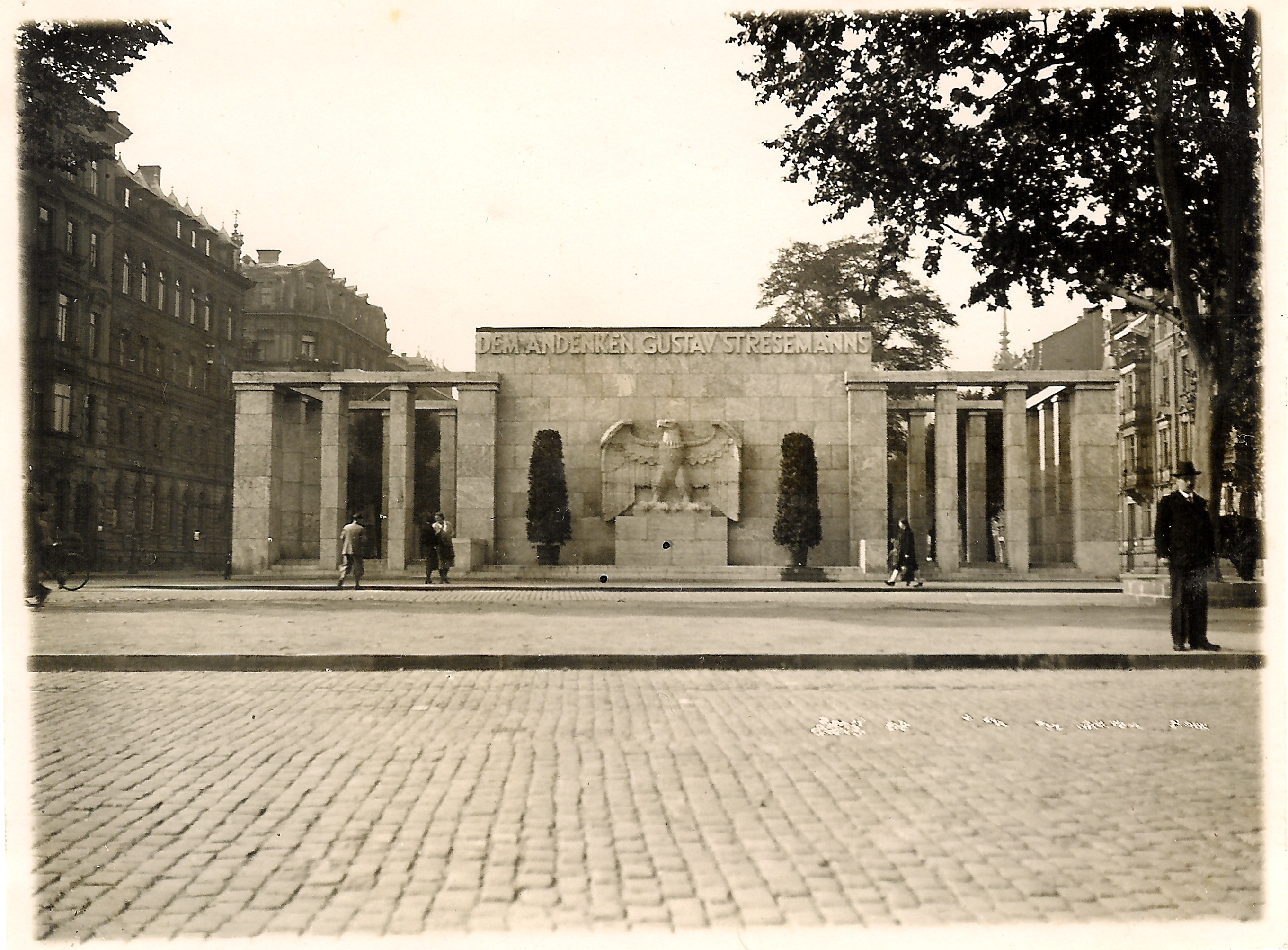
Gustav Stresemann Memorial in Mainz, October 1931. It was torn down by the Nazis in 1935.

In 1928, Stresemann's poor health worsened after the mainstream national conservative parties lost seats to the SPD in the 1928 German federal election. He successfully negotiated a grand coalition government led by Chancellor Hermann Müller in which he remained foreign secretary, but he was weakened in doing so.

Stresemann's Atlanticist foreign policy also began to show fractures after the Young Plan failed to reduce reparations annuities as far as hoped, or to establish a linkage between Allied war debts to the United States and German reparations payments. He seemed to secure a victory when Herbert Hoover won the 1928 United States presidential election, but Hoover's administration enacted a protectionist trade policy to assist U.S. agriculture, and after Stresemann's later death, would sign the Smoot–Hawley Tariff Act. The new trade barriers lessened U.S. credit to Germany.

Discontent with the Young Plan led to the growth of far-right movements rejecting liberal democracy, such as the Nazi Party, with Stresemann weakening himself further by keeping the right wing of the DVP under control. Stresemann responded to worsening trans-Atlantic relations by pursuing negotiations for closer relations with the United Kingdom and France, and in 1929, he spoke positively of the idea of European integration to form a united political and economic counterweight against the United States. He died of a series of strokes on 3 October 1929 at the age of 51, before he could make any further diplomatic progress towards this idea. His death came just hours after convincing the Reichstag to accept the Young Plan. His gravesite is situated in the Luisenstadt Cemetery at Südstern in Berlin Kreuzberg, and includes work by the German sculptor Hugo Lederer.

== Personal life ==
Stresemann and his wife Käte had two sons: Wolfgang, who later became intendant of the Berlin Philharmonic, and Joachim Stresemann.

Stresemann was a Freemason initiated in the Masonic lodge Frederick the Great in Berlin in 1923. His Masonic membership was generally known to his contemporaries, and he was criticised by German nationalists as a "lodge politician".

== Fashion ==
Stresemann popularised the style of substituting a short dark lounge-suit jacket for a morning coat but otherwise wearing morning dress for men's day wear. The look became so identified with Stresemann that such outfits are often called "Stresemanns".

== See also ==
- Gustav Stresemann Institute
- List of people from Berlin

== Bibliography ==
- Cornebise, Alfred E. "Gustav Stresemann and the Ruhr Occupation: the Making of a Statesman." European Studies Review 2.1 (1972): pp. 43–67
- Enssle, Manfred J (1980). Stresemann's Territorial Revisionism: Germany, Belgium, and the Eupen-Malmédy Question 1919–1929. Steiner. ISBN 978-3-515-02959-9.
- Evans, Richard J. (2003). The Coming of the Third Reich. New York City: Penguin Books. ISBN 978-0141009759.
- Feuchtwanger, Edgar. "Hitler, Stresemann and the Discontinuity of German Foreign Policy." History Review (1999) 35:14+ online
- Feuchtwanger, Edgar. From Weimar to Hitler: Germany, 1918–1933 (2nd ed. 1995)
- Fischer, Wolfgang C. (2010). German Hyperinflation 1922/23: A Law and Economics Approach. Books on Demand. ISBN 978-3-89936-931-1.
- de Hoyos, Arturo; Morris, S. Brent, eds. (2004). Freemasonry in Context: History, Ritual, Controversy. Lexington Books. ISBN 978-0739107812.
- Grathwol, Robert P. (1980). Stresemann and the DNVP: Reconciliation or Revenge in German Foreign Policy. Regent Press of Kansas | Out of Print. ISBN 9780700601998.
- Jacobson, Jon. Locarno diplomacy: Germany and the west, 1925–1929 (Princeton University Press, 1972)
- Machalka, Wolfgang, and Marshall Lee, eds. Gustav Stresemann (1982), essays by scholars
- Mulligan, William (2005). The creation of the modern German Army: General Walther Reinhardt and the Weimar Republic, 1914–1930. Monographs in German History. Vol. 12. p. 173. ISBN 978-157181908-6.
- Nekrich, Aleksandr Moiseevich. Pariahs, partners, predators: German-Soviet relations, 1922–1941 (Columbia University Press, 1997)
- Schwarzschild, Leopold (1942). World in Trance. Translated by Norbert, Guterman. New York: L. B. Fischer Publishing Corporation.
- Shirer, William L. (1990). The Rise and Fall of the Third Reich: A History of Nazi Germany. Simon & Schuster. ISBN 978-0-671-72868-7.
- Slavėnas, Julius P. (1972). "Stresemann and Lithuania in the Nineteen Twenties". Lithuanian Quarterly Journal of Arts and Sciences. 18 (4 – Winter 1972). Archived from the original on 27 July 2020.
- Steiner, Zara. The Lights that Failed: European International History 1919–1933 (Oxford, 2005); 960 pp.
- Thimme, Annelise. "Stresemann and Locarno" in Hans Wilhelm Gatzke, ed., European diplomacy between two wars, 1919–1939 (1972) pp. 73–93 online
- Tooze, Adam (2007) [2006]. The Wages of Destruction: The Making & Breaking of the Nazi Economy (PDF). London: Penguin Books. ISBN 978-0-14-100348-1.
- Turner, Henry Ashby (1963). Stresemann and the Politics of the Weimar Republic. Princeton, New Jersey: Princeton University Press. online, focuses on domestic politics
- Wheeler-Bennett, John (1964). The Nemesis of Power; The German Army in Politics, 1918–1945 (2nd ed.). London: Macmillan Publishers. OCLC 711310.
- Wright, Jonathan (1997). "Gustav Stresemann: Liberal or Realist?". In Otte, Thomas G; Pagedas, Constantine A. (eds.). Personalities, War and Diplomacy: Essays in International History. London: Frank Cass. ISBN 978-0-7146-4818-7.
- Wright, Jonathan (2002). Gustav Stresemann: Weimar's Greatest Statesman. Oxford: Oxford University Press. ISBN 978-0-19-821949-1.
- Wright, Jonathan. "Gustav Stresemann: Weimar's Greatest Statesman." History Today (Nov 2002), 52#11 pp. 53–59
- Wright, Jonathan. "Stresemann and Weimar" History Today (Oct 1989) 39#10, pp. 35–41

=== Historiography ===
- Enssle, Manfred J. "Stresemann's Diplomacy Fifty Years after Locarno: Some Recent Perspectives." Historical Journal 20.4 (1977): 937–948. JSTOR 2638415
- Gatzke, Hans W. "Gustav Stresemann: A Bibliographical Article." Journal of Modern History 36#1 (1964): 1-13. JSTOR 1874422.
- Grathwol, Robert. "Stresemann revisited." European Studies Review 7.3 (1977): 341–352
- Grathwol, Robert. “Gustav Stresemann: Reflections on His Foreign Policy.” Journal of Modern History, 45#1 (1973), pp. 52–70. JSTOR 1877593

=== Primary sources ===
- Stresemann, Gustav. Essays and speeches on various subjects (1968) online
- Sutton, Eric ed. Gustav Stresemann his diaries, letters and papers (1935) online

=== In German ===
- Becker, Hartmuth: Gustav Stresemann: Reden und Schriften. Politik – Geschichte – Literatur, 1897–1926. Duncker & Humblot, Berlin, 2008, ISBN 978-3-428-12139-7.
- Birkelund, John P.: Gustav Stresemann. Patriot und Staatsmann. Eine Biographie. Europa-Verlag, Hamburg, 2003, ISBN 3-203-75511-4
- Braun, Bernd: Die Reichskanzler der Weimarer Republik. Zwölf Lebensläufe in Bildern. Düsseldorf, 2011, ISBN 978-3-7700-5308-7, pp. 270–303
- Kolb, Eberhard (2003). Gustav Stresemann. Munich: C. H. Beck. ISBN 978-3-406-48015-7.
- Kolb, Eberhard: Stresemann, Gustav. In: Neue Deutsche Biographie (NDB). Band 25, Duncker & Humblot, Berlin 2013, ISBN 978-3-428-11206-7, S. 545–547 (Digitalisat (PDF; 3,7 MB))
- Pohl, Karl Heinrich (2015). Gustav Stresemann. Biografie eines Grenzgängers. Göttingen: Vandenhoeck & Ruprecht. ISBN 978-3-525-30082-4.

Political offices
| Preceded by Hans von Rosenberg | Minister of Foreign Affairs; 1923–1929 | Succeeded by Julius Curtius |
| Preceded by Wilhelm Cuno | Chancellor of Germany; 14 August – 23 November 1923 | Succeeded by Wilhelm Marx |
