= Ascot tie =

Neckband with wide pointed wings

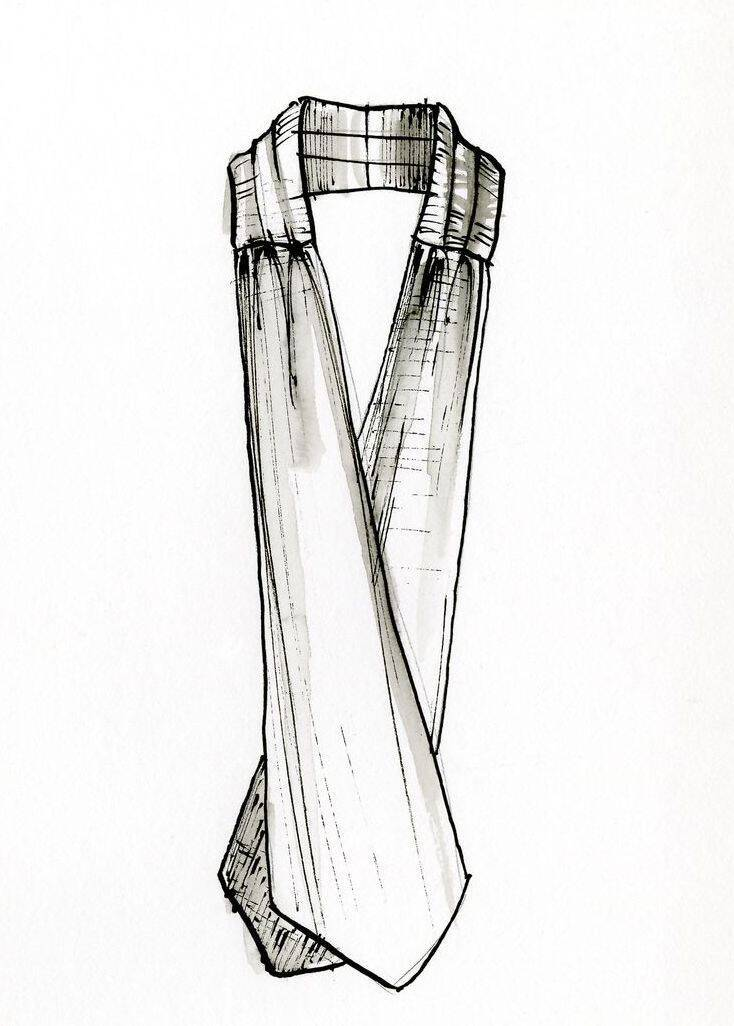
Sketch of an ascot showing its shape before it is tied

An ascot tie, or simply ascot, is an article of neckwear with wide pointed wings at the end, wrapped around the neck and draped down the chest to cover the front placket and button line of a dress shirt. This wider relative of the necktie, an ascot tie is folded over, and usually fastened with an ascot tie pin, tie clip, or an ascot ring to secure the folds beneath the knot. It is usually reserved for formal wear with morning dress for daytime weddings being worn with a cutaway morning coat and striped grey formal trousers. Ascots are traditionally made of patterned silk. While earlier cravats were only found in certain colors due to the difficulty of obtaining and manufacturing pigments and dyes, today's ascot ties can be found in nearly any colour, but are usually in neutral tones to match with the dress shirt and suit jacket or dinner jacket (tuxedo), with which they might be paired.

A similar form of neckwear is called a modern cravat, worn for different occasions than an ascot. Both ascot ties and cravats are in the lexicography of British English and American English; the terms are not interchangeable. The key distinction between an ascot tie and a modern cravat is how they are worn around the neck—an ascot is tied in a distinctive knot, while a modern cravat forms a solid band across the neck. Generally, an ascot is worn around a buttoned winged shirt collar and tied at the front, whereas a modern cravat is worn untied underneath an unbuttoned, open shirt collar.

== Derivations ==
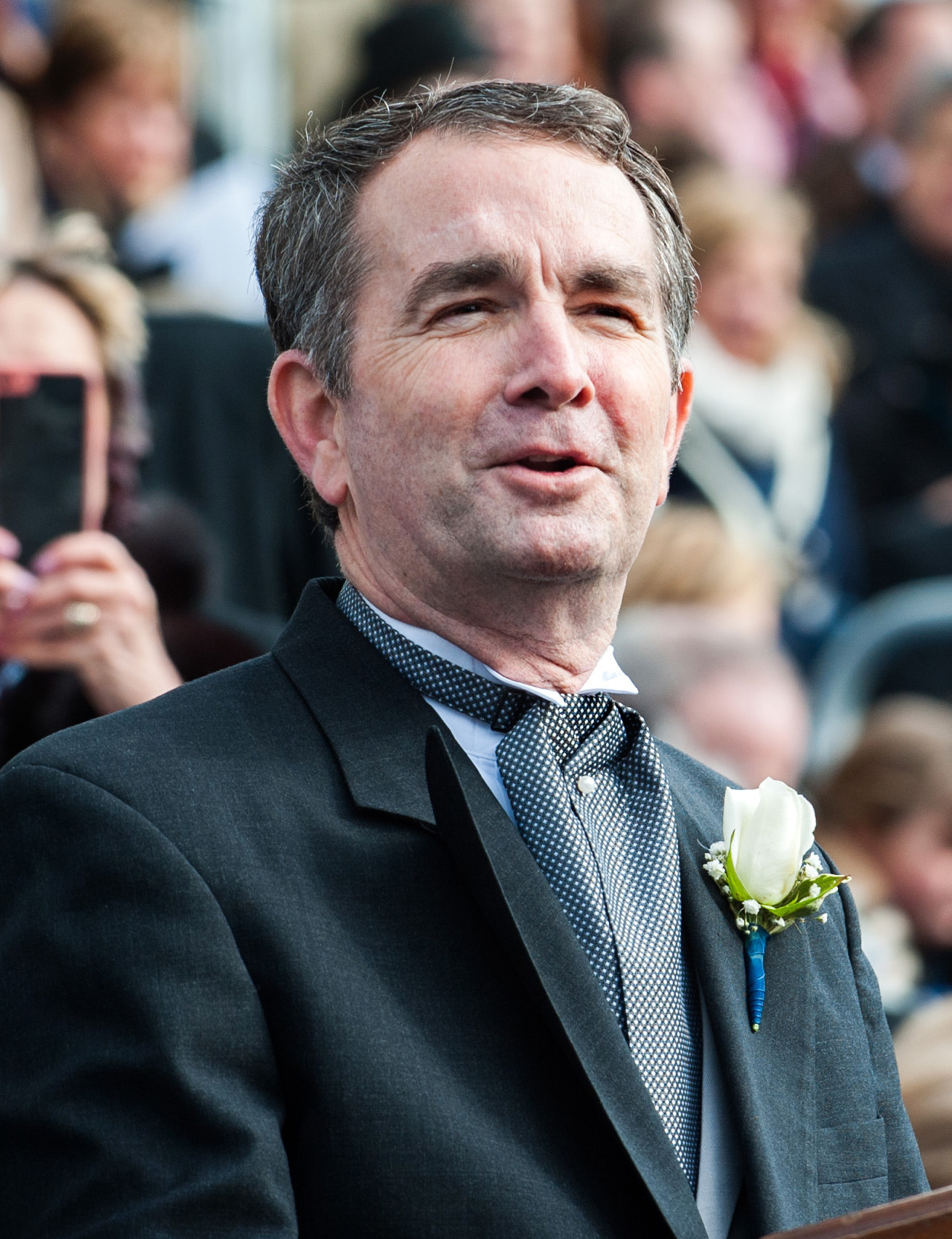
Ralph Northam, then the governor of the US state of Virginia, speaking while wearing a morning suit with an ascot tie in 2018

=== "Ascot" ===
- The more formal wear neckwear is called the "ascot". This form of neckwear is usually tied with a form of knot at the neck, and either pinned at the centre with an ascot pin, or gathered with an ascot ring below the knot. When worn with an ascot pin, ascots can form a solid depression in the centre with winged edges near the suit lapels. However, when worn, ascot ties can form an appearance similar to very large neckties. Often, this form of neckwear is called a "formal cravat".

=== "Modern cravat" or "day cravat" ===
- The more casual dress form of neckwear is called a "modern cravat", or sometimes referred to as a "day cravat" to distinguish it from the cravat of the Regency period. The casual form is made from a thinner woven silk that is more comfortable when worn against the skin, often with ornate and colourful printed patterns. This cravat is tucked underneath the shirt collar, with the front button or front two buttons of the dress shirt undone. It is often difficult for others to distinguish the modern cravat from a scarf or a neckerchief, and therefore the day cravat is reserved for casual occasions, and is rarely seen at formal society functions. Sometimes, this form of neckwear is called an "ascot tie".

== History ==
The ascot tie is descended from the earlier type of cravat widespread in the early 19th century, most notably during the Regency Age, made of heavily starched linen and elaborately tied around the neck, popularised by Beau Brummell. Later in the 1880s, amongst the upper-middle-class in Europe men began to wear a more loosely tied version for formal daytime events with daytime full dress in frock coats or with morning coats. It remains a feature of morning dress for weddings today. The Royal Ascot horse race meeting at the Ascot Racecourse gave the ascot its name, although by the Edwardian era, such ties were no longer obligatory with morning dress at the Royal Ascot races, being supplanted by long ties. The ascot was still commonly worn for business with morning dress in the late 19th and very early 20th centuries.

== Civilian use ==
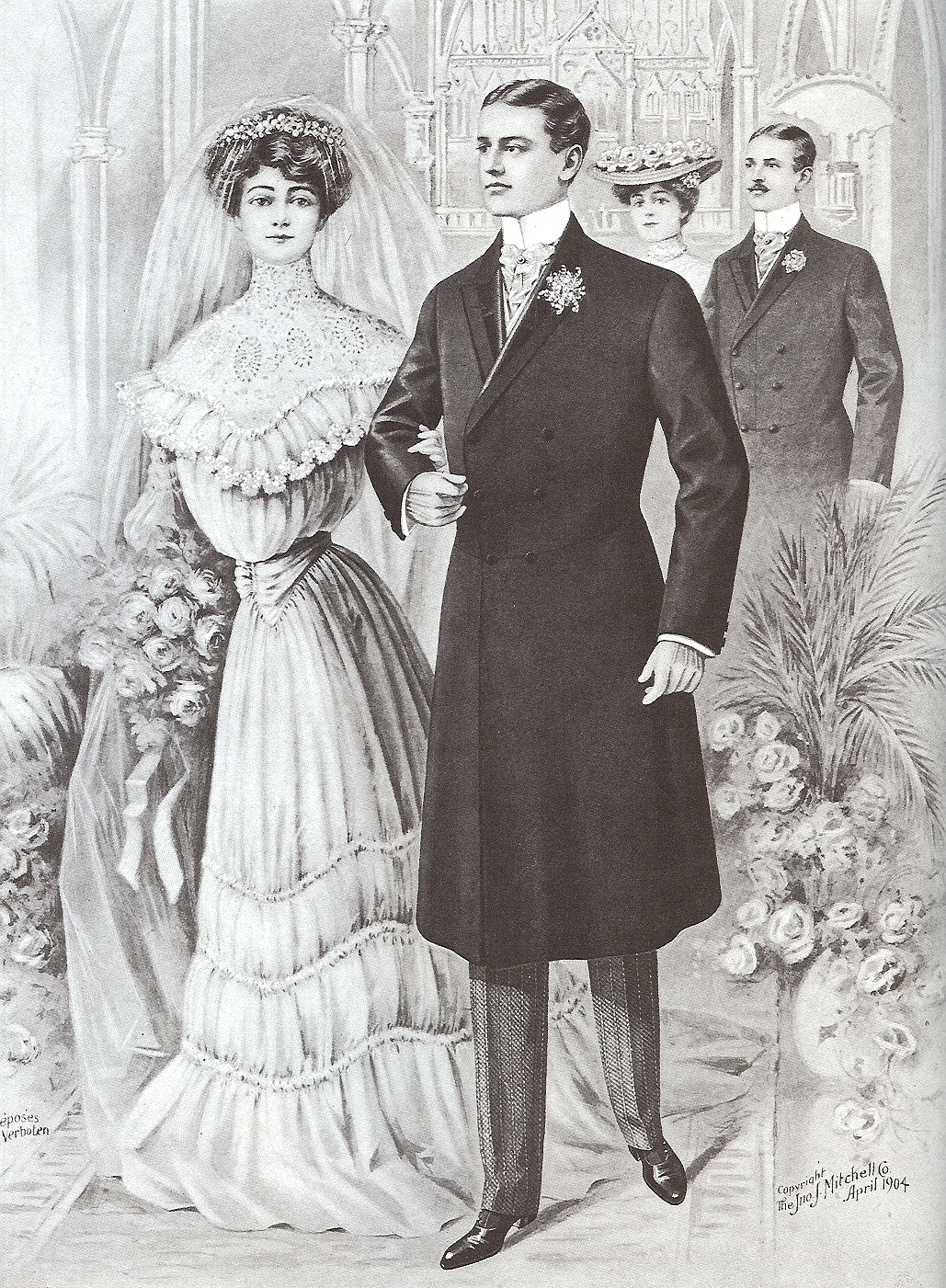
Ascot tie and pin (1904)

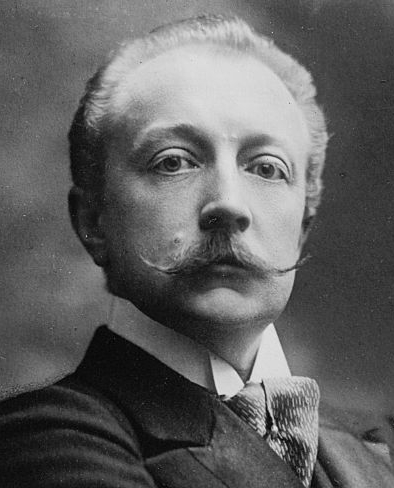
Boni de Castellane, unknown date

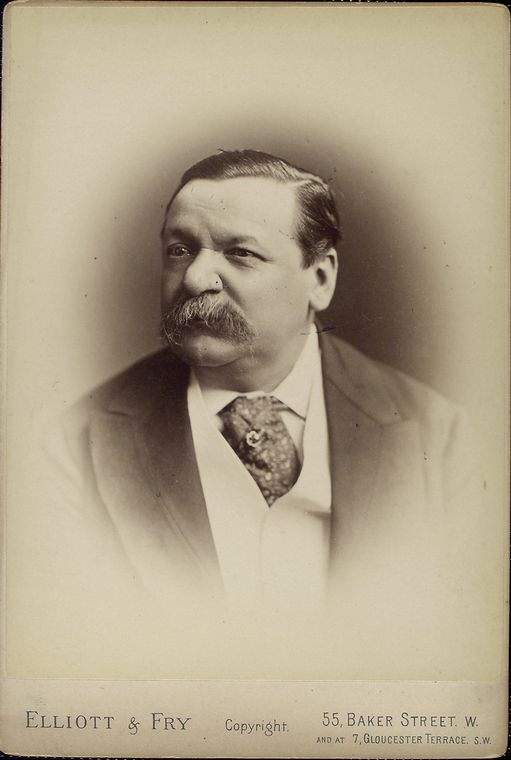
George Augustus Sala, British journalist; after 1863

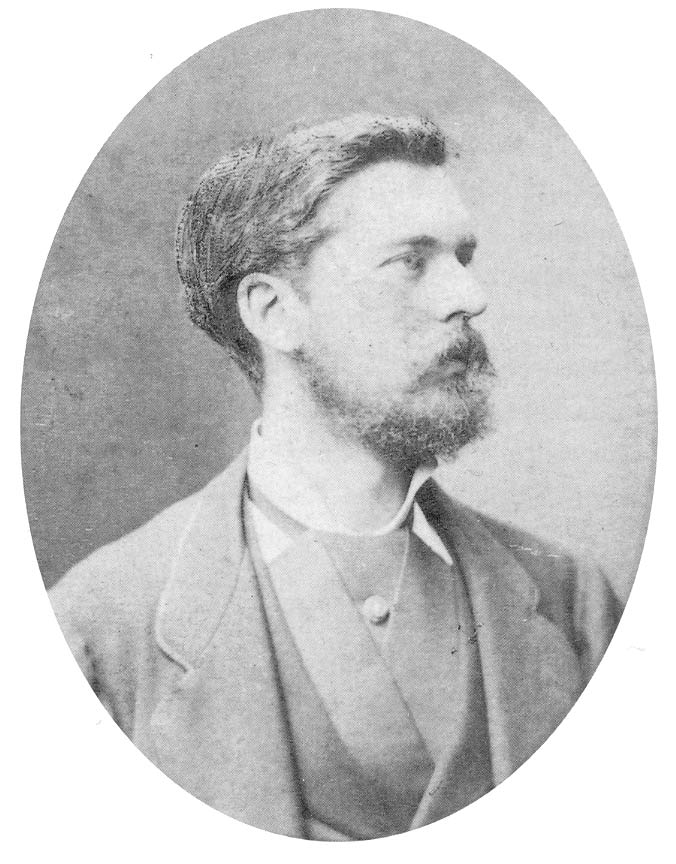
John Singer Sargent in a pleated Ascot tie c.1880

== Military use ==
Students at the United States Army Officer Candidate School wear ascot ties as part of their uniform, black for basic officer candidates, blue for intermediate candidates, and white for senior officer candidates. Pararescue trainees (upon completion of extended training day) are given a blue ascot.

In the United States Navy, the ascot is now worn for ceremonial purposes with "Enlisted Full Dress Whites" and "Enlisted Full Dress Blues" in the Ceremonial Guard.

In the Dutch Army, it is a part of the uniform, for barrack use, the cravat is often in the weapon colours, and with a logo, and when in combat uniform, a DPM or desert version is used.

Likewise, the Royal Danish Army employs a cravat for the ceremonial version of the barrack dress, its colours vary between each company.

Military use
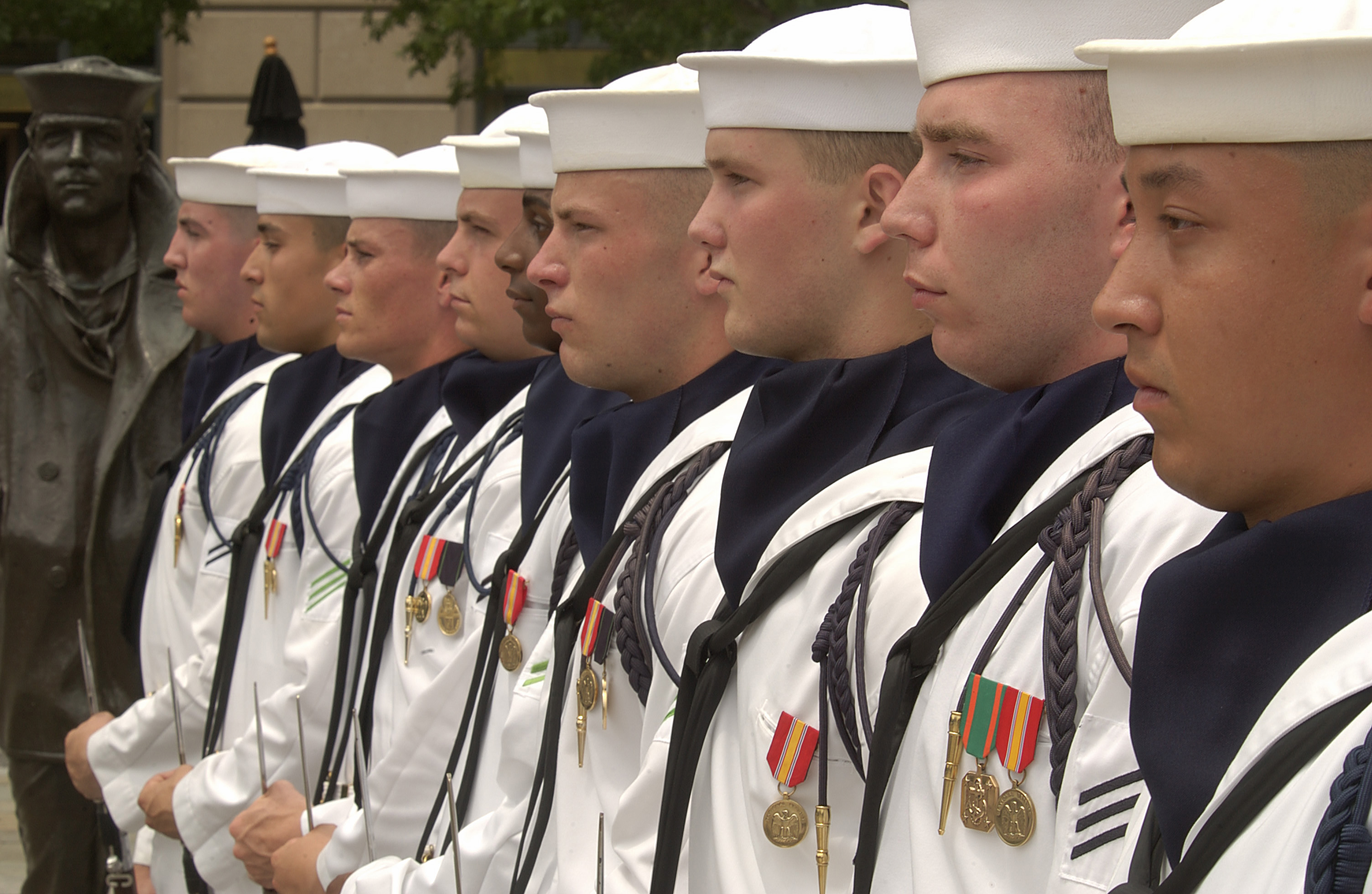
Blue ascot of US Navy "Enlisted Full Dress Whites"

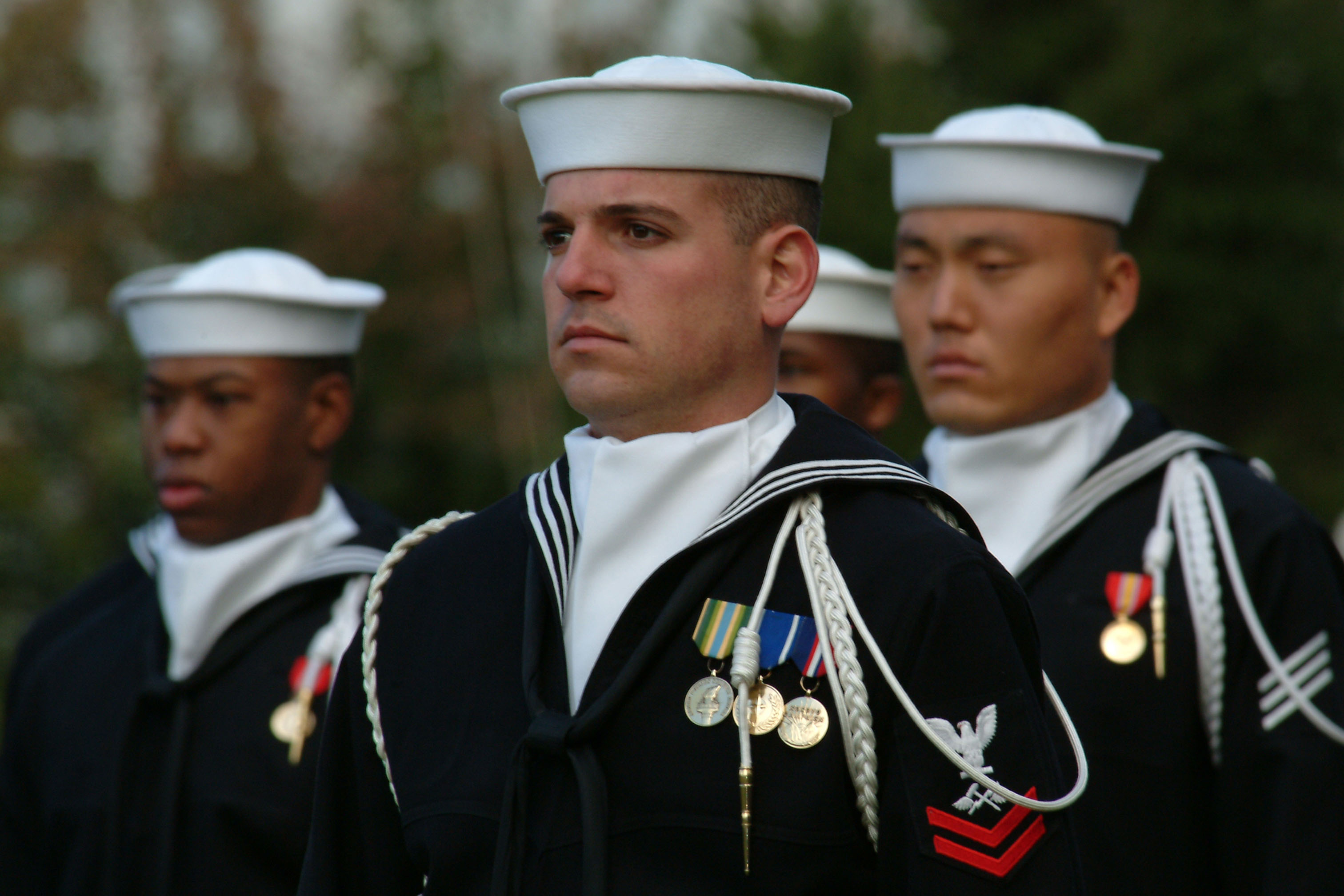
White ascot of US Navy "Enlisted Full Dress Blues"

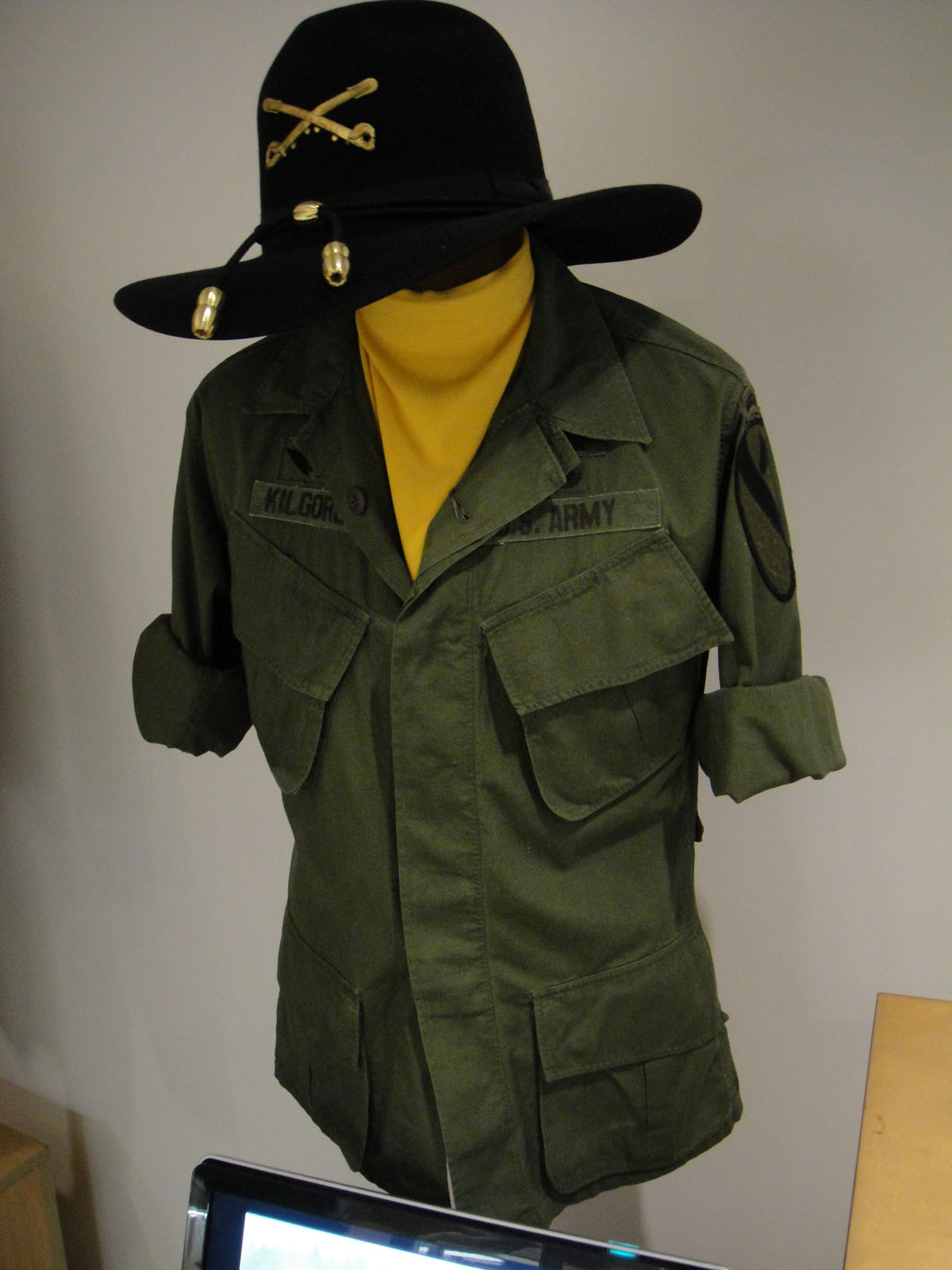
Robert Duvall's "Lt Col Kilgore" tropical combat coat and signature yellow ascot from the film Apocalypse Now

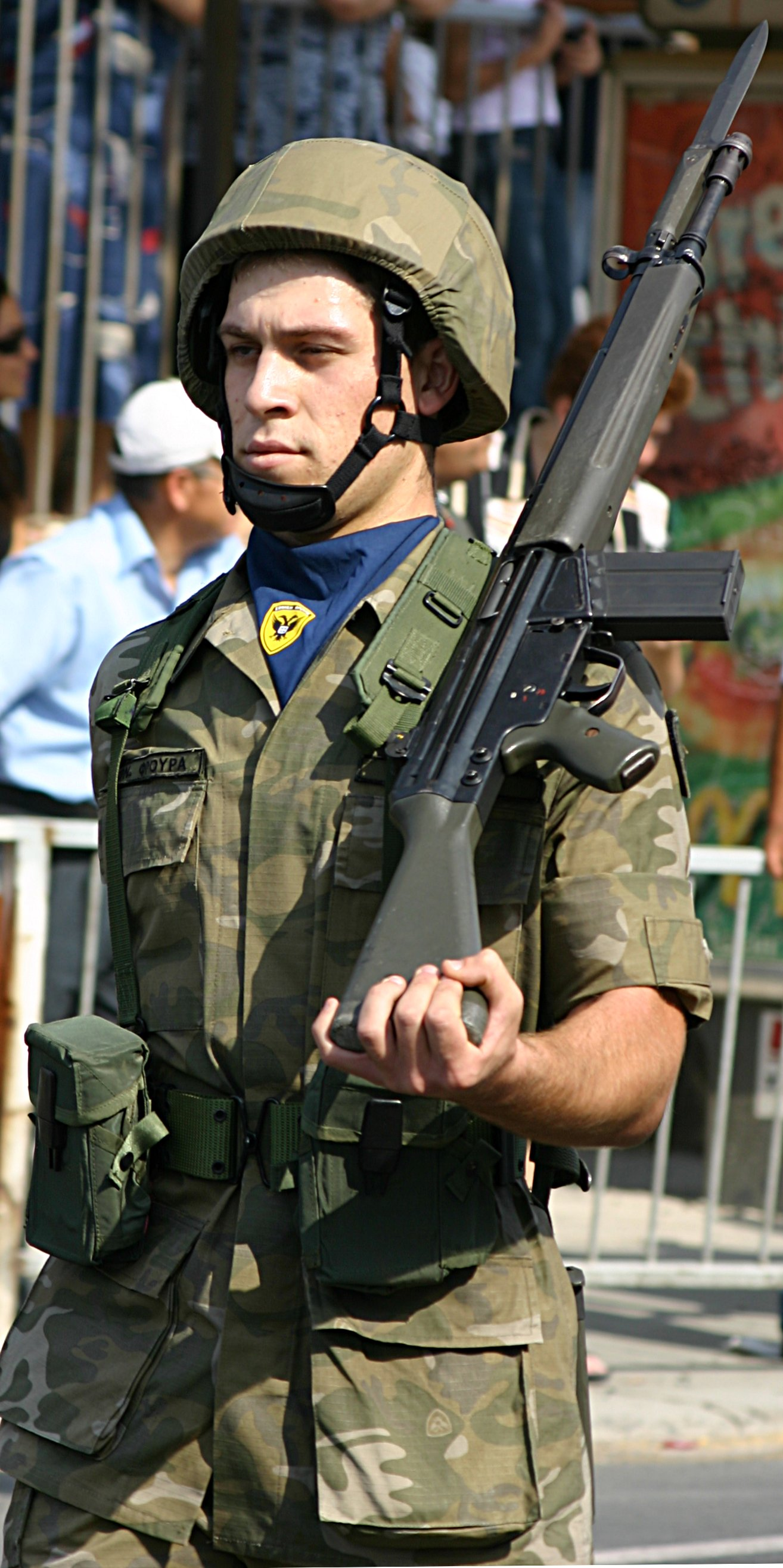
Cyprus National Guard soldier, wearing a blue cravat

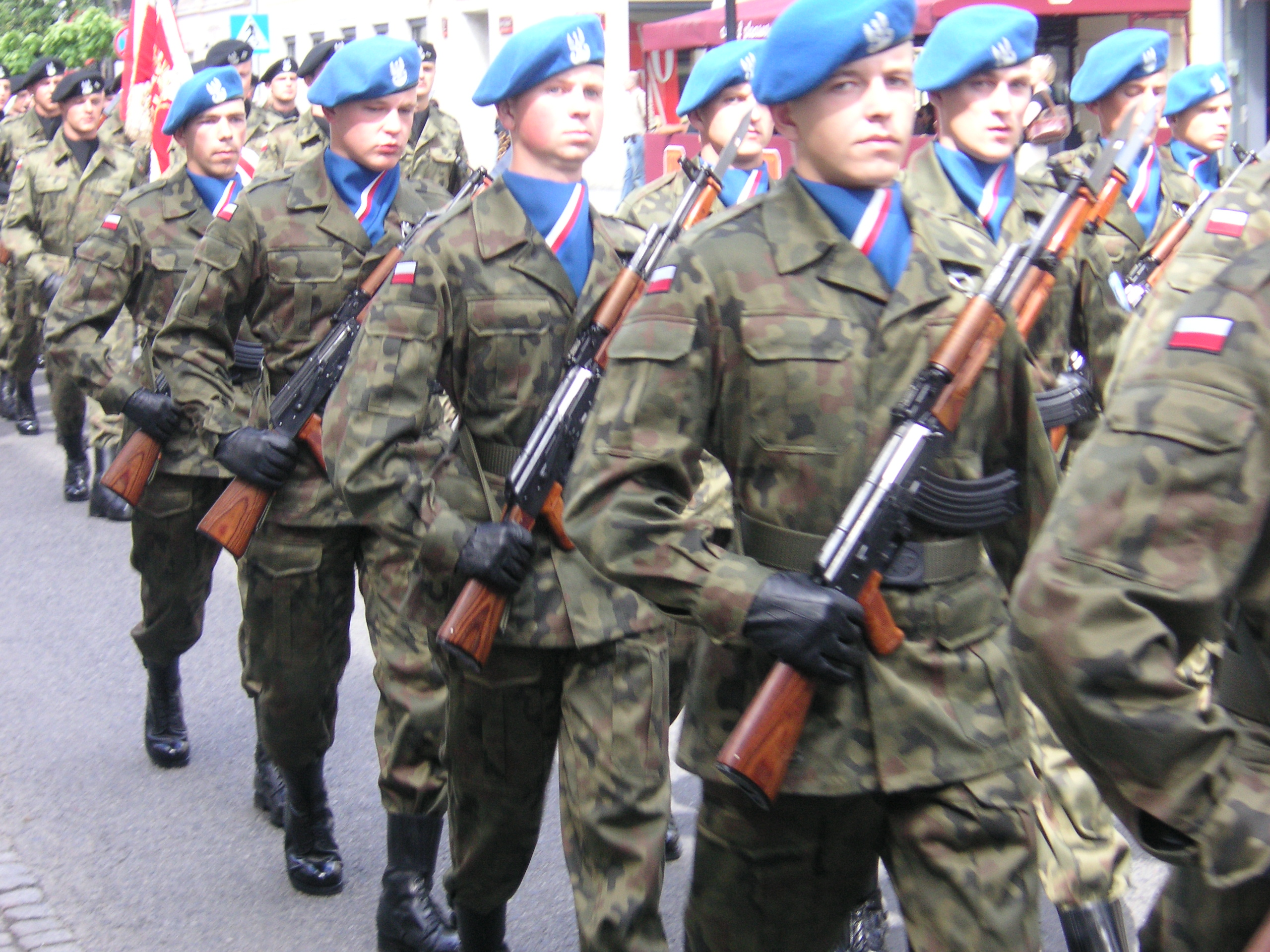
Soldiers of the Polish Army 7th Coastal Defense Brigade, wearing blue cravats striped with the flag of Poland

Danish soldier, wearing a red cravat

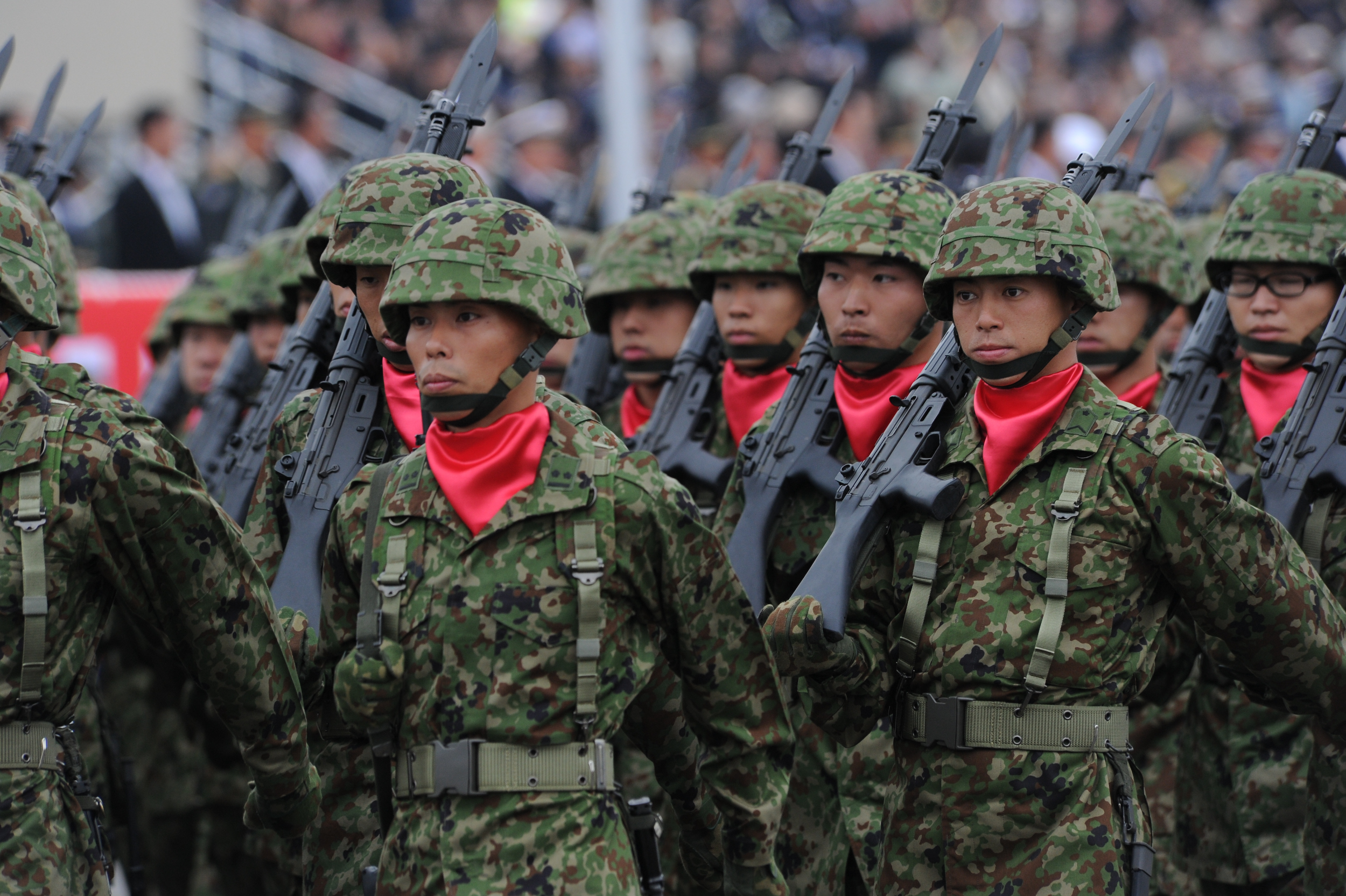
Japan Ground Self-Defense Force soldiers, wearing red cravats

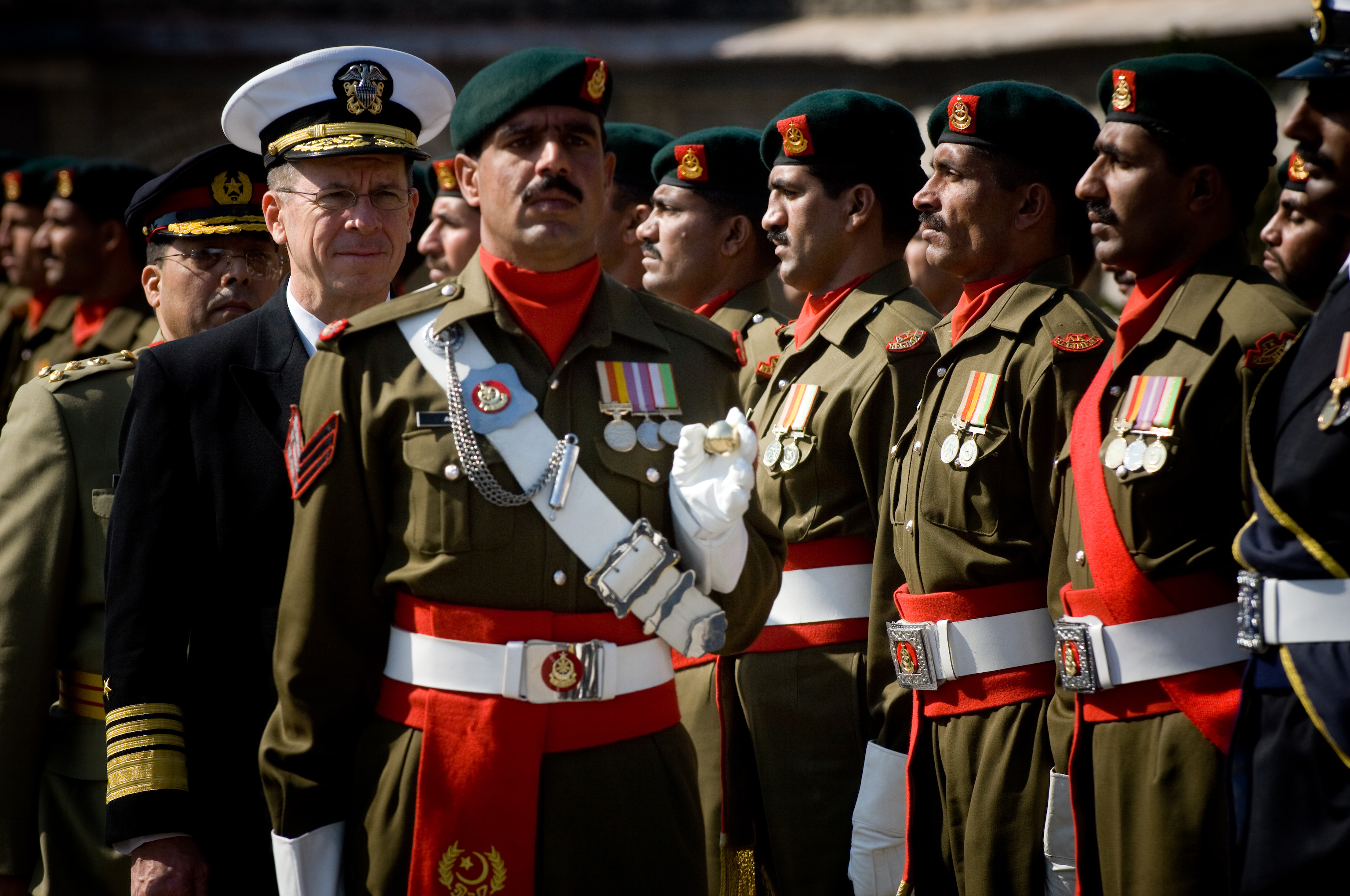
Pakistani infantrymen of the Azad Kashmir Regiment, wearing red cravats

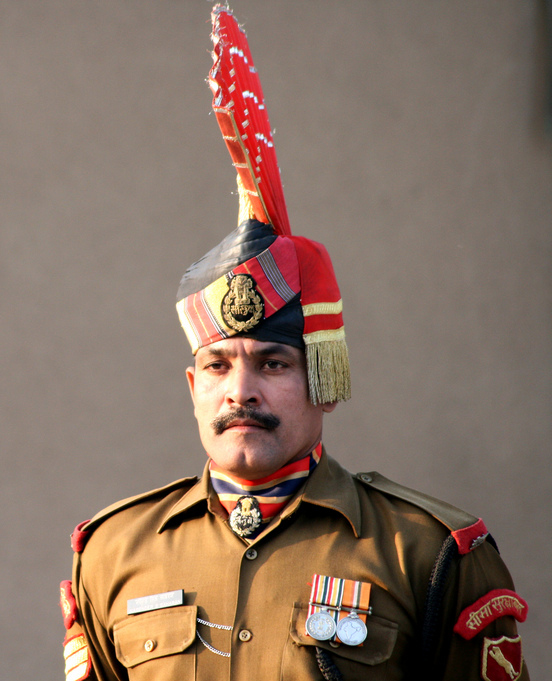
Sentry from the Indian Border Security Force, wearing a striped cravat

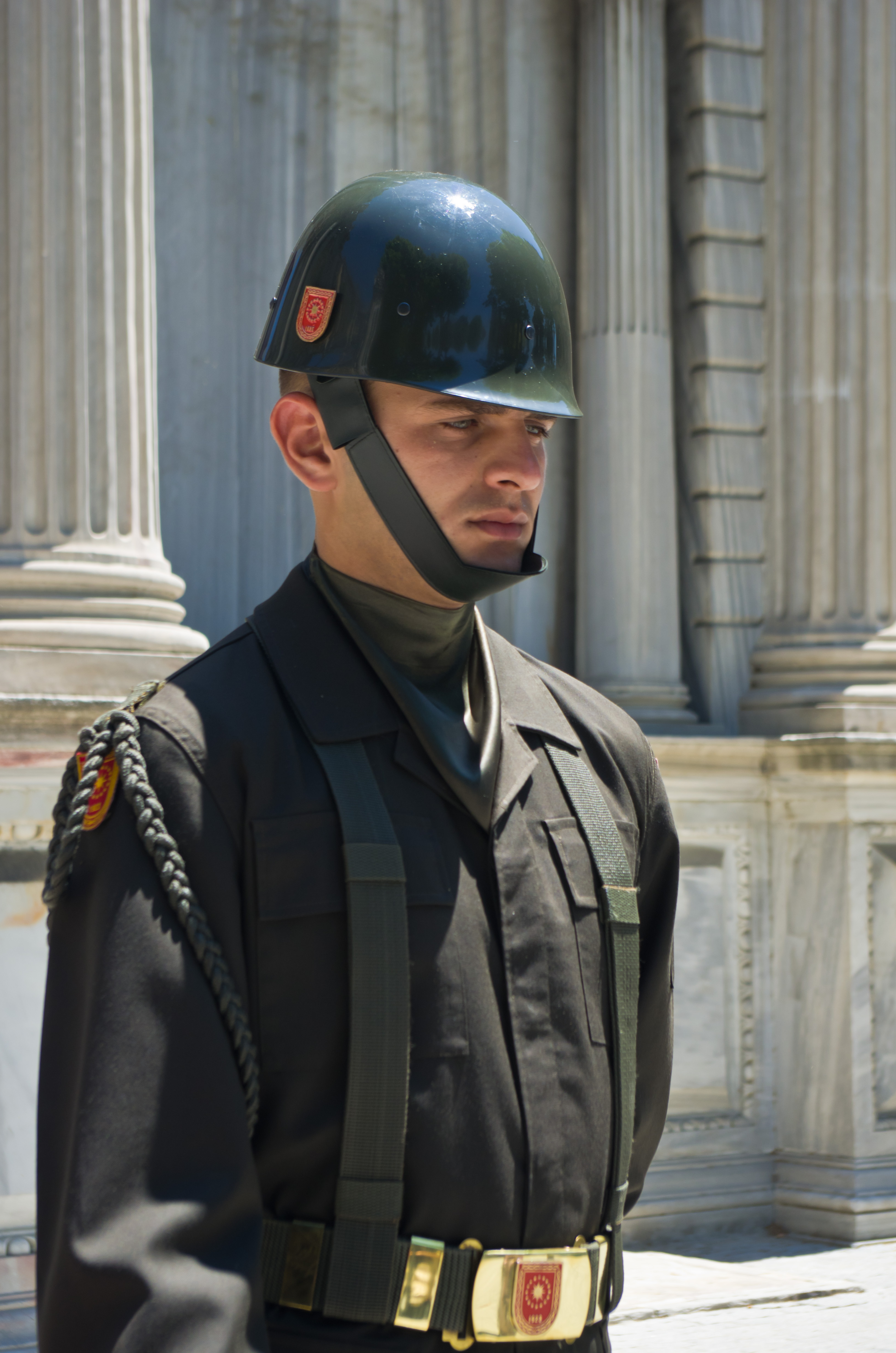
Sentry from the Turkish Presidential Guard, wearing a green cravat

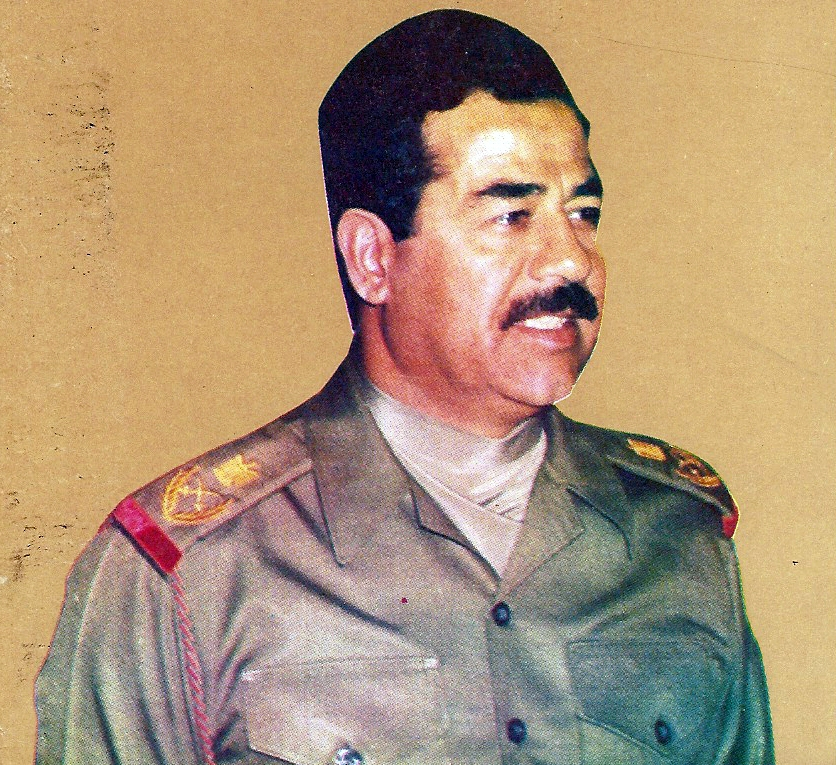
President Saddam Hussein of Iraq wearing an olive green cravat as a part of his Iraqi Army field marshal's uniform

== In media ==
- In Scooby-Doo, an American horror comedy cartoon franchise, the character Fred Jones wears a signature orange ascot, sometimes mistaken for a scarf. The look was part of the mod look for teenage and young adult men from the late-1960s era Scooby-Doo originates from, and Fred's anachronistic retention of the ascot in some modern incarnations of the series becomes a source of comedy.
- The Eighth Doctor, played by Paul McGann wore a midnight blue ascot tie on the Doctor Who special The Night of the Doctor.
- Bruce Wayne wears an ascot in various incarnations of Batman media.

== See also ==
- Cravat
