= Morning dress =

Formal Western dress code for day attire

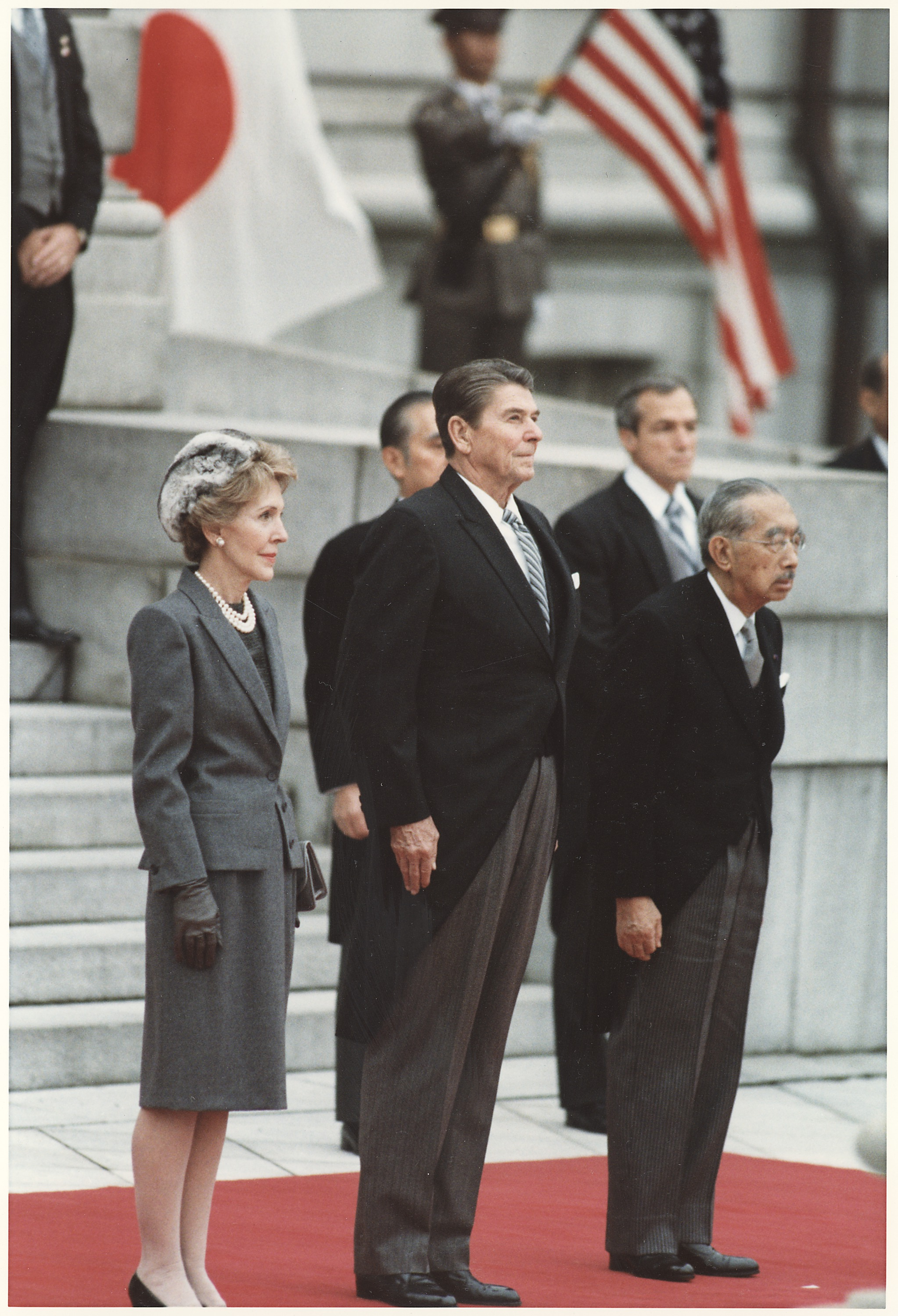
From right to left: Japanese emperor Hirohito, United States president Ronald Reagan and his wife Nancy in 1983, both men in morning coats with formal trousers, known as morning dress

Morning dress, also known as formal day dress, is the formal Western dress code for day attire, consisting chiefly of a morning coat, waistcoat, and formal trousers for men, and an appropriate gown for women. The correct hat would be a formal top hat, or if on less spacious audience settings, optionally a collapsible equivalent opera hat.

Men may also wear a popular variant, where all parts (morning coat or waistcoat, and trousers) are the same colour and material, often grey, and usually called "morning suit" or "morning grey" to distinguish it; considered properly appropriate only to festive functions, such as summer weddings and horse races, which consequently makes it slightly less formal.

Debrett's states that morning dress should not be specified as the dress code for events starting after 18:00 (6:00 p.m.). If a formal event will commence at or after 18:00, white tie should be specified instead. The semi-formal daytime counterpart of this code is the black lounge suit.

Morning dress is generally restricted to certain weddings, royal, government, or municipal audiences, and social season events, e.g. horse races. It may also be seen sometimes worn at church services, as well as fraternal orders, and gentlemen's clubs.

== History ==
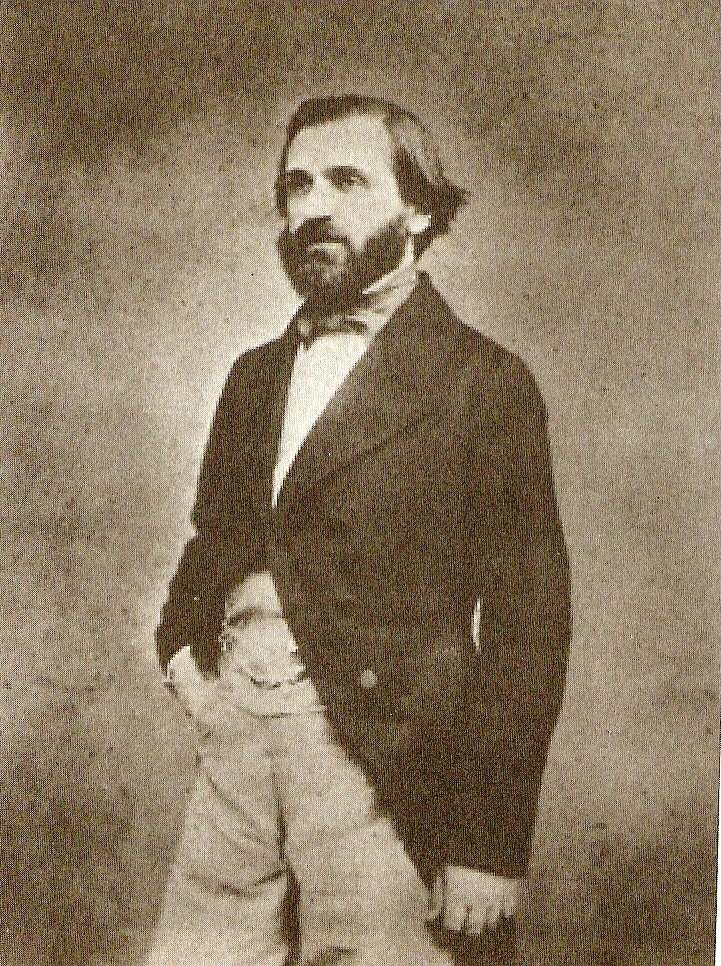
Giuseppe Verdi (1813–1901) in 1844, wearing a double-breasted cutaway

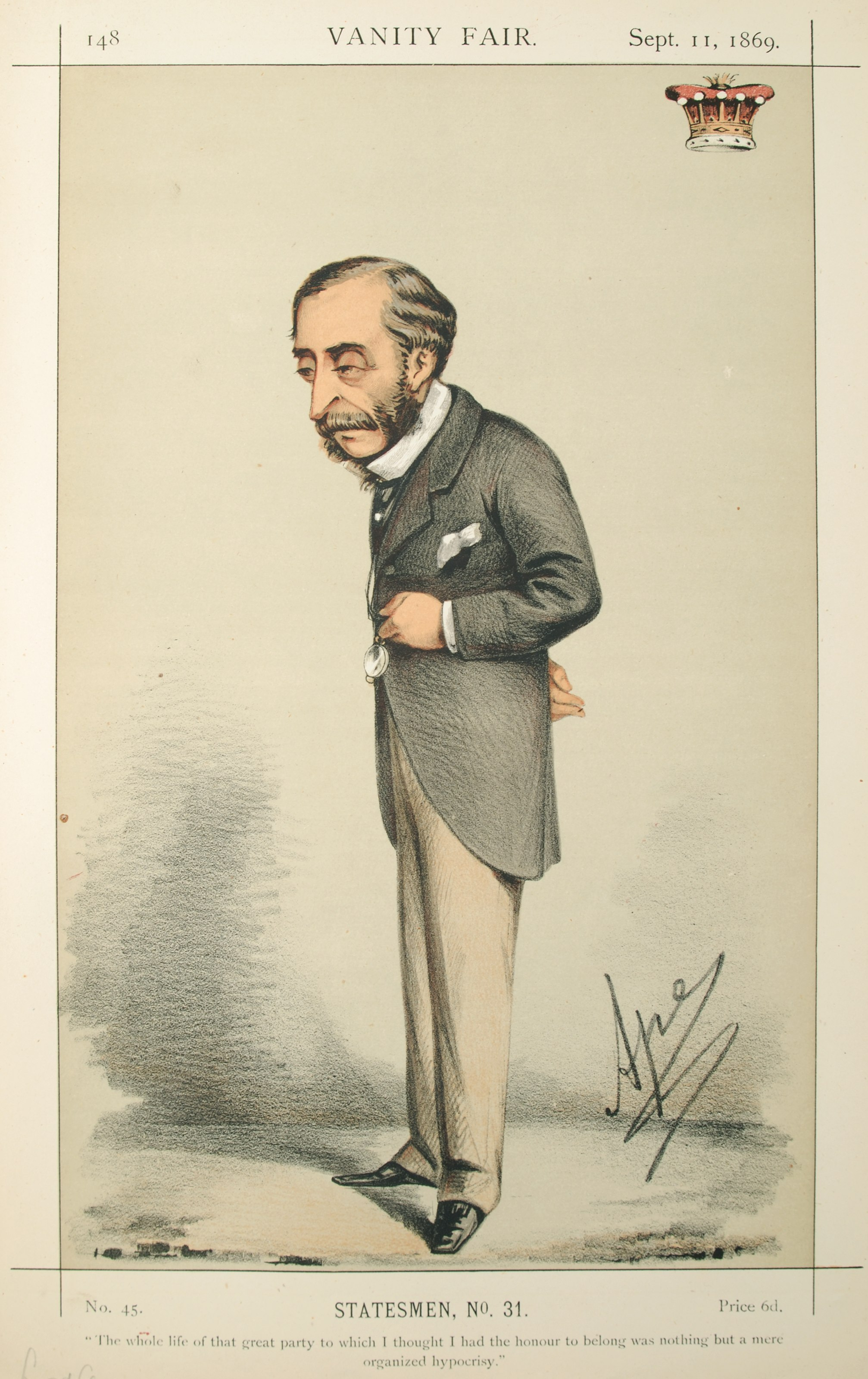
Caricature of Henry Herbert, 4th Earl of Carnarvon in Vanity Fair, 11 September 1869

Morning dress fashion (middle), as opposed to frock coats (left and right) (1848)

The name originated from the practice of gentlemen in the 19th century riding a horse in the morning with a cutaway front, single-breasted morning coat. The modern 20th-century morning dress was originally a more casual form of half dress, but as the 19th century progressed, it gradually became acceptable to wear it in more formal situations instead of a frock coat. In the Edwardian era, it took over in popularity from the frock coat as the standard daytime form of men's full dress. When it was regarded as a more casual coat, it was common to see it made with step collars (notched lapels in American English), but as it took over from the frock coat in formality, it began to be made with the more formal pointed lapels (peaked lapels in American English).

== Composition ==
Morning dress consists of:

- a morning coat (the morning cut of tailcoat), now always single breasted with link closure (as on some dinner jackets) or one button (or very rarely two) and with peaked lapels, may include silk piping on the edges of the coat and lapels (and cuffs on older models with turnup coat sleeves).
- a waistcoat, which matches the material of the coat.
- a pair of formal striped or checked trousers worn with braces.
- a shirt:
  - either a turndown collar is worn (white detachable, fastened by collar studs; or attached) with a tie, in which case the shirt has double cuffs.
  - otherwise, a high detachable wing collar is worn with a double-cuffed shirt; this combination is sometimes accompanied now by a formal ascot, as opposed to a day cravat which is different. This is a more formal option most commonly seen at weddings;
- a plain or patterned silk handkerchief or pocket square may be worn; it is folded and inserted into the front breast pocket of the morning coat.
- black Oxford shoes or dress boots, or boots with a horse riding connection, such as George or Chelsea boot, or galosh-top dress boots; worn with plain dark socks (or another colour if they cannot be seen).

The following can optionally be worn or carried with morning dress:

- a top hat, either classic silk plush, or a modern Melusine fur (replacement for silk plush, as it is no longer in mainstream manufacture). Alternatively, a top hat made of fur felt or wool felt is another common option.
- gloves of suede, chamois, or kid leather; the most traditional colour is lemon or grey
- grey or white spats
- a cane or umbrella
- a pocket watch on the waistcoat rather than at the lapel, or wrist watch
- a boutonnière

=== Morning suit ===
If the trouser cloth matches the coat, the ensemble becomes a morning suit. The waistcoat may also match, or not (an "odd waistcoat"). These are considered slightly less formal than morning coat ensembles, especially in lighter tones. Sometimes referred to as "morning grey dress", which has mid-grey matching morning coat, waistcoat, and trousers (all cut the same as above); being more relaxed, this is a traditional option for events in less formal settings such as Royal Ascot, and is now often worn to weddings as well.

=== Morning coat ===
The modern morning coat is single-breasted and usually has peaked lapels. It is usually closed with a single button but may have a link-front closure instead. It is traditionally in either black or Oxford grey herringbone wool, which should not be too heavy a weight, with curved front edges sloping back into tails of knee length.

The coat may feature ribbon braiding around the edges of the collar, lapels, and down around the tails; it may also be present on the hook vent, breast pocket, and sleeves. Nicholas Storey advises that braiding should be avoided for very formal morning wear.

=== Waistcoat ===
A black morning coat with matching black waistcoat is the most formal option, being worn for court, funerals, memorial services, civic dress and diplomatic dress (replacing or supplementing court dress), with academic dress, or in government use in America.

At social or festive occasions, such as horse races and weddings, a contrasting waistcoat is usually worn. The most traditional colours are dove grey, light grey (including pearl grey), buff or camel (both yellowish tan colours), duck-egg blue, and occasionally white. There has been a tendency towards 'fancy' waistcoats of multicoloured and embroidered materials such as brocade, especially at weddings, although brightly coloured waistcoats may be considered garish. Other colours sold by traditional English tailors include pastels such as powder blue, pale pink, pale green, and other pastels. Generally, traditional waistcoats are made from linen, silk, or wool.

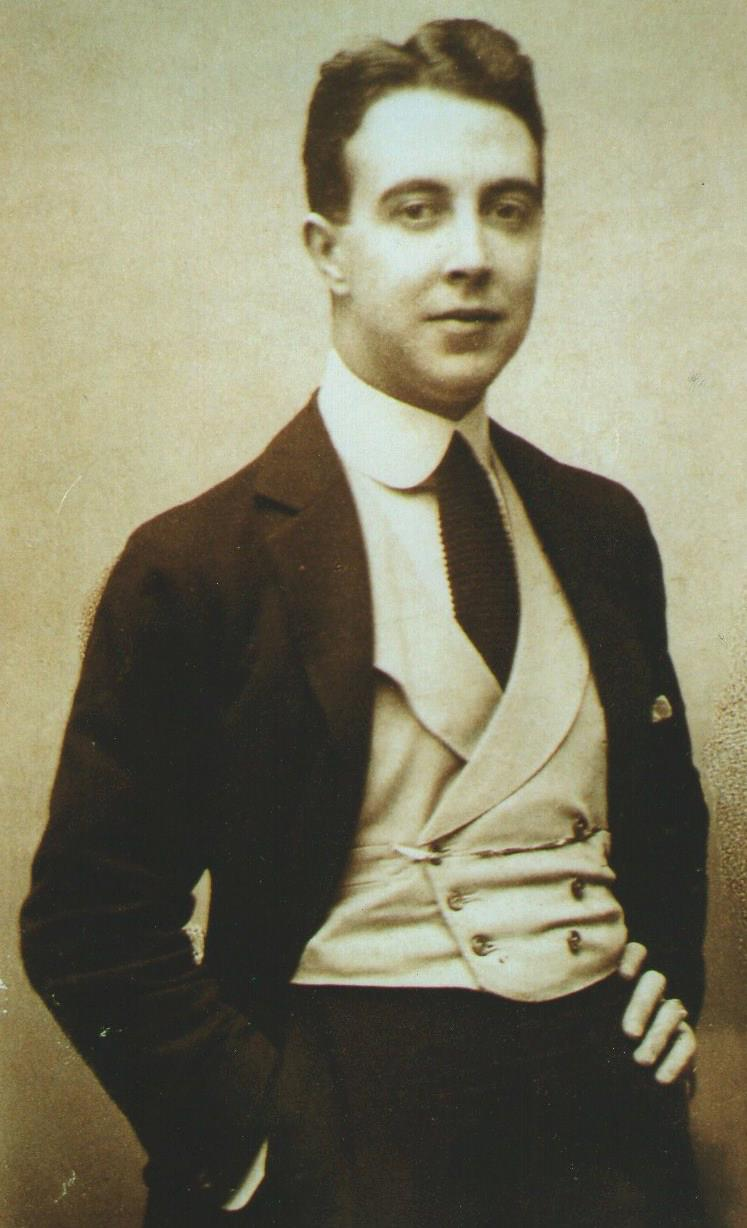
Spanish man-about-town Victor Peñasco in morning suit, with waistcoat with shawl collar, 1912

Waistcoats may be either single-breasted, with or without lapels, or double-breasted with lapels. Single-breasted models with lapels usually feature a step collar and are worn with the bottom button undone, whilst double-breasted models commonly have either a shawl collar or a peak lapel and are worn fully buttoned. In either case, Debrett's advise against wearing backless waistcoats because they do not look as smart as real ones. Sometimes a white slip is worn, which is a strip of fabric buttoned to the inside top of the waistcoat to simulate the effect of a paler under-waistcoat, though the actual wearing of two waistcoats was obsolete even for the late Victorians.

=== Trousers ===
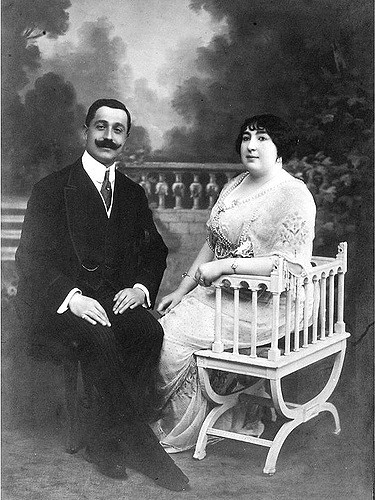
Hamide Ayşe Sultan (1887–1960) with her husband in morning coat and formal trousers

The formal ('spongebag') trousers worn with it are either 'cashmere' striped, or black and white checked. Formal trousers should not have turn-ups (cuffs in American English), and have either flat-fronts or one to two forward pleats to each leg. Braces (suspenders in American English) may be worn to prevent the waistband from appearing beneath the waistcoat if required. Belts should not be worn with morning dress. Less common (and less formal) alternatives to striped trousers are houndstooth check, Prince of Wales check, and grey flannel trousers, amongst others.

=== Shirt ===
Since the Second World War, in the United Kingdom and Commonwealth Realms, the traditional shirt for morning dress has been a white or light-coloured shirt with double cuffs (fastened with cufflinks) and a plain white stiff turn-down collar (often of the cutaway variety) worn with a long tie. A detachable collar is no longer considered to be necessary and is very formal by modern standards.

Alternatively, a wing collar may be worn; the combination of long tie and wing collar is very dated, so these are instead paired with an ascot. Unfortunately, this combination has acquired negative connotations because most dress hire companies have used pre-tied or incorrect patterns for many years, which has caused the configuration to be seen as an inferior or hired look. Consequently, Debrett's (and the late Hardy Amies) consider the wing collar and ascot to be inappropriate for weddings or morning dress, reserving wing collars for white tie.

If a wing collar is worn, the collar should be of the starched, detachable, variety and also include starched single cuffs (secured with cufflinks) all in white. This is because, in the past, a starched stiff-fronted shirt was worn with starched cuffs and a starched detachable wing collar, worn with cufflinks and shirt studs; it is essentially the same as a plain-fronted (rather than Marcella) full evening dress shirt. Contemporary shirts often do not have a detachable collar at all which, provided they have the same height and stiffness as the detachable type, are considered to be an acceptable alternative.

The most formal colour for a shirt is white. Alternatively, a coloured or striped shirt with a contrasting white ("Winchester") collar and (optionally) white cuffs may be worn. Traditional formal shirtings are usually light-coloured and may include cream, blue (such as Wedgwood blue), pink, lavender, peach, salmon, yellow, or pastel green. Morning dress shirts (other than the collar) are usually solid in colour or have thin vertical stripes but may have a slightly bolder pattern such as a houndstooth or glencheck.

=== Neck wear ===
Previously, a grey or (if at a funeral) a black necktie was obligatory. Now all colours are worn; in many clubs and societies the club tie is acceptable to distinguish members from guests at formal lunches and breakfasts. The original silver Macclesfield design (a small check) is still used particularly with cravats, and is often called a wedding tie. Wearing a silver-grey silk tie is the usual practice at royal and other formal events. Although there is no longer a strict rule governing the colour and pattern of ties that are worn to weddings these days, garish options are inadvisable. The English etiquette authority, Debrett's, dictate that smart woven silk ties are preferred to cravats although stocks and cravats may be worn as an alternative. The American etiquette authority, The Emily Post Institute, states that either a tie or a dress ascot may be worn with a morning coat. If a tie is worn, Debrett's advise men to tie it with either a four-in-hand or half-Windsor rather than a Windsor knot.

If worn, cravats may be tied in either a formal dress knot (Ascot knot) which is secured with a cravat pin or a slightly less formal ruched knot which resembles a four-in-hand tie. A wing collar and cravat may be worn with a black coat but not with a grey one. Cravats have been proscribed in the Royal Enclosure at Royal Ascot since 2012 and should therefore be treated with caution in any context in the United Kingdom and other Commonwealth realms.

Bow ties may be worn as an alternative to the necktie. Although there are photographs of the Duke of Windsor and Sir Winston Churchill wearing bow ties with morning dress, and Debrett's does not advise against the wearing of one, it is not expressly provided as an option by Debrett's. Bow ties have been proscribed in the Royal Enclosure at Royal Ascot since 2019 and should therefore be treated with caution in the United Kingdom and other Commonwealth realms. Some style authorities, including Bernhard Roetzel and Nicholas Antongiavanni, advise against the wearing of bow ties with morning dress. Others, such as Nicholas Storey, provide that bow ties may be worn so long as they are obviously not an evening bow tie.

=== Footwear ===
Shoes should be of the traditional, highly polished black plain cap-toe Oxford type without brogueing but may include a single line of tooling across the toe cap. The shoes should not be patent leather, which is now reserved for evening formal wear. Although it may be acceptable to wear 'smart-slip on shoes' and monkstraps, it is not ideal to wear either loafers or open-laced shoes, such as derby shoes (or bluchers in American English). In the Victorian and Edwardian era button boots and Oxford boots were worn and these can be correctly worn with morning dress today. When worn at equestrian events, boots of equestrian origin such as jodhpur boots, George boots and Chelsea boots are also acceptable. Socks should be black or grey. Spats were once frequently seen with morning dress, but are now rarely worn and, by 1939, the practise of wearing them was considered to be almost extinct.

=== Accessories ===
==== Headgear ====
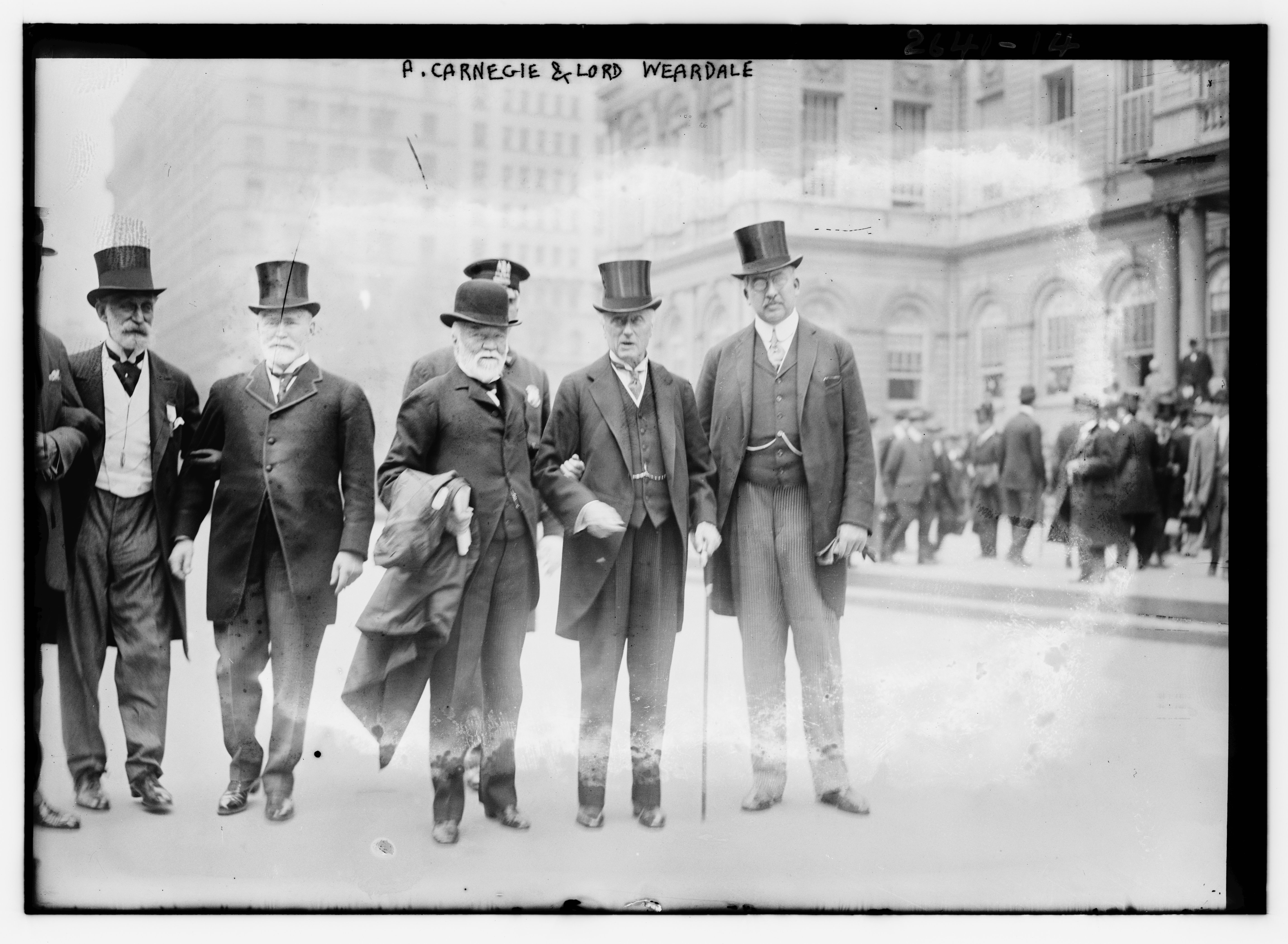
A. Carnegie and Lord Weardale. While the top hat would be considered the standard, alternatives occur; here a bowler hat.

In the Commonwealth of Nations, traditional black, or grey (less formal, but becoming more widely accepted), top hats are considered an optional accessory for weddings. However, hats remain compulsory in the Royal Enclosure at Royal Ascot.

==== Pocket square ====
A pocket square should always be worn with morning dress. They may be made from linen, cotton, or silk. Whilst a simple white linen square with rolled edges is classic, they may instead be a solid colour or patterned and should always complement the neckwear. However, although it is very common practice in wedding parties, many style authorities do not recommend wearing a matching (i.e., identical) pocket square and tie, as it tends to look contrived, draws attention away from the wearer's face, and displays sartorial uncertainty. Pocket squares with a solid colour should generally be paired with a patterned tie (and vice versa) and should not share the same base colour. In other words, the solid color item should be in a color that is not the dominant color of the other.

It may be puffed or folded into a square, single-point, or multi-pointed style folds. Puffed pocket squares work well with softer materials such as silk; other folds tend to hold their shape better when more structured materials such as linen are used.

==== Decorations ====
The wearing of decorations, orders, and medals is uncommon with morning dress. An invitation will generally indicate whether or not they should be worn and, in the United Kingdom and Commonwealth realms, are more common for religious services or public functions of official significance. Up to four stars, one neck badge, and full-size medals should be worn with morning dress (mirroring the practices observed on day military uniforms); when a neck badge and star are worn together, they must be of different orders.

== Etiquette: "morning dress" ==
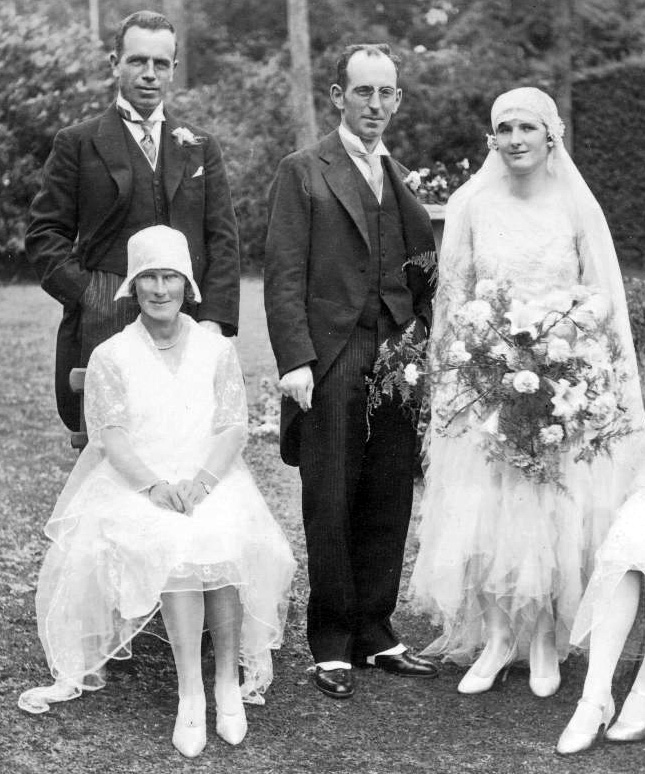
Men in morning dress for a wedding (1929)

Men wear morning dress when members of a wedding party. In common with court dress, mess dress, and white tie, morning dress is for prestigious and important social occasions. Despite its name, morning dress may be worn to afternoon social events before five o'clock, but not to events beginning after six o'clock in the evening; the term "morning" is best understood as "daylight".

In Europe, the groom sets the sartorial tone: the guests may wear morning dress if he does.

=== Equivalents for men ===
Following the etiquette of formal wear, morning dress being its civilian day wear, there are several equivalents.

White tie is the correct, equivalent formal dress for evening social events. The cutaway front of the morning tail coat differs from the evening tail coat (dress coat) in that the waist of the former is cut obliquely while the waist of the latter is cut horizontally, and the tail is cut differently from the swallow tailcoat used for evening dress. The skirt waist construction of the coats is equestrian in origin, to ease the wearer's riding his horse.

=== Equivalents for women ===
Women should wear 'smart daywear', such as a smart day dress or a skirt worn with a jacket. The straps of tops and dresses should be at least one inch wide even if worn with a jacket or other covering. Strapless, off-the-shoulder, one shoulder, halter neck, sheer, bardot, and spaghetti straps are not permitted in the Royal Enclosure at the Royal Ascot and may be inadvisable at other occasions that require morning dress. Dresses and skirts should be neither too short nor too revealing. At their shortest, they should fall just above the knee.

Trouser suits and smart jumpsuits are permissible at the Royal Ascot but must be ankle length. With trouser suits, the coat and trousers should match in both material and colour. Jumpsuits must also comply with the regulations that apply to skirts and dresses.

At the most formal of occasions and the races, dresses and skirts should be worn with a tailored jacket. A bolero, shrug, or pashmina may otherwise be worn. Daytime shoes, such as wedges, should be worn rather than very high heels or evening-style shoes and ought to be comfortable enough to wear for several hours. Tights should always be worn.

Hats should be worn in the Royal Enclosure at the Royal Ascot but are optional at weddings. They should be a style that is securely fitted and may be worn throughout the day. Hats should neither be so large or cumbersome that they hamper kissing nor too small. The Royal Ascot does not permit fascinators within the Royal Enclosure. Headpieces may be worn instead of a hat but must have a solid base of at least 10 cm.

Daytime jewellery, such as pearls, add an extra flourish of style.

A shoulder bag is often preferable to a clutch purse, especially for mothers at weddings.

== Contemporary use ==
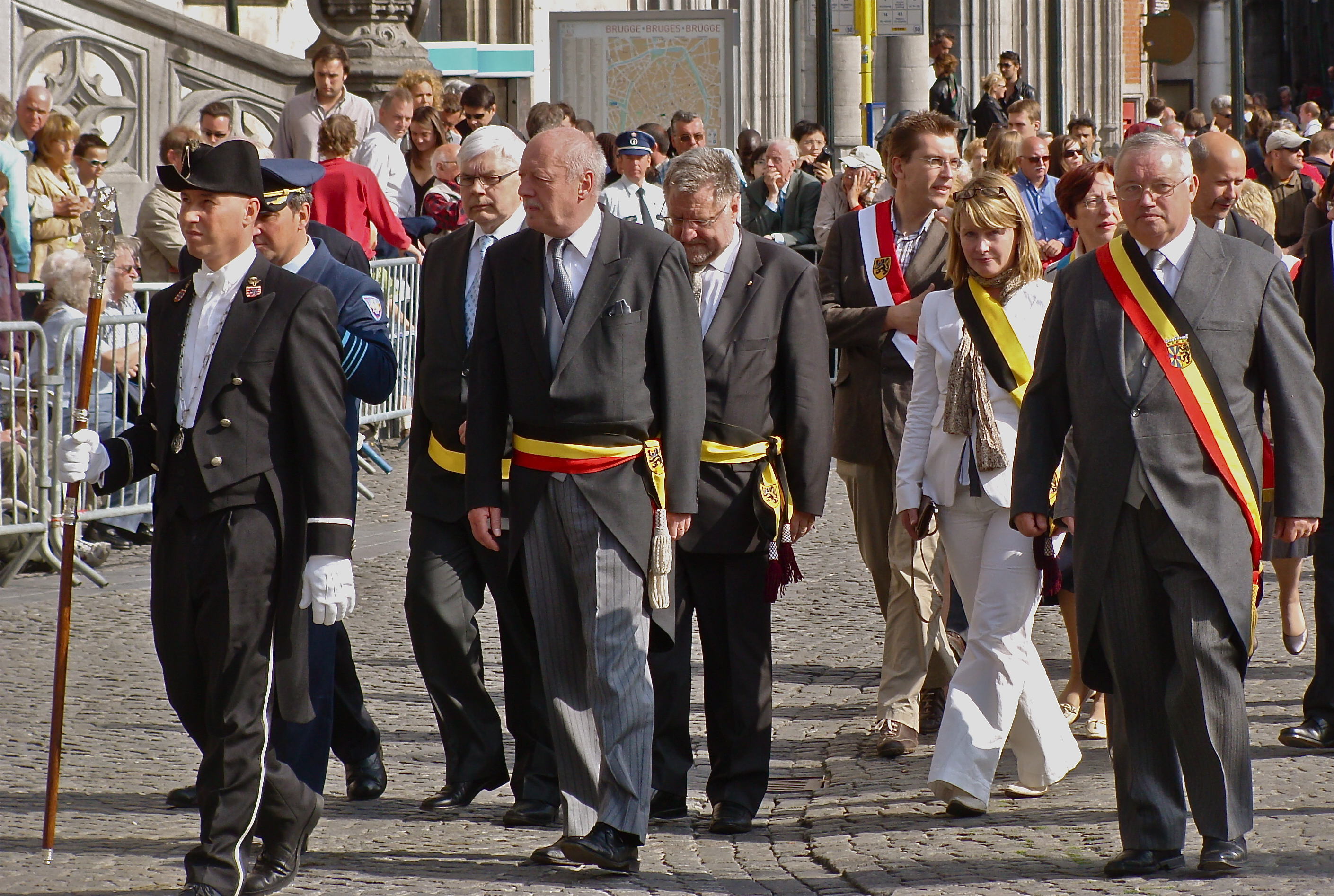
Morning dress worn at a Catholic Procession of the Holy Blood in Bruges, Belgium (2009)

=== Commonwealth of Nations ===
Morning dress remains somewhat common at weddings in the United Kingdom and other Commonwealth of Nations countries (such as Australia, and New Zealand), usually worn only by male members of a wedding party but sometimes by guests as well. Men at upper and upper-middle class weddings usually wear their own morning coats and their own ties. On these occasions they may wear their old private school ties. For the British working class (constituting the majority of the population), a wedding party tends to wear hired morning suits that are co-ordinated, the men usually dressed in outfits of identical ties, handkerchiefs and waistcoats.

Additionally, morning dress may be seen at some royal or governmental audiences and social season events (e.g. horse races such as the Royal Enclosure of Royal Ascot, the Queen's Stand of Epsom Derby, or the Victoria Derby in Australia). It may also be seen sometimes worn at church services in St Paul's Cathedral, London, and St Giles' Cathedral, Edinburgh. Other occasions include certain City of London institutions including fraternal orders, gentlemen's clubs, livery companies and guilds. It also exists as school uniforms at some of United Kingdom's most traditional schools, such as Harrow (on Sundays) and Eton.

=== United States ===
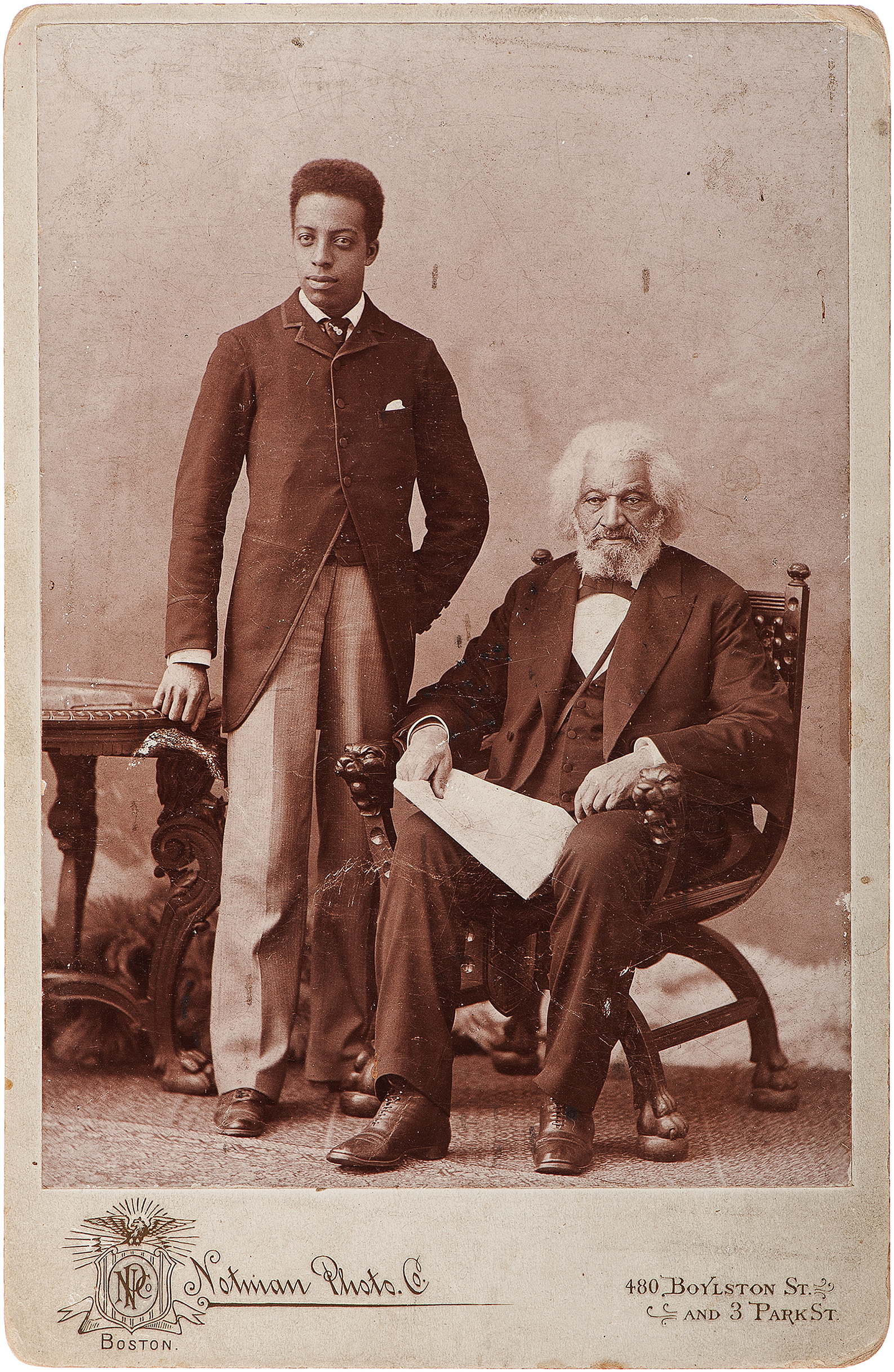
Joseph Douglass in morning dress with grandfather Frederick Douglass in frock coat (c. 1890s)

In the U.S., the morning coat is sometimes referred to as a cutaway coat.

In the U.S., morning dress is rare. Harvard Commencement is one of the few occasions in the United States where morning dress is consistently worn (see Academic regalia of Harvard University). It was formerly worn in traditional weddings and political formal events, the Kennedy inauguration of 1961 being the last use for that ceremony. In Virginia, morning dress is worn by a governor-elect when sworn to office.

By tradition, the Solicitor General of the United States (SG) wears striped pants and a morning coat when delivering an oral argument before the Supreme Court of the United States. The deputy U.S. solicitors general also wear morning dress when attending the Supreme Court, as do other Justice Department attorneys. This contrasts with the attire of other attorneys, who usually wear ordinary business suits when arguing before the U.S. Supreme Court. It is rare for the SG to argue before state courts and lower federal courts, but when this occurs the SG does not wear morning dress. The morning-dress Supreme Court tradition applies only to male SGs; for female SGs and deputies, use of the morning coat is optional. Elena Kagan, upon her appointment as SG in 2009, decided to wear a dark pantsuit instead for her arguments. Elizabeth Prelogar followed Kagan's precedent upon becoming SG in 2021.

Morning dress has recurred in the traditional Easter parade associated with Fifth Avenue in New York City.

== See also ==
- The stroller is a similar, but slightly less formal, dress code, hence not interchangeable with full morning dress. Whereas morning dress is the daylight equivalent of evening's white tie, the stroller is the daylight equivalent of black tie and is essentially a more-formal lounge suit (indeed, in Britain it was historically referred to as a "black lounge suit").

== Bibliography ==
- Apparel Arts magazine, an account of 1930s fashion and style; some issues more relevant than others, such as those reproduced with comment at The London Lounge.
- Amies, Hardy (2013). The Englishman's Suit. London: Quartet Books Ltd. ISBN 978-0-7043-7169-9.
- Antongiavanni, Nicholas (2006). The Suit: A Machiavellian Approach to Men's Style. HarperCollins. ISBN 978-0-06-089186-2.
- Bryant, Jo; Wyse, Liz, eds. (2012). Debrett's Men's Style. Richmond, Surrey: Debrett's Limited. ISBN 978-1-870520-00-3.
- Donald, Elsie, ed. (1981). Debrett's Etiquette and Modern Manners. London: Debrett's Peerage Limited. ISBN 0-905649-43-5.
- Flusser, Alan (2002). Dressing the Man: Mastering the Art of Permanent Fashion. HarperCollins. ISBN 978-0-06-019144-3.
- Hume, Lucy (2017). Debrett's Wedding Handbook. Debrett's Limited. ISBN 978-0-9929348-4-2.
- Keers, Paul (1987). A Gentleman's Wardrobe: Classic Clothes and the Modern Man. London: Weidenfeld & Nicolson. ISBN 0-297-79191-5.
- Mansfield, Alan; Cunnington, Phillis (1973). Handbook of English Costume in the 20th Century 1900-1950. London: Faber and Faber Limited. ISBN 0-571-09507-0.
- Post, Anna; Post, Lizzie (2014). Emily Post's Wedding Etiquette (6 ed.). New York: The Emily Post Institute, Inc. ISBN 978-0-06-232610-2.
- Post, Peggy; Post, Anna; Post, Lizzie; Post Senning, Daniel (2011). Emily Post's Etiquette. New York: The Emily Post Institute, Inc. ISBN 978-0-06-174023-7.
- Pullman, Nigel. "Dress codes" (PDF). Livery Companies of the City of London.
- Roetzel, Bernhard (2009). Gentleman: A Timeless Guide to Fashion. Cambridge: Tandem Verlag GmbH. ISBN 978-3-8331-5270-2.
- Schneider, Sven (2017). Morning Dress Guide (1 ed.). Saint Paul, Minnesota: Gentleman's Gazette LLC.
- Storey, Nicholas (2008). History of Men's Fashion: What the Well-Dressed Man is Wearing. Barnsley: Pen & Sword Books Ltd. ISBN 978-1-84468-037-5.
- Tuckerman, Nancy; Dunnan, Nancy (1995). The Amy Vanderbilt Complete Book of Etiquette: 50th Anniversary Edition (1 ed.). New York: Bantam Doubleday Dell Publishing Group Inc. ISBN 978-0-385413428.
- Wyse, Elizabeth (2015). Debrett's Handbook. Debrett's Limited. ISBN 978-0-9929348-1-1.
