= Day wear =

Day wear, day attire, or day dress may refer to:

- Day dress or morning dress, a dress code in Western dress codes
- Black lounge suit, a men's day attire semi-formal intermediate of a formal morning dress and an informal lounge suit

== See also ==
- Full dress uniform, a permitted supplementary alternative equivalent to the civilian morning dress for day wear
- Casual wear
