= Formal trousers =

Trousers for formal day attire

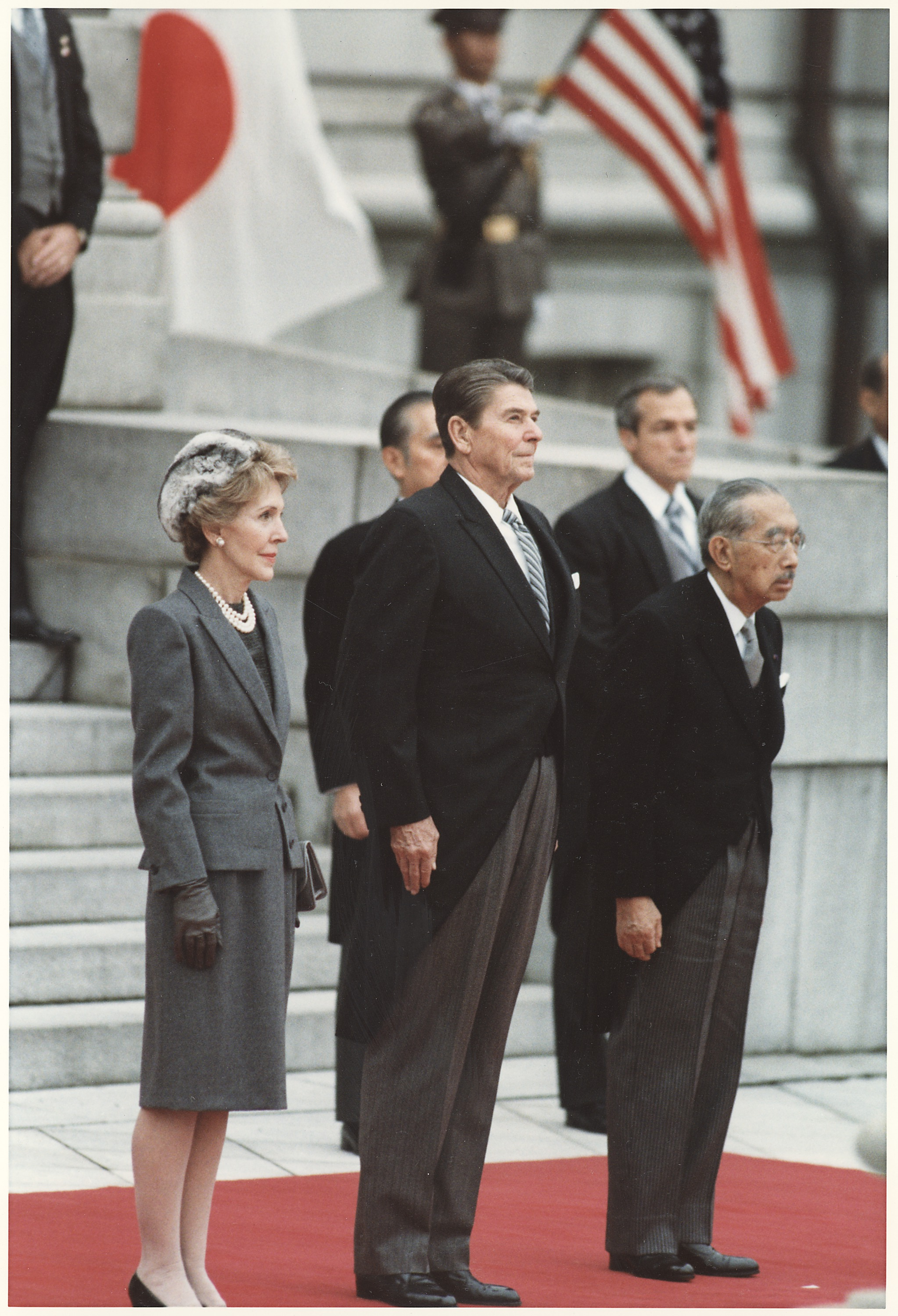
Nancy, and US president Ronald Reagan together with Emperor Hirohito of Japan, both men in morning coats with formal trousers (known as morning dress) (1983).

Formal trousers, also known as morning trousers, formal striped trousers or cashmere-stripe trousers, or colloquially spongebag trousers, are grey striped or patterned formal trousers for day attire in traditional Western dress code, primarily associated with formal morning dress or, secondly, its half dress equivalent, black lounge suit. Traditionally made from heavy wool ranging from worsted, melton to partial twill weave, the pattern is most often of a muted design in stripes of black, silver, white and charcoal grey in various combinations (not to be confused with pinstripe or chalkstripe, which are formed of single thin lines spaced equally apart). In addition, formal trousers may also come in check patterns, such as houndstooth check, or plaids, although these variants are widely considered as not the most formal.

Typically, formal trousers are intended to be worn with braces with a fishtail back covered by a waistcoat, and have pleats for correct ironing result and comfort. Likewise, for traditional reasons of formality, they do not have turn-ups, since these are considered less formal.

== Name ==
The British synonym "cashmere striped trousers" refers to the actual name of the stripe pattern, and not to the fabric. Similarly, the slang term "spongebag trousers" or "spongebags" is due to the perceived similarity of the distinctive stripe pattern to traditional sponge-bags, a bag of toiletries (but does not apply to check patterns). In Germany, the synonym "Stresemann trousers" occurs, for the same reasons that the less formal stroller or black lounge suit is called a "Stresemann".

== History ==
These trousers were introduced in the first half of the 19th century as a complement to the, then widely worn, frock coat. As established formal day attire trousers, they were subsequently worn to go with morning dress, which, along with its less formal equivalent black lounge, in turn, gradually replaced the frock coat as a standard of formal day attire by the 20th century.

== Gallery ==
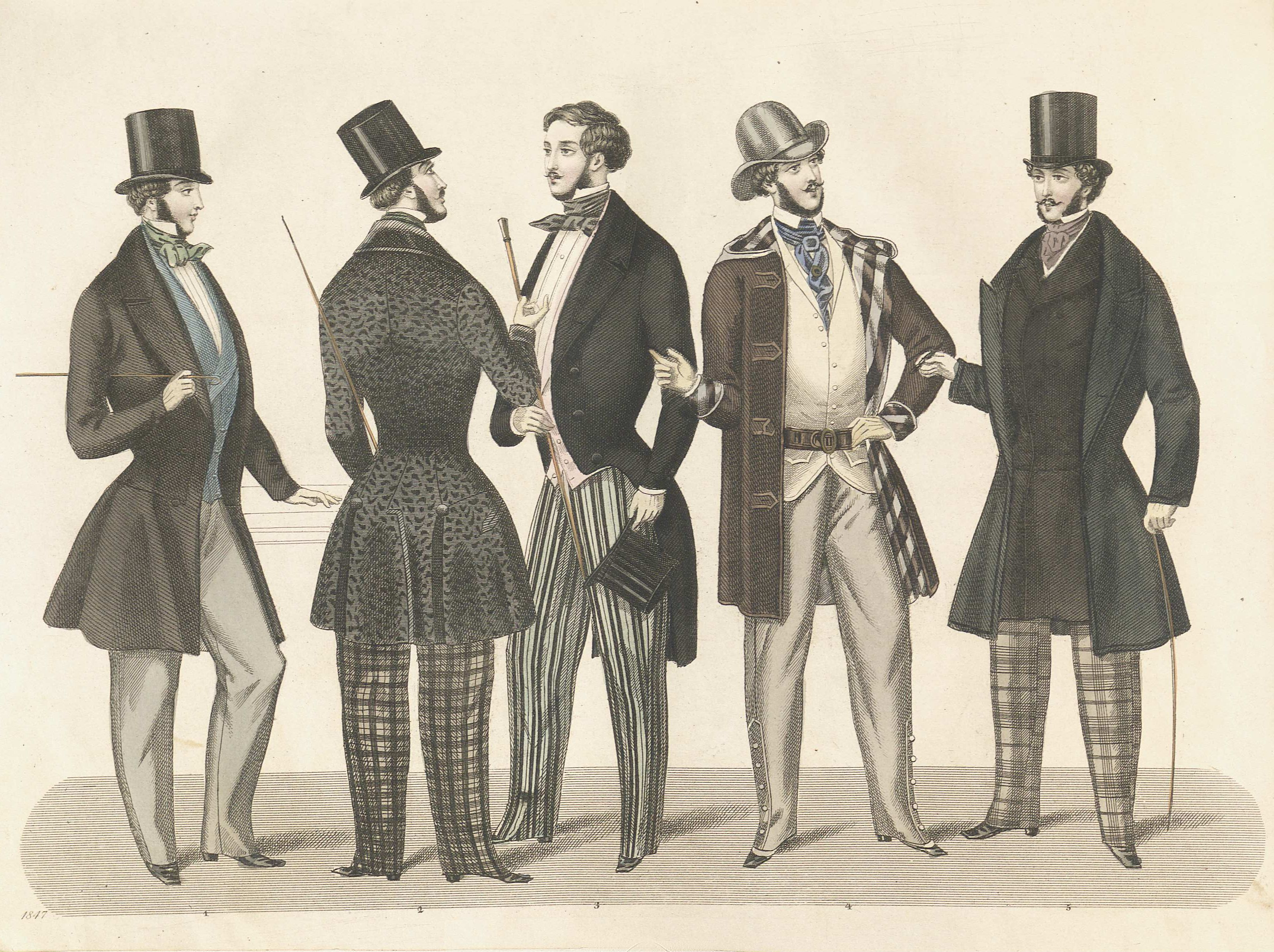
Different innovative, early interpretations of formal trousers with frock coats and top hats, in Stockholms mode-journal (1847).

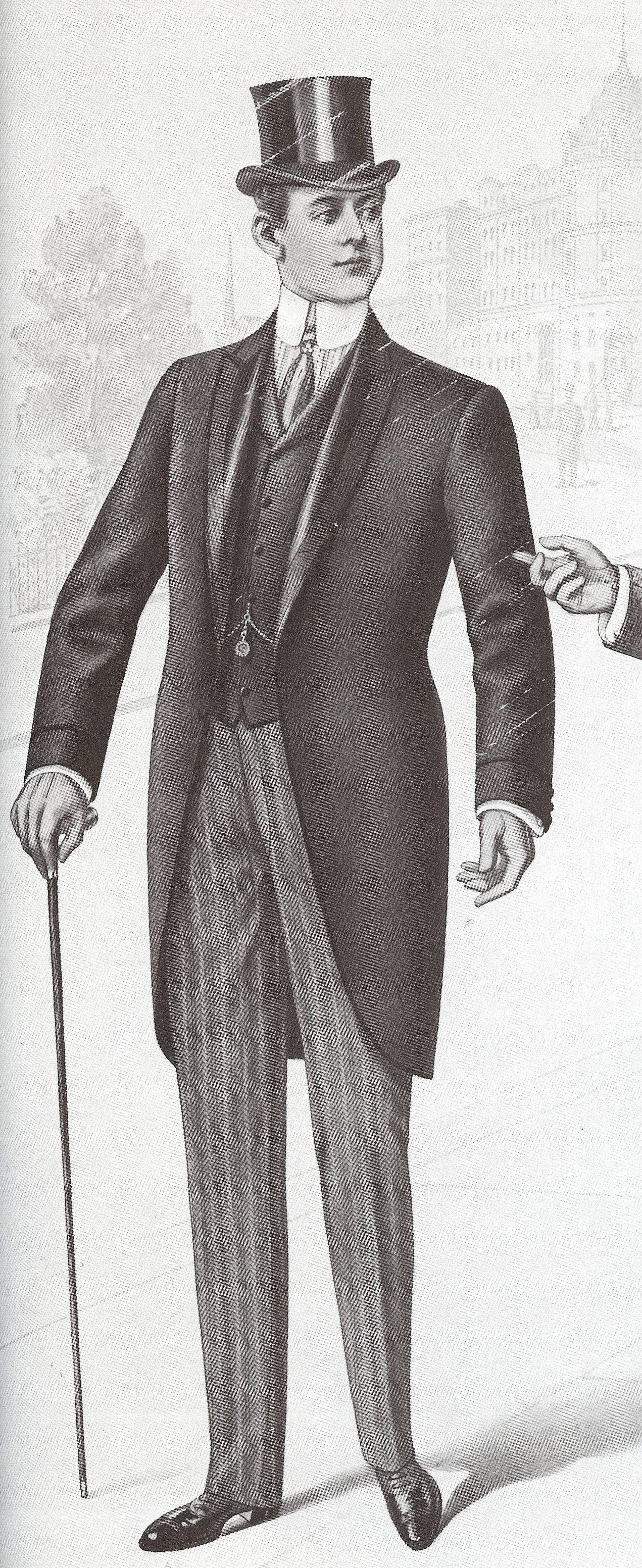
Edwardian era-styled morning coat with formal striped trousers (Fashion, 1901).

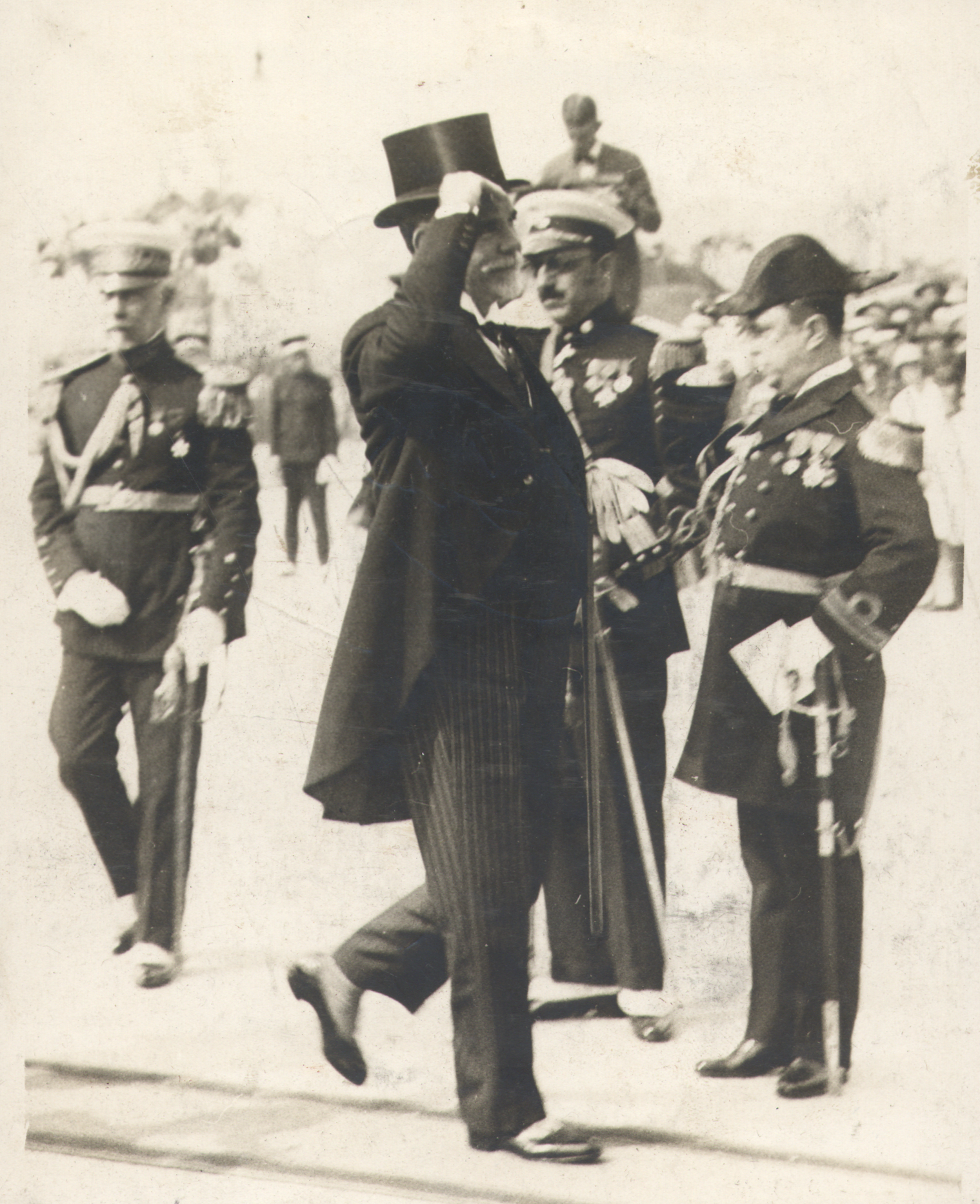
Brazilian president Washington Luís during a military ceremony (late 1920s−early 1930s).

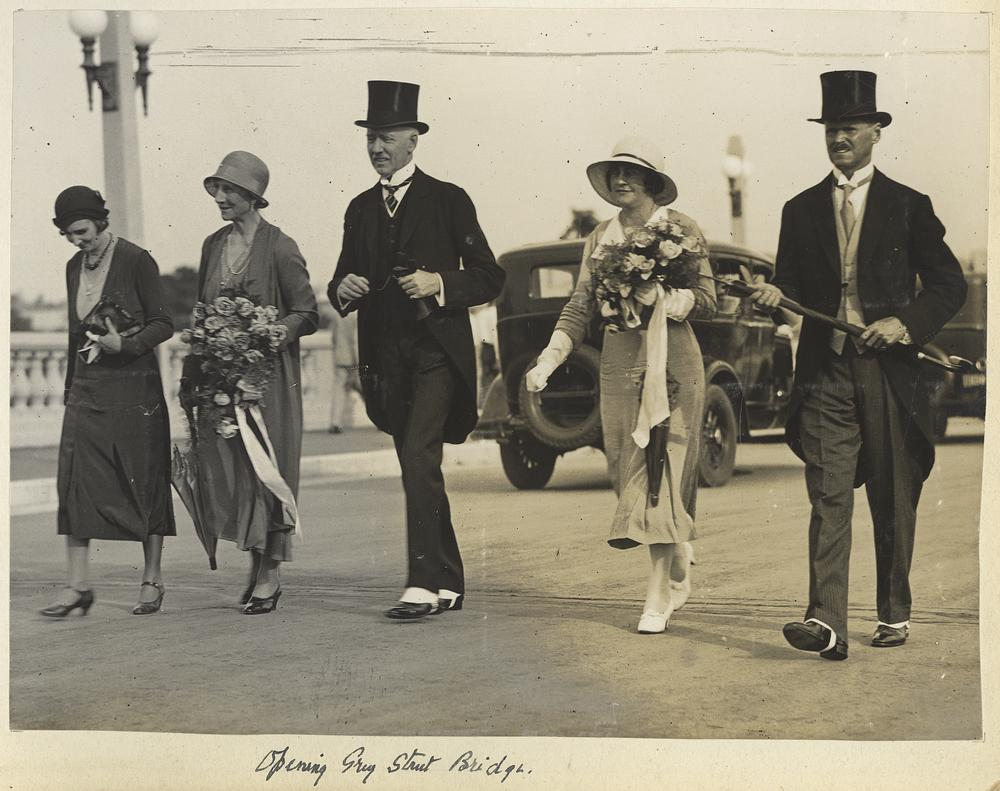
Sir John Goodwin and Lady Goodwin together with Neil Campbell and his wife, walking over the Grey Street Bridge in morning dress, top hats and spats (1931).

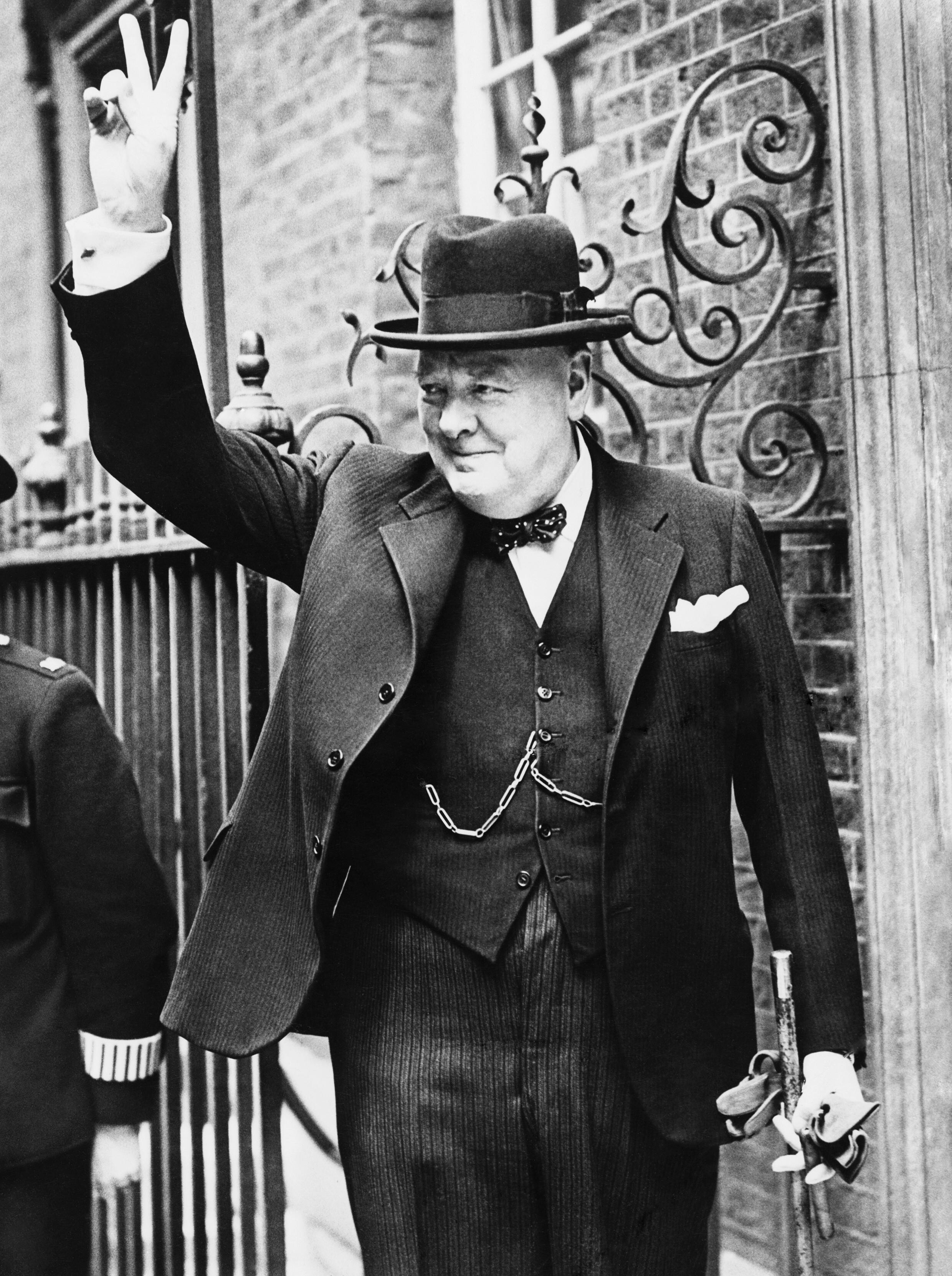
UK prime minister Winston Churchill in a black lounge suit with homburg hat and walking stick on Downing Street, giving his famous 'V' sign during World War II.

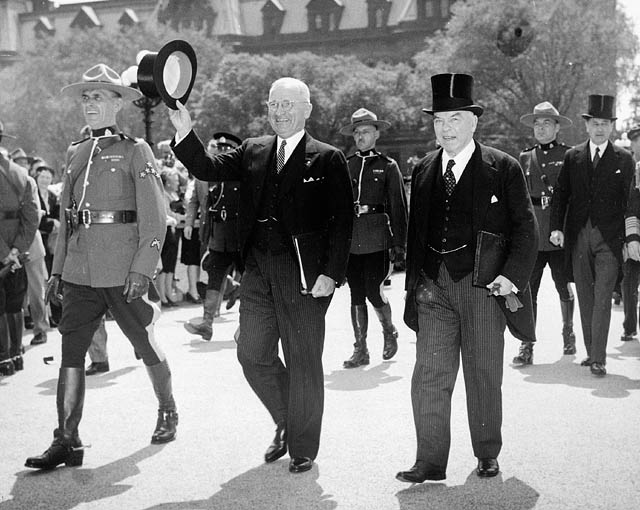
US president Harry Truman with Canadian prime minister William Lyon Mackenzie King (1947).

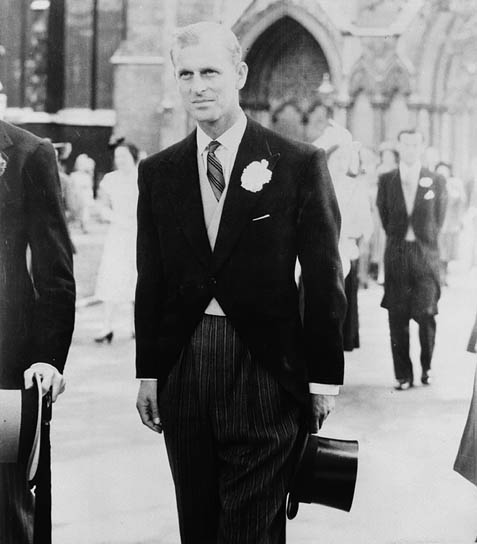
Duke of Edinburgh, husband of The Princess Elizabeth, Duchess of Edinburgh (1951)

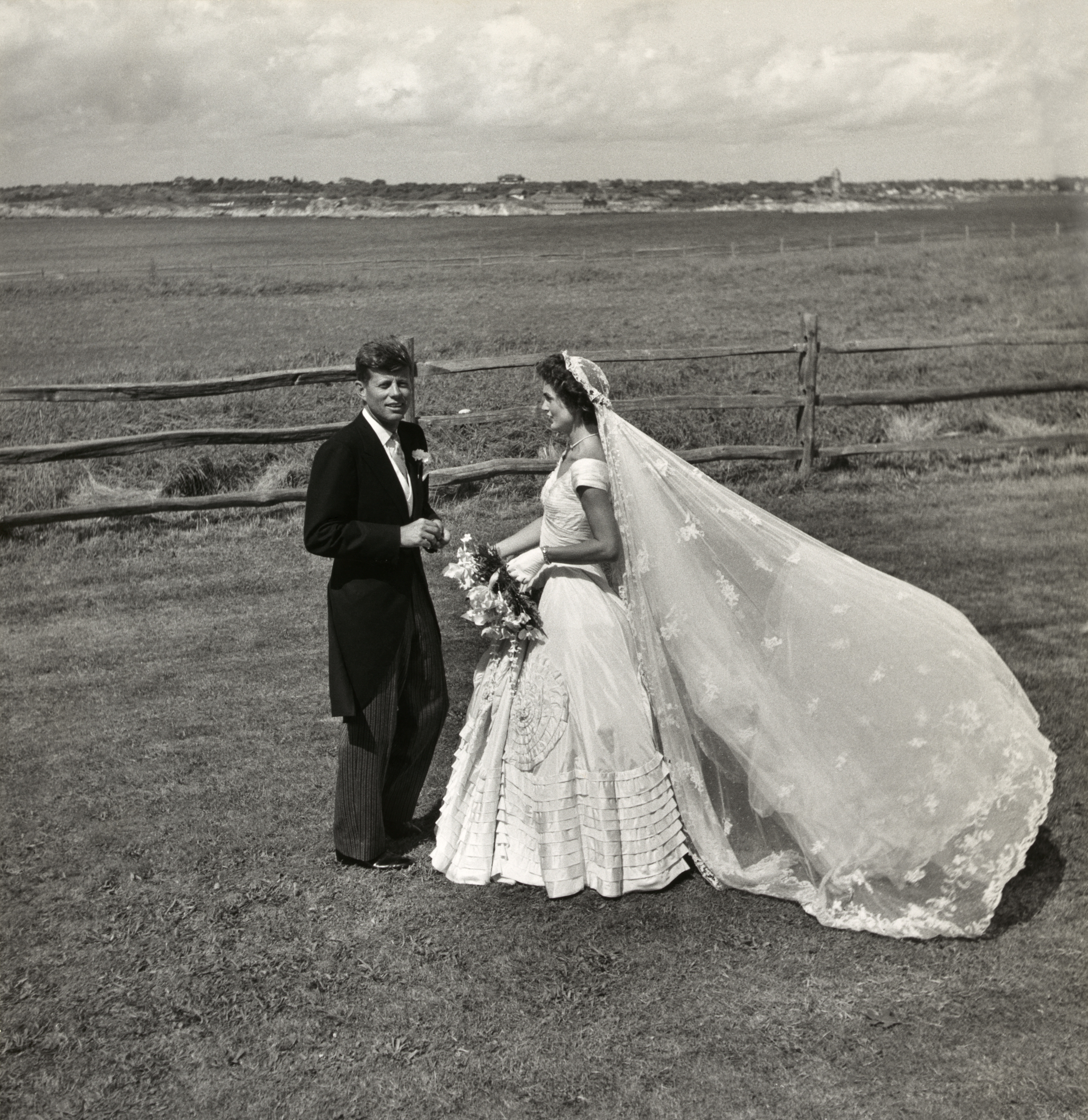
John F. Kennedy and Jacqueline Bouvier Kennedy, in wedding attire, outdoors (1953)

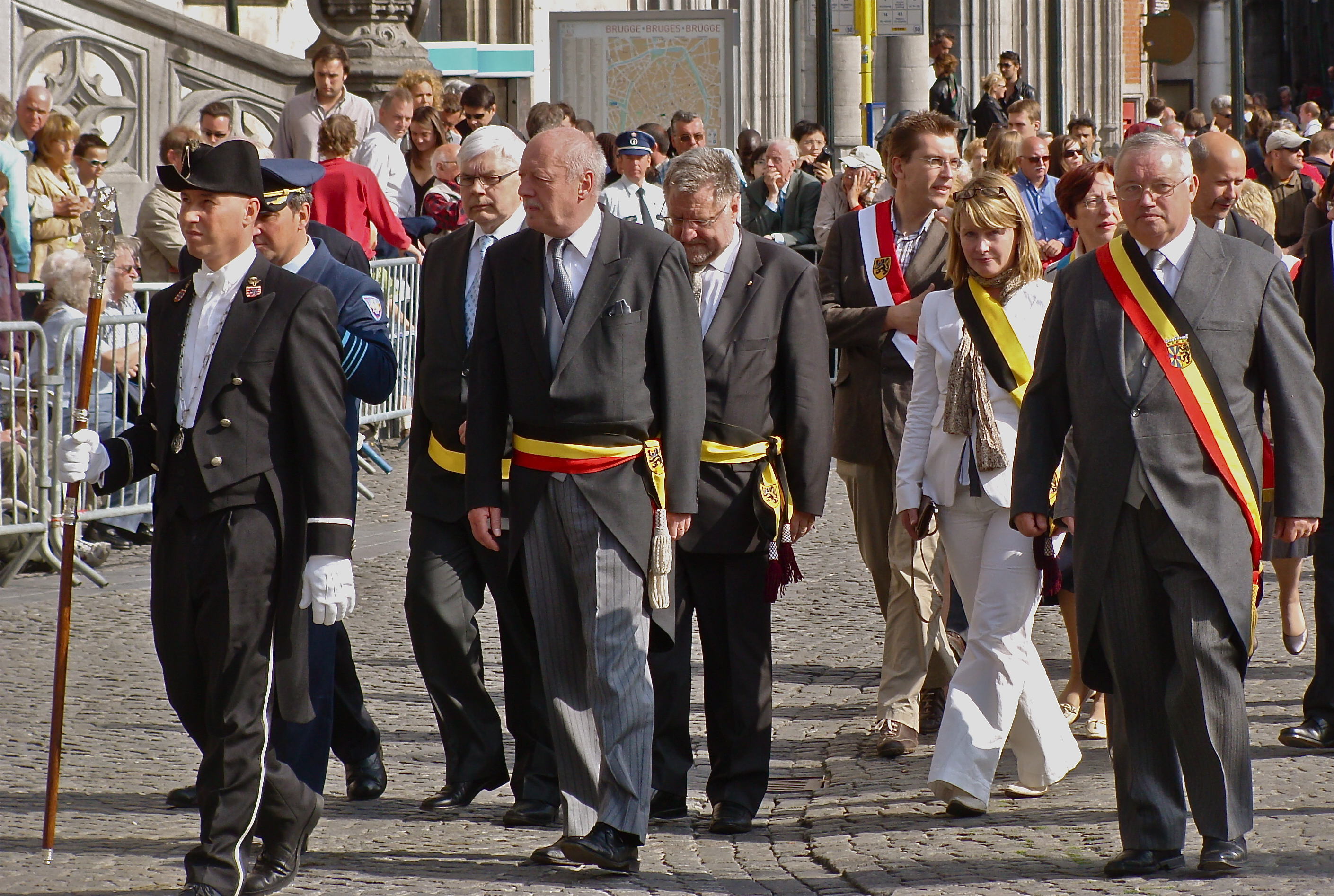
Patrick Moenaert, Mayor of Bruges (left), and Paul Breyne, Governor of West Flanders (right), both in morning dress along with formal trousers at the Sanguis procession in Bruges, Belgium.

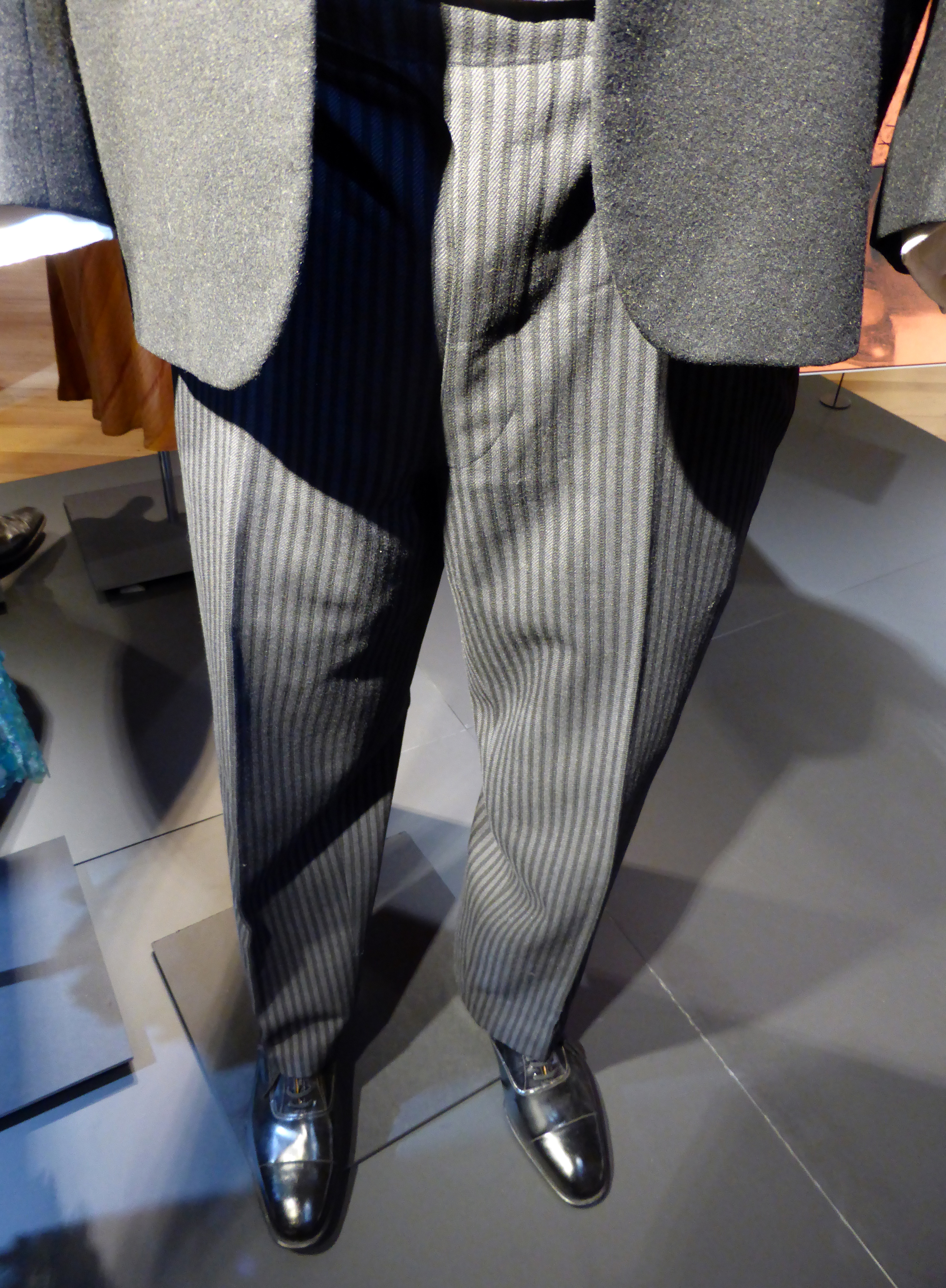
Formal trousers to a black lounge suit in an exhibition of the Textilfabrik Cromford, Ratingen, Germany.

== See also ==
- Trews
