= Full dress uniform =

Uniform for wear on formal occasions

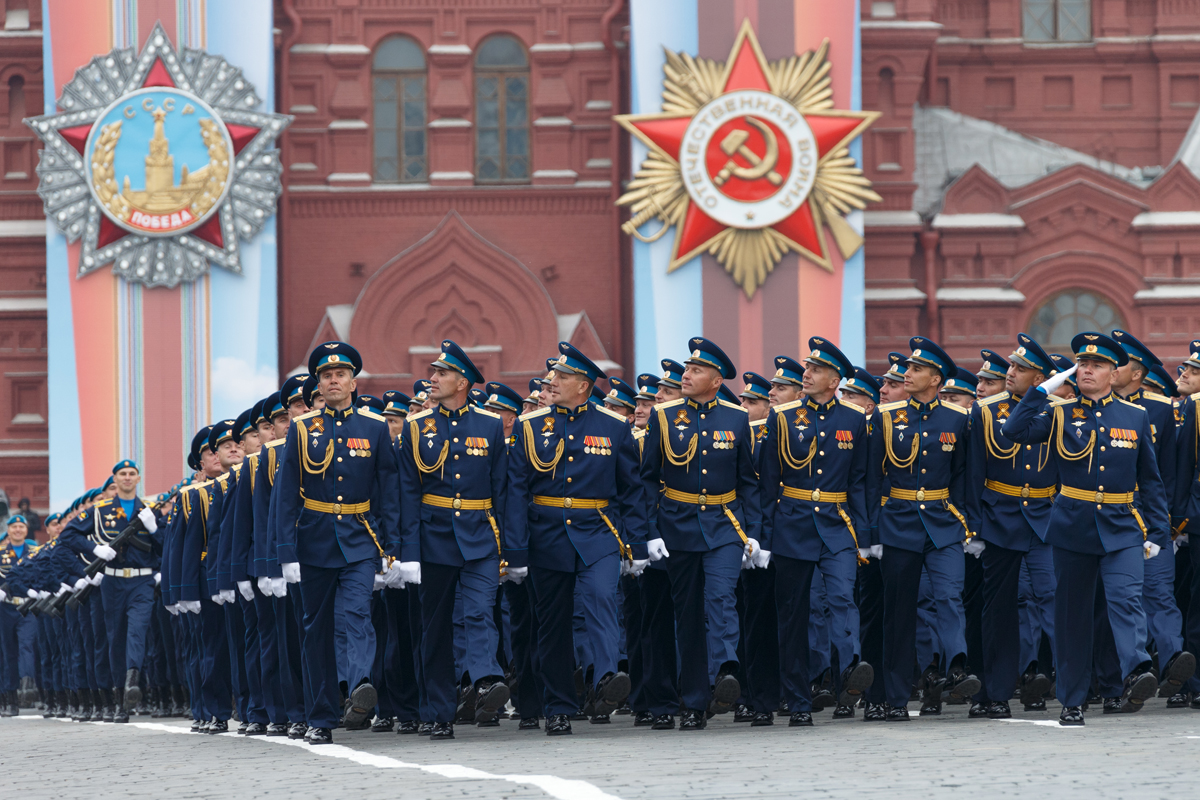
Officers of the Russian Aerospace Forces at the 2019 Moscow Victory Day Parade in full dress

Full dress uniform, also known as a ceremonial dress uniform or parade dress uniform, is among the most formal type of uniform used by military, police, fire and other public uniformed services for official parades, ceremonies, and receptions, including private ones such as marriages and funerals. Full dress uniforms typically include full-size orders and medals insignia. Styles tend to originate from 19th-century uniforms, although the 20th century saw the adoption of mess dress-styled full-dress uniforms.

Designs may depend on regiment or service branch (e.g. army, navy, air force, marines). In Western dress codes, full dress uniform is a permitted supplementary alternative equivalent to the civilian white tie for evening wear or morning dress for day wear – sometimes collectively called full dress – although military uniforms are the same for day and evening wear. As such, full dress uniform is the most formal uniform, followed by the mess dress uniform.

Although full dress uniforms are often brightly coloured and ornamented with gold epaulettes, braids, lanyards, lampasses, etc., many originated in the 18th and early 19th centuries as normal styles of military dress that, with the adoption of more practical uniforms, were eventually relegated to ceremonial functions. Before World War I, most armed forces of the world retained uniforms of this type that were usually more colourful and elaborate than the ordinary duty (known as undress), or the active service dress uniform.

While full dress uniform is predominantly worn at occasions by commissioned officers and senior non-commissioned officers, it may also be worn as optional wear at personal expense by enlisted personnel on occasions such as weddings. It is also sometimes worn by members of royal courts, orders of chivalry or certain civilian uniformed services, although some of the latter may resemble court uniforms.

== Name ==
The phrase "full dress uniform" is often applied in order to distinguish from semi-formal mess dress uniforms, as well as informal service dress uniforms.

Yet, a full dress uniform is sometimes simply called a dress uniform. Although many services use the term dress generically for uniforms, allowing it to refer to more modern service dress ("combat") uniforms with suitable modifiers (e.g. the British Army's obsolete Battle Dress; and the U.S. Army's obsolete Battle Dress Uniform). Therefore, the term dress uniform without prefix typically refers to full dress uniform as described in this article.

== History ==
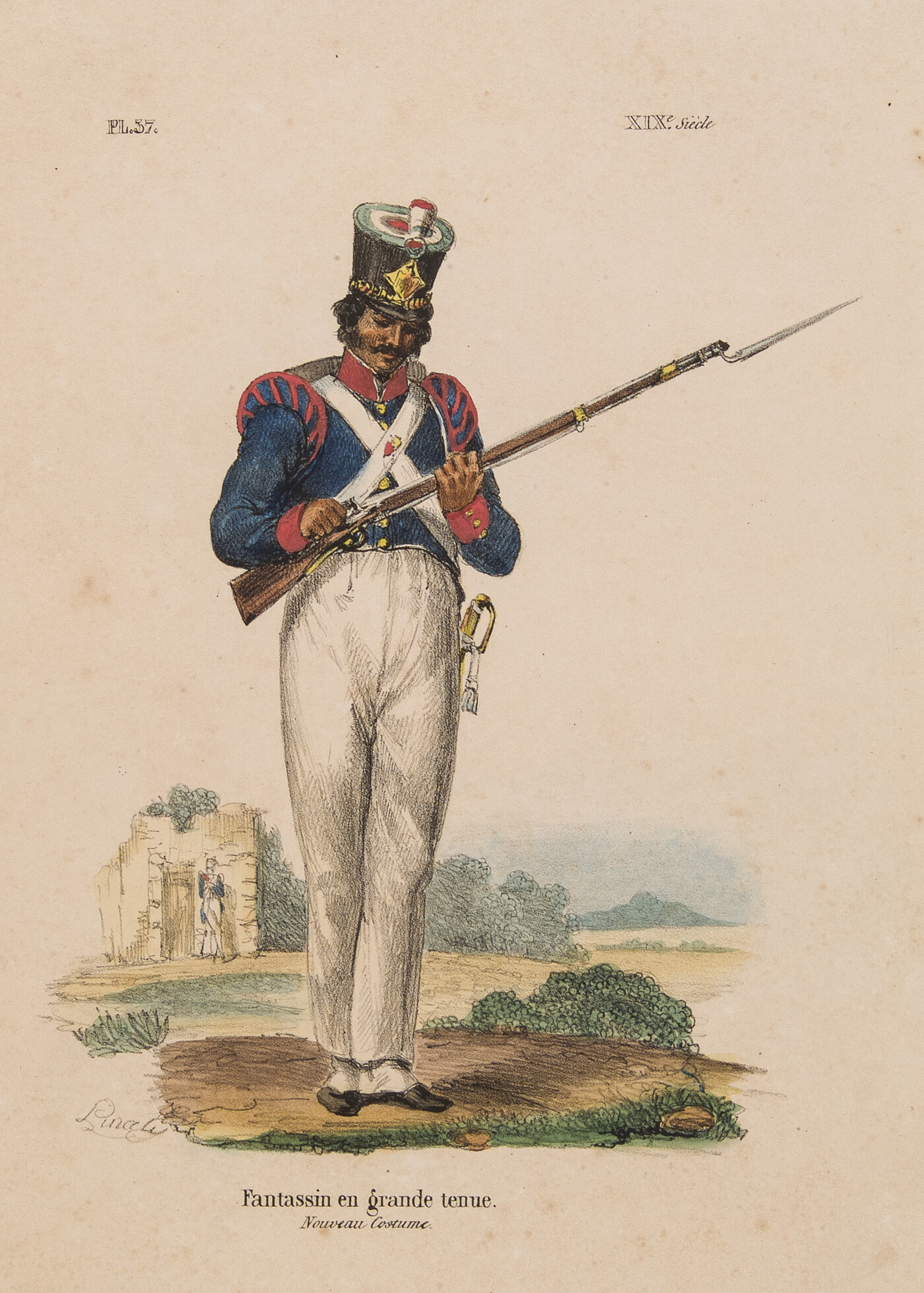
An 1828 illustration of a Mexican soldier in full dress uniform

During the 19th century a division developed in most armies between the uniform worn for parade and ceremony ("full dress"), active service ("field dress") and daily working ("barrack" or "fatigue" dress). For off-duty wear outside barracks, full dress was usually worn in a slightly modified form ("walking out dress"). The British and American armies were dependent upon voluntary recruiting and found that a smart uniform served to attract recruits and improve morale amongst those already serving. The British regimental system fostered numerous distinctions amongst different units.

This was not limited to volunteer armies, with conscript armies of continental Europe retaining many of the colourful features that had evolved during the nineteenth century, for reasons of national and unit pride. Thus, in 1913 most French soldiers wore red trousers and kepis as part of their full dress, the majority of British foot regiments retained the scarlet tunics for parade and off duty ("walking out"), the German Army was characterised by Prussian blue, the Russian by dark green, and the Austro-Hungary Army by a wide range of differing facing colours dating back to the 18th century.

There were usually exceptions to each of these rules, often distinguishing unique units. This included the German cuirassiers, who wore white full dress; British rifle regiments, who wore rifle green; and French mountain troops who wore large berets and light blue trousers. The U.S. Army with its "dress blues" was an exception, with cavalry, artillery and infantry being distinguished only by the different branch colours.

After World War I most full dress uniforms disappeared. Many of the royal or imperial regimes that had taken a particular pride in the retention of colourful traditional uniforms had been overthrown and their republican, fascist, or communist successors had little incentive to retain old glories. Elsewhere cost and disillusion with the "peacock" aspects of old-fashioned soldiering had a similar effect, except for ceremonial guard units and such limited exceptions as officers' evening or off-duty uniforms.

Modern armies are characterised by simple and drably coloured dress even for ceremonial occasion, with the exceptions noted above. However a general trend towards replacing conscript armies with long-serving professionals has had, as a side effect, a reversion to dress uniforms that combine smartness with some traditional features. Thus the U.S. Army announced in 2006 that uniforms of modern cut but in the traditional dark and light blue colours would become universal issue, replacing the previous grey/green service dress. This measure was short lived, being phased out after 2019. The French Army has, with the abolition of conscription, reintroduced kepis, fringed epaulettes and sashes in traditional colours to wear with camouflage "trellis" or light beige parade dress.

The British Army with its strong regimental traditions has retained a wide range of special features and dress items to distinguish individual units, in spite of recent amalgamations. Although there are still official patterns for full dress uniforms for each regiment or corps within the British Army, this uniform is seldom issued at public expense, except for units which are often on public duties, such as the Guards Division, Regimental Bands and Corps of Drums, which are bought from the regiment's allowance. Details of allowances, and allowable tax relief for items which must be purchased are listed in the Army Dress Regulations.

== Full dress uniform by country ==
=== Argentina ===
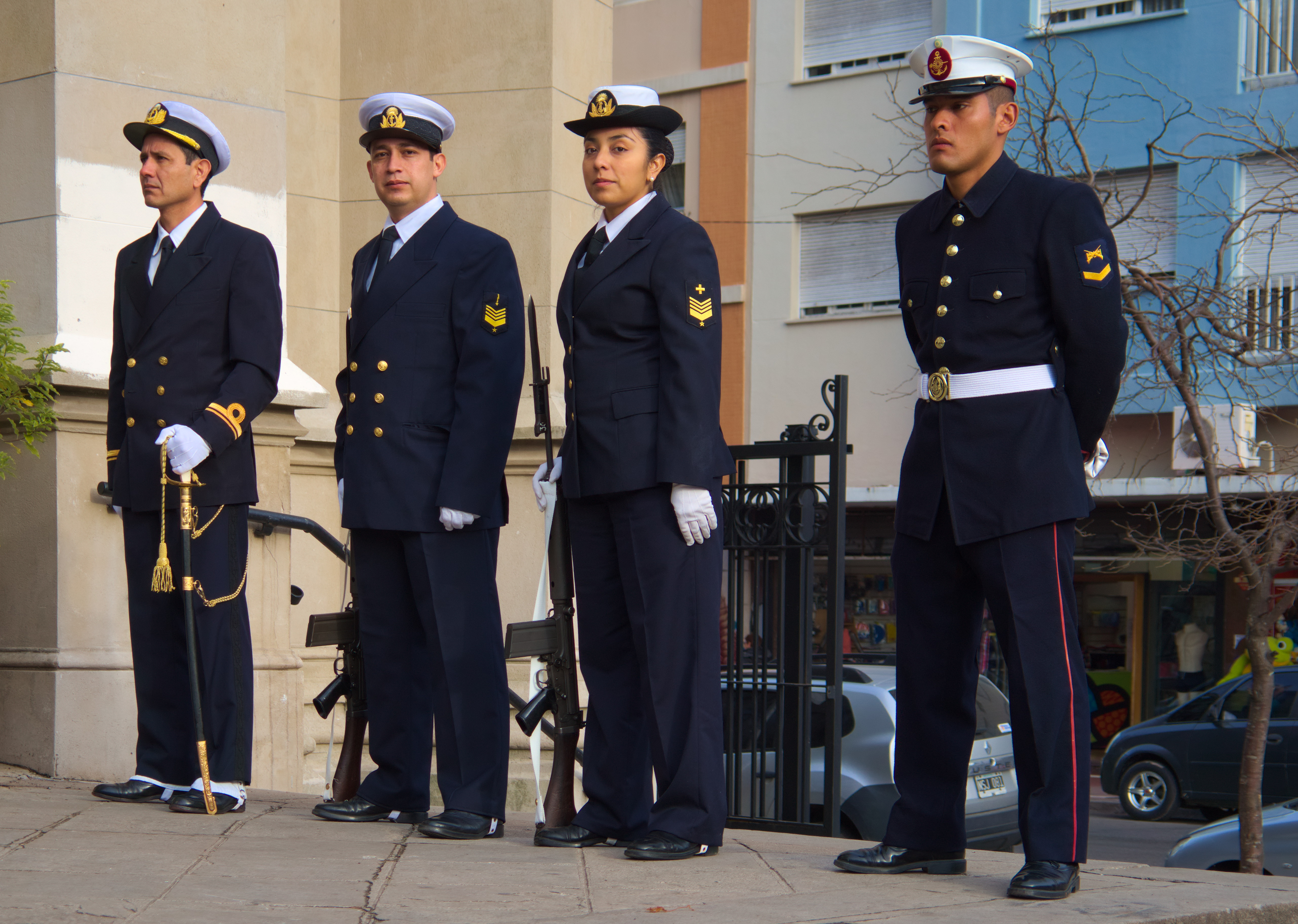
Members of the Argentine Navy in full dress.

In the Armed Forces of the Argentine Republic, the Argentine Federal Police, Argentine National Gendarmerie and Naval Prefecture, dress uniforms are worn during military and civil occasions, especially for the military bands and colour guards. They are a reminder of the military and law enforcement history of Argentina, especially during the early years of nationhood and the wars of independence that the country took part in.

The Argentine Army's modern dress uniform consists of a high-collar dark blue coat with a white peaked cap, epaulettes, sabre (for officers and senior NCOs), trousers of the same colour, a golden belt (silver for NCOs), black shoes, and medals. A white coat, with open collar, white shirt and black tie is used in summer. A simpler version, without sabre and with ribbons instead of medals, is worn for some formal, mostly indoors, occasions, such as dinners. Several regiments within the Argentine Army are authorized ceremonial full dress uniforms which date from the 19th century, including the Regiment of Patricios, the Regiment of Mounted Grenadiers, and the 1st Artillery Regiment in the Buenos Aires Garrison.

The Argentine Navy dress uniform is a navy blue rig with a visor cap for officers and senior ratings and sailor caps for junior ratings, epaulettes and sleeve rank marks (for all ranks), a sword and scabbard for officers, blue trousers for men and skirts for women, a belt, and black leather shoes or boots. Marines wear peaked caps with the dress uniform. Epaulettes are only worn with the dress uniform. The Argentine Air Force uses a uniform similar to one used by the Royal Air Force, in brighter colour.

Regardless of service branch military police personnel wear helmets with their dress uniforms, plus armbands to identify service branch.

=== Australia ===
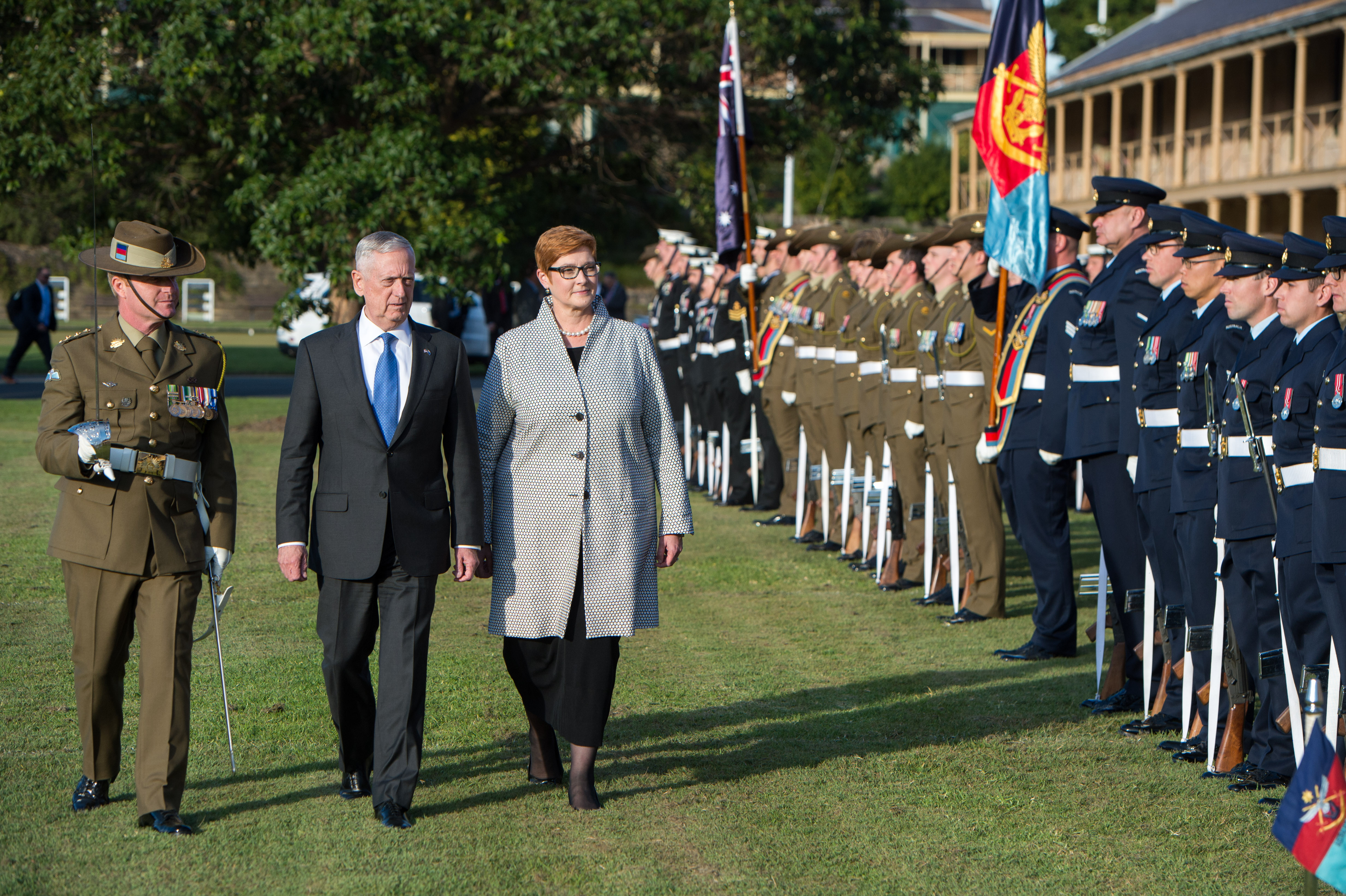
Members of the Australia's Federation Guard in ceremonial dress

The Australian Army has several orders of ceremonial uniforms. The Royal Australian Navy also have a few different ceremonial dress uniforms for its commissioned officers, senior sailors, and junior sailors. Members of the Australian armed forces wear these uniforms for ceremonial occasions, commemorative events and special occasions.

=== Canada ===
==== Canadian Armed Forces ====
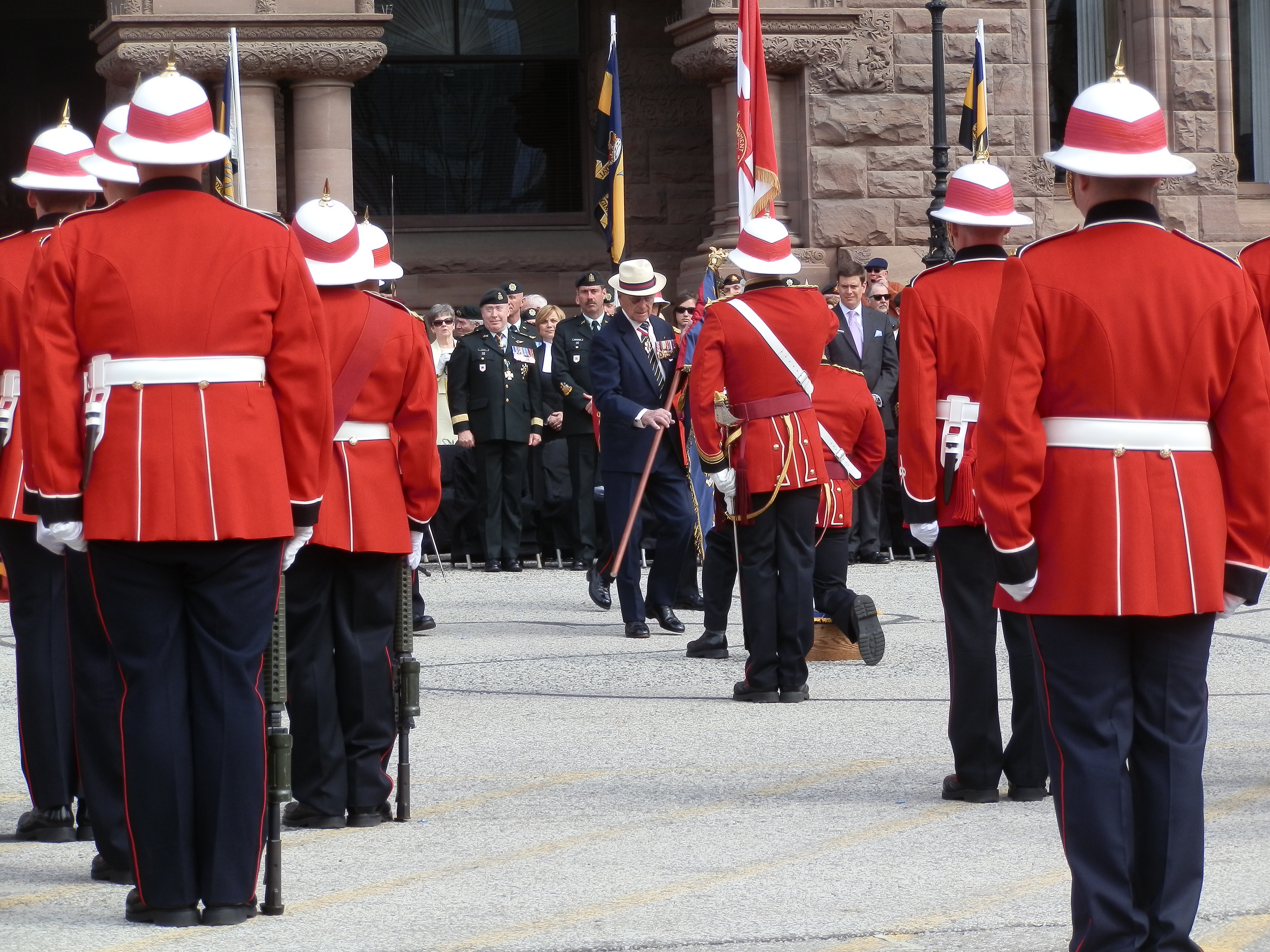
Members of the Royal Canadian Regiment in full dress. The Canadian Army's universal full dress includes a scarlet tunic, midnight blue trousers, and a Wolseley helmet.

The Canadian Army's universal full dress uniforms includes a scarlet tunic, midnight blue trousers with a scarlet trouser stripe, and a Wolseley helmet. However, most regiments in the Canadian Army maintain authorized regimental differences from the Army's universal full dress, including several armoured units, Canadian-Scottish regiments, foot guards, and voltigeur/rifle regiments. Full dress is authorized only for the Royal Canadian Armoured Corps, Royal Regiment of Canadian Artillery and Royal Canadian Infantry Corps. Other army members have no authorized full dress uniform.

Full dress uniforms for the Royal Canadian Air Force (RCAF) consists of a blue plume, where the headdress allows, an air force light blue tunic, trousers and facings. The RCAF pipe band's full dress uniform is modelled after the uniforms used by Scottish Highland regiments. It includes a feather bonnet; air force blue doublet, facings, and pipings; RCAF tartan kilt; and blue garters. Air force full dress is authorized only for pipers and drummers. The full dress uniform for the Royal Canadian Navy includes a dark navy blue tunic, trousers, and white facings. However, full dress in the Royal Canadian Navy is no longer issued.

Regulations for the wear of full dress are contained in the Canadian Forces publication Canadian Forces Dress Instructions, under No. 1B Ceremonial Dress. Amendments to dress regulations are issued through the office of the Vice Chief of the Defence Staff (VCDS), initially in the form of a CANFORGEN (Canadian Forces General) message, which is placed in the dress manual until an official publication amendment can be promulgated.

Dress regulations may also be amplified, interpreted, or amended by the commanders of formations and units (depending on the commander's authority) through the issuing of Standing Orders (SOs), Ship's Standing Orders (SSO), Routine Orders (ROs), and Standard Operating Procedures (SOPs). This may include amplification where the regulations are unclear or are not mandatory; amendments or reversal of some existing regulations for special occasions or events; or the promulgation of regulations regarding the wear of traditional regimental articles (such as kilts).

===== Royal Military College of Canada =====
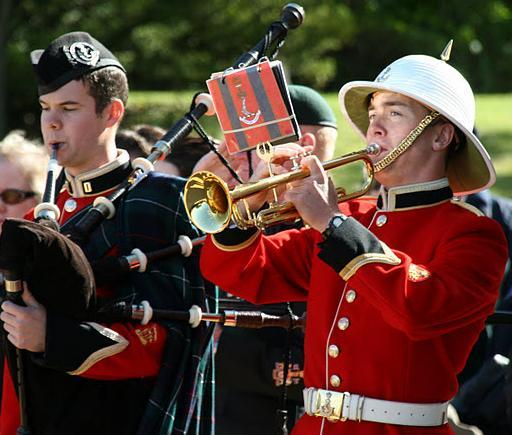
Band members of the Royal Military College of Canada in full dress.

The full dress uniform for an officer cadet of the Royal Military College of Canada is similar to the universal full dress uniform of the Canadian Army, with minor variation. The full dress uniform used by the Royal Military College has remained essentially the same since the institution's founding in 1876, although the pillbox hat has replaced the shako. The pith helmet remains in use for ceremonial parade positions only.

==== Non-military organisations ====
===== Canadian Cadet Organisations =====
The youth cadet programs in Canada, the Royal Canadian Army Cadets, Royal Canadian Sea Cadets and the Royal Canadian Air Cadets each maintain their own dress uniforms. Youth-based Canadian cadet organisations are sponsored by the Canadian Armed Forces, with uniforms provided free of charge and funded by the Department of National Defence. Full dress uniforms worn by cadets are modeled after the organisation's sponsoring service branch.

===== Royal Canadian Mounted Police =====
The modern dress uniform of the Royal Canadian Mounted Police is closely based on the everyday uniforms used by the predecessor North-West Mounted Police in the late nineteenth century. It features the Red Serge, a scarlet British-style military pattern tunic, complete with a high-neck collar and dark blue breeches with yellow stripes derived from British and Canadian cavalry uniforms of the same era, and usually a campaign hat (or "stetson") and brown riding boots.

=== Chile ===
==== Chilean Air Force ====
The full dress uniform of the Chilean Air Force since 2001 has been a medium-blue tunic and trousers, worn with a peaked visor cap. For parade dress, officers additionally wear a sword belt.

==== Chilean Army ====
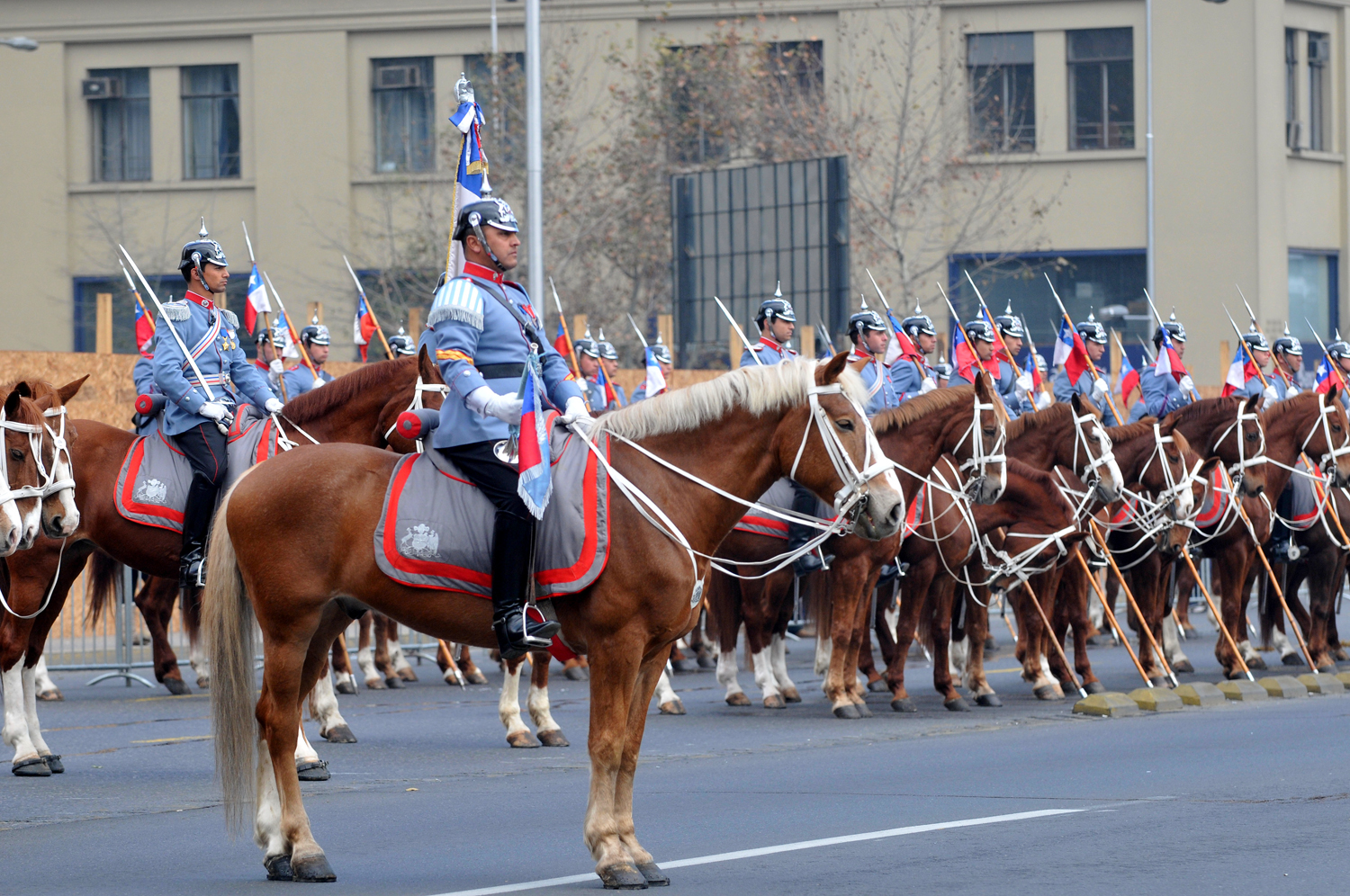
Though full dress uniform in the Chilean Army typically is feldgrau, some units wear more colorful uniforms. Here, a ceremonial cavalry unit wears a dress uniform based on an early twentieth-century uniform of German dragoons.

The usual full dress uniform of the Chilean Army is based on twentieth-century German feldgrau uniforms. Several units wear more colorful full dress uniforms. Cadets of the "Bernardo O'Higgins Riquelme" military academy wear a Prussian blue uniform with Pickelhaube, based on the uniform worn by the Wilhelmine foot guard regiments. Some military units, including the Chacabuco and Rancagua regiments, wear a blue uniform from the War of the Pacific during parades as full dress, with kepis as headdress.

The Buin regiment (2nd Army division in the Santiago Metropolitan region) has reintroduced the infantry regimental uniform of the Chilean War of Independence, having been formed in December 1810 as the 1st Infantry Regiment "Chilean Grenadiers", the original unit of the Chilean Army. The 1st Cavalry Regiment and the Krupp Artillery Battery of the 1st Artillery Regiment, both ceremonial units of the Army, have since 2012 worn the early-twentieth-century Prussian-style full dress uniforms of the Army's cavalry and artillery branches.

==== Chilean Navy ====
The Chilean naval officer's dress uniform is navy-blue with a peaked hat, sword strap (for petty officers, colour escorts and cadets, only during parades and ceremonies), navy-blue trousers, and black boots. The enlisted uniform for sailors evinces a mix of Prussian and British influences, having a sailor cap with the dress) while the Marine enlisted and NCO uniform is a dark-blue naval rig with trousers and a belt plus a peaked cap.

The dress uniform of the "Arturo Prat" naval academy is blue with trousers, with a headdress similar to that worn by Prat and the crew of the Esmeralda during the Battle of Iquique in 1879. The headdress worn is the peaked cap.

=== France ===
As with many European countries, the French military used in the 19th and early 20th centuries many traditional and heavily decorated dress uniforms. Since World War II, they are not in common use and are usually restricted to special units in the French Army and National Gendarmerie. The Air and Space Force and the Navy do not issue full dress uniforms, but for special ceremonies, such as changes of command, military personnel should add swords or daggers and full medals to their service uniform.

In the armed forces, only the Republican Guard plus certain bands and military academies have a complete full dress (grande tenue) uniform issued to all personnel.

==== French Army ====
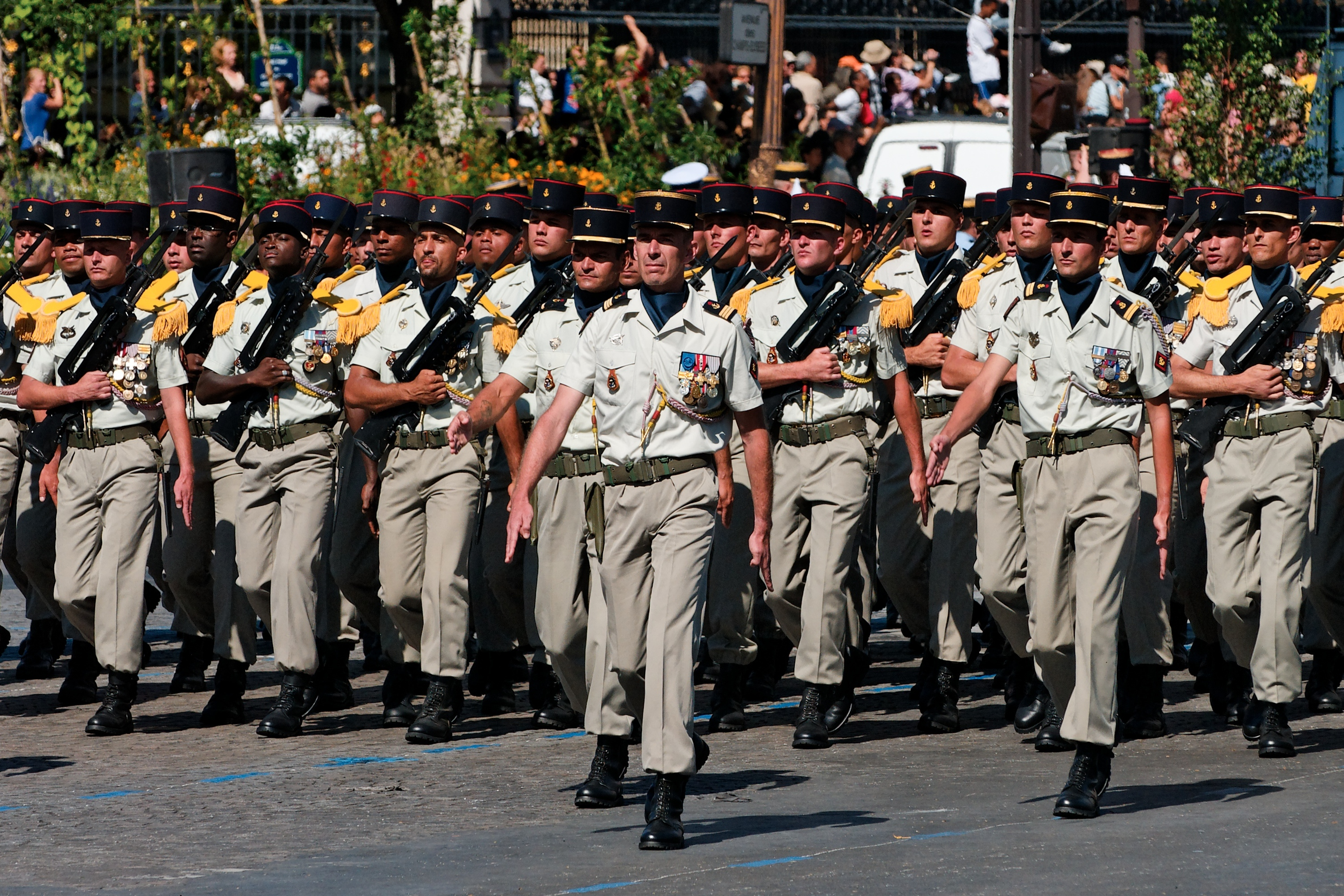
Several units, such as the Troupes de Marine, are permitted to wear more decorated variants of their service dress as their full dress uniform.

Units of the Chasseurs Alpins, French Foreign Legion, Troupes de Marine, 1st Spahi Regiment and Tirailleurs are permitted to wear, in special circumstances such as military parades, a variant of the service or combat uniform which includes items of historic ceremonial dress such as headresses, fringed epaulettes, cloaks, waist sashes etc. This is called "traditional uniform" (tenue de tradition). Personnel of units which were recipients of state orders of military honor include in the traditional uniform the fourragère of the orders received. Headdress worn with such is the kepi.

Bands of the French Army are permitted to wear special uniforms depending on circumstances. On representation duty, they often wear a 19th c.-style full dress uniform dating from either the Napoleonic or Third Republic eras.

===== Military schools =====
Military schools of the French Army, including the école spéciale militaire de Saint-Cyr, the école militaire interarmes and the école nationale des sous-officiers d'active, have full dress uniforms dating back to the 19th century worn by both students and staff. The ESMSC has the shako while the two other schools have the kepi.

In addition to the military schools, the École Polytechnique also maintains 19th century military-styled full dress uniforms. Founded as a military academy, the institution was transformed into a state-sponsored civilian post-secondary school in 1970, although it is still operated by the French Ministry of Defence. It has the bicorne as headdress.

==== National Gendarmerie ====
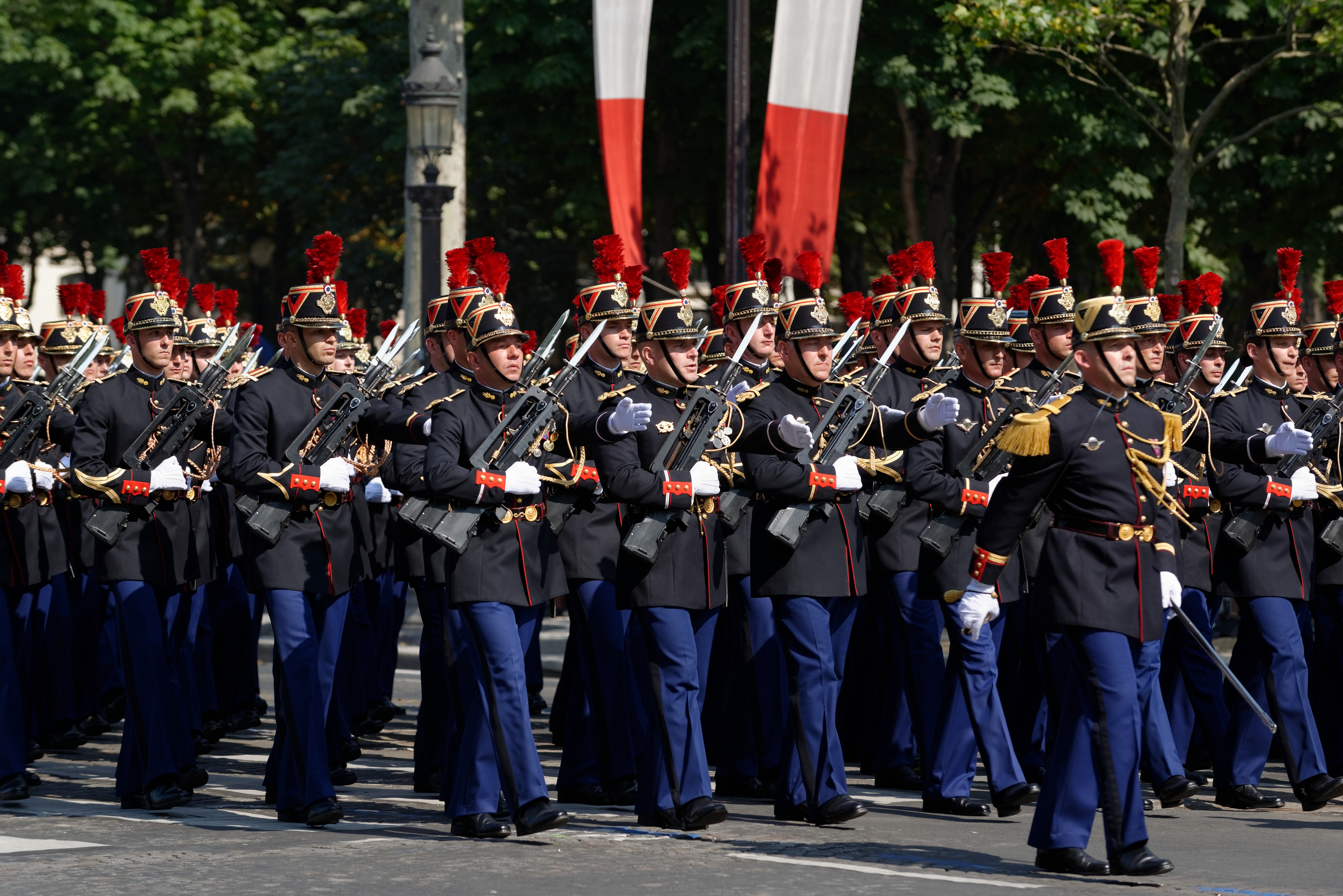
French Republican Guard infantry in full dress uniform.

The Republican Guard of the National Gendarmerie is the last unit to wear full dress uniform as service uniform, as guard of honour detachments are required to wear it while on duty. The cavalry regiment has a 19th-century dragoon uniform, with metal helmet and white riding trousers, while the infantry regiments have a high-collared traditional gendarmerie uniform with the shako. The officer cadets and the staff of école des officiers de la gendarmerie nationale also wear uniforms whose styling dates back to the 19th century.

=== Hungary ===
The current Hungarian Defence Forces has a dress uniform for each of the two branches. Hungarian Ground Forces have the field brown 1993M Ground Forces Dress Uniform (Hungarian: 1993M társasági egyenruha, lit. '1993M Society uniform'). The uniforms are using different coloured branch colours. The Hungarian Air Force branch has a dark blue 1993M Air Force Dress Uniform (Hungarian: 1993M Repülős társasági egyenruha, lit. '1993M Air forces society uniform'). The uniforms' only branch colour is light blue.

The Ground Forces' Hungarian River Guard has the 1995M Naval Dress Uniform (Hungarian: 1995M Hadihajós társasági egyenruha, lit. '1993M Naval society uniform'). The mentioned last two uniforms have a Peaked cap. The Ground Forces have a stiffed field brown Bocskai hat. In winter the field brown or dark blue greatcoat is allowed be worn. The officers variant uniforms has gold shoulder-cords. The sub-officers, enlisted soldiers uniforms don't have the shoulder-cords.

The uniforms are worn with white long sleeved shirts with rank insignia on the shoulder straps, black trousers with generals and officers stripes. Red colour for Ground Forces and light blue for Air Force branch. A full dress white uniform in the same cut as the 1993M Ground Forces Dress Uniform is allowed to wear in specified circumstances, like hot weather climate and weddings. The current active three ceremonial battalions wear the 1993M Ceremonial Uniform called Tihany. The battalions are using for ceremonial purpose the Mannlicher M1895 rifle.

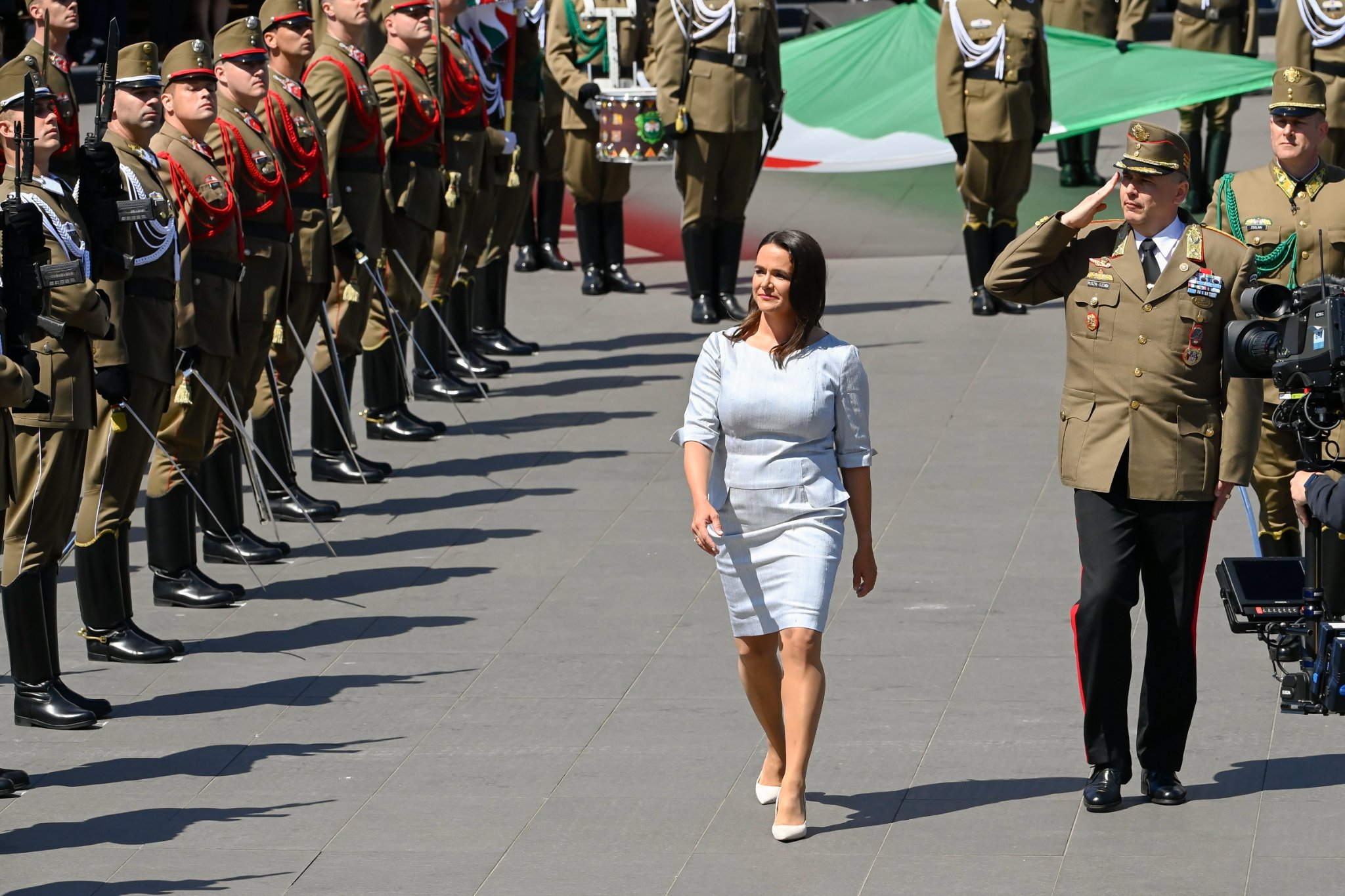
Inauguration of President Katalin Novák, May 14. 2022

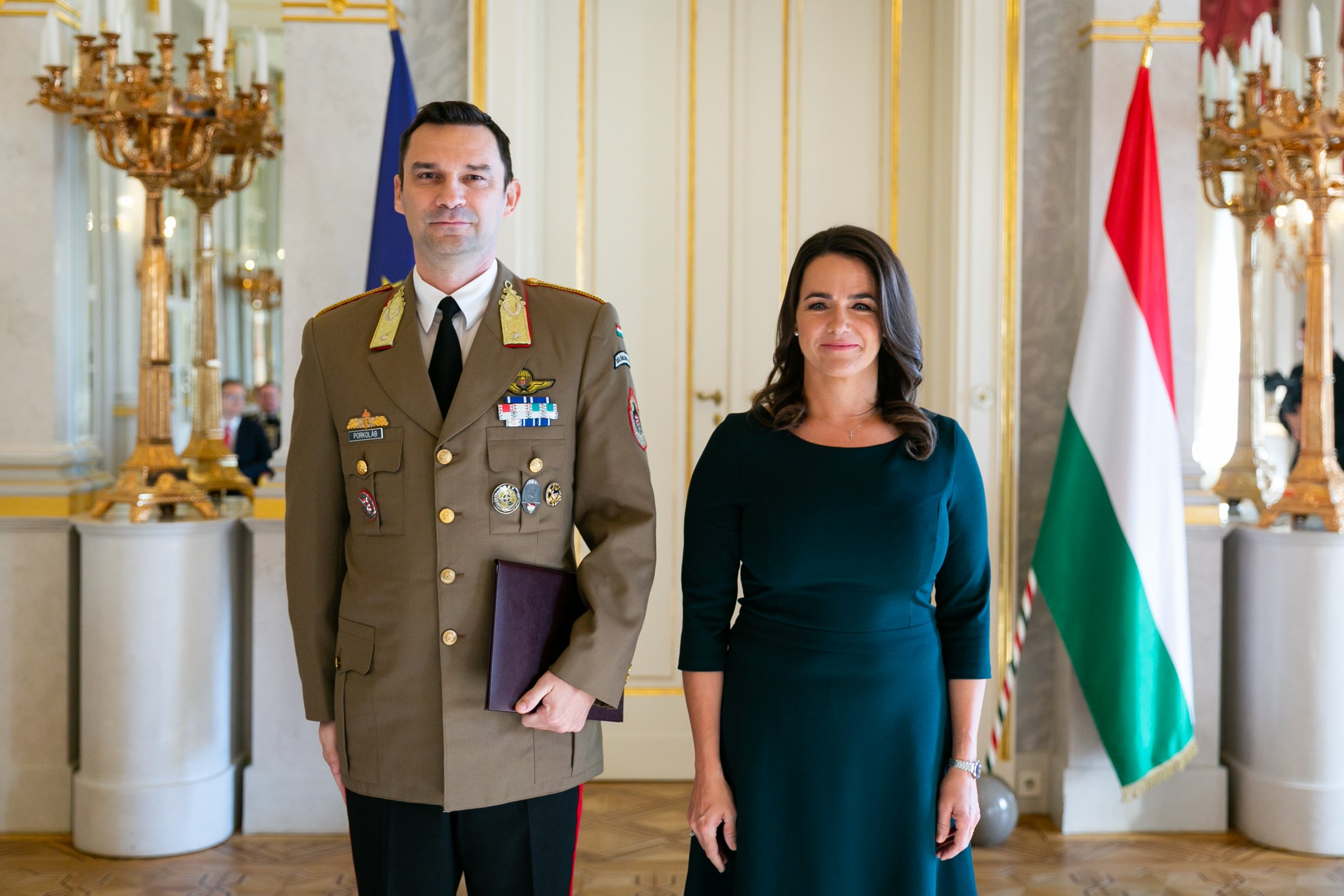
President Katalin Novák promotes Colonel Imre Porkoláb to Brigadier General, October 2022

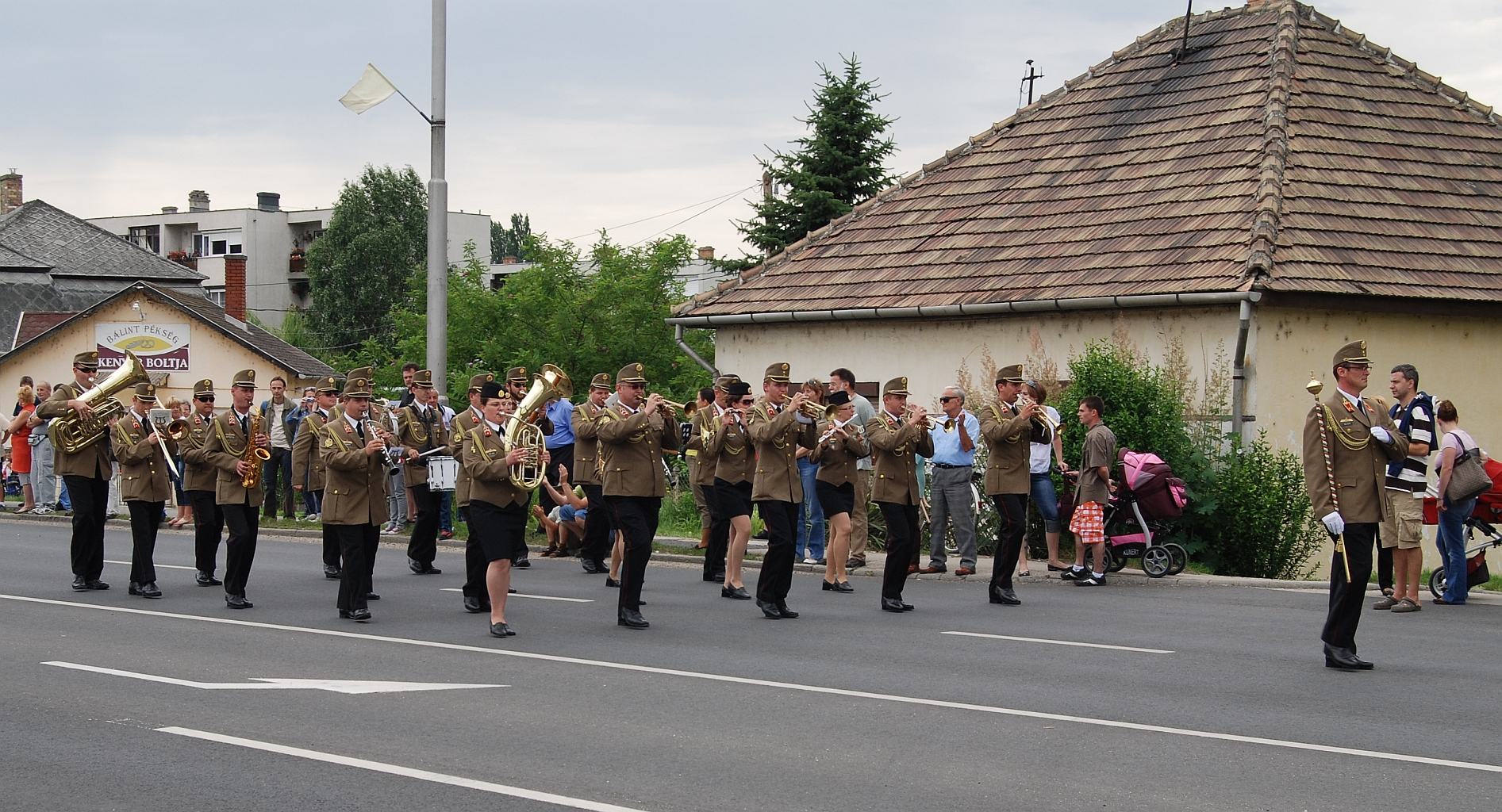
25th Infantry Brigade's Band in Dress Uniform

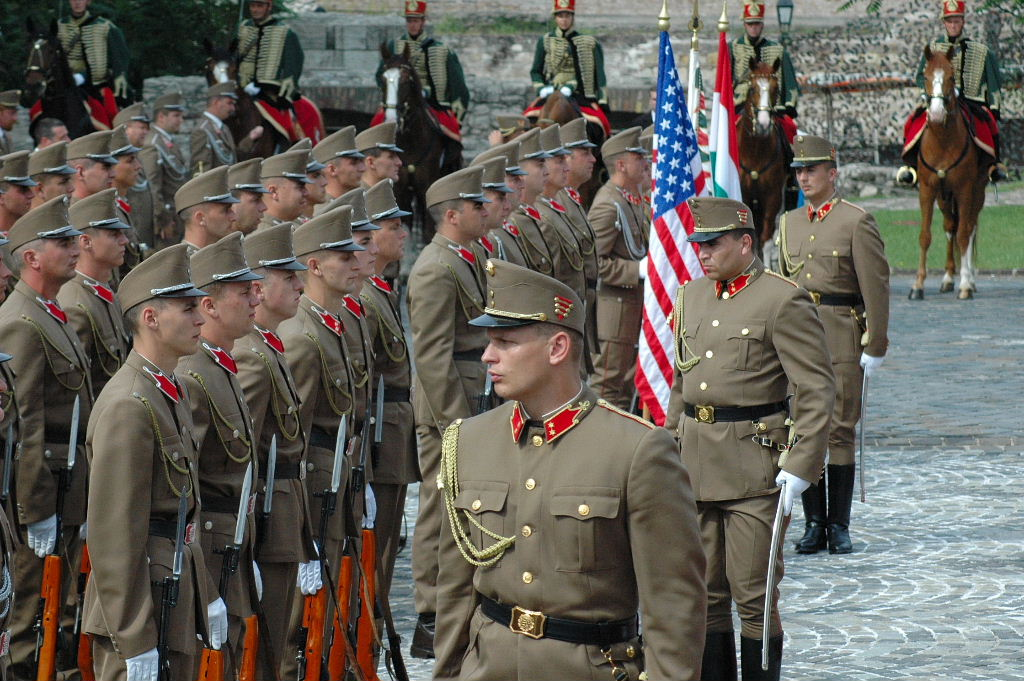
Ceremonial battalion during a welcome for the President of the United States, June 22 2006 Budapest

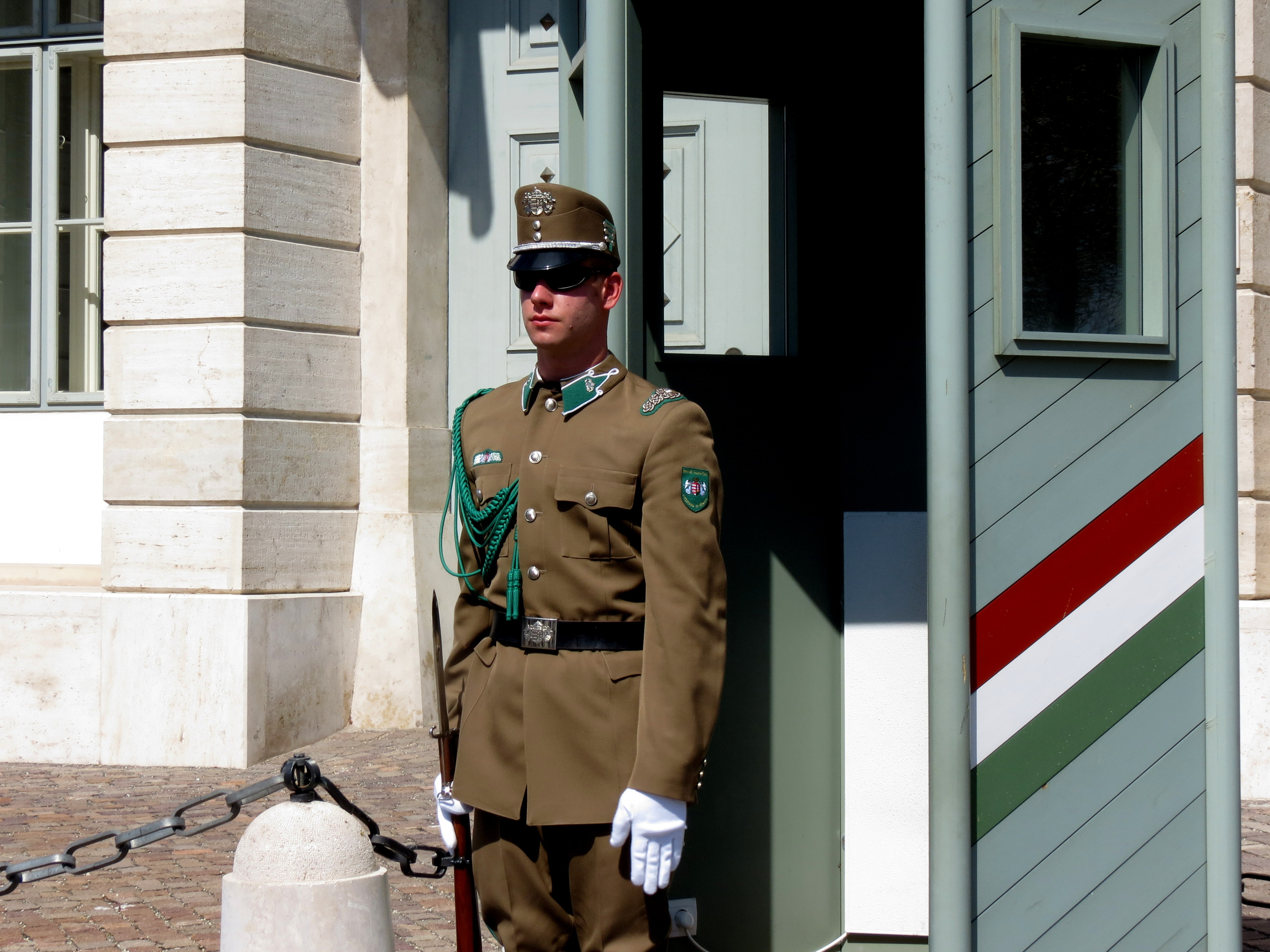
Ceremonial guard at Sándor palace, 2013 Budapest

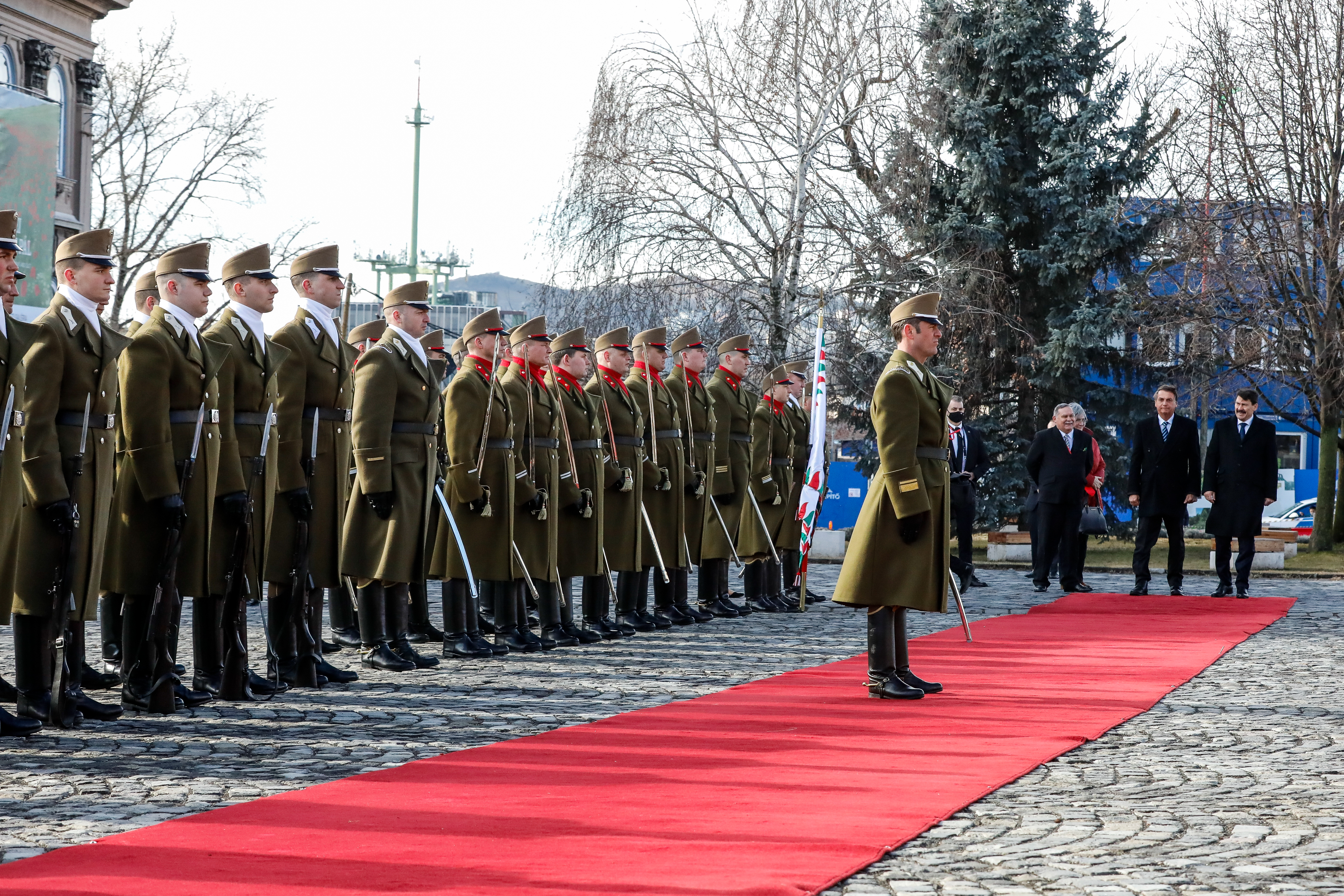
Ceremonial guard at Sándor palace, 2022 Budapest

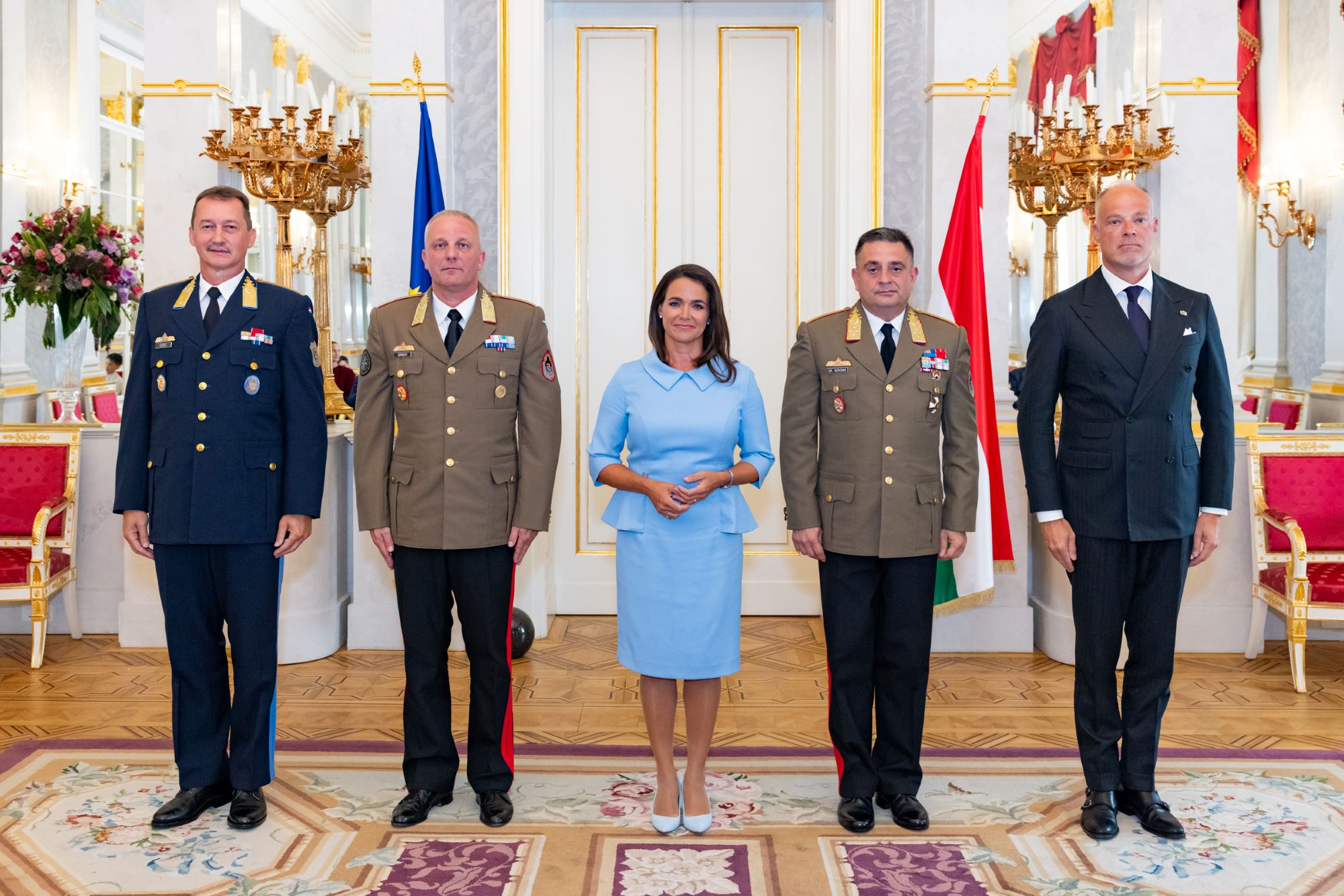
President Katalin Novák promotes Colonels to Brigadier General, Sándor palace, August 15 2023

During the period of 1928-1945 the Royal Hungarian Army had multiple dress uniforms for both officers and sub-officers. In 1928 the Royal Hungarian Army adopted the 1928M Full Dress Uniform (Hungarian: 1928M Nagytársasági egyenruha, lit. '1928M Grand society uniform') for White tie events. The jacket came first with a shoulder-cord on the left shoulder, but was eliminated shortly after introduction. The colours of the uniforms waried: light blue for generals, branch colours for officers. In 1931 the uniform was simplyfied and became cheaper to produce and became the 1931M Full Dress Uniform.

In 1931, a new uniform was also introduced in the form of 1931M Dress Uniform Hungarian: 1931M Kistársasági egyenruha, lit. '1931M Small society uniform'). The uniform was adopted to Black tie events. The colours of the uniforms matched the colours of the 1928M or 1931M Full Dress Uniform. These uniforms were worn with a black officers hat, black trousers with red generals and officers stripes and white gloves. During summer time above the jackets the officers could wear a cape Hungarian: pelerin, lit. 'cloak'). During winter the officers brown grandcoat could be worn.

General officers who were adjutants of the Regent of Hungary, Ministers of Defence, and Chief of General Staff also could wear a special red Ceremonial dress uniform. Above the red jacket called atilla the proper wear was a white Pelisse, worn slung over one shoulder.

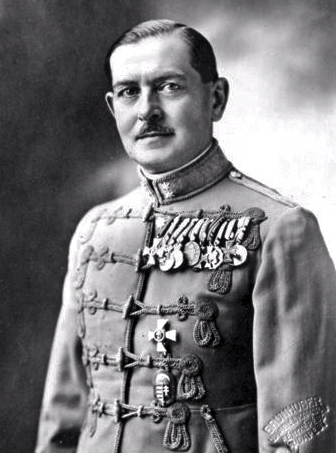
Lieutenant General Gusztáv Jány in his 1928M Full Dress Uniform

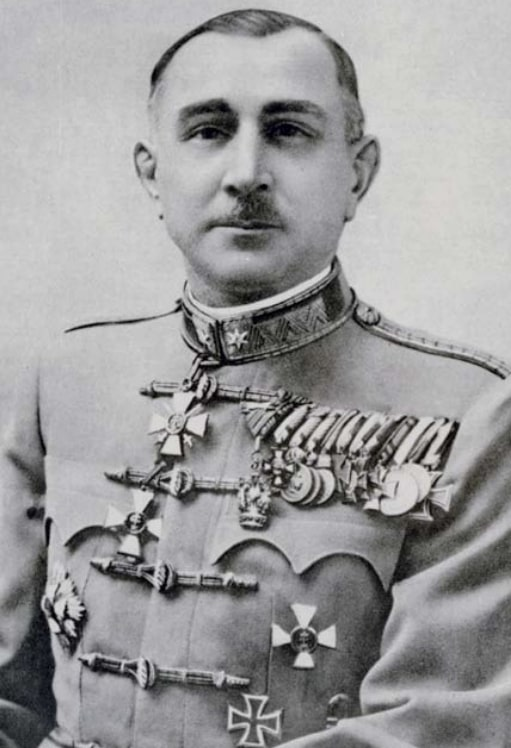
General János Vörös in his 1931M dress uniform

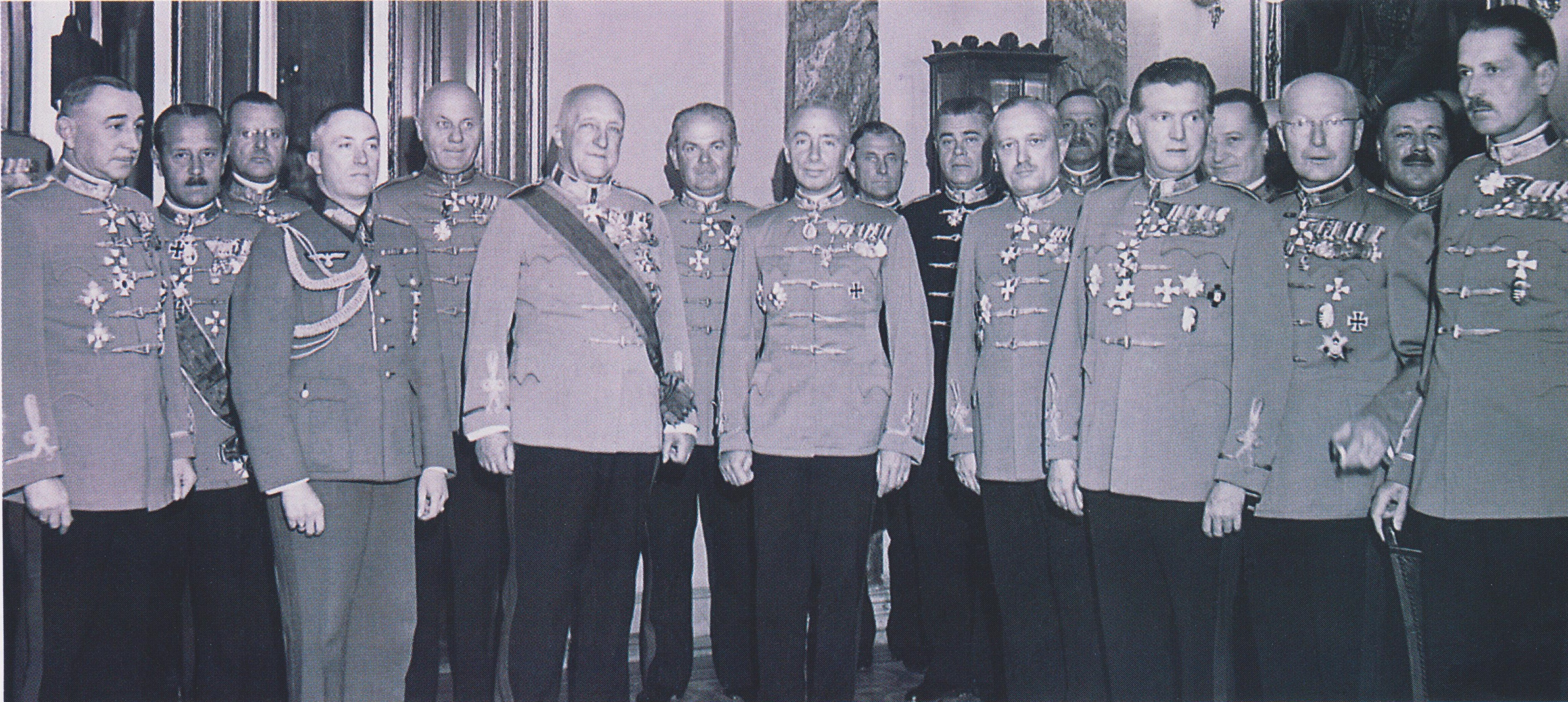
General Staff of the Hungarian Royal Army in 1944 in 1931M dress uniform

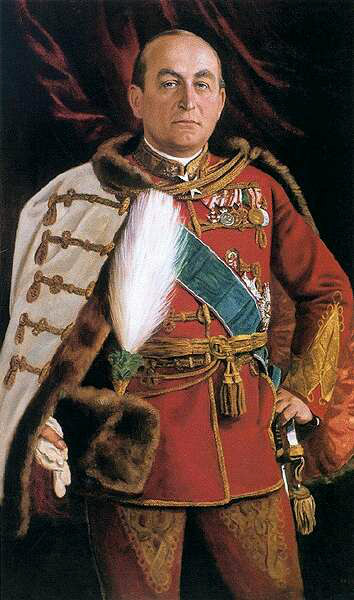
Prime Minister Gyula Gömbös de Jákfa in his Ceremonial Uniform

=== Indonesia ===
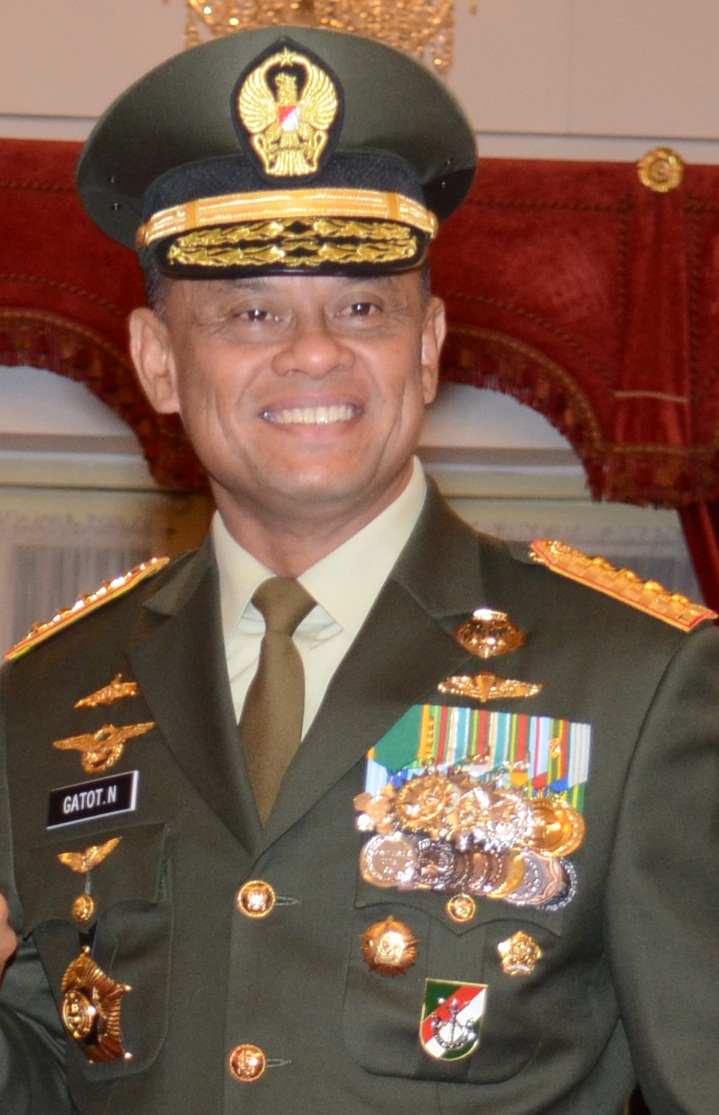
Former Indonesian Army general Gatot Nurmantyo dressed in PDU I, the Indonesian Army's equivalent to full dress uniform

The Indonesian National Armed Forces, Indonesian National Police, and other uniformed institutions of the country have their own types of Dress uniforms known as "PDU", an abbreviation from Pakaian Dinas Upacara literally meaning "ceremonial uniform" in Indonesian; worn during formal occasions and when attending ceremonies. The Dress uniform (PDU) of the National Armed Forces consists of several categories which are:

- PDU I - (Service medals and brevets attached)
- PDU IA - (Order decorations attached and honorary sash worn over for those who are entitled to wear it)
- PDU II - (Mess dress uniform)
- PDU IIA - (Mess dress uniform with order decorations attached)
- PDU III - (Service ribbons attached)
- PDU IV - (Short sleeved, with no necktie worn).

Each uniform category is worn for different purposes and for certain occasions. The "PDU I" and "PDU IA" are regarded as "full dress uniforms" which are worn for formal state occasions and when attending ceremonial events of high significance. The headdress worn for this uniform is a peaked cap for men and a crusher cap for women, and for officers from special forces, as well as the Military Police, may wear their respective berets. MPs are also entitled to helmets when in full dress. When wearing the Mess dress uniform, no headdress is worn.

The "PDU III" uniform is worn during receptions and/or during the welcoming ceremony of a visiting high ranking foreign guest (head of state or head of government). While the "PDU IV" uniform is worn for occasions such as: Change of Command ceremonies, attending a passing out parade, and worn by military judges in the court. The mess dress uniform is basically the same for the three branches of the armed forces.

For male Indonesian Navy officers wearing the full dress uniform ("PDUs" I and IA), will always carry his dress sabre wherever he goes. Female personnel and officers carry a dress uniform purse, except for those in command posts which are also entitled to sabres. Enlisted ratings of the Indonesian Navy wear Japanese style dixie caps with the full dress. Until 2021, the US design was worn. The new styled cap is modeled after the Japanese custom in the Maritime Self-Defense Force, the design used by many European navies. Those in the Marine Corps and Denjaka wear a purple beret. Special forces operators of KOPASKA wear a maroon beret.

For ceremonial parades, a variant known as Pakaian Dinas Parade (PDP, Parade Full Dress) is worn by parade commanders. PDP can also be a variant of the combat dress uniform pattern. The parade commander wears a M1 or PASGT helmet instead of the normal peaked cap.

=== Israel ===
Each arm of the Israeli Defence Force (IDF) ground forces, Navy and Air Force has its own dress uniform, with separate versions for summer and winter. These are similar in style to civilian business dress suits, or to the service dress uniforms worn by the British forces. The dress uniform includes a blazer-type jacket, worn with a white shirt, and a tie. The ground forces uniform is dark green, with a single-breasted, three-buttoned jacket and tie of the same colour. Headgear worn is the beret. The air force uniform is of the same design, but medium blue. The naval uniform has a darker blue, double-breasted, six-buttoned jacket, with gold-coloured rank insignia on the cuffs, worn with the peaked cap.

In 2016, the IDF Chief of General Staff Gadi Eizenkot announced that all officers ranked Tat Aluf (brigadier general) as well as certain lower ranked officers would wear the Madei Srad dress uniforms in official ceremonies on Yom HaShoah, Yom Hazikaron and Yom Ha'atzmaut. Because of the small number of uniforms required they are tailor made for the specific officer. Prior to 2016, the dress uniform, the Madei Srad was only worn abroad, either by a military attaché or by senior officers on official state visits.

=== Russia ===
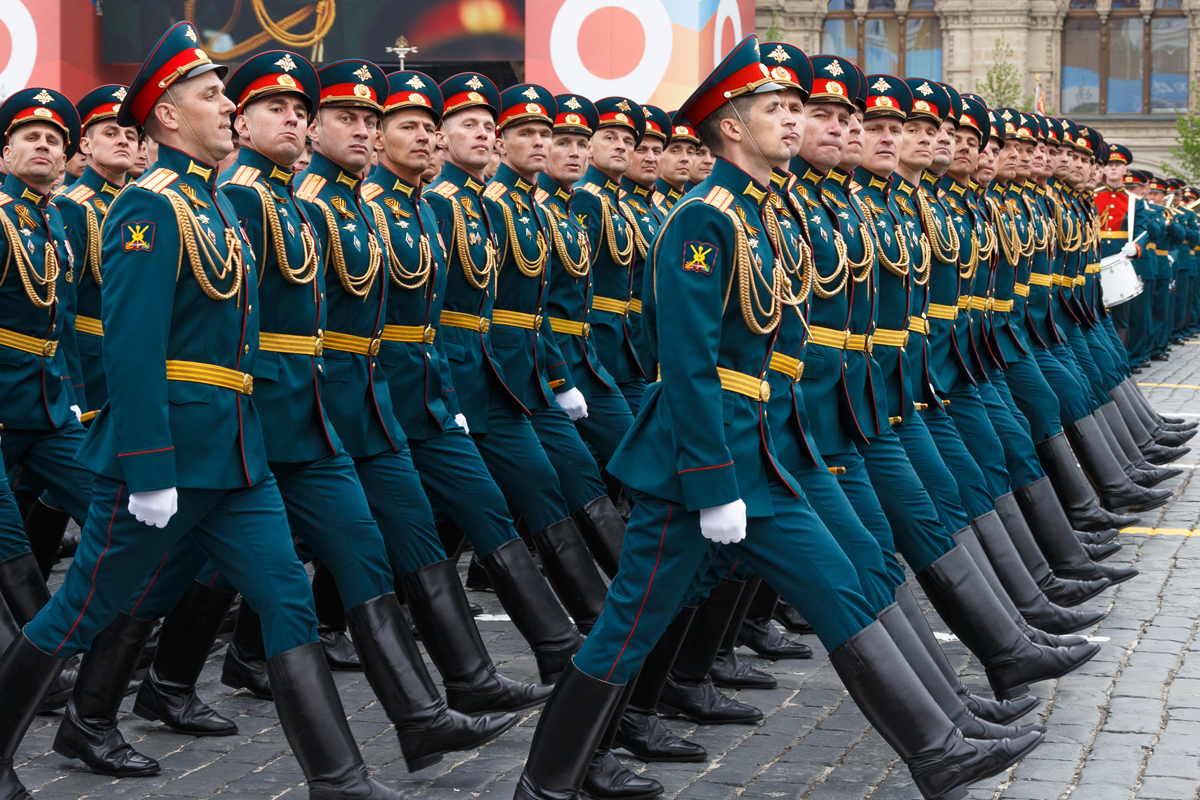
Russian Ground Forces officers during the 2019 Moscow Victory Day Parade in full dress uniform.

The uniforms of the Russian Armed Forces were inherited from the Soviet Armed Forces and modified throughout the years. Some features of modern full dress uniform worn by both army and navy personnel date from those of the final Czarist period, prior to 1917. Most notably these include the blue-green shade of the modern army officer's parade and walking out uniform; the dark blue and white dress uniform worn by sailors; and the ceremonial dress of the Kremlin Regiment.

=== Sweden ===
Various forms of full dress uniforms were used by all regiments of the Swedish Armed Forces for ceremonial purposes until the 1960s, when they were generally discontinued, with the exception of the Svea Life Guards and the Life Guard Dragoons still retaining colourful full dress uniforms of 19th century origin for ceremonial use. The remaining parts of the branches tend to apply a variant of the mess dress uniform called "full mess uniform" for formal wear purposes. White spats and belts may also be added to their service dress uniforms for parades or certain ceremonial purposes.

==== Swedish Army ====
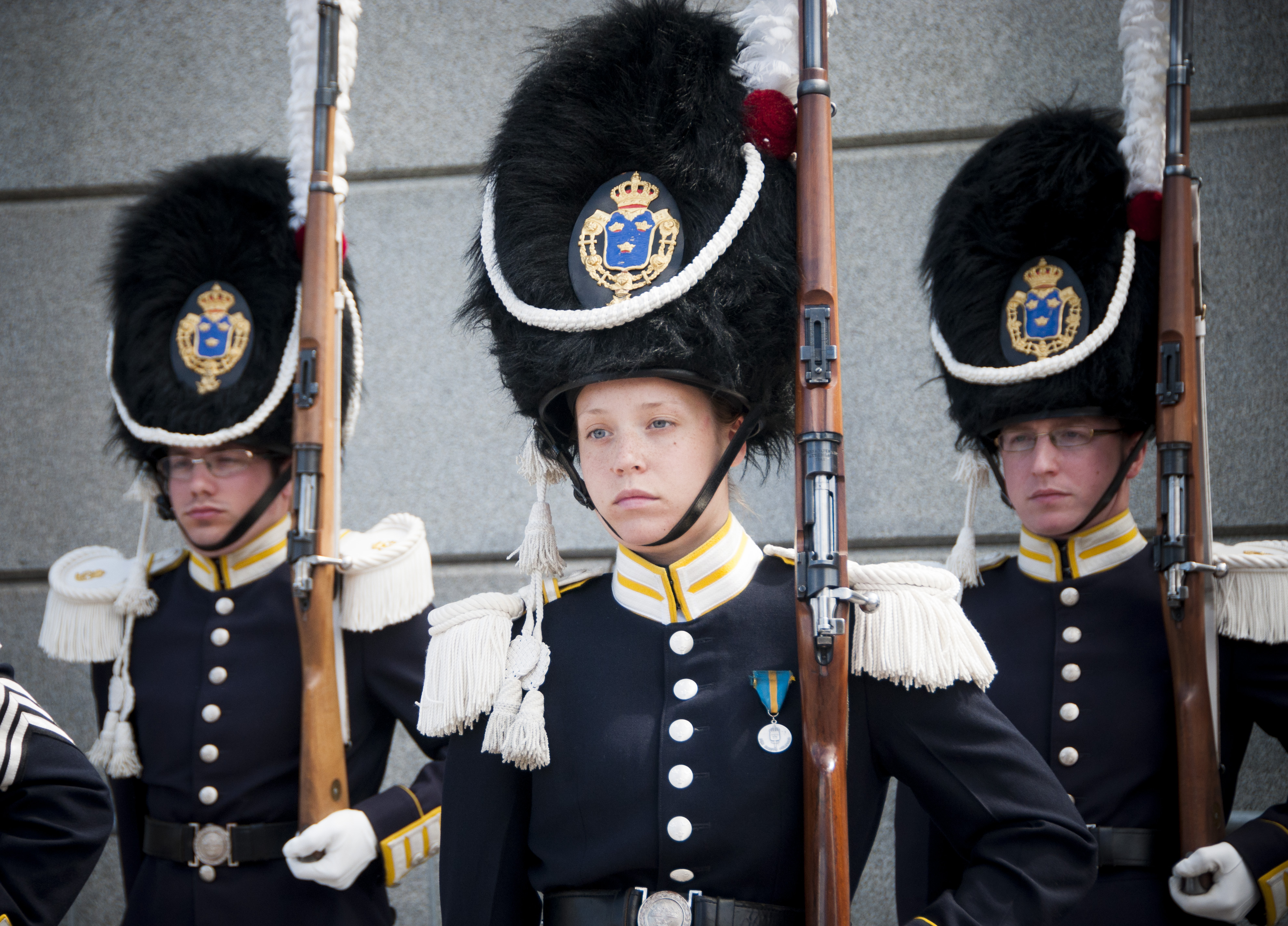
Grenadiers of the Swedish Life Guards in full dress uniform

There are three versions of full dress uniforms in use in the Swedish Army as of the present day, all belonging to the Life Guards. The infantry wears the dark blue uniform of the Svea Life Guards (1st Life Guards) with yellow collar, cuffs and piping which dates back to 1886. The Swedish Army Band wears the uniform of Göta Life Guards (2nd Life Guards), with red collar, cuffs and piping. The headdress of the infantry is mainly the pickelhaube typed helmet in black leather from 1887. On state ceremonies, a white buffalo hair plume is added. Bearskin hats dating from 1823 are still in use on special occasions.

The cavalry, including the Swedish Cavalry Band, wear the royal blue uniform of the Life Guard Dragoons (1st Cavalry) from 1895. Officers have a somewhat lighter colour on their full dress uniform compared to the troopers. The pickelhaube type helmet is made of nickel-plated steel with brass details and dates back to 1879. Changes were made in 1900 which transformed the helmet into a cuirassier style helmet.

In 1928, with the amalgamation of the 1st and 2nd Cavalry Regiments, a helm wreath was added, together with a golden laurel wreath. Officers' gold chin straps with lion "mascarons" from the Life Regiment Dragoons (2nd Cavalry) were also authorised for the new composite regiment. On modern state occasions officers wear white buffalo hair plume while troopers wear a horse hair plumes of the same colour.

==== Swedish Navy ====
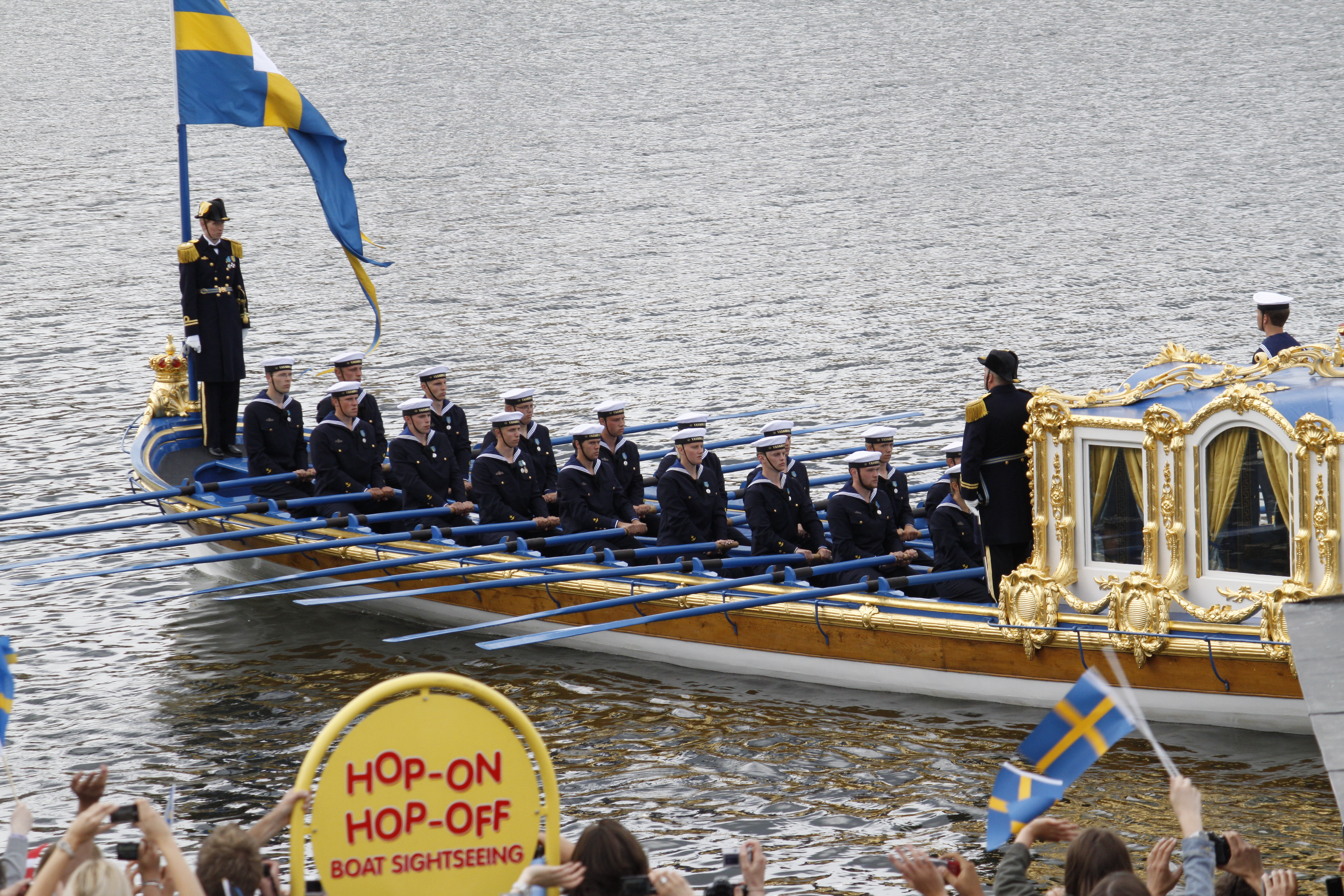
Two officers in full dress on the royal barge Vasaorden. In the Swedish Navy, full dress is restricted to naval officers serving on the Vasaorden

In the Swedish Navy, only one ceremonial uniform is still in use. It is restricted to naval officers serving on the royal barge "Vasaorden" (Order of Vasa); a ship used only on rare ceremonial occasions. The uniform dates back to 1878. The two officers serving wear the tricorne.

=== United Kingdom ===
==== Royal Navy ====
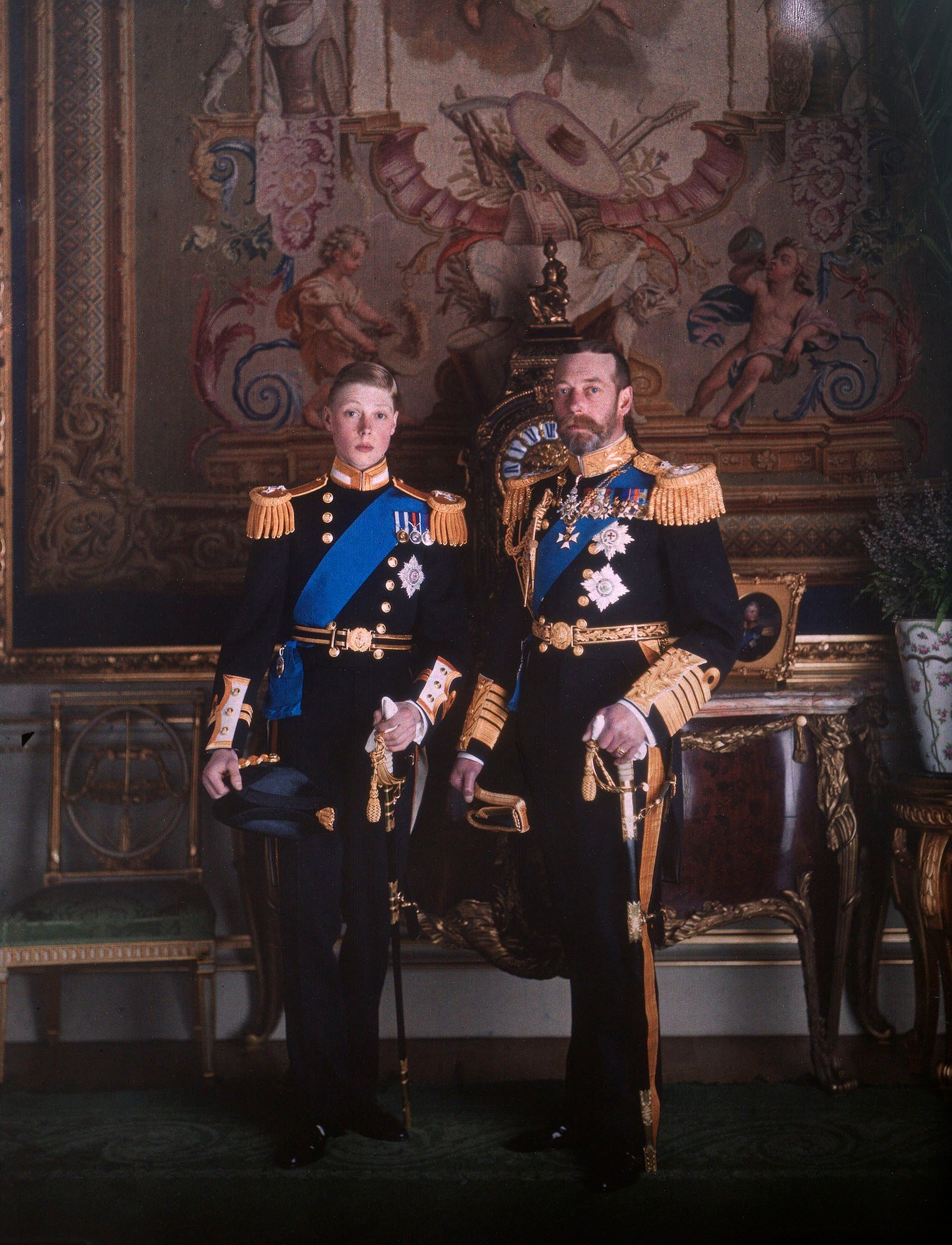
The Prince of Wales (Lieutenant RN, left) and King George V (Admiral of the Fleet, right) wearing full dress naval uniform in 1914.

Since the mid-18th century, when naval uniforms were introduced, flag officers had different full-dress and undress versions. Undress was worn from day to day, with full-dress on formal occasions. By the late nineteenth century, an officer's full dress uniform consisted of a navy double-breasted tailcoat with white facings edged in gold on the collar and cuff-slashes, gold lace indicating rank on the cuffs, epaulettes, sword and sword-belt, worn with gold-laced trousers (except for sublieutenants and warrant officers) and a cocked hat.

This order of uniform lasted through the first half of the twentieth century. It was not worn for the duration of the Second World War, and was officially placed 'in abeyance' in 1949, with permission being given at the same time for medals and swords to be worn with the undress jacket on state occasions. Full dress was worn by senior naval officers at the coronation of Elizabeth II.

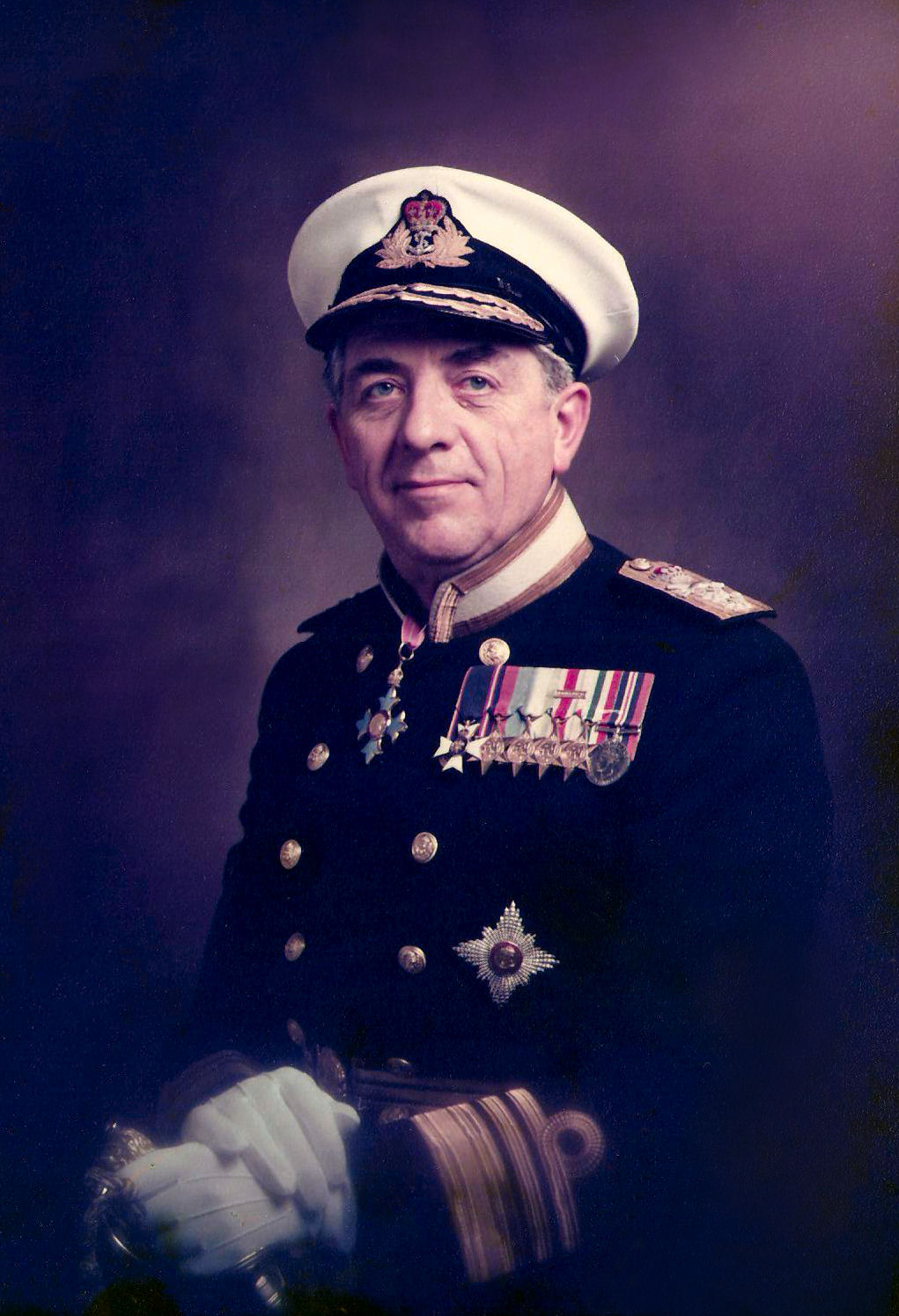
Vice Admiral Philip Watson in ceremonial day dress. Introduced in 1959, ceremonial day dress is a simpler variant of the Royal Navy's full dress uniform that was taken out of service in 1956.

In 1959, recognising the need for a more formal uniform for flag officers, RN ceremonial day dress was introduced: this is similar to the old full dress but is less elaborate, without fringed epaulettes or cuff slashes, and is worn with a peaked cap. It is worn only by very limited categories of senior flag officers, namely members of the Royal Family, the First Sea Lord, Admirals of the Fleet, full Admirals and the Defence Services Secretary, if a naval officer.

In tropical climates, a single-breasted white tunic, with two patch pockets, five buttons down the front, worn with the peaked cap, white trousers, white shoes, shoulderboards and sword and sword belt is worn by commissioned officers. Before 1939, this was worn with a white tropical helmet. It was abolished in 1949, for full dress purposes. Since 1995 this is only regularly issued to officers of the rank of captain and above, all other officers being issued a white bush jacket, but are issued this uniform from stores if ordered to by command.

There is a version for warrant officers and petty officers. It is similar to that worn by commissioned officers. It has the same cap, trousers and shoes, but the tunic has only four buttons down the front, substantive rate badges, and no shoulderboards. When armed with a rifle, this is worn with anklets and white web belt and black boots. This is worn only on extremely formal occasions, usually by guards of honour, at the order of command. Warrant officers first class wear the appropriate sword and sword belt as well.

===== Royal Marines =====
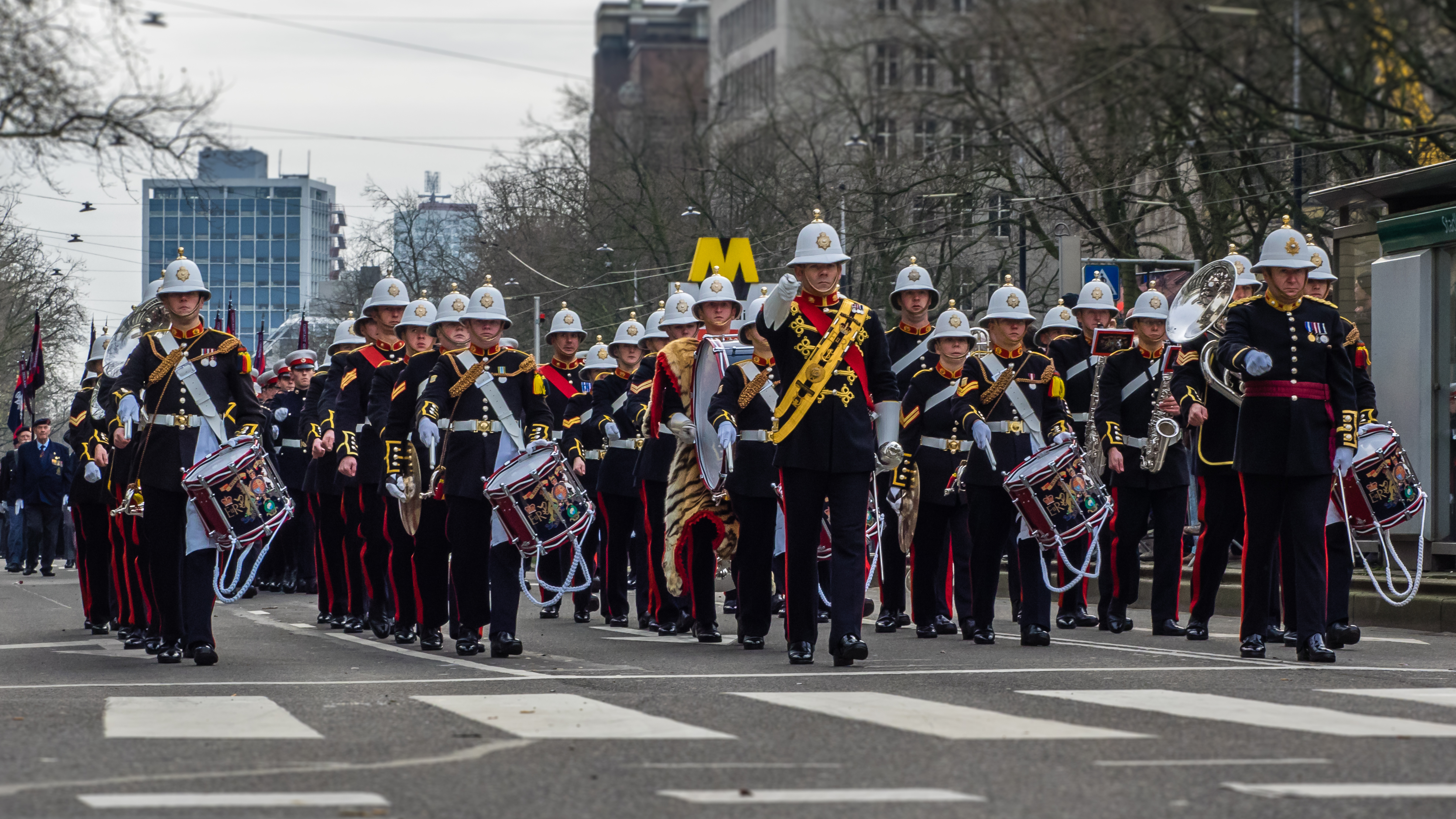
The Band of Her Majesty's Royal Marines in full dress uniform in 2015, led by the Drum Major (centre) and Director of Music (right)

In the Royal Marines, Number 1A dress or "blues" is generally worn by units undertaking ceremonial duties.

The Number 1 Full Dress is now only worn by the Royal Marines Band Service. The full dress dates from 1923, when the Royal Marine Light Infantry and the Royal Marine Artillery merged into what became the Corps of Royal Marines. It consists of a royal blue single-breasted tunic with red facings, with gold piping and yellow cuff slashes. It is worn with royal blue trousers with a scarlet stripe, and the Wolseley helmet with a golden ball ornament on top of the helmet, inherited from the Royal Marine Artillery.

Band officers (directors of music) wear gold shoulder cords with silver-embroidered rank badges and a crimson waist sash, similar to the waist sash worn by the British Army. The uniform of the drum major features hussar-style braiding across the front of the tunic. Buglers wear dress cords, which were first introduced to the buglers branch in 1935 for London duties.

==== British Army ====
Most of the uniforms worn by the British Army today originate in former combat uniforms. At the start of the 19th century, British Army Regiments of Foot, trained to fight in the manner dictated by the musket, which demanded close proximity to the target, were not concerned with camouflage, and wore red coats, scarlet for officers and sergeants. Rifle regiments, fighting as skirmishers, and equipped with rifles, were more concerned with concealment, and wore dark green uniforms. Light infantry regiments were also trained as skirmishers but wore red uniforms with green shakos. Whereas the infantry generally wore polished brass buttons and white carrying equipment, the Rifles wore black.

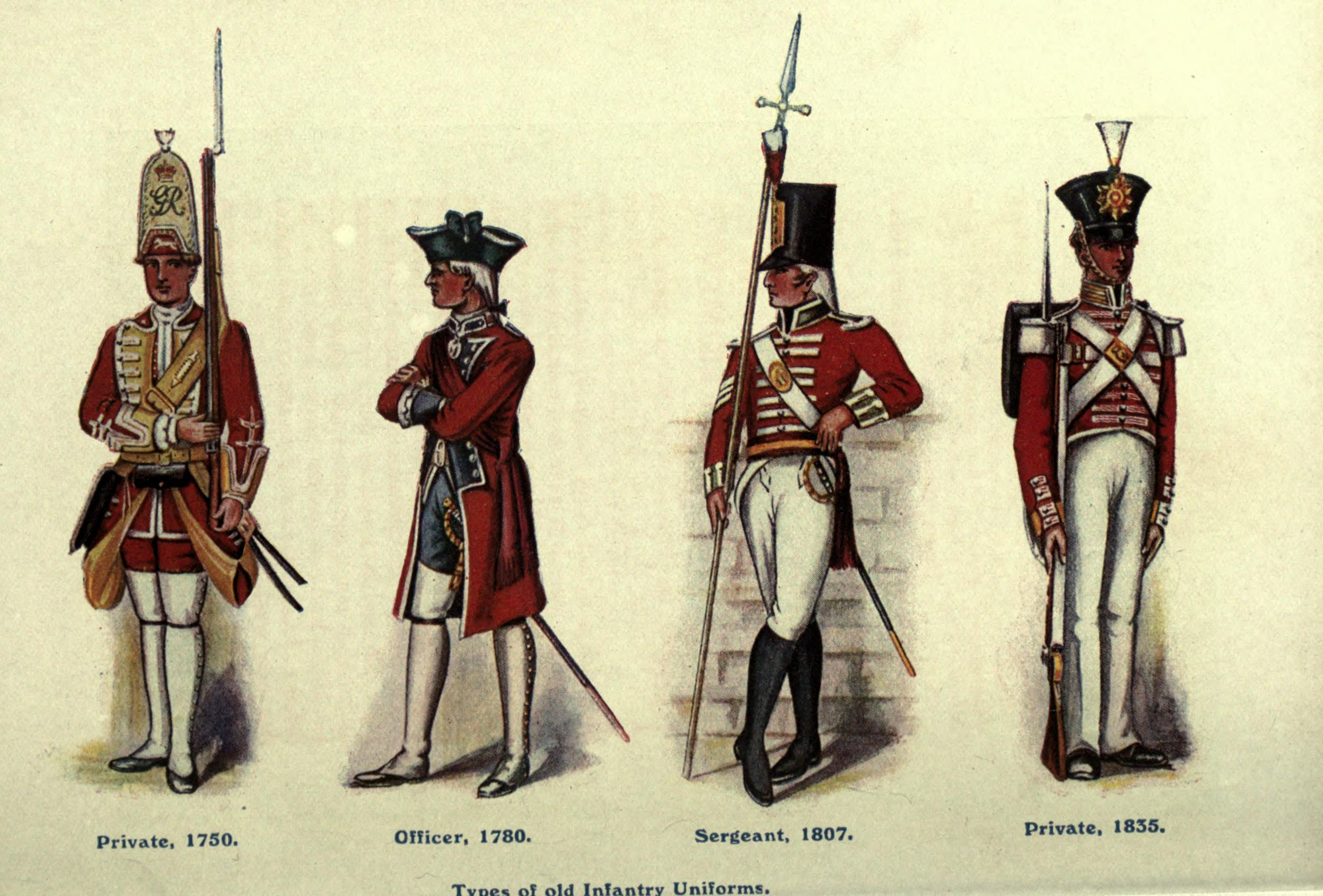
Infantry uniforms of the British Army, from 1750 to 1835. Full dress uniforms in the British Army originate from former combat uniforms.

Prior to the outbreak of World War I full dress uniforms were universal issue for all regiments of the British Army when on "home service" in Britain. Line infantry and Foot Guards, dragoons, Life Guards and Royal Engineers all wore scarlet tunics. The Royal Regiment of Artillery, hussars, all but one lancer regiment, and all support corps wore dark blue uniforms. Only Rifle regiments wore green. Full dress varied greatly in detail, according to the arm of service, or in many cases the individual regiment.

Reserve units were for the most part distinguished by having silver (rather than gold-coloured) lace, buttons and accoutrements in full dress. From the Crimean War on, a narrow red stripe (piping) down the outside of each trouser leg was common to all red coated infantry units. Cavalry wore stripes of regimental colour (white, yellow, blue/grey etc.) on their riding breeches. Scottish Highland regiments wore kilts, and Scottish Lowland regiments adopted tartan trews. All Scottish regiments wore doublets of distinctive cut instead of the tunics of English, Irish and Welsh units.

Full dress headwear varied, both from regiment to regiment, and over time as influenced by military fashion. Bearskins were worn by the Foot Guards, the 2nd Dragoons (Royal Scots Greys) and in a different form by Fusiliers. Plumed helmets were worn by the Dragoons (except 2nd), Dragoon Guards and the Household Cavalry. Hussars wore their distinctive busby, which was adopted by the Royal Artillery, the Royal Engineers and certain other Corps. It was also worn in a different form by Rifle regiments.

The Lancers had their chapka. Infantry of the line often wore shakos, later supplanted by the 'home service helmet', as did others. Scots and Irish regiments tended to have their own distinctive full-dress headwear. General officers and staff officers usually wore plumed cocked hats in full dress, as did regimental staff officers and those of some support services. In hotter climates, for all of the above, a white pith helmet was often substituted.

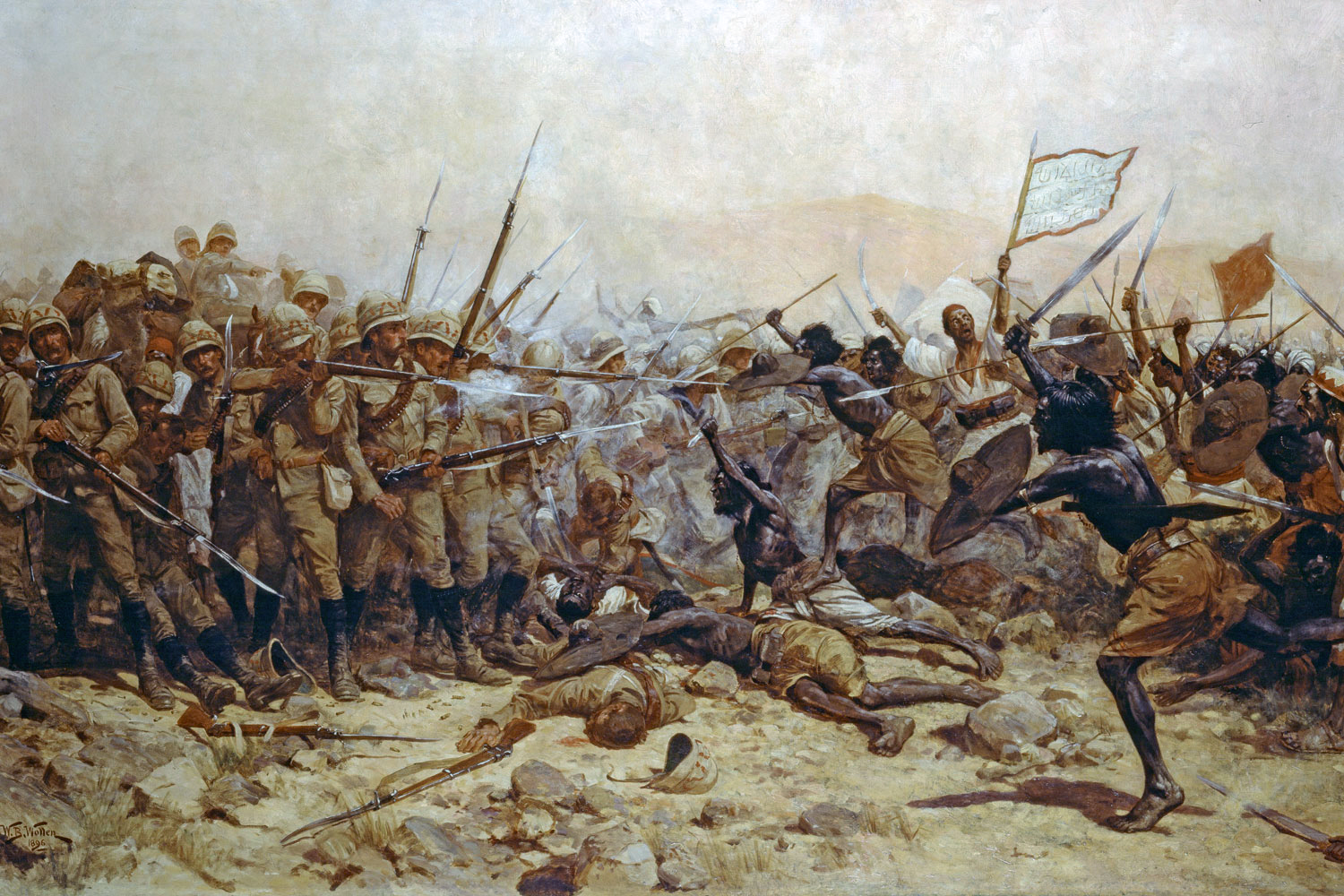
The rise of rifles and smokeless powder led to the adoption of less visible khaki uniforms in the field, with blue, scarlet, and rifle green tunics relegated to ceremonial/parade use.

Beginning with the Second Anglo-Afghan War of 1878, the British Army began adopting light khaki uniforms for Tropical service that was first introduced in 1848 with the Corps of Guides in India. This innovation arose from experience fighting irregular forces in India, for example on the Indian North-West Frontier and during the Indian Mutiny, and in Africa during the Anglo-Zulu War, and the invention of smokeless gunpowder and the increasing effectiveness and usage of rifles.

In 1902, a darker shade of Service Dress (SD) was adopted for field and ordinary use in Britain itself. The scarlet, blue and rifle green uniforms were retained for wear as full dress on parade and "walking-out dress" when off duty and out of barracks. As worn between 1902 and 1914 by all non-commissioned ranks, walking-out dress was essentially the same as review order, except that a peaked cap or glengarry was worn instead of the full dress headdress, and overalls (strapped trousers) were substituted for cavalry breeches.

When khaki web carrying equipment was introduced, the earlier, white or black leather carrying equipment was retained for wear with the dress uniform. As with the earlier uniforms, the officers' uniforms differed in quality and detail from those worn by the other ranks. Officers purchased their own dress uniforms from regimentally approved tailors while other ranks were issued all orders of dress from government stocks.

With the outbreak of World War I in August 1914, all full dress and other coloured uniforms ceased to be worn by the British Army. After 1919 they were restored to the Household Cavalry and Foot Guard for ceremonial purposes, but not to the bulk of the army. Officers were authorised to wear full dress for certain special occasions such as Court levees (formal presentations to the Monarch), and it was customary to wear these uniforms at social functions such as weddings.

By 1928, bands were wearing full dress on occasions where they were not parading with the remainder of the regiment, who had only khaki service dress. The pre-1914 dress uniforms were still held in store and occasionally reappeared for historic displays. There was no serious attempt to make them general issue again, primarily for reasons of expense. When khaki Battle Dress (BD) uniforms, which had a short blouse instead of a tunic, were adopted immediately before the Second World War, the older khaki Service Dress became a smart uniform for wear on the streets, and on moderately formal occasions.

After World War II the coloured, full dress uniforms were reintroduced for ceremonial occasions by the Brigade of Guards and to a limited extent by regimental bands. From about 1956 on, officers, and later senior non-commissioned officers, resumed wearing mess uniforms in traditional colours. These are still worn, although regimental amalgamations have led to numerous changes from the pre-war models.

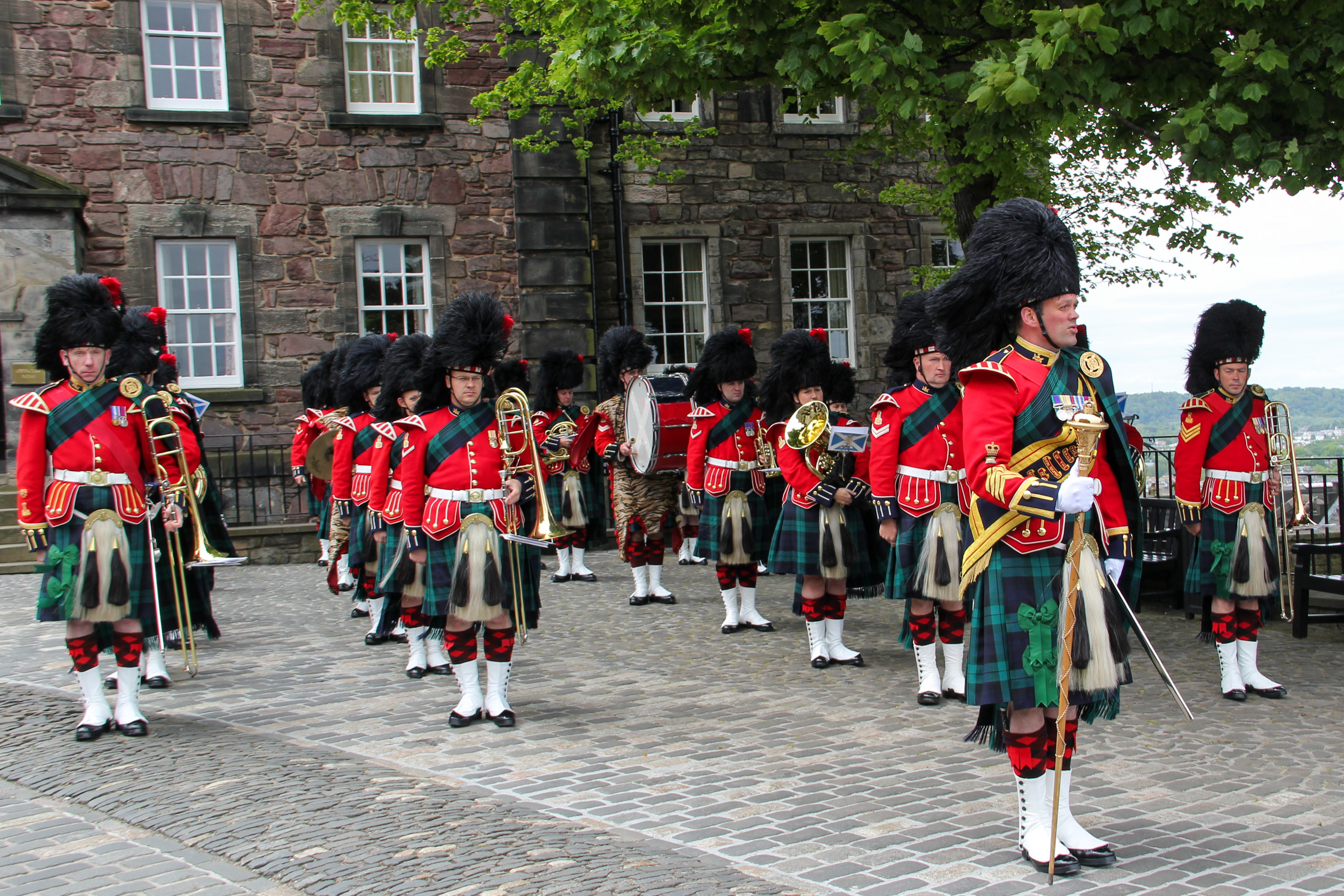
Scottish regiments retain a number of historical elements in their uniform, including their kilts, sporrans, and doublets

With limited exceptions, the unique regimental full dress uniforms disappeared after 1939. Today they are only generally worn, on ceremonial occasions, by the Bands and Corps of Drums, by certain representatives on parade, e.g. some regimental Pioneers, or those forming a guard of honour, and by the regiments of the Household Division. In most regiments they were replaced by a generic dark blue uniform known as No 1 Dress. This dated back to plain "patrol" uniforms worn by officers before 1914 as an informal "undress" uniform.

An early version was worn by some units in the 1937 coronation of King George VI and Queen Elizabeth but had not been made general issue at the time. In the form adopted after World War II, most regiments were distinguished only by coloured piping on the shoulder straps, coloured hat bands, buttons and badges. Scottish regiments retained their kilts or trews and the distinctive doublets, in "piper green" or dark blue, of the full dress scarlet uniform.

Rifles regiments had dark green uniforms and cavalry retained a number of special features such as the crimson trousers of the 11th Hussars or the quartered caps of lancer regiments. A white, lightweight tunic (No 3 Dress) was authorised for use in the tropics, or during the summer months in warmer temperate climates, such as at Bermuda. The blue "home service" helmets were not worn as part of the No 1 dress uniform, except by members of some bands or corps of drums which retained their old full dress uniforms, at regimental expense. English Rifle regiments were amalgamated into the Royal Green Jackets, which continued to wear a dark green dress uniform, and black buttons and belts. Changes have brought the Royal Green Jackets and The Light Infantry together into a single regiment The Rifles, which continues to wear dark green.

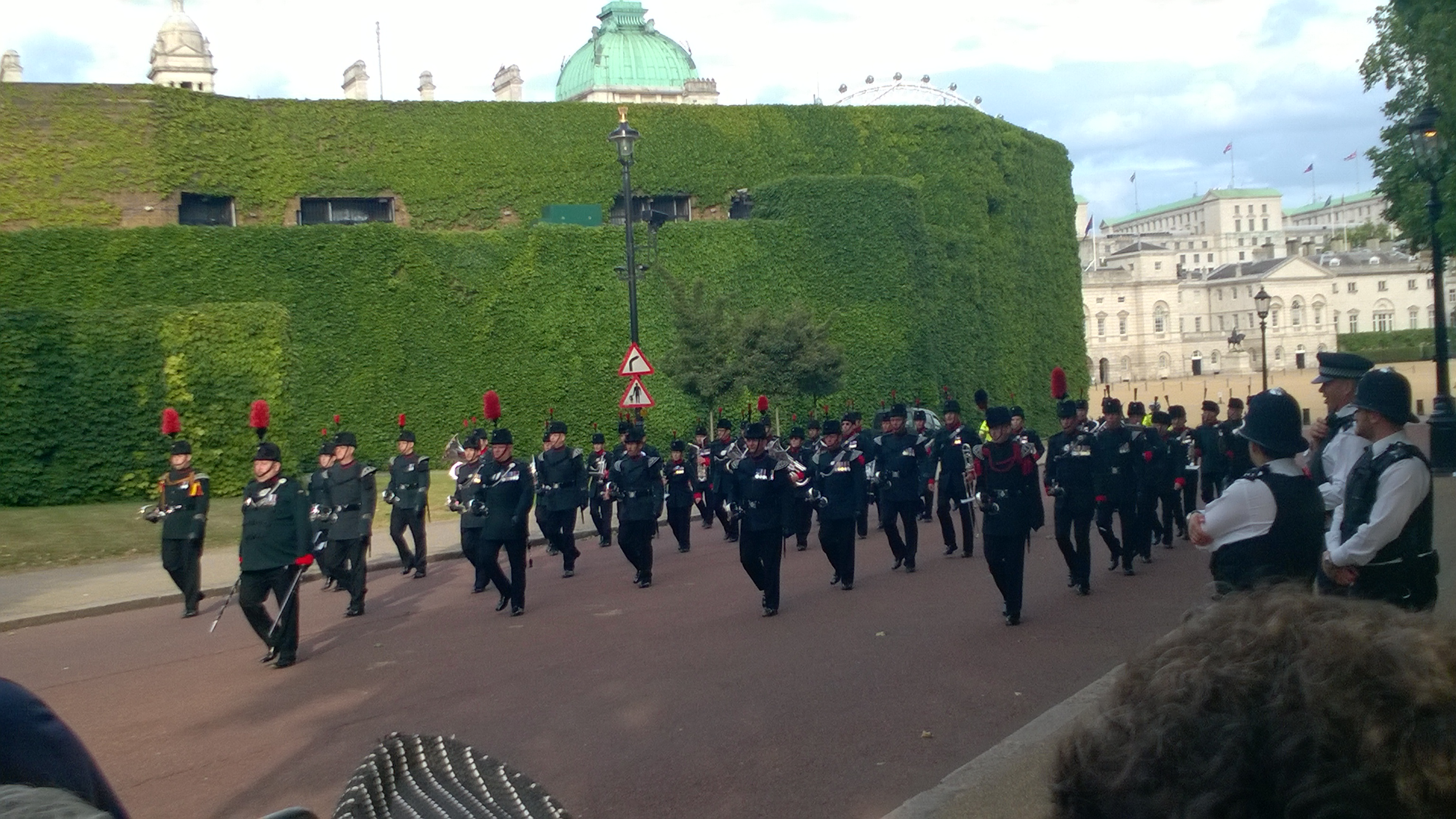
The Waterloo Band of The Rifles in full dress. The Rifles continue to use rifle green in their full dress uniform.

Berets were introduced initially into the Royal Tank Corps in the First World War. Their use became more widespread in the British Army during and after the Second World War, to replace side caps for wear with combat uniforms when protective headgear was not being worn. Khaki was the standard colour for all units, but specialist units adopted coloured berets to distinguish themselves. For example, airborne forces adopted a maroon. This has since been adopted by many other parachute units around the world. The Commandos adopted a green beret.

The Special Air Service (SAS) initially adopted a white beret, quickly changing this to a beige or sand coloured one. From 1944 they wore the Maroon airborne forces beret. The beige beret was re-adopted following the re-formation of the Regular SAS in Malaya. Dark blue berets are worn by units not authorised to use a distinctively coloured beret or other headdress.

A peaked cap, with a coloured hat band, is intended to be worn with the No 1 Dress uniform. Berets are the most common form of headdress seen with other orders of dress and are worn in No1 and 2 dress by some Regiments and Corps.

The blue or green No 1 Dress was not universally adopted after its initial introduction in 1947, khaki No 2 dress being the most usual order of dress for parades and formal occasions. The reason was mainly one of economy, although it was sometimes criticised as being too similar to police and other civilian uniforms.

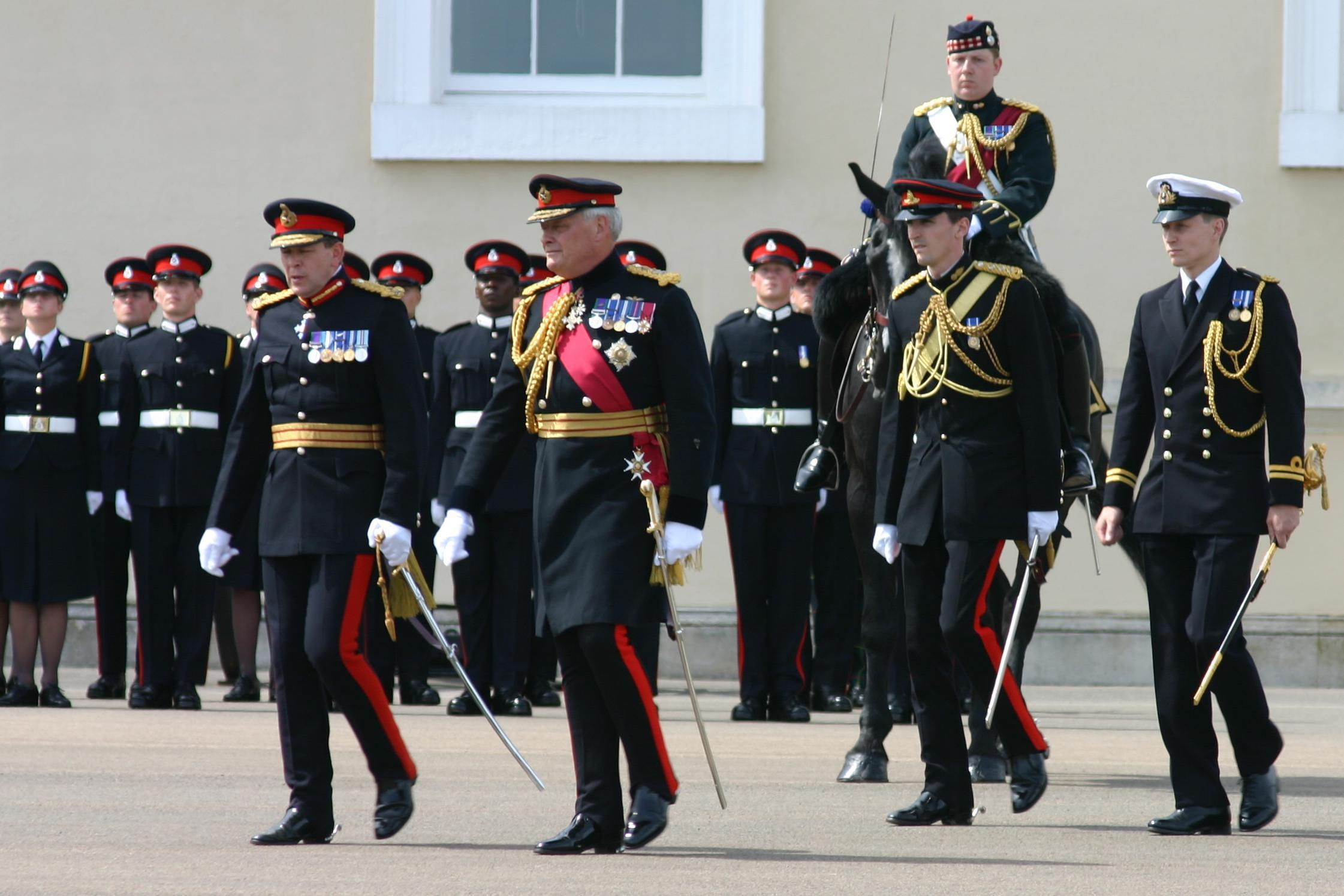
Officer cadets at the Royal Military Academy Sandhurst in full dress.

The practice of issuing other ranks in line regiments with full sets of both service dress and dress uniforms effectively ended in 1914 and was never completely returned to. Today full dress or No 1 Dress uniforms are only held in limited quantities as common stock, and issued only to detachments for special ceremonial occasions. Practices vary between units. Historic items of uniform are more likely to appear where tradition is particularly strong. As an example, the Royal Military Academy Sandhurst wore scarlet and blue "review order" uniforms until World War I, substituted khaki service dress for parade from 1919 to 1939 and now holds dark blue No 1 dress uniforms for the use of its cadets. Until 1995, the Royal Military Police retained "blues" for their now disbanded Mounted Troop.

==== Royal Air Force ====
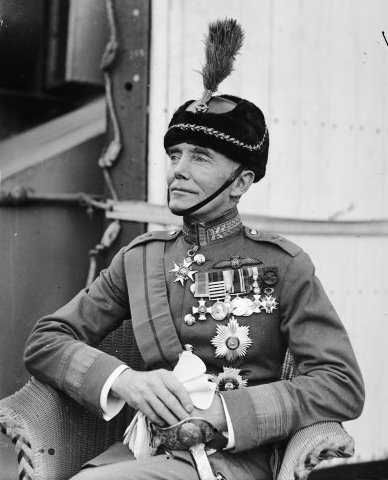
Air Vice-Marshal Philip Game in full dress, c. 1930. At the time, the Royal Air Force's full dress included headgear that resembled helmets used in World War I.

Historically, the Royal Air Force regulations permitted the wearing of a full dress uniform in both home and warm-weather variants. Although the home wear version of full dress is no longer worn, except in a modified form by RAF bandsmen, the tropical full ceremonial dress continues to be authorised.

The temperate full dress uniform was introduced in April 1920. It consisted of a single-breasted jacket in blue-grey with a stand-up collar. Rank was indicated in gold braid on the lower sleeve and white gloves were worn. As with the British Army after 1914, full dress was not general issue during the inter-War period, but was authorized for wear by specific categories such as bandsmen and commissioned officers. Officers generally wore full dress only for infrequent occasions such as attendance at court levees and social functions such as weddings. Military attaches and royal aides de camp were amongst the few serving officers who might have regular occasions to wear full dress.

Initially the full dress uniform was worn with the service dress cap. In 1921, a new form of head-dress was introduced. It was designed to resemble the original flying helmet and it consisted of a leather skull cap trimmed with black rabbit fur. The helmet featured an ostrich feather plume which was connected to an RAF badge. This helmet was never popular and junior officers were eventually permitted to wear the service dress hat on full dress occasions.

Group Captain the Duke of York, later King George VI, wore RAF full dress at his wedding to Lady Elizabeth Bowes-Lyon in 1923. The Duke wore or carried the full dress headgear rather than the service dress cap.

Today the blue-grey full dress uniform is only worn by RAF bandsmen. It is referred to as Number 9 Service Dress.

==== Civilian organisations ====
The formal uniforms used by police forces were until the late 20th century mostly the same as the uniforms worn on ordinary duties, but sometimes with embellishments. The introduction of newer uniforms deliberately designed as workwear has left the older styles mainly used for ceremonial or formal purposes. The general formal style is a black jacket and trousers with a white shirt, and a custodian helmet or peaked cap.

A variation is used by mounted police in Merseyside when they escort the winner of the annual Grand National horse race at Aintree. It consists of the traditional Custodian helmet with an added white plume and silvered chinstrap. Along with the style of tunic it bears a resemblance to a late 19th/early 20th century police uniform.

=== United States ===
==== U.S. Air Force ====
In the mid-1980s, "ceremonial blue" uniform and "ceremonial white" uniform were introduced in the United States Air Force. The ceremonial uniforms were discontinued by 1 August 1994 and 1 March 1993 respectively. The United States Air Force Honor Guard are authorized to wear a ceremonial variant of the Air Force's service uniform.

==== U.S. Army ====
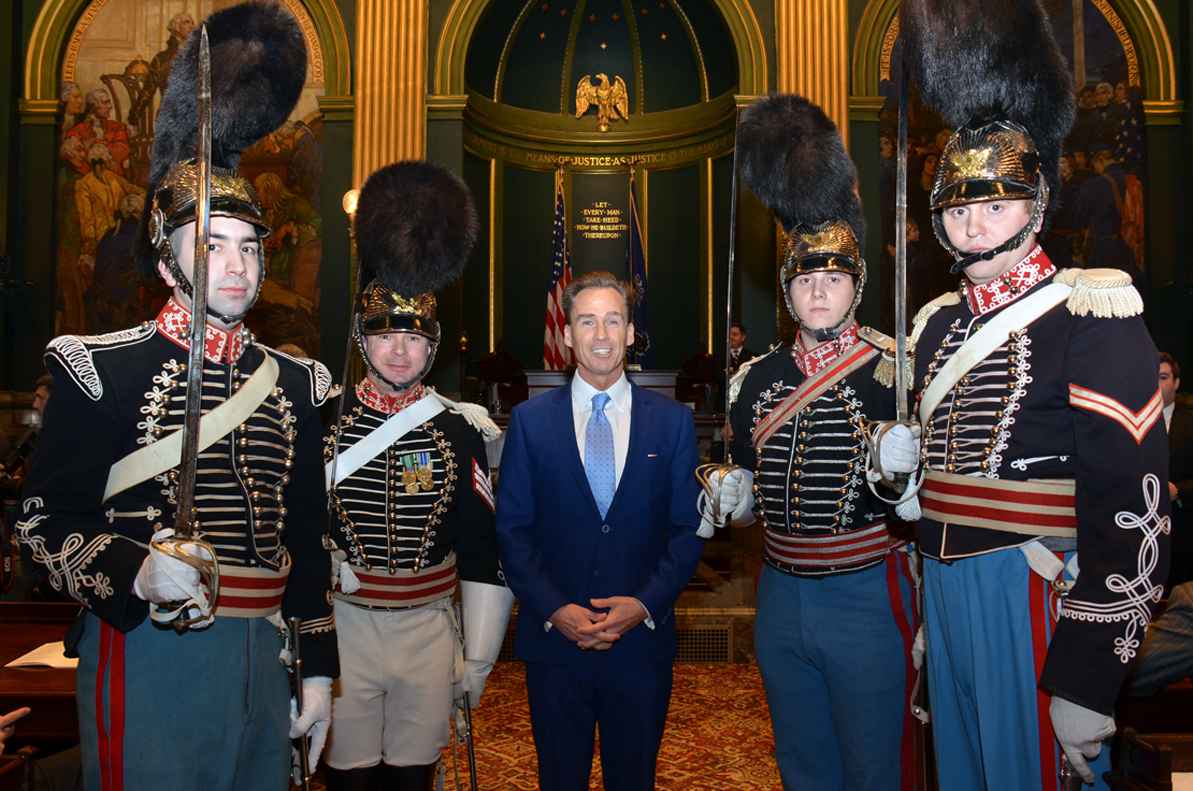
Members of the First Troop Philadelphia City Cavalry in ceremonial dress uniform.

Prior to the 20th century, the uniforms of the United States Army were primarily made out of a combination of dark blue wool (for tunics or coats) and light blue (for trousers and breeches). After the adoption of olive drab and khaki uniforms in 1902, the US Army retained blue uniforms as its full dress until 1917. A modernised and simplified blue dress uniform was introduced in 1937.

The blue full dress ceremonial overcoat was reintroduced in January 1929. It saw alterations to its design in 1936 and 1937, before it was suspended from use in 1943. The overcoat was reauthorized for use by officers in 1947, although it seldom sees use. The ceremonial overcoat with a white scarf is presently listed as an optional purchase item in the Army's uniform regulations, with general officers, aides-de-camp, and command sergeants major being authorized to wear it in formal ceremonial occasions during cold-weather conditions.

In 1956, the Army introduced a blue service dress uniform, based on the full dress blue uniform. Presently, the Class A Army Service Uniform serves as the U.S. Army's equivalent to full dress. In November 2018, the U.S. Army announced the dress blue service uniform would be replaced by Army Green service uniforms. The U.S. Army intends to maintain the dress blue uniforms for ceremonial use.

The U.S. Army's uniform regulations also define a class of "special ceremonial units," that are authorized to wear distinct ceremonial regimental uniforms for ceremonies and public duties. They include select U.S. Army band and guard units, including the 3rd Infantry Regiment's Commander-in-Chief's Guard, the First Troop Philadelphia City Cavalry, and some National Guard. Cadets at the United States Military Academy wear a cadet grey swallow-tailed blouse with white trousers and black shako for parades and drills.

==== U.S. Marine Corps ====
The most formal of a Marine's uniforms outside of the elaborate evening dress uniforms of officers and senior enlisted, it is often referred to as "Dress Blues", due to its color, as distinguished from the green and khaki service uniforms, and can be worn in many forms. It is the only uniform of the United States military to use all of the colors of the US flag and incorporates button designs which are the oldest military insignia still in use in the United States Armed Forces to this day.

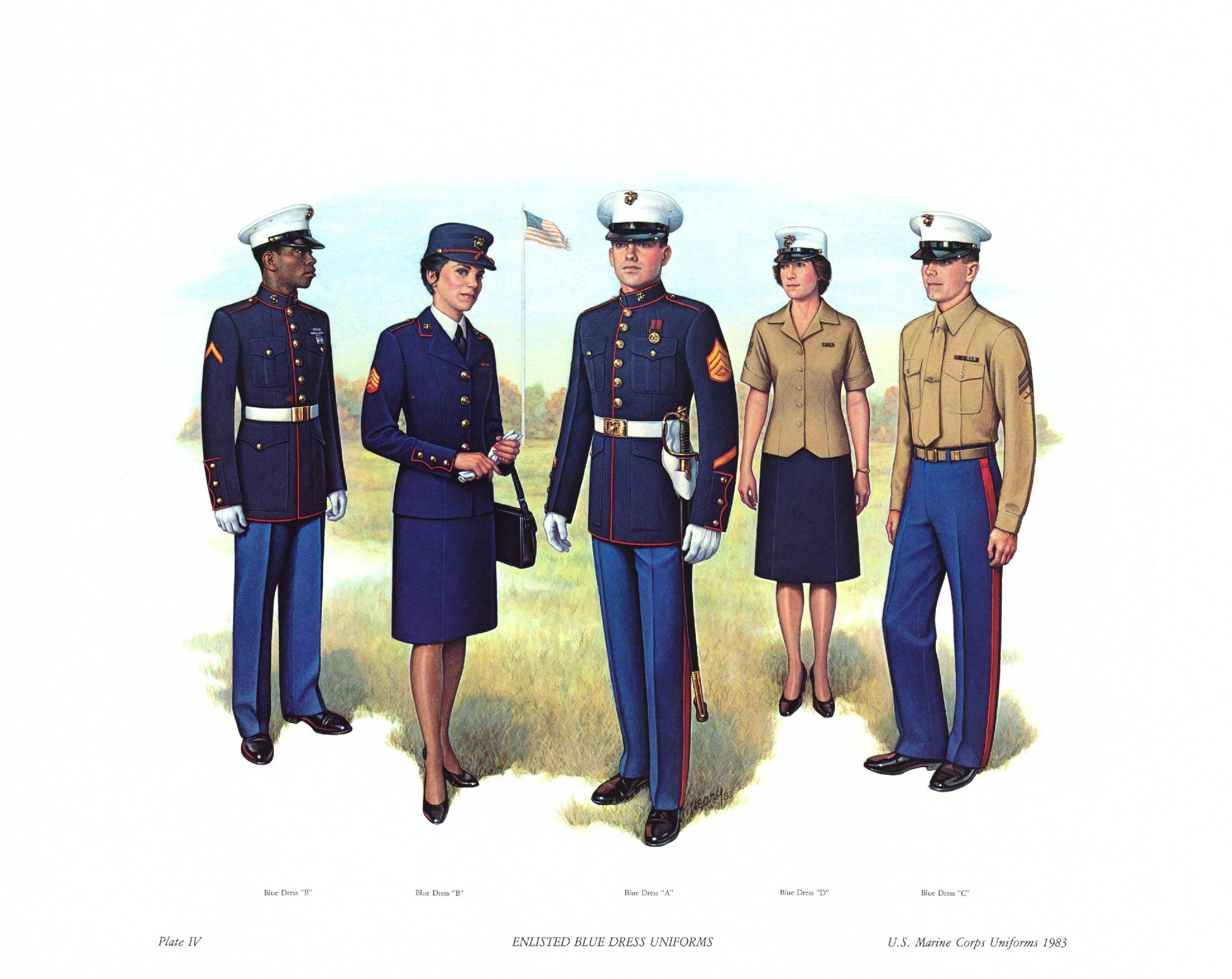
Enlisted marines dressed in Blue Dress Uniforms. From left to right: "B", "B", "A", "D", and "C".

The various designations used in Dress Blue include:

- Dress Blue "A" has a long sleeve choker-collar midnight blue outer blouse, white barracks cover, with all medals and service ribbons. Enlisted coats have a red trim and more buttons down the middle of the coat than officers.
- Dress Blue "B" is the same as "A", but service ribbons and marksmanship badges are worn instead of medals. Dress Blue "A" (with medals worn) is strictly reserved for official ceremonies, while Dress Blue "B" may be worn on leave or liberty.
- Dress Blue "C" is the dress blue uniform worn with the long sleeve khaki shirt (without coat). Service ribbons and badges may be worn.
- Dress Blue "D" is the dress blue uniform worn with the short sleeve khaki shirt (without coat). Service ribbons and badges may be worn

All the blue uniforms have the same trousers, cover, and black shoes. General officers wear dark blue trousers in the same color as the coat. Officers, staff noncommissioned officers, and non-commissioned officers wear blood stripes on their trousers. Blood stripes are 1 1/4 inches (3.2 cm) in width for NCOs and SNCOs, 1 1/2 inches (3.8 cm) for officers, and 2 inches (5.1 cm) for general officers.

A sword may be worn when the individual is in command of troops in formation—the Mameluke sword for officers, the NCO sword for NCOs and SNCOs. When wearing the sword and Dress Blue coat, officers wear the Sam Browne belt. For enlisted, the sword is worn with a white waistbelt and brass buckle when wearing the Dress Blue coat. The Marine Corps is the only branch of the United States military which regularly allows NCOs to carry a sword. For enlisted marines, they earn the right to carry the NCO sword and wear the scarlet blood stripe on their blue trousers when they achieve the rank of corporal.

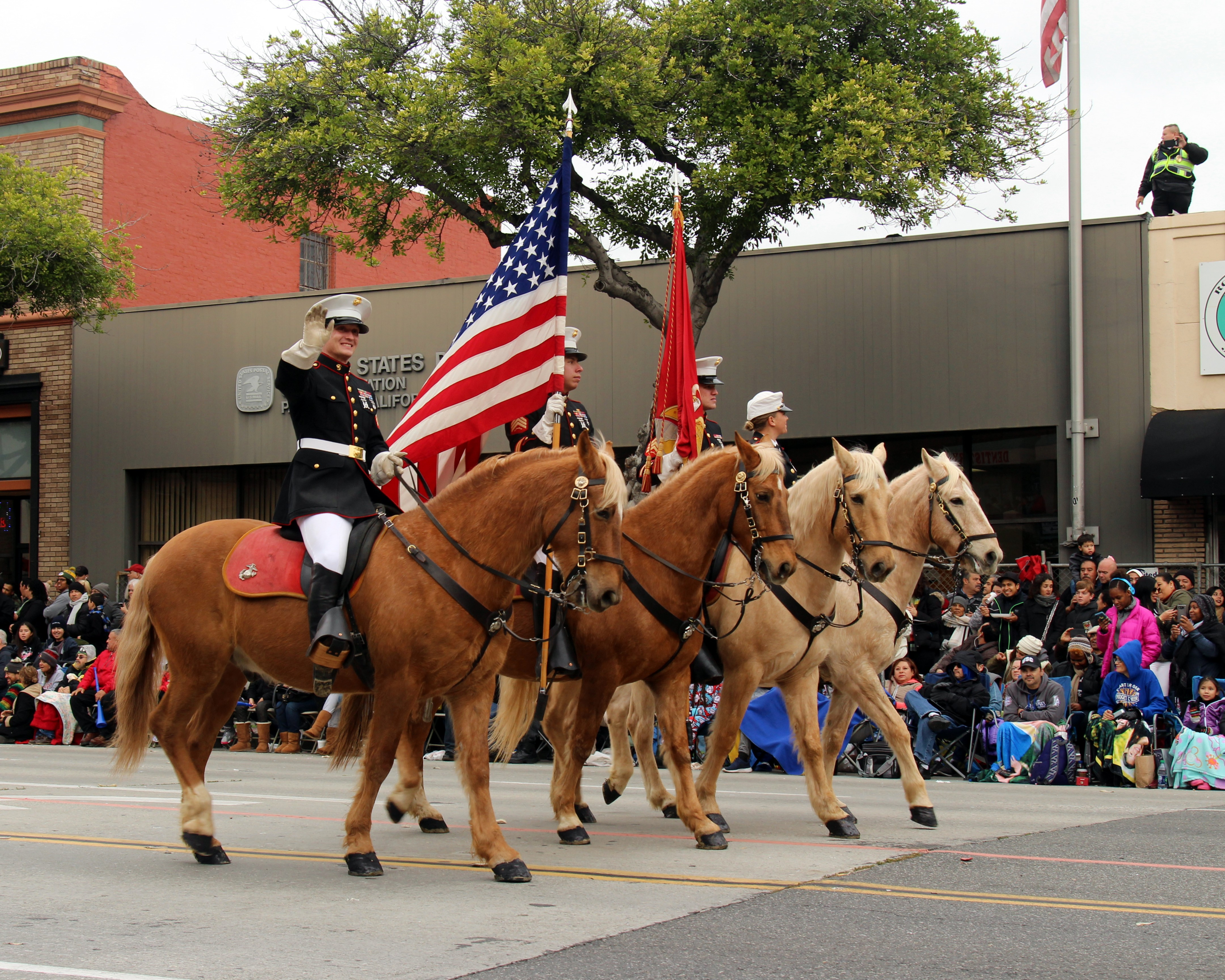
Dress uniform for the Marine Corps Mounted Color Guard consists of a blue dress coat, white breeches, and polished knee-high boots.

Members of the United States Marine Corps Band, and the United States Marine Drum and Bugle Corps are authorized different dress uniforms, known as Red-Dress, which is a scarlet blouse with a blue trim. Before 1998, certain ceremonial Marine units, such as the Silent Drill Platoon, wore a blue/white dress uniform in which white trousers were substituted for blue while performing ceremonial functions. The blue/white version is now an authorized summer uniform for officers, SNCOs, and on certain functions, NCOs. The Marine Corps Mounted Color Guard wears the blue dress coat with white riding breeches and polished black knee-high riding boots. In the past, they have worn blue riding breeches with the red blood stripe.

Another uniform, the obsolete Dress White uniform, was a white version of the standard dress coat and trousers, was authorized only for officers and SNCOs. It resembled the Navy's officer/CPO dress whites. No blood stripes were authorized, and white shoes were worn. This uniform was superseded by the Blue/White Dress uniform in 2000.

==== U.S. Navy ====
The Dress White uniform consists of a stand-collar white tunic, white trousers, and white dress shoes. Rank for officers is displayed on shoulder marks for males and on the sleeve cuffs for females, while CPO rank insignia is worn on the collar for both sexes. Service dress white includes service ribbons, whereas full dress white includes service ribbons and medals. This uniform is informally called "Chokers", due to the stand-collar.

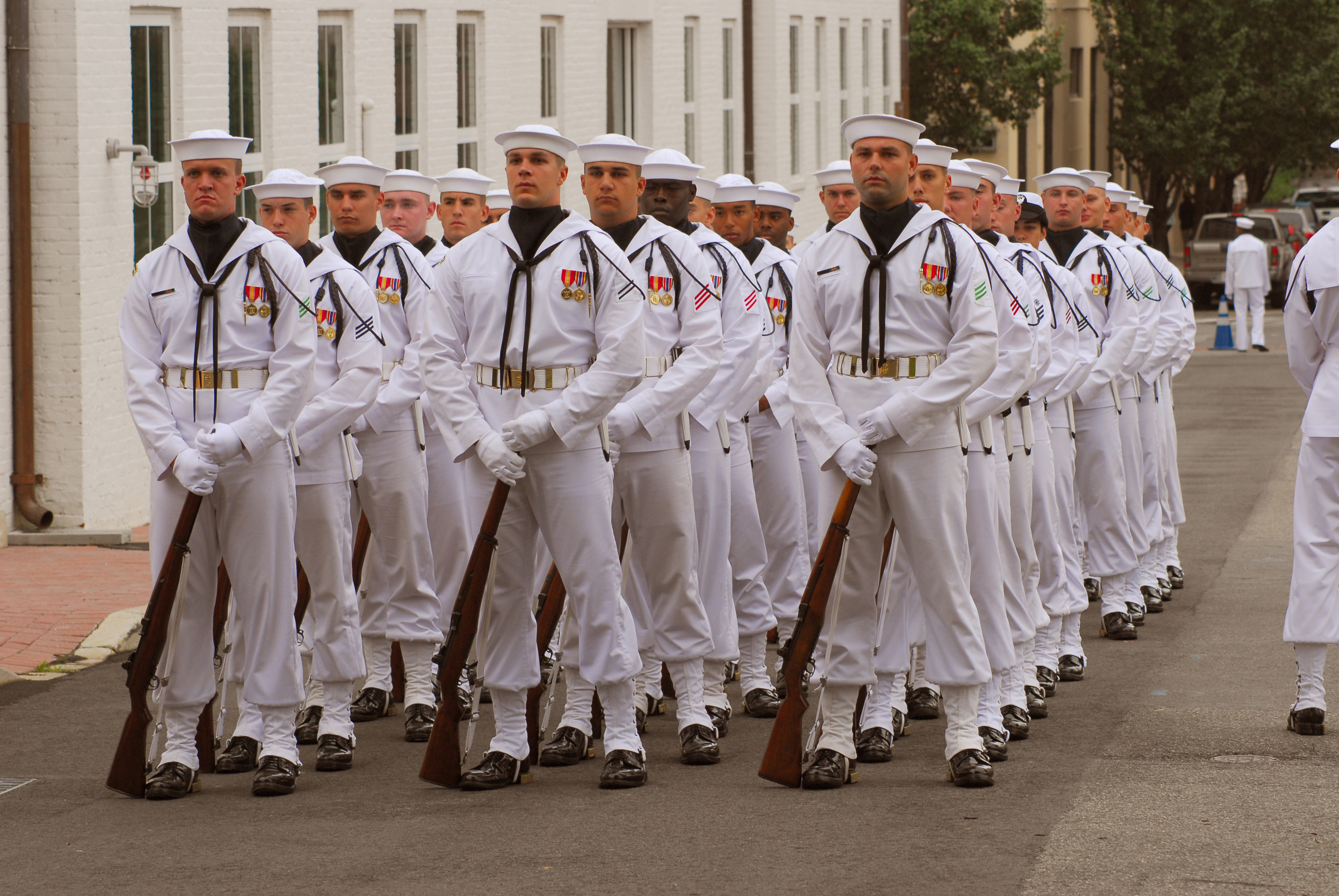
Enlisted sailors of the United States Navy in Full Dress Whites during a retirement ceremony.

The Dress Blue uniform consists of black shoes, navy blue (black in appearance) coat and trousers, a white shirt and either a Windsor or formal bowtie. Only service ribbons are worn with Service Dress Blue. Service ribbons and medals are worn with Full Dress Blue. Depending on the occasion, officers may also wear swords with either Full Dress White or Blue. Both the white and blue uniforms are worn with the distinctive peaked cap with white cover.

Naval enlisted personnel ranked Petty Officer First Class, E-6, and below have seasonal uniforms. The dress white and blue uniforms are of the traditional "sailor suit" or crackerjack type. It consists of a pullover shirt, called a jumper, with a V-neck going to a square collar flap, a black neckerchief, and bell-bottomed trousers. The white uniform is worn with a white belt and silver buckle. The blue uniform features thirteen decorative buttons.

==== U.S. Coast Guard ====
Before 1972, U.S. Coast Guard personnel generally wore the same uniforms as the U.S. Navy but with distinctive Coast Guard insignia, primarily distinctive cap devices for officers and chief petty officers, incorporation of the Coast Guard shield in lieu of line or staff corps insignia for officers, and differentiated uniform buttons on dress uniforms.

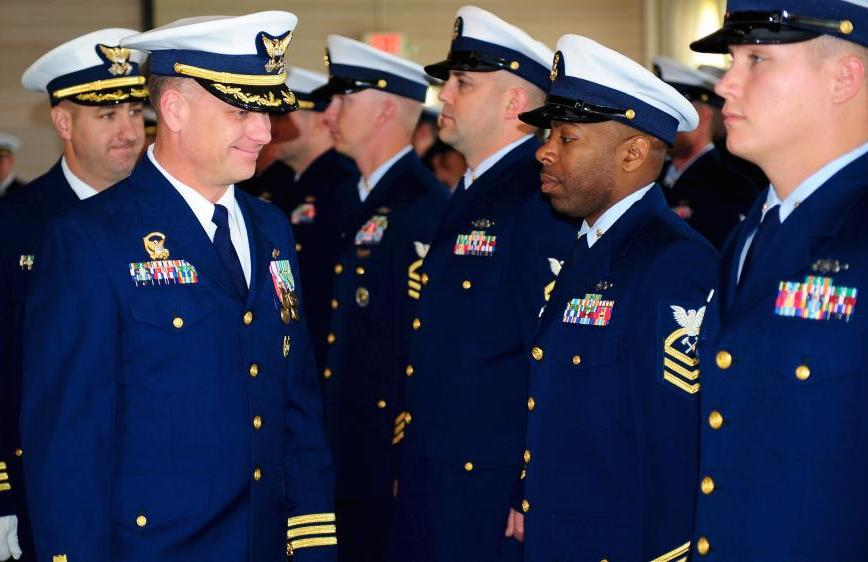
Members of the United States Coast Guard in Full Dress Blue during a change of command ceremony at Coast Guard Base Kodiak.

Presently, the U.S. Coast Guard maintains two full dress uniforms, full dress blue, and full dress white. Full dress blue is worn during change of command ceremonies, parades, and reviews when special honours are being paid, including state visits. The full dress blue uniforms are similar to the U.S. Coast Guard's service dress blue "A", except that it is worn with a full-size medals instead of ribbons. A sword may be prescribed for officers, and a white belt and glove may be required.

Full Dress White is worn for similar occasions by officers of the U.S. Coast Guard during the summer, or when in tropical environments. Men wear a high stand-collared white tunic, white trousers, and white shoes. Women wear a uniform similar to the dress blue uniform but with a white coat and skirt or trousers. Both genders wear shoulder boards rather than sleeve stripes, and medals, combination cover, and sword. The uniform is nearly identical to the U.S. Navy's Full Dress Whites, but the buttons and combination cover device are Coast Guard specific.

The United States Coast Guard Academy maintains two different styles of parade dress uniforms. Both variants include a black blouse, with banded collars and double row of buttons, and a white peaked hat. Full Dress Blue A, uses white trousers. Full Dress Blue B uses black trousers.

=== Venezuela ===
Within the National Bolivarian Armed Forces of Venezuela dress uniforms are commonplace within its services.

The Presidential Honor Guard Brigade wears dress uniforms similar to those used by the Hussar troop raised by Simon Bolivar in 1816. It is of a red tunic with gold buttons and black pants, belt and a black (formerly brown) busby hat, plus epaulettes worn by officers. The Caracas Battalion of the Ministry of Defence wears a light blue uniform with white buttons, black pants, a belt, boots or black shoes and the red beret while the Daniel O'Leary Battalion of the Army Headquarters wears an identical uniform but with the dark blue beret.

The Military Academy of the Bolivarian Army wears a 19th-century-styled Prussian bright blue uniform as the full dress of the Corps of Cadets, with a pickelhaube or peaked cap depending on the year level. The former is worn by all officers and the senior and junior year cadets.

== Full dress uniform by international organisations ==
=== St John Ambulance ===
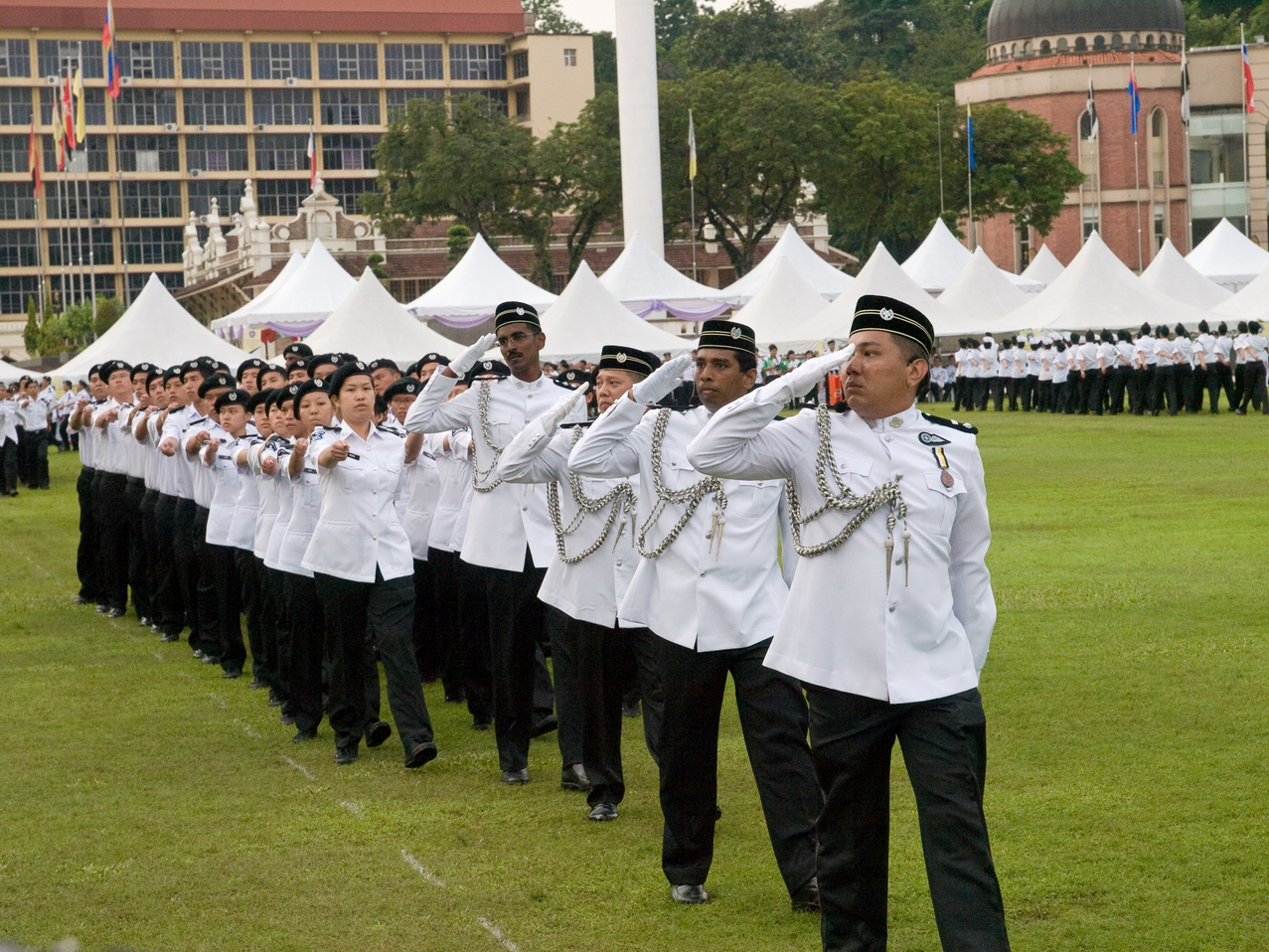
Individuals leading a group of St John Ambulance of Malaysia (SJAM) volunteers wearing SJAM's ceremonial uniform.

St John Ambulance is a volunteer group of affiliated organisations in 42 countries, which aims to teach and provide first aid, and emergency medical services. The organisation uses a number of uniforms, including a ceremonial one. The affiliated national organisations do not share a standardized ceremonial uniform, known as formal uniform or dress uniform depending on the country.

The uniform of St John Ambulance in Canada, England, Ireland, and Wales was derived from the uniforms of London's Metropolitan Police Service; using similar jackets and trousers with different buttons, badges, and a cap with a white band and belt-mounted items relevant to first-aid work. Conversely, the ceremonial uniform for St John Ambulance in Malaysia, and St John Singapore uses a white tunic and black trousers; derived from the British Army's warm weather ceremonial uniform. Generally, the organisation's ceremonial uniform is not used for daily medical and first-aid work, with the various national St John Ambulance organisations issuing a variety of occupational uniforms.

== See also ==
- Military uniform
  - Mess dress uniform
  - Service dress uniform
  - Combat uniform
- Formal wear
  - Morning dress
  - White tie
  - Ceremonial dress
  - Religious clothing
  - Folk costume
