= Knit tie =

Necktie made from knitted fabric

A knit tie, or knitted tie, is a type of necktie made from knitted fabric. It most often worn with a dress shirt or casual collar shirt, and be worn with casual or business casual dress. A knit tie can also be worn in circumstances where a casual collar shirt, jeans and sport coat are acceptable for men. Knit ties, particularly in black, were popularized on college campuses in the 1960s as part of Ivy Style.
