= Workwear =

Clothing worn for a profession

Workwear is clothing worn for work, especially work that involves manual labour. Often those employed within trade industries elect to be outfitted in workwear because it is built to provide durability and safety.

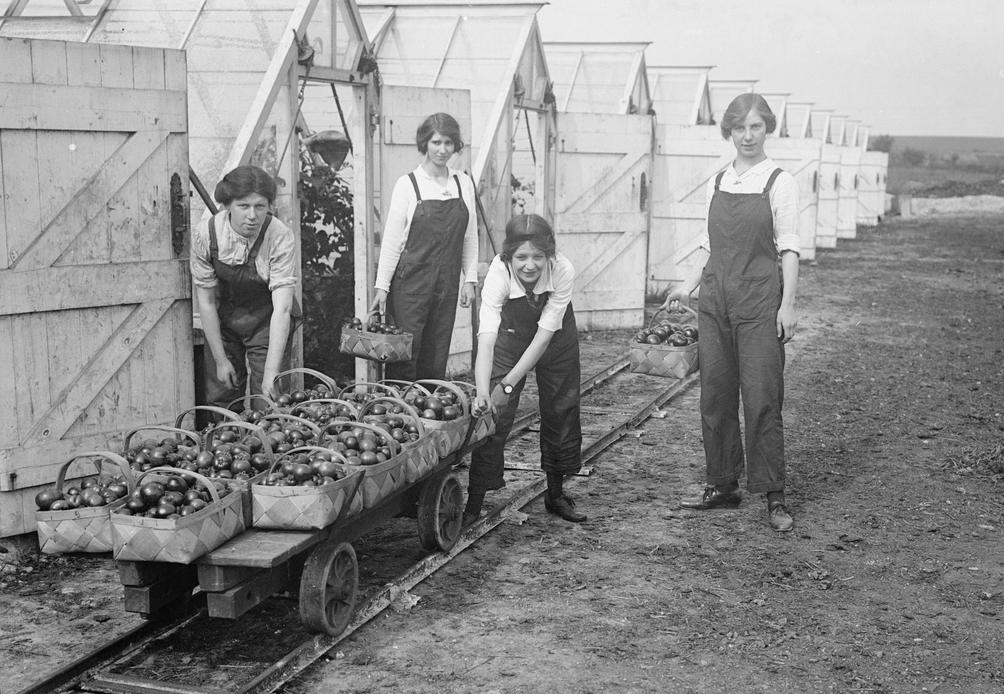
Agricultural workers wearing bib overalls during World War I

The workwear clothing industry is growing and consumers have numerous retailers to choose from. Chains that have made a commitment to the $1 billion and rising workwear business report steady 6 percent to 8 percent annual gains in men's workwear.

In the United Kingdom, if workwear is provided to an employee without a logo, it may be subject to income tax being levied on the employee for a "payment in kind". However, if company clothing is provided with logos on then the employee may be entitled to a tax rebate to help pay for the upkeep.

== History ==
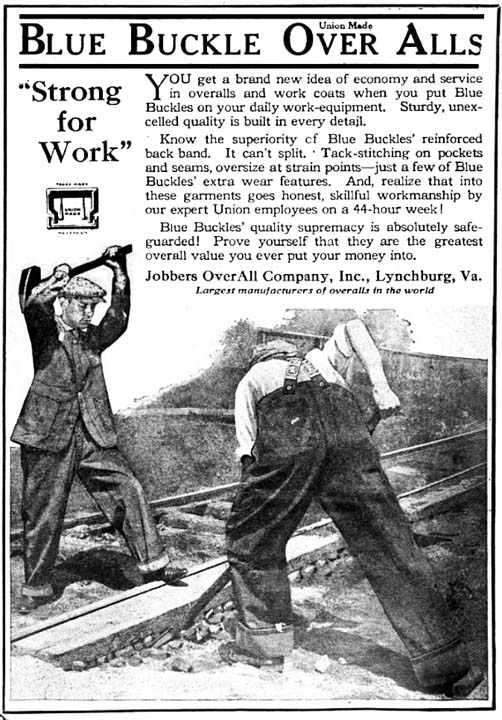
Advertisement for overalls, 1920

In Britain from the mid 19th century until the 1970s, dustmen, coalmen, and the manual laborers known as navvies wore flat caps, corduroy pants, heavy boots, and donkey jackets, often with a brightly colored cotton neckerchief to soak up the sweat. Later versions of the donkey jacket came with leather shoulder patches to prevent wear when shouldering a spade or pick. Mill workers in Yorkshire and Lancashire wore a variant of this basic outfit with English clogs. The cuffs of the pants were frequently secured with string, and grandad shirts were worn without a collar to decrease the likelihood of being caught in the steam powered machinery.

By the early Victorian era, a working class man's occupation could be identified through his attire. Millers, bakers and cooks wore white clothing due to the importance of food hygiene, knife makers, blacksmiths and shoemakers wore heavy duty leather aprons, butchers and fishmongers wore straw hats and red or blue striped aprons, and cab drivers wore top hats and caped greatcoats as protection from the rain. Costermongers wore one of the most distinctive outfits, comprising a flat cap, well polished boots, a silk scarf known as a kingsman, and blue corduroy trousers and waistcoat with gold huntsman buttons (i.e. buttons with a hunting motif). The tradition of the pearly king emerged during the late 19th century when a young street sweeper named Henry Croft imitated the costermongers' clothing by stitching mother of pearl buttons to the seams of his jacket and trousers.

=== Asian workwear ===
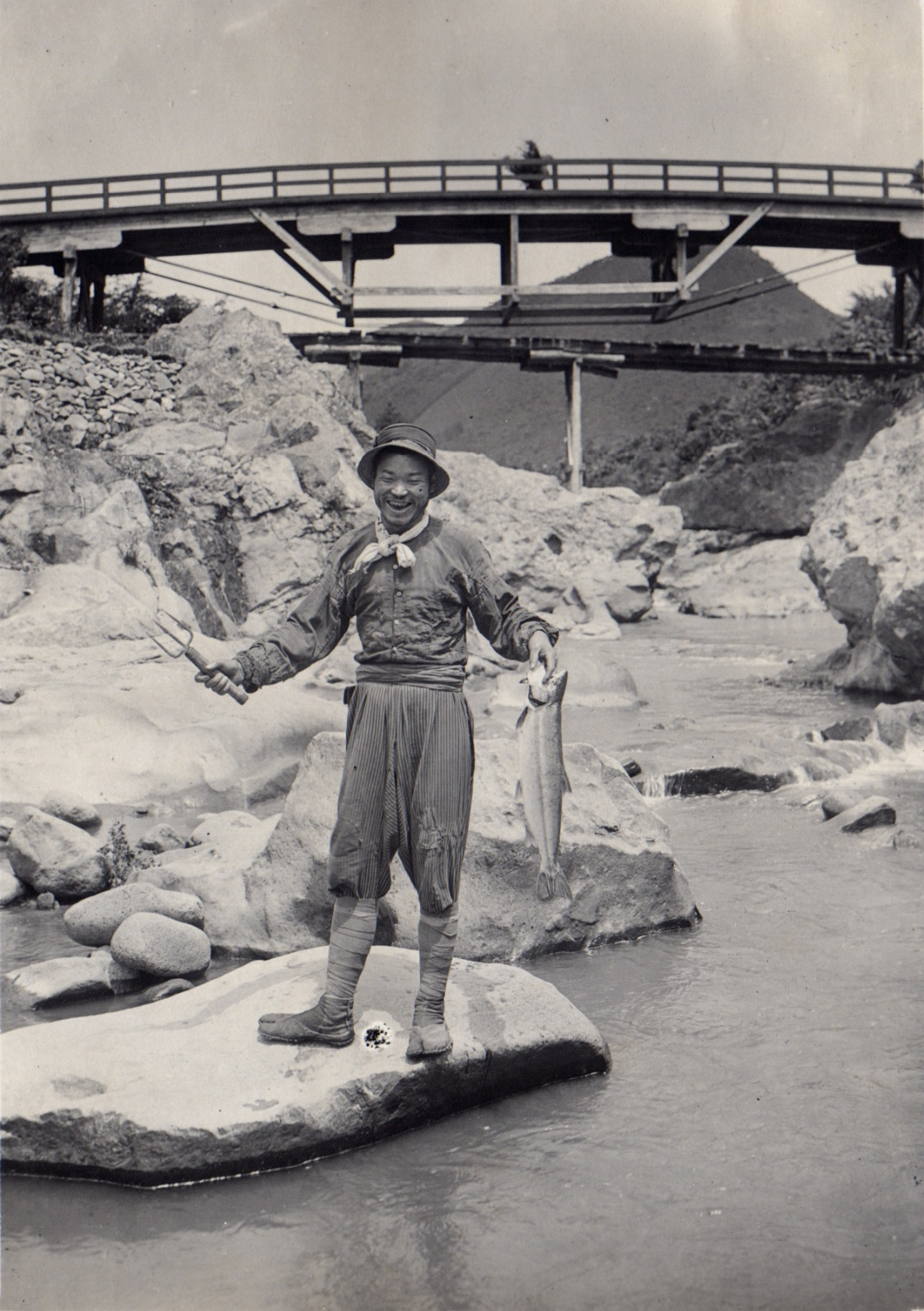
Tabi boots and Nikkapokka pants worn by Japanese fisherman, 1915

In Japan, workwear developed during the early 20th century from a synthesis of Japanese and European clothing. Tobishoku, Japanese high rise construction workers would wear jika-tabi boots with Nikkapokka pants which emerged from Dutch knickerbockers and Japanese design. They were often stitched using Sashiko, a garment mending technique originally made by Japanese farmers and fishermen to repair damaged garments. During the Pacific War tabi boots were issued to Japanese soldiers to facilitate tree climbing.

Modern Chinese workwear was developed from the five button Zhongshan suit popularized by Sun Yat-Sen and Mao Zedong. This was derived from fatigue blouses issued to the prewar German, British and Russian armies in addition to the blue denim chore jackets and shackets worn by French factory workers. Under Communism the Mao jacket became mandatory for all sections of society and was made in blue for the workers, grey or tan for CCP members, black for policemen, white for naval officers, and green for the military. High ranking party members were entitled to four rather than two external pockets. In cold weather, a padded two-piece outfit based on the Russian telogreika was worn by peasants and construction workers.

=== Maritime workwear ===
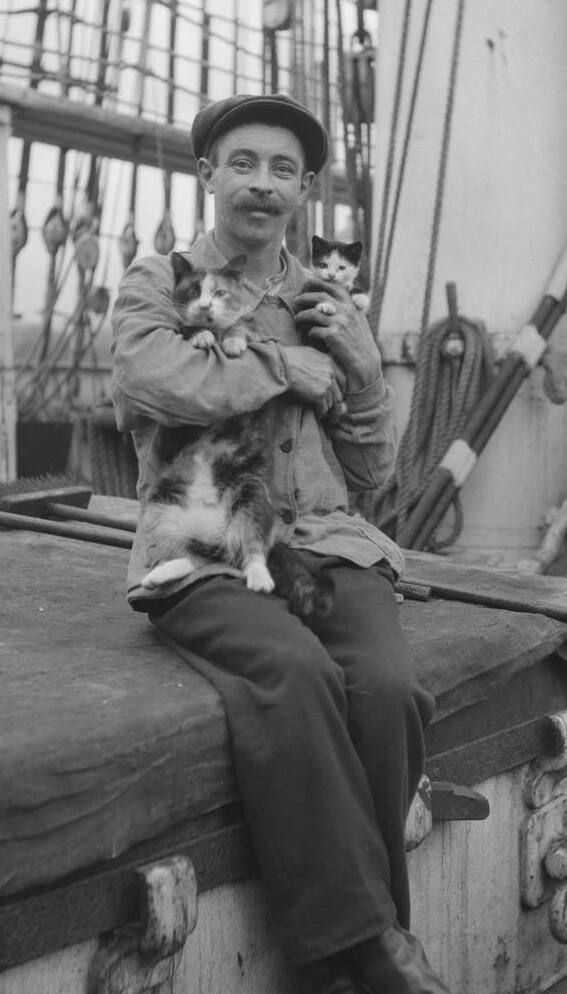
Australian sailor wearing bell bottoms, ca. 1910

Since the late 18th century, merchant seamen and dockworkers have worn denim flared trousers, striped undershirts, knitted roll neck jumpers, and short blue peacoats. This basic outfit, paired with a thick leather belt, flat cap and clogs, was also a mark of identification for turn of the century criminal gangs such as the Scuttlers. On the more luxurious cruise ships and ocean liners, deckhands wore neatly pressed dress blues similar to those of the Royal Navy and USN, while waiters and cabin stewards wore white uniforms with a band collar, gilded brass buttons, and a gold stripe on the trouser leg.

In wet weather, historically sailors wore oilskins, Souwesters, and dreadnoughts. Contemporary fishermen in poor weather generally wear a two-piece yellow or orange waterproof jacket and trousers. Modern updates to the traditional look include polar fleeces, hoodies, baseball caps, and knit caps. In Europe, the most common workwear onboard vessels is a boilersuit.

Straw hats, sailor caps and tarred waterproof hats are no longer in widespread civilian use, but wool or denim versions of the Greek fisherman's cap remain common.

=== Equestrian workwear ===
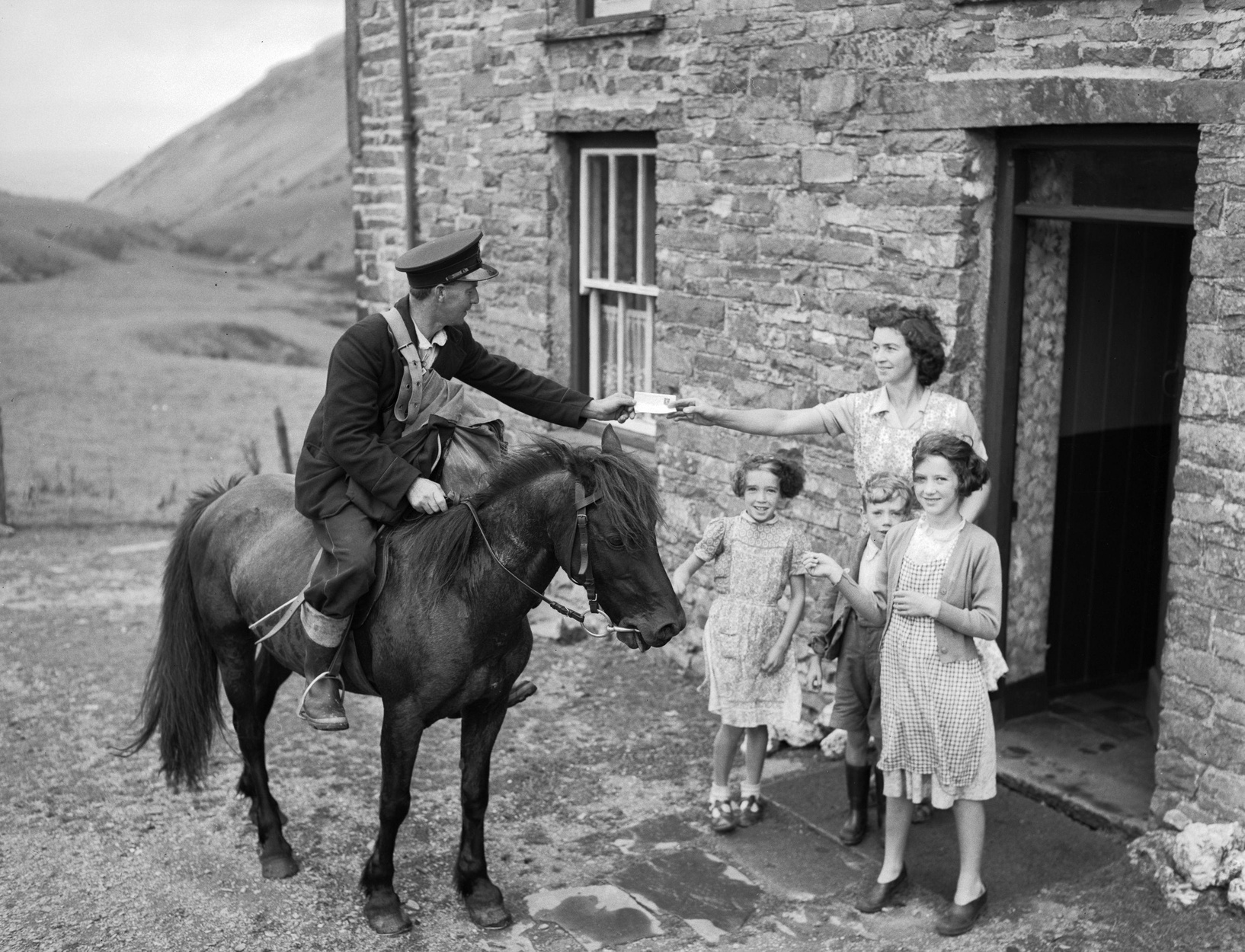
Welsh postman, 1955

Before 1900, the haulage industry relied on horse-drawn transportation in rural areas not served by a train station. In the Old West, stage coach drivers, wagon teamsters and pony express riders wore linen duster coats, tall boots and slouch hats as protection from the dust and sun. The attire of the working cowboy, copied from Mexican vaquero clothing, included blue jeans, cowboy boots with high heels, a bandana, a stetson hat, and a checked western shirt with pearl snaps.

British postmen, so-called because they originally rode postilion on the horses of the mail coaches that collected letters from staging posts, wore a blue coat and scarlet waistcoat to identify them as employees of the British crown. As of 2025, Royal Mail continues this tradition by issuing red jackets and polo shirts to their employees. The first safety boots, reinforced with iron plates, were introduced around 1600 to protect the postman's legs from the heavy draw bar of the mail coach. Originally, top hats were worn but by the 1850s these had been replaced with peaked caps or kepis which were less likely to be knocked off by low-hanging tree branches. Although post horses had largely been superseded by bicycles by the 1890s, postmen continued to deliver the mail on horseback to remote addresses until the 1950s. Although most postal services wear blue, American USPS mailmen have worn grey military pattern ike jackets since the 1940s and Polish postal workers wore a maciejowka cap and brown uniform derived from those used by the Austro-Hungarian Empire before blue uniforms were introduced under communism. In colder countries like Germany, Norway or Finland, postmen wear ski caps with a turn-down flap to protect the ears and face, while mail carriers in Australia, South Africa and the Southern US are issued shorts and pith helmets due to the tropical climate.

=== Railroad use ===
In the Old West era, Union Pacific train engineers and railroad workers wore distinctive overalls, caps and work jackets made from hickory stripe before boiler suits were invented in the early 20th century. Railway conductors, porters and station masters wore more formal blue uniforms based on the three piece lounge suit, with brass buttons and a military surplus kepi from the Civil War era. In modern times, the striped engineer cap remains part of the uniform of American train drivers.

== Modern era ==
=== Logging industry ===
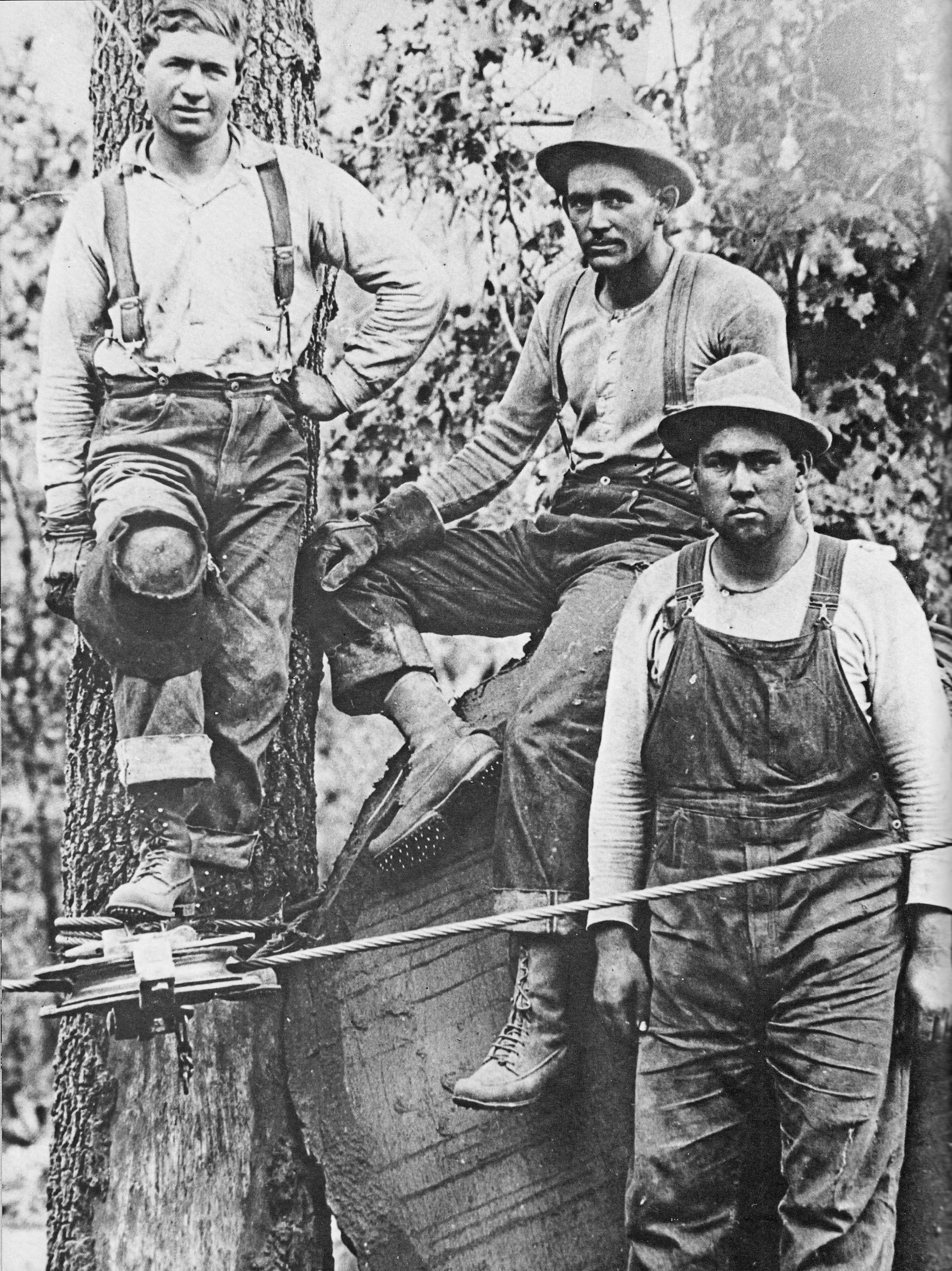
Sugar Pine lumberjacks in loose fitting, stagged-off pants, suspenders, long-johns, felt hats and caulk boots.

Since the days of the Old West, American and Canadian lumberjacks have worn buffalo plaid Pendleton jackets, wool tuques, trapper hats, tall waterproof boots with a reinforced toecap, and chaps as protection from the chainsaw. Olive drab versions of the padded wool jacket were issued to US Army jeep crews during the war, and plaid Pendletons became popular casual wear in America during the 1950s.

=== Use by truckers ===
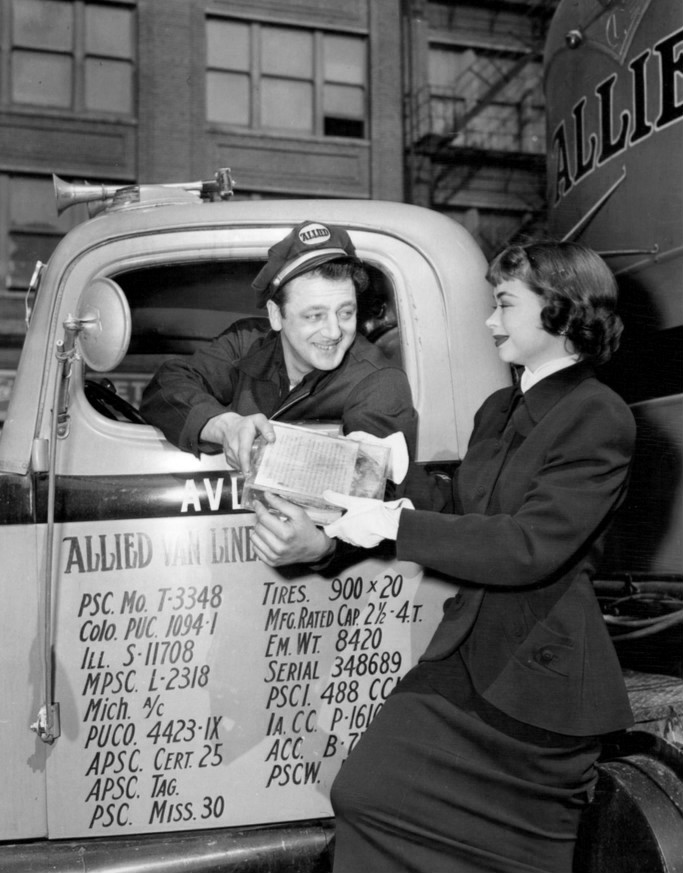
Truck driver wearing mechanic's cap, 1949.

From the 1930s onwards, truckers and mechanics wore a distinctive outfit comprising mechanic's cap, white T-shirt, bandana, boiler suit, checked shirt, leather coat, Pendleton jacket, double denim jacket, and blue jeans. The skipper cap in particular signified the truckers' link with the big seaports, from which imported goods were transported all over the country. This look served as the inspiration for the ton-up boy, raggare, and greaser subculture during the 1950s and 1960s. By the early 1980s, the peaked caps had been replaced with foam and mesh baseball caps known as trucker hats or gimme caps, which were originally given to truck drivers by manufacturers such as John Deere, Mountain Dew or Budweiser to advertise their products.

=== 1990s to 2020s ===
In the present day, industrial and service industry workwear typically comprises T-shirts or polo shirts that are cheap to replace, black or navy polyester and cotton blend pants, steel capped boots, and for cashiers at large department stores like Wal-Mart or Aldi, a colored waistcoat or tabard bearing the company logo. Zip up Polar fleeces, originally invented during the 1970s for use by meat packing plant workers in the large refrigerated units, are also commonly worn by factory workers, barrow boys and stock handlers in colder climates.

== Inspiration in fashion ==
During the 1980s, workwear such as the donkey jacket and Doc Martens safety boots were popular street attire for British skinheads, suedeheads, hardcore punks and football hooligans. More recently, Celtic punk groups such as Dropkick Murphys have adopted aspects of the look such as the flat cap to assert their working class Irish-American identity.

In the 21st century, the style has also made a huge impact on the fashion industry, including segments such as streetwear. Workwear has not just become a style of clothes that has been adopted by the hipster subculture, but a culture and way of life in this particular community. Pompadour hair cuts, tattoos, denim jackets, military trench coats, lumberjack flannels, chambray shirts, raw denim, and work boots take part into this workwear style.

== See also ==
- Personal protective equipment
- Dress code
- Western dress codes
  - Casual wear
    - Business casual
    - Smart casual
    - Casual Friday
    - Sportswear
