= Informal wear =

Western dress code suited for office use

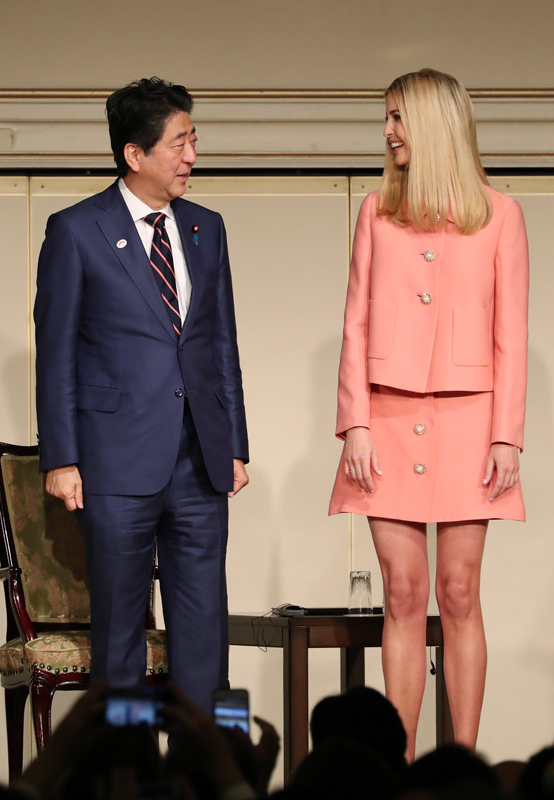
Shinzo Abe and Ivanka Trump, both wearing Western business suits (2017)

Informal wear, business formal or undress, also called business wear, corporate/office wear, tenue de ville or dress clothes, is a Western dress code for clothing defined by a business suit for men, and cocktail dress or trouser suit for women. On the scale of formality, it is considered less formal than evening gowns, dinner jackets and black lounge suits but more formal than casual wear. Informal or undress should not be confused with casual wear such as business casual or smart casual; most situations calling for "informal wear" will usually tolerate casual dress to varying extents.

The suit originated as leisure wear in the late 19th century but eventually replaced the frock coat as everyday wear in the city. After World War I, the suit was established as informal daily wear. Hats, such as trilbies or bowler hats, are sometimes worn with informal wear.

Informal wear is commonly worn for office use in professions such as politics, academia, law, finance and business, as well as to certain events such as job interviews in other sectors. It is a traditional dress code that aims to indicate respect to the situation and not draw attention.

== History ==
The suit originated in Britain in the 19th-century as a leisurewear. Seeking a casual alternative to the knee-length, heavy frock coats then considered appropriate business dress, men began to wear lighter coats cut just below the seat when not engaged in business.

Standard suit-making fabric is fine combed wool, with the inclusion of cashmere in more expensive fabrics. Middle-price suits are often made of wool-polyester blends, whilst the cheapest are made entirely of polyester fabric.

This business suit (also known as the "sack suit" in North America, commonly by Brooks Brothers) became the standard business daywear for all men who were not engaged in physical labour. The vest was worn regularly with the suit up to the Second World War, but is rarely seen today, due to central heating in offices and the expense of construction. Until at least the early 1960s, it was common to wear a hat.

In general, business suits are characterized by three styles and a fourth fusion style. English suits are noted for having a "touch fit" to the wearer's body shape and carefully made padded shoulders. Italian suits are often slimmer, with higher armholes and highly shaped to complement a slim physique. Traditional American suits have lightly padded shoulders and loose natural fit with minimal shaping. Since the 1960s, designer brands (especially Polo Ralph Lauren) have created fusion style that brings a more shaped European look to the natural American cut.

Suits in Britain were often made in tweed, often with three pieces, and were worn outside the City of London. Tweed is made from uncombed wool, and, like all fabrics from the time, was thick and durable (18-ounce was considered medium-weight in the Edwardian era). A full tweed suit is less common today, with just tweed sports jackets more often worn, but is still used generally as everyday wear by some, and for outdoor sports such as shooting and angling. It is worn with appropriate accompanying clothes, much as any other suit; brown full brogues and wool ties are common items not worn with other types of suit.

== Etiquette ==
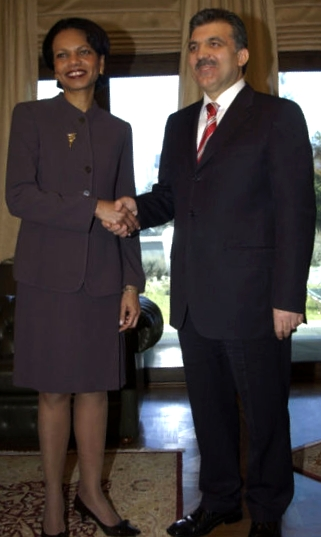
Condoleezza Rice, United States Secretary of State, and Abdullah Gül, President of Turkey, in suits (2010)

Informal attire is today considered a form of dress customarily appropriate for all formal settings, which do not explicitly require white tie or black tie, or morning dress. For instance, it is commonly worn to religious services and funerals, in public-sector offices and schools. Some professions, such as law or finance, may require it. Because of its strong association with the business world, informal attire is also known as international standard business dress, business professional or business formal.

=== Men ===
- Smart socks, differentiated from normal socks by a tighter fit and traditionally dark colours.
- Underpants, seen as required by casual and above.
- Trousers, generally monochrome, and in a dark colour or khaki. This does not normally include jeans.
- Shoes, brown or black leather shoes. This can also include boat shoes.
- Shirt, traditionally white, cream, or light blue, but pastel pink and lavender may be viewed as equally appropriate; check and striped shirts are seen as acceptable in most circumstances
- Polo shirt, replacing the shirt, this has seen a surge in fashion starting in the mid to late 2010s.
- Suit, a defining feature of "business professional attire" and "business formal"

=== Women ===
- Tights, knee highs, stockings, or leggings generally covering the legs is good practice; socks can be worn like men if trousers are worn.
- Undergarments, such as a bra and panties, the latter seen as required in casual and above.
- A dress or a set of two garments:
  - Lower garment: trousers or a skirt;
  - Upper garment: a blouse, polo neck or sweater
- Shoes, for example ballet flats, riding boots, boat shoes, loafers, or pumps.
- Makeup.

== See also ==
- Western dress codes
- Suit
- Semi-formal wear
- Formal wear
- Casual wear
