= Casual Friday =

Workplace dress style

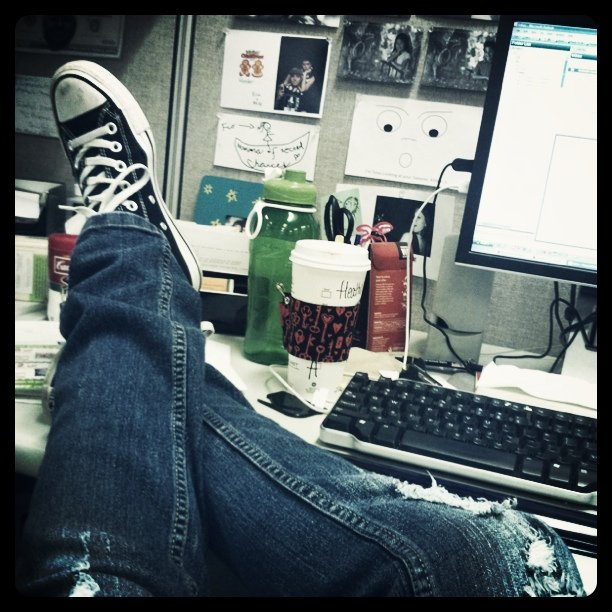
A worker wearing ripped jeans to their office on a Casual Friday

Casual Friday (also known as dress-down Friday or casual day) is a Western dress code trend in which businesses relax their dress code on Fridays. Businesses that usually require employees to wear suits, dress shirts, neckties, and dress shoes, may allow more casual or business casual wear on such days.

In 1994, 497 of the 1000 most important companies in the United States observed casual Friday, including General Motors, Ford, and IBM.

The trend originated from Hawaii's midcentury custom of Aloha Friday which slowly spread to California, continuing around the globe until the 1990s when it became known as Casual Friday. Casual Friday began in the United States in the 1950s and 1960s, when Hewlett-Packard allowed its employees to dress more casually on Friday and work on new ideas.

In Hawaii, "Aloha Wear" is suitable business attire any day of the week, and the term "Aloha Friday" is generally used simply to refer to the last day of the workweek.

Valerie Steele described the introduction of casual Friday as the most radical change in work fashion since the 1970s, when women asked for the right to wear trousers in the office.

== See also ==
- Casual wear
  - Business casual
  - Smart casual
  - Workwear
  - Sportswear
- Cool Biz campaign
- Workweek and weekend
