= Western dress codes =

Set of Western dress codes

Western dress codes are a set of dress codes detailing what clothes are worn for what occasion that originated in the Western world, particularly Western Europe and the United States, in the 19th century and which are rooted in Western culture. These codes have since been adapted to local contexts in non-Western cultures but are no longer considered Western there as a result.

== History ==
=== Historical definitions ===
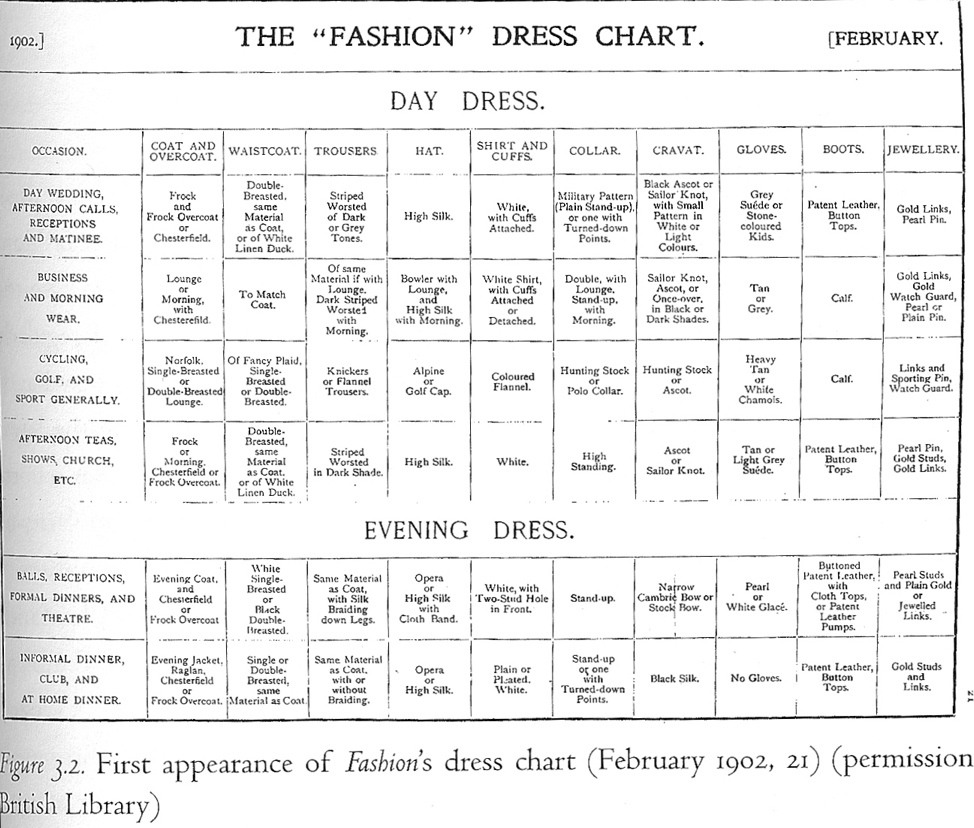
A historic chart of dress codes from Fashion, 1902

The background of traditional contemporary Western dress codes as fixed in 20th century relied on several steps of replacement of preexisting formal wear, while in turn increasing the formality levels of the previously less formal alternatives. Thus was the case with the ceasing of the justacorps, extensively worn from the 1660s until the 1790s, followed by the same fate of the 18th century frock (not to be confused with frock coat), in turn followed by the frock coat.

==== Full dress, half dress, and undress ====
Morning dress, white tie, black tie and dark suit have roots in 19th century customs subsequent to the replacement of the 18th century generic justaucorps, and has remained fixed defined since the 20th century. The 19th century frock coat rarely occurs except as formal alternative. For women, interpretations have fluctuated more dynamically according to fashion.

In the 19th century, during the Victorian and Edwardian periods, the principal classifications of clothing were full dress and undress, and, less commonly the intermediate half dress. Full dress covered the most formal option: frock coat for day wear, and dress coat (white tie) for evening wear (sometimes with supplementary alternative being a full dress uniform independent of what time of the day). As such, full dress may still appear in use designating formal wear.

When morning dress became common (in the modern sense, using a morning tailcoat rather than a frock coat), it was considered less formal than a frock coat, and even when the frock coat was increasingly phased out, morning dress never achieved full dress status. Therefore, in the 21st century, full dress often refers to white tie.

Today's black tie (originally dinner clothes) was initially described as informal wear, while the "lounge suit," now standard business wear, was originally considered (as its name suggests) casual wear. Half dress, when used, was variously applied at different times, but was used to cover modern morning dress (the term morning dress is fairly undescriptive and has not always meant modern morning dress). Undress (not to be confused with nudity) in turn was similarly loose in meaning, corresponding to anything from a dressing gown to a lounge suit or its evening equivalent of dinner clothes (now one of the more formal dress codes seen in many Western regions).

=== Historical etiquette ===
For both men and women, hats corresponding to the various levels of formality exist. As supplements to the standard dress codes, headgear can be worn, though certain settings have etiquette regarding this; for example, in Christian churches, traditional norms have enjoined the wearing of a headcovering (such as a veil or cap) by women, while men are prohibited from wearing a hat.

Ceremonial dress, military uniform, religious clothing, academic dress, and folk costume appropriate to the formality level are encouraged, but face-covering garments (niqab, hijab) are not always accepted. France outlawed the public use of burqas in 2010 and the European court of law seconded the law because "uncovered faces encourage citizens to live together" (see also burqa by country).

==== White tie ====
Typical events: State dinners and state banquets, royal balls, certain other formal balls, livery dinnersetc.

==== Morning dress ====
Typical events: Traditional weddings, formal memorial services, certain royal daytime events where the Head of State is present etc.

==== Black tie ====
Typical events: Black-tie dinners, certain opera festivals, theatre opening nights, charity balls etc. There is some variation in style depending on whether it is summer, spring, winter or autumn. See black tie for more details.

==== Lounge suit, dark suit or business formal ====
Typical events: Diplomatic and business meetings, weddings and funerals, many social occasions, everyday wear

==== Casual wear ====
Casual wear encompasses business casual, smart casual, etc.

== Categorization ==
Classifications are divided into Full dress formal wear (full dress), Half dress formal wear(half dress), Full dress informal wear (Informal/Undress), and Half dress informal wear (Semi-informal/Professional Casual; also known as business wear). Anything below this level is referred to as casual wear, which may be referred to as leisurewear or loungewear.

The term "casual" is sometimes used in combinations, such as "smart casual" or "business casual", in order to indicate higher expectations than none at all, although these classifications usually do not indicate a dress code being actually "casual" at all.

=== Civilian Wear / Local Wear ===
Dress code Synonyms	Time of day	Clothing		Local Wear (Folk Costumes, Traditional Attire, etc.)	Supplementary
Dress code Synonyms	Time of day	Masculine	Feminine	Local Wear (Folk Costumes, Traditional Attire, etc.)	Supplementary
Full evening dress e.g. "Evening dress/White tie/Full dress"	Evening	White tie	Ball gown or a full-length evening dress/evening gown	Formal folk costumes	Ceremonial dress, orders and medals, etc.
Morning dress e.g. "Morning dress/Formal day dress"	Day	Morning dress	Smart clothing	Formal folk costumes	Ceremonial dress, orders and medals, etc.
Black tie e.g. "Black tie/Dress for dinner"	Evening	Black tie	Evening gown or “elegant” trousers	Semi-formal folk costumes	Ceremonial dress, orders and medals, etc.
Lounge suit e.g. "Dark suit/Lounge suits"	Day or evening	Standard suits	Day: Skirt and jacket or trouser suit or a day dressbut no firm expectations Evening: A cocktail dress that has sleeves or an evening dress but no firm expectations	Informal folk costumes	Ceremonial dress, orders and medals, etc.
Smart casual e.g. "Smart casual/Semi-informal/Professional Casual"	Day or evening	Jacket or blazer, unevenly-coloured suits,		Semi-informal folk costumes	Ceremonial dress, orders and medals, etc.
Casual	Day or evening	Sportswear and Streetwear		Casual folk costumes	Ceremonial dress, orders and medals, etc.

=== Occupational Wear / Work uniform ===
Formality Dress Code	Military	Law Enforcement & First Responders	Education	Corporate & Professional Services
Full dress formal wear	Full dress uniform	Full dress uniform	Academic full regalia	N/A
Half dress formal wear	Mess dress uniform	Class A uniform	N/A	Business formal
Full dress informal wear	Service dress uniform	Class B uniform	N/A	Smart casual
Half dress informal wear	Combat uniform	Class C uniform	School uniform	Business casual
Casual wear	N/A	N/A	Dress down	Casual Friday
