= Smart casual =

Ambiguously defined Western dress code

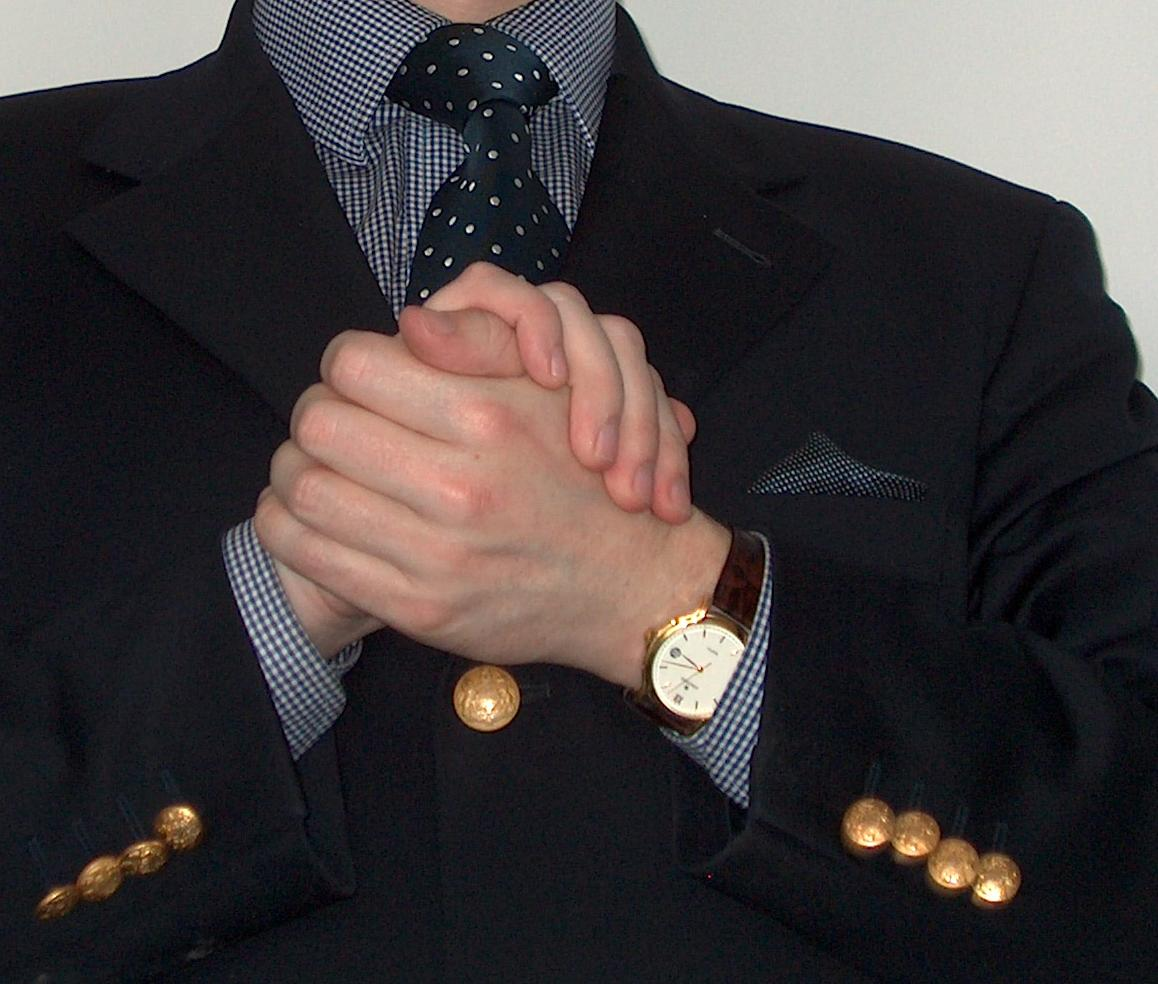
An example of smart casual attire with a blazer.

Smart casual is an ambiguously defined Western dress code that is generally considered casual wear but with smart (in the sense of "well dressed") components of a proper lounge suit from traditional informal wear. For men, this interpretation typically includes a dress shirt, necktie, trousers, and dress shoes, possibly worn with an odd-coloured blazer or a sports coat.

Smart casual formed as a dress code in the 20th century, originally designating a lounge suit of unconventional colour and less heavy and thus more casual fabric, possibly with more casual cut and details. As the one-coloured lounge suit came to define informal wear, thus uneven colours became associated with smart casual. The definition of smart casual and business casual thus became virtually undistinguishable from the 1950s, implying a more casual suit than the traditional, usual dark suit in heavy cloth.

Since the counterculture of the 1960s in the Western world, different Western cultures and events can have varying expectations of the dress code, especially with regard to necktie, and in warmer climates sometimes even with regard to a jacket at all. Therefore, the designation of certain clothing pieces as smart casual is disputed, as is its distinction, if any, from business casual.

== History ==
Smart casual was first mentioned in the Iowa newspaper The Davenport Democrat And Leader in May 1924:

The sleeveless dress with three-quarter overblouses, in smock appearance completing it for street wear, is accorded various interpretations. It is at once practiced and gives a smart casual appearance.

Smart casual was commonly used in the 20th century and merged to form the term business casual in the 1950s, implying a more casual suit than the traditional, usual dark suit in heavy cloth.

== Definitions ==
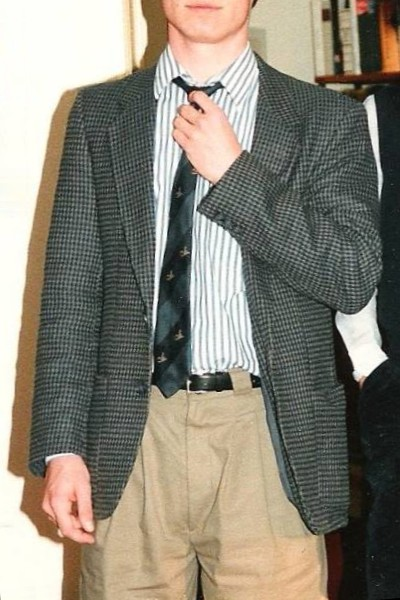
Man wearing a sport coat with khakis as part of a smart casual look.

Australia's national dictionary, Macquarie Dictionary, defines smart casual as "well-dressed in a casual style". Oxford defines it as "neat, conventional, yet relatively informal in style, especially as worn to conform to a particular dress code". Dictionary.com's 21st Century Lexicon defines it as "of clothing, somewhat informal but neat".

=== Apparel ===
Personal judgment is required to interpret the ill-defined term smart casual based on its context, theme, people, location, weather and spirit. Italian fashion house Brioni explains smart casual is not an issue of inventory or classification but rather knowledge and good taste to understand the environment; demonstrating that smart casual during summer in Sardinia is different from smart casual during winter in Toronto. An Australian freelance fashion director remarks, "Smart Casual is the dress code most open to interpretation and the one least understood", and advises wearing fresher colors, lighter, softer materials, patterned, relaxed, thoughtful, less structured, clean and not confrontational apparel, with fabrics like linen, cashmere, fine wool and cotton that are freshly laundered.

Men's fast fashion brand Topman emphasizes the flexibility of smart casual. An individual's personality and pleasure of clothing choice defines the dress code provided that the attire is a multi-purpose outfit that is acceptable for formal occasions, dating or casual social gatherings. Topman explains casual and formal clothing pieces are mixed and matched, and illustrates a smart casual outfit can include a mixture of jeans, blazers, sport coats, sweaters, necktie, a pair of Brogue shoes, dress shirts or a pair of Converse shoes.

Business blogger, Maurilio Amorim, notes that although jeans are usually not an option, the Burnt Hills smart casual variation allows for crisp blue jeans to be worn (no holes or places where you stepped on the heel too much). A tie is usually introduced to the ensemble, and the wearing of a jacket is stressed.

Norwegian and American cruise line brand Royal Caribbean International clarifies smart casual for main dining on-board its fleet: blazers, trousers, neckties or shirts are acceptable but shorts, jeans or T-shirts are unacceptable for men. Dress, casual dresses, or pantsuits are acceptable for women.

Cosmopolitan South Africa interprets smart casual as the way most South African women dress for work. In addition to work, the outfit is also interchangeable for use at large or small daytime parties, and wearing a dress shirt with elegant accessories is suggested.

Australian state newspaper The Sunday Mail in Brisbane defines a man's smart casual in a workplace and event context as a "look sharp without being too formal; it's professional but also relaxed." A jacket, dress shirt, necktie and jeans are demonstrated as smart casual attire. Piping on a jacket to give it the "preppy look" to downgrade formality is illustrated as a polished look. Detailing, such as a striped canvas belt and white shoes with a pair of casual trousers and a check shirt, is emphasized for a smart casual look. It is suggested men have: (a) a pair of chinos in any color from primary shades to pastels; (b) a short sleeve shirt in checks or a solid bright color; and (c) a deconstructed jacket in their wardrobe.

Canadian Broadcasting Corporation's Steven and Chris explain smart casual is an "easy and comfortable way to dress." Jeans, depending on the workplace's context and environment, are not recommended. For men's attire, a pair of khakis or casual pants with a collared or polo shirt and a blazer is illustrated. For women's attire, the stylists note the diversity of clothing options and recommend: (a) keeping the clothing pieces easy; (b) the fabrics not too dressy; and (c) the accessories more casual.

British national newspaper The Guardian attempts clarifying smart casual from a recruitment perspective by questioning various recruitment consultants. They responded: (a) stand out but blend in by understanding the workplace's environment; (b) achieve a business-professional look by clarifying the attire in advance because "it's easier to be overdressed than underdressed"; (c) wear a smart coat if avoiding a suit to give the impression of a "good entrance because it has an air of formality: e.g., a well-cut trench, worn with open shirt and neat slacks"; (d) wear accessories to "show creativity and attention to detail", but keep them to a minimum; (e) smart, plain and straight jeans are acceptable; and (f) shoes should be clean and un-scruffy.

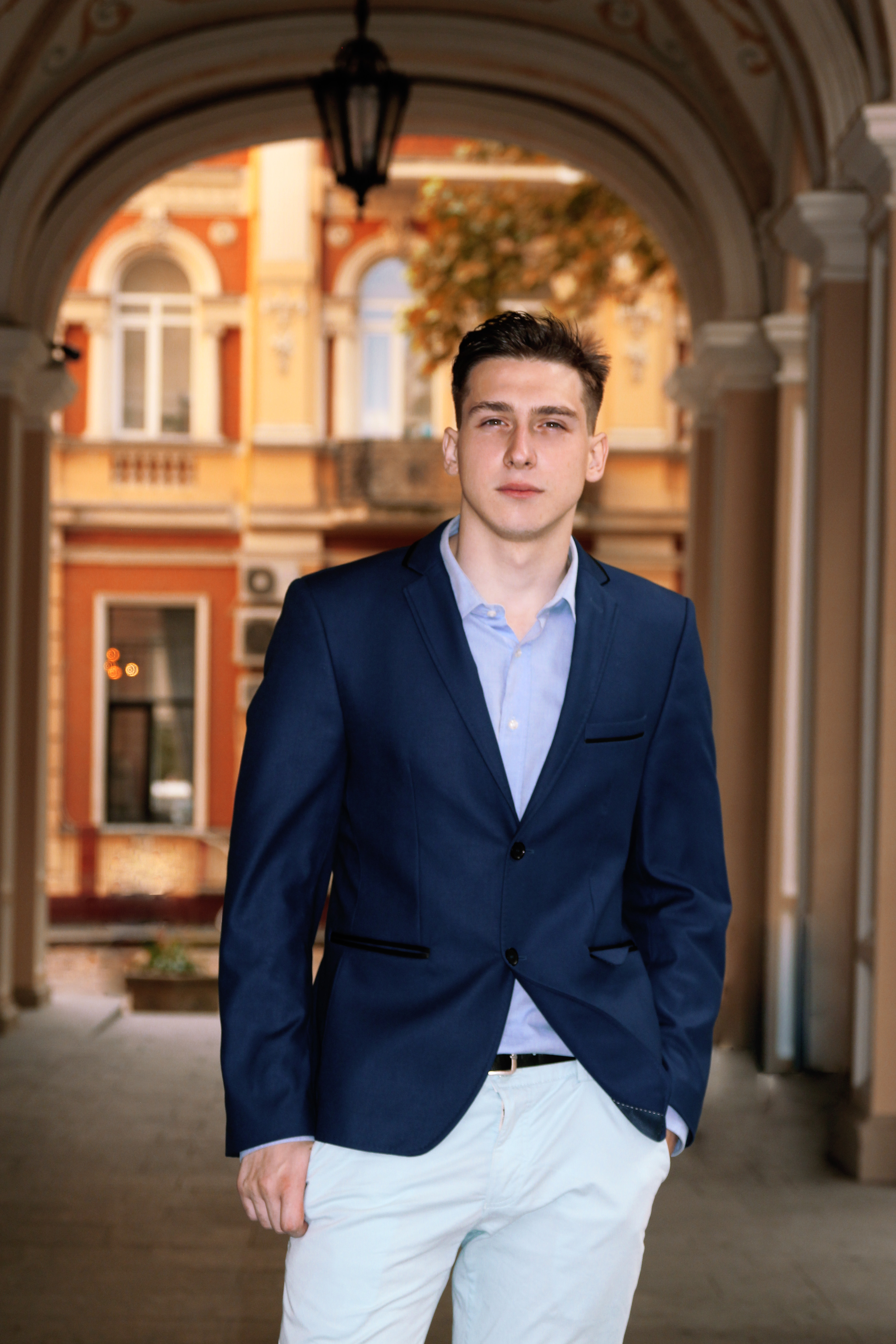
Smart casual style with non-matching trousers and without necktie

Global men's fashion magazine GQ in the United Kingdom attempts defining smart casual for a job interview. Wearing chinos, a blazer and white shirt to make an impression is suggested. Carrying a necktie is advisable; the author comments, "it is far more embarrassing to be under-dressed than over".

Pakistani fashion magazine Fashion Central defines a woman's smart casual look from an employment perspective. Understanding the workplace's environment and culture is emphasized, and checking the company's dress code guideline is highly recommended. Fashion Central outlines smart casual with clothes unstained and wrinkle-free with non-loud and non-bright colors that reflect the woman's age. Too fancy or too casual dresses are inadvisable as well as the use of extreme make-up, such as using dark, glossy or chalky shades, or applying too much eye shadow. Fashion Central reports black or brown heels are preferred by women and advise to correctly select appropriate shoes for a workplace's environment.

== See also ==
- Dress code
- Black lounge suit
- Informal wear
- Western dress codes
  - Casual wear
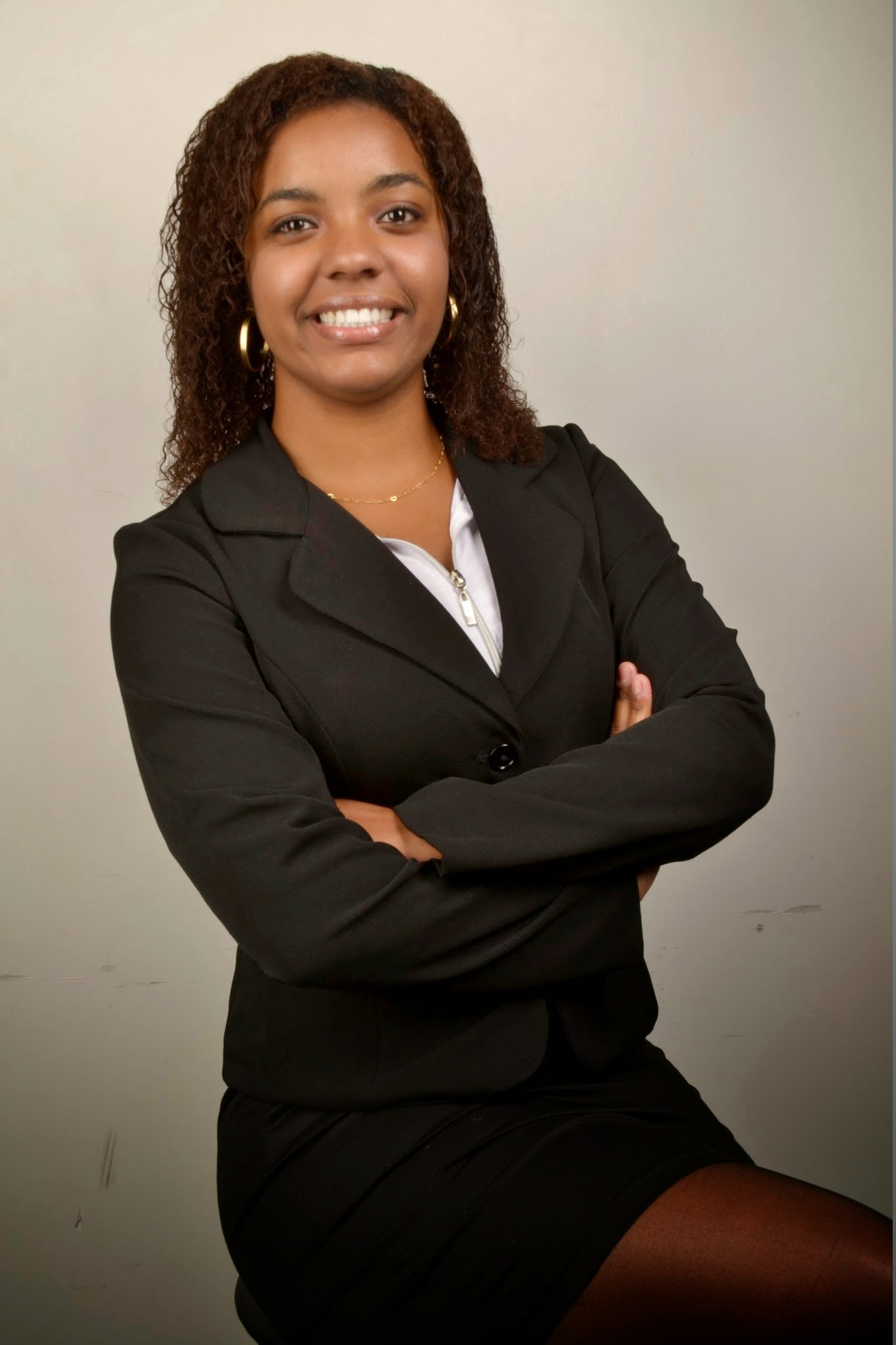
    - Women's smart casual outfit consisting of blazer, suit and skirt
      Business casual
    - Casual Friday
    - Workwear
    - Sportswear
