= Ceremonial dress =

Clothing primarily reserved for ritual or ceremonial purposes

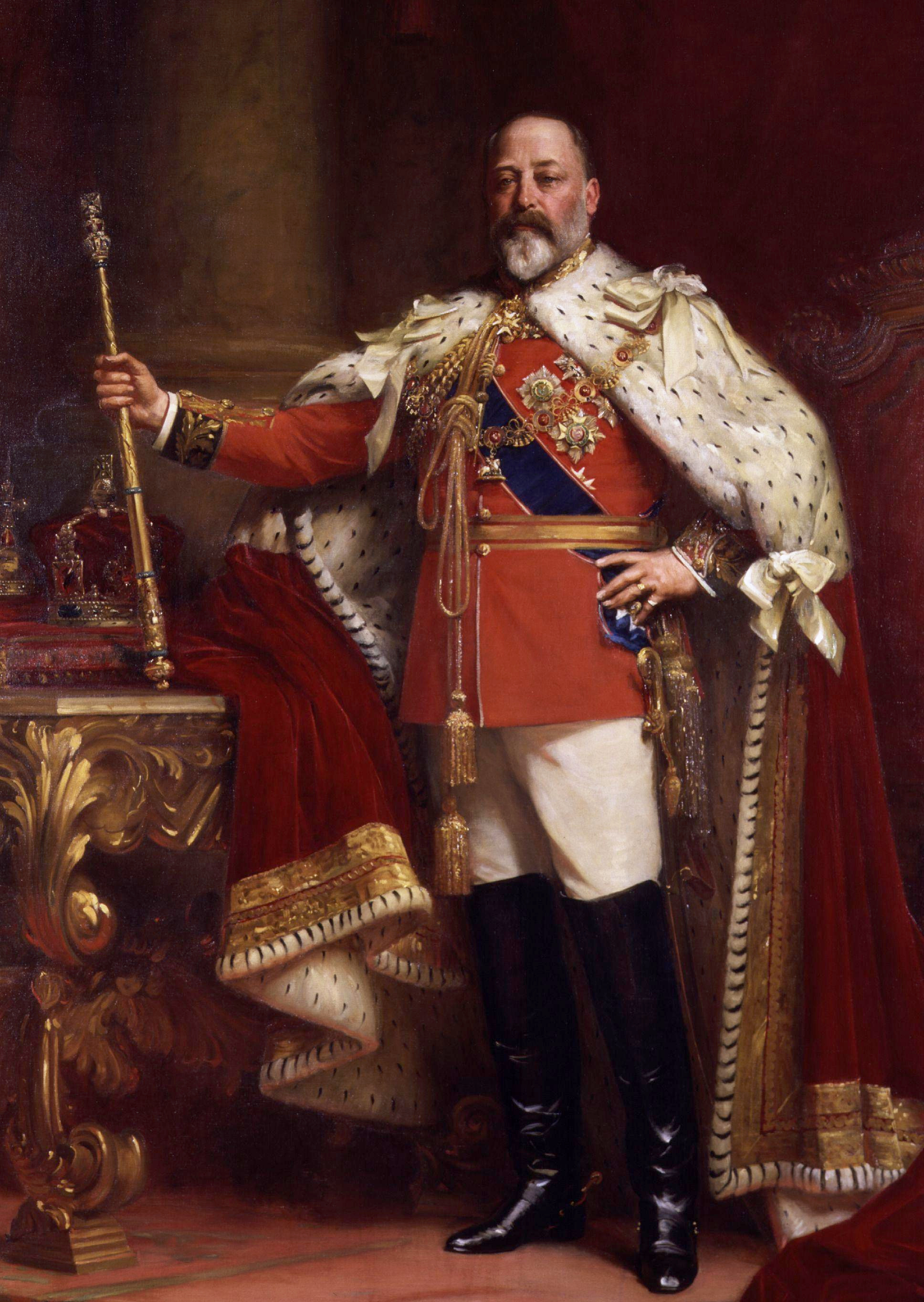
State portrait of King Edward VII of the United Kingdom, showing the coronation regalia atop a full dress military uniform

Ceremonial dress is clothing worn for very special occasions, such as coronations, graduations, parades, religious rites, trials and other important events. In the western dress code hierarchy of dress codes, ceremonial dress is often considered one of the most formal. In other cultures, ceremonial dresses vary widely, having entirely different meanings and styles.

== Examples ==
There has been documented knowledge on the effects of ceremonial clothing, with those wearing ceremonial clothing have been used to denote a wide range of usage among varying unique cultures. Examples of ceremonial dress include:

- royal cloak (ermine lined), crown and scepter of a monarch
- court dress, such as the robe and wig commonly used in Commonwealth countries
- diplomatic uniform
- the full dress uniforms of military personnel (or ceremonial suit of armor)
- religious clothing, such as liturgical vestments
- folk or tribal costumes reserved for the most formal occasions
- academic dress
- wedding clothing, including wedding dresses

== See also ==
- Fashion
- Costume
