= Business casual =

Casual Western dress code

One example of business casual attire, with a polo shirt for a man and v-neck for a woman

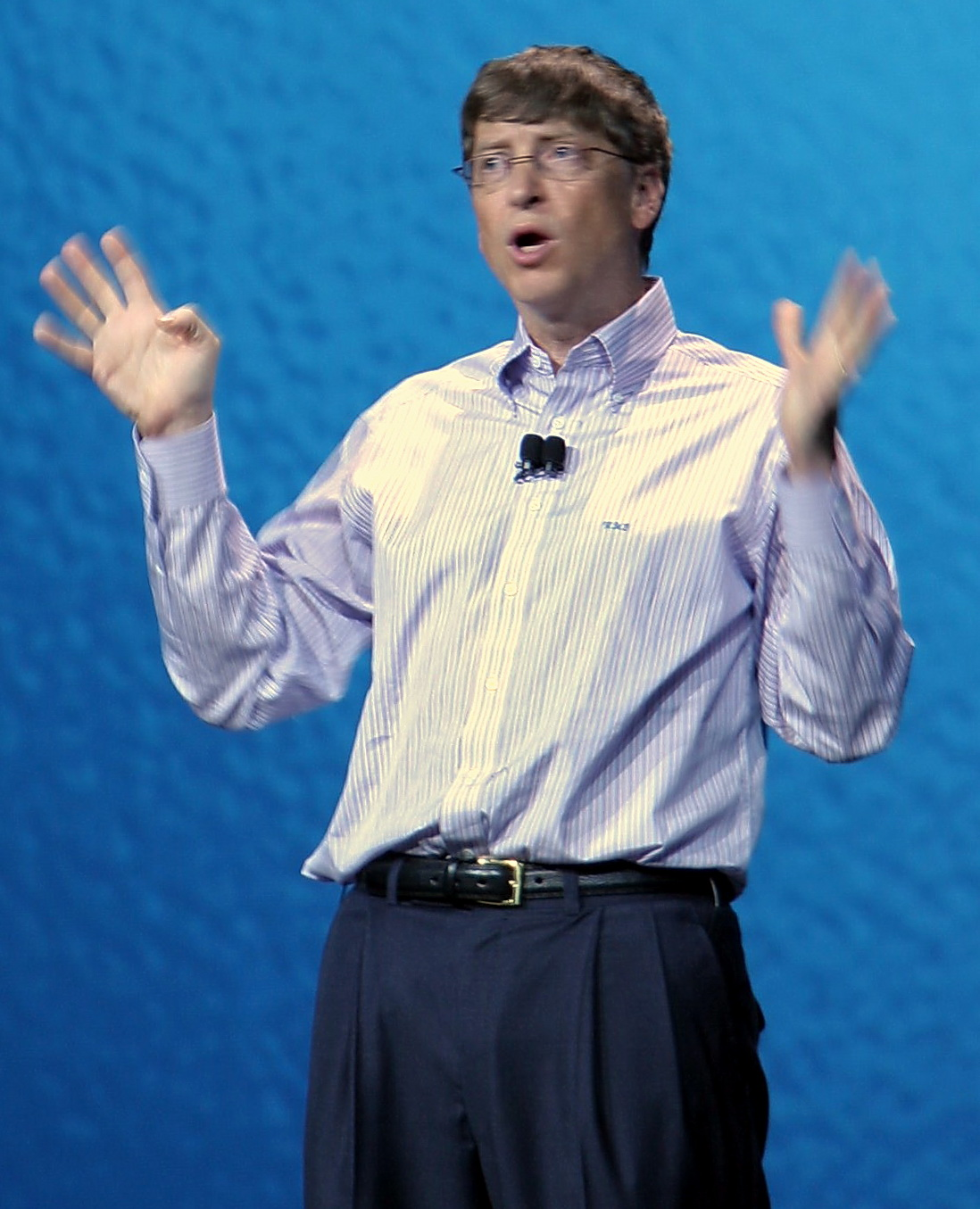
Bill Gates in tieless business casual outfit

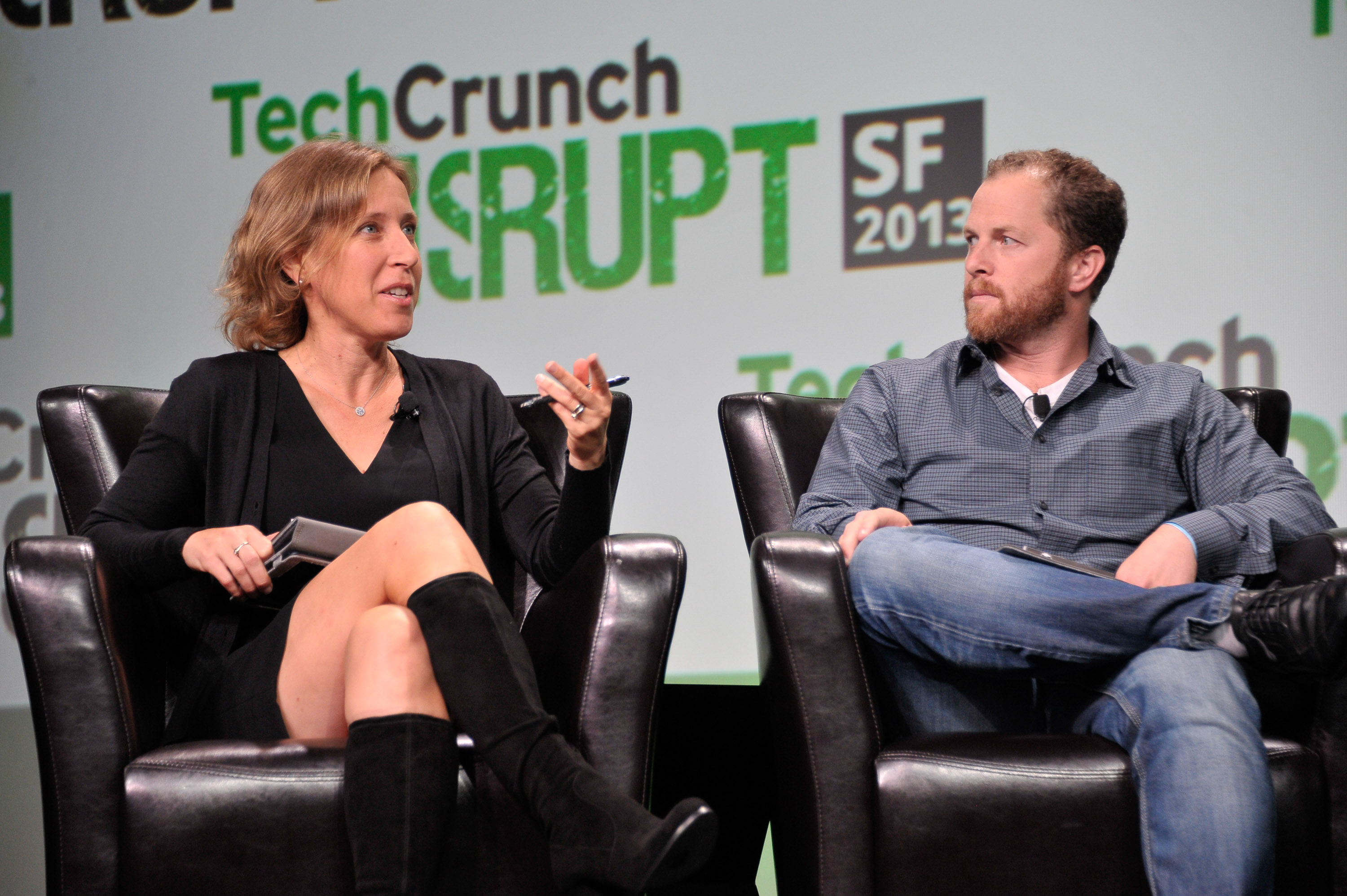
Then YouTube CEO Susan Wojcicki and David Prager in 2013. Both are wearing business casual.

Business casual is an ambiguously defined Western dress code that is a form of smart casual wear for business purposes, replacing traditional business wear ("informal wear") for white-collar workplaces. For men this consists of some components of a business suit, typically a dress shirt and trousers, but without a matching suit jacket, and with neck ties optional. A coordinating (not matching) sport coat or blazer may be worn, or omitted; a sweater or vest may be worn instead. For women, the same components can be worn (dress shirt, trousers, optional coat etc.), though usually in a female style, like a blouse for a shirt. A dress or skirt may be worn instead, generally at or just above the knee. There is significant variation; see § Definition.

Acceptance of business casual in the United States was preceded by Casual Fridays which originated in California in the 1990s, in turn inspired by the Hawaiian 1960s casual custom of Aloha Friday. The designation of particular clothing pieces as "business casual" may be contentious.

== Definition ==
There is no generally agreed definition of "business casual". One definition states that it includes khaki pants, slacks, and skirts, as well as short-sleeved polo shirts and long-sleeved shirts, but excludes tight or short skirts, T-shirts, and sweatshirts. Another states that business casual consists of neutral colors more towards the dark shades of black, gray, navy, but can include white and off white, and reminds that the clothing should be pressed and have clean, crisp seams. The "Dress for Success" advice from the University of Toronto defines business casual as "a classic, clean cut, and put together look where a full suit is not required," which means slacks, khakis, or skirts; blouses, polo shirts, or shirts with collar but no necktie; some sweaters; and closed-toe shoes. The Canadian university ends with the warning that "it is not clothing you would wear to a club or for athletic purposes.... Don’t let the word casual mislead you. You still need to look professional."

Another author wrote in the Financial Times that "Ordinarily business casual for guys seems fairly clear. It is a pair of chinos, a blazer and a good shirt, no tie."

A BBC article in 2011 suggested that a "safe global standard" consists of "a button down shirt," "jackets or blazers, khaki or gray slacks, and leather shoes." It warned, however, that great variation exists between countries and regions within countries. A U.S. menswear retailer advises men to wear a collared shirt, chinos, navy blazer, and brown shoes, while making sure to look "clean and well-groomed."

== See also ==
- Dress code
- Western dress codes
  - Casual wear
    - Smart casual
    - Casual Friday
    - Workwear
    - Sportswear
