= Alan Flusser =

American fashion designer

- Born: 16 May 1945 May 16, 1945 (age 81)
- Occupation: Author
- Known for: Mens fashion
- Website: https://alanflusser.com/

Alan J. Flusser (born 16 May 1945) is an American author and designer of men's clothing. He has been described as 'arguably the arbiter of modern American men's wear.'

He owns and operates Alan Flusser Custom in New York City.

== Early life and education ==
Flusser was born in West Orange, New Jersey. In 1979 he founded Alan Flusser Designs. He is a graduate of the University of Pennsylvania.

== Career ==
Flusser designed a sportswear line for Pierre Cardin, and worked for Phillips-Van Heusen

In 1985 he launched Alan Flusser Custom which focuses on custom and made-to-measure suits. In 1993, Alan Flusser Enterprises, facing financial difficulties, filed for Chapter 11 bankruptcy protection.

Flusser designed the wardrobe for Gordon Gekko (played by Michael Douglas) in Wall Street and designed clothing for the films Barbarians at the Gate, Scent of a Woman, and American Psycho (film) starring Christian Bale as Patrick Bateman.

== Influence ==
Flusser had huge influence on popular culture through movies that today have cult following, most notably Wall Street and American Psycho. He played a major role in promotion of style inspired by 1930s, which is today accepted as a golden age of men's fashion. In his own words:

For the first time American men realized that clothing should not be worn to hide the natural lines of the body, but, rather, to conform to them, thereby enhancing the male physique. At the same time, clothes should not be too obvious. Instead, they had to become part of the man who was wearing them. The idea of clothing was not to set the man apart (as had been the case for centuries, when kings and noblemen dressed primarily to accomplish just that) but to allow him to be an individual among individuals…. Americans had finally learned that the goal of good clothing was to flatter rather than be conspicuous.

== Bibliography ==
- Flusser, Alan (1981). Making the Man: The Insider's Guide to Buying Men's Clothes. Simon & Schuster. ISBN 0-671-79147-8.
- Flusser, Alan (1985). Clothes and the Man: The Principles of Fine Men's Dress. Villard. ISBN 0-394-54623-7.
- Flusser, Alan (1996). Style and the Man: How and Where to Buy Fine Men's Clothes. HarperCollins. ISBN 0-06-270155-X.
- Flusser, Alan (2002). Dressing the Man: Mastering the Art of Permanent Fashion. HarperCollins. ISBN 0-06-019144-9.
- Flusser, Alan (2010). Style and the Man. HarperCollins. ISBN 9780061976155.
- Flusser, Alan (2019). Ralph Lauren: In His Own Fashion. Harry N. Abrams. ISBN 978-1419741463.

== Awards and honors ==
Flusser won the 1983 Coty Award as Top Menswear Designer, and received the Cutty Sark Award in 1987.
