= Suit =

Informal Western dress code

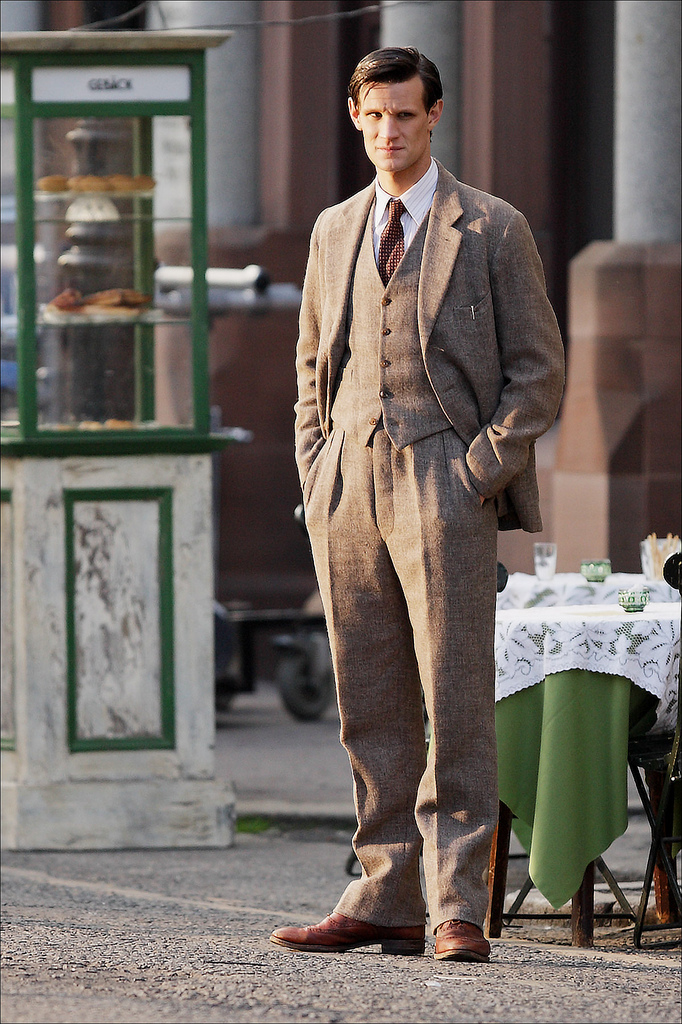
Actor Matt Smith wearing a tweed three-piece suit

A suit, also called a lounge suit, business suit, dress suit, or formal suit, is a set of clothes comprising a suit jacket and trousers of identical textiles generally worn with a collared dress shirt, necktie, and dress shoes. A skirt suit is similar, but with a matching pencil skirt instead of trousers. It is currently considered semi-formal wear or business wear in contemporary Western dress codes; however, when the suit was originally developed it was considered an informal or more casual option compared to the prevailing clothing standards of aristocrats and businessmen. The lounge suit originated in 19th-century Britain as sportswear and British country clothing, which is why it was seen as more casual than citywear at that time, with the roots of the suit coming from early modern Western Europe formal court or military clothes. After replacing the black frock coat in the early 20th century as regular daywear, a sober one-coloured suit became known as a lounge suit.

Suits are offered in different designs and constructions. Cut and cloth, whether two- or three-piece, single- or double-breasted, vary, in addition to various accessories. A two-piece suit has a jacket and trousers; a three-piece suit adds a waistcoat. Hats were almost always worn outdoors (and sometimes indoors) with all men's clothes until the counterculture of the 1960s in Western culture. Informal suits have been traditionally worn with a fedora, a trilby, or a flat cap. Other accessories include handkerchief, suspenders or belt, watch, and jewelry.

Other notable types of suits are for what would now be considered formal occasions—the tuxedo or dinner suit (black tie) and the black lounge suit (stroller)—both which originally arose as less formal alternatives for the prior formal wear standards known as white tie, which incorporated items such as the dress coat, and of morning dress, which incorporated items such as the morning coat with formal trousers.

Originally, suits were always tailor-made from the client's selected cloth. These are now known as bespoke suits, custom-made to measurements, taste, and style preferences. Since the 1960s, most suits have been mass-produced ready-to-wear garments. Currently, suits are offered in roughly four ways:

- bespoke, in which the garment is custom-made by a tailor from a pattern created entirely from the customer's measurements, giving the best fit and free choice of fabric;
- made to measure, in which a pre-made pattern is modified to fit the customer, and a limited selection of options and fabrics is available;
- ready-to-wear, off-the-peg (Commonwealth English), or off-the-rack (American English), sold ready-made, although minor tailor alterations are possible;
- suit separates, where lounge jacket and trousers are sold separately to minimize alterations needed, including also odd-colored blazers or sports coats as smart casual options

== Terminology ==
The word suit derives from French suite 'following', from some Late Latin derivative form of the Latin verb sequor 'I follow', because the component garments (jacket and trousers and waistcoat) follow each other and have the same cloth and colour and are worn together.

== History ==
The suit's origins trace the simplified, sartorial standard established by the English king Charles II in the 17th century, following the example of his one-time host King Louis XIV's court at Versailles, who decreed that in the English Court men would wear a long coat, a waistcoat (then called a "petticoat"), a cravat (a precursor of the necktie), a wig, knee breeches (trousers), and a hat. The paintings of Jan Steen, Pieter Bruegel the Elder, and other painters of the Dutch Golden Era reveal that such an arrangement was already used in Holland, if not Western Europe as a whole.

The current styles, founded in the Great Male Renunciation of the late 18th century, sharply changed the elaborately embroidered and jewelled formal clothing into the simpler clothing of the British Regency period, which gradually evolved to the stark formality of the Victorian era. In the late 19th century, it was in the search for more comfort that the loosening of rules gave rise to the modern lounge suit.

Brooks Brothers is generally credited with first offering the "ready-to-wear" suit, a suit that was sold already manufactured and sized, ready to be tailored, while Haggar Clothing first introduced the concept of suit separates in the U.S., which are widely found in the marketplace today.

== Elements ==
There are many possible variations in the choice of the style, the garments, and the details of a suit.

=== Cut ===
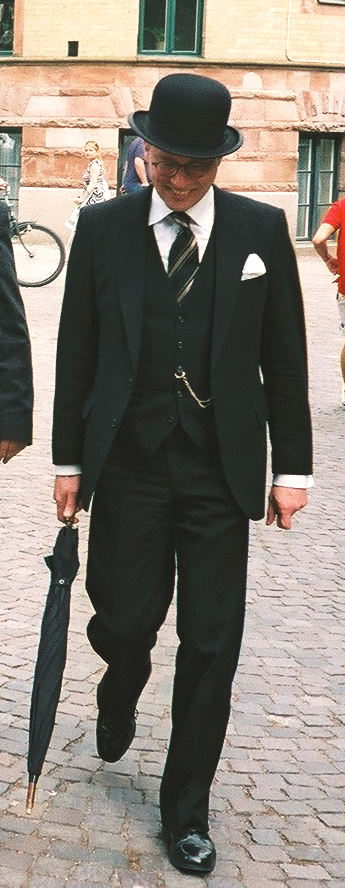
A man dressed in a three-piece suit and bowler hat

The silhouette of a suit is its outline. Tailored balance created from a canvas fitting allows a balanced silhouette so a jacket need not be buttoned and a garment is not too tight or too loose. A proper garment is shaped from the neck to the chest and shoulders to drape without wrinkles from tension. Shape is the essential part of tailoring that often takes hand work from the start. The two main cuts are double-breasted suits, a conservative design with two columns of buttons, spanned by a large overlap of the left and right sides; and single-breasted suits, in which the sides meet in the centre of the torso with a single column of buttons, overlapping only enough for one, two or three buttons to close, with by convention the jacket front cut so that the lowest button is not designed to close.

Different styles of tailoring create different silhouettes, from the heavily padded military-inspired cut of traditional British tailors, to the less structured Neopolitan style. An essential part of this profile shaping is the inclusion of darts, reductions of fabric which allow for the coat to have a stronger shape. For example, the American sack suit does not feature darts, which creates a straighter and looser fit.

There are three ways to buy suits:

1. Ready-made and altered "sizes" or precut patterns, a convenience that often is expressed over time with wrinkles from poor shaping, leading to distortion;
2. The made-to-measure suit, in which a pre-existing pattern is altered to reflect the individual's preference or nuances of physique to achieve things like the style, lengths, shoulder slope and point-to-point and trouser fitting;
3. The custom, bespoke, or tailoring-designed suit, which has at least one basted fitting in which a half-made coat (usually just scraps of cloth basted together) is worn by the client to let the tailor readjust the pattern several times before finishing the garment. This process can take the tailor easily 80 hours.

The acid test of authentic tailoring standards is the wrinkle that comes from poor tailoring. Rumples can be pressed out. For interim fittings, "Rock Of Eye" (which means trained freehand based on an experienced artistic eye to match the item to the wearer, trusting the eye over unyielding scripted approach), drawing and cutting inaccuracies are overcome by the fitting.

=== Fabric ===
Suits are made in a variety of fabrics, but most commonly from wool, silk or cotton. The two main yarns produce worsteds (where the fibres are combed before spinning to produce a smooth, hard wearing cloth) and woollens (where they are not combed, thus remaining comparatively fluffy in texture). These can be woven in a number of ways, producing flannel, tweed, gabardine, and fresco among others. These fabrics all have different weights and feels, and some fabrics have an S (or Super S) number describing the fineness of the fibres measured by average fibre diameter, e.g., Super 120; the finer the fabric, the more delicate and thus less likely to be long-wearing it will be. Although wool has traditionally been associated with warm, bulky clothing meant for warding off cold weather, advances in making finer and finer fibre have made wool suits acceptable for warmer weather, as fabrics have accordingly become lighter and more supple. Wool fabric is denominated by the weight of a one-square yard piece; thus, the heavier wools, suitable for winter only, are 12–14 oz.; the medium, "three-season" (i.e., excluding summer) are 10–11 oz.; and summer wools are 7–8 oz. (In the days before central heating, suits were worn indoors, and heavier wools such as 16 oz. were used; now they are used mainly in overcoats and topcoats.) Other materials are used sometimes, either alone or blended with wool, such as cashmere. Silk alone or blended with wool is sometimes used. Synthetic materials, e.g., polyester, while cheaper, are very rarely recommended by experts. At most, a blend of predominantly wool may be acceptable to obtain the main benefit of synthetics, namely resistance to wrinkling, particularly in garments used for travel. However, synthetic blends decrease the breathability of wool, and wool-blend fabrics will be warmer and clammier than wool alone. For hot weather, linen is also used, and in the Southern United States, cotton seersucker is worn.

The main four colours for suits worn in business are black, light grey, dark grey, and navy, either with or without patterns. In particular, grey flannel suiting has been worn very widely since the 1930s. In non-business settings or less-formal business contexts, brown is another important colour; olive also occurs. In summer, lighter shades such as tan or cream are popular.

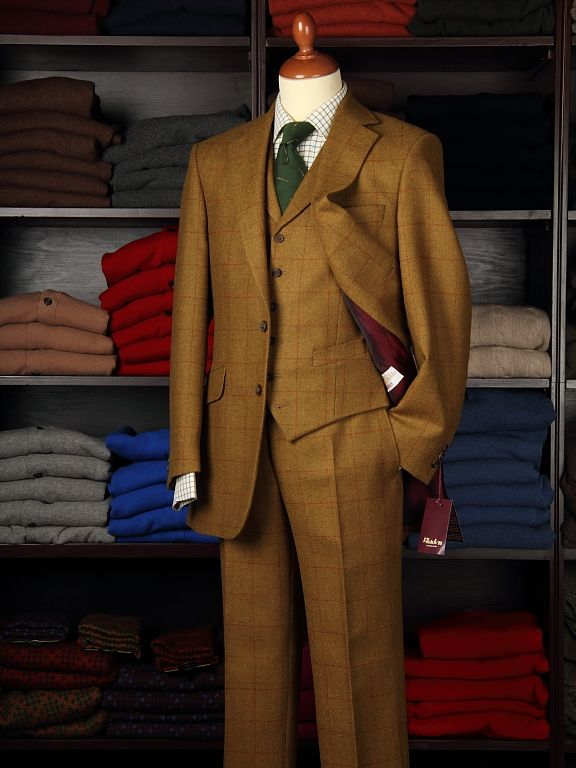
Three-piece tweed suit

For non-business use, tweed has been popular since Victorian times and still is commonly worn. A wide range of colour is available, including muted shades of green, brown, red, and grey. Tweeds are usually checked, or plain with a herringbone weave, and are most associated with the country. While full tweed suits are not worn by many now, the jackets are often worn as sports jackets with odd trousers (trousers of different cloth).

The most conventional suit has two or three buttons and is either medium-to-dark grey or navy. Other conservative colours are grey, black, and olive. White and light blues are acceptable at some events, especially in the warm season. Red and the brighter greens are usually considered "unconventional" and "garish". Tradition calls for a gentleman's suit to be of decidedly plain colour, with splashes of bright colour reserved for shirts, neckties or kerchiefs.

In the United States and the United Kingdom, around the start of the 20th century, lounge suits were never traditionally worn in plain black, this colour instead being reserved for formal wear (including dinner jackets or strollers) and for mourning. However, the decline of formal wear since the 1950s and the rise of casual wear in 1960s allowed the black suit to return to fashion, as many designers began wanting to move away from the business suit toward more fashion-forward suits.

Traditional business suits are generally in solid colours or with pinstripes; windowpane checks are also acceptable. Outside business, the range of acceptable patterns widens, with plaids such as the traditional glen plaid and herringbone, though apart from some very traditional environments such as London banking, these are worn for business now, as well. The colour of the patterned element (stripes, plaids, and checks) varies by gender and location. For example, bold checks, particularly with tweeds, have fallen out of use in the US, while they continue to be worn as traditional in Britain. Some unusual old patterns such as diamonds are now rare everywhere.

Inside the jacket of a suit, between the outer fabric and the inner lining, there is a layer of sturdy interfacing fabric to prevent the wool from stretching out of shape; this layer of cloth is called the canvas after the fabric from which it was traditionally made. Expensive jackets have a floating canvas, while cheaply manufactured models have a fused (glued) canvas. A fused canvas is less soft and, if poorly done, damages the suppleness and durability of the jacket, so many tailors are quick to deride fused canvas as being less durable, particularly since they may tend to permanently pucker along the jacket's edges after some use or a few dry cleanings. However, some selling this type of jacket claim that the difference in quality is very small. A few London tailors state that all bespoke suits should use a floating canvas.

=== Jacket ===
==== Front buttons ====
Single- vs. double-breasted jacket

Most single-breasted suits have two or three buttons, and four or more buttons are unusual. Dinner jackets ("black tie") usually have only one button. It is rare to find a suit with more than four buttons, although zoot suits can have as many as six or more due to their longer length. There is also variation in the placement and style of buttons, since the button placement is critical to the overall impression of height conveyed by the jacket. The centre or top button will typically line up quite closely with the natural waistline. The bottom button is usually not meant to be buttoned and so the jacket is cut such that buttoning the bottom button would ruin the lines and drape of the jacket. It is customary to keep the jacket buttoned while standing and to unbutton the jacket while seated.

Double-breasted jackets have only half their outer buttons functional, as the second row is for display only, forcing them to come in pairs. Some rare jackets can have as few as two buttons, and during various periods, for instance the 1960s and 70s, as many as eight were seen. Six buttons are typical, with two to button; the last pair floats above the overlap. The three buttons down each side may in this case be in a straight line (the 'keystone' layout) or more commonly, the top pair is half as far apart again as each pair in the bottom square. A four-button double-breasted jacket usually buttons in a square. The layout of the buttons and the shape of the lapel are coordinated to direct the eyes of an observer. For example, if the buttons are too low, or the lapel roll too pronounced, the eyes are drawn down from the face, and the waist appears larger. There seems to be no clear rule as to on which side the overlap should lie. It usually crosses naturally with the left side to the fore but not invariably. Generally, a hidden button holds the underlap in place.

==== Lapels ====
Notched lapel

Peaked lapel

Shawl lapel

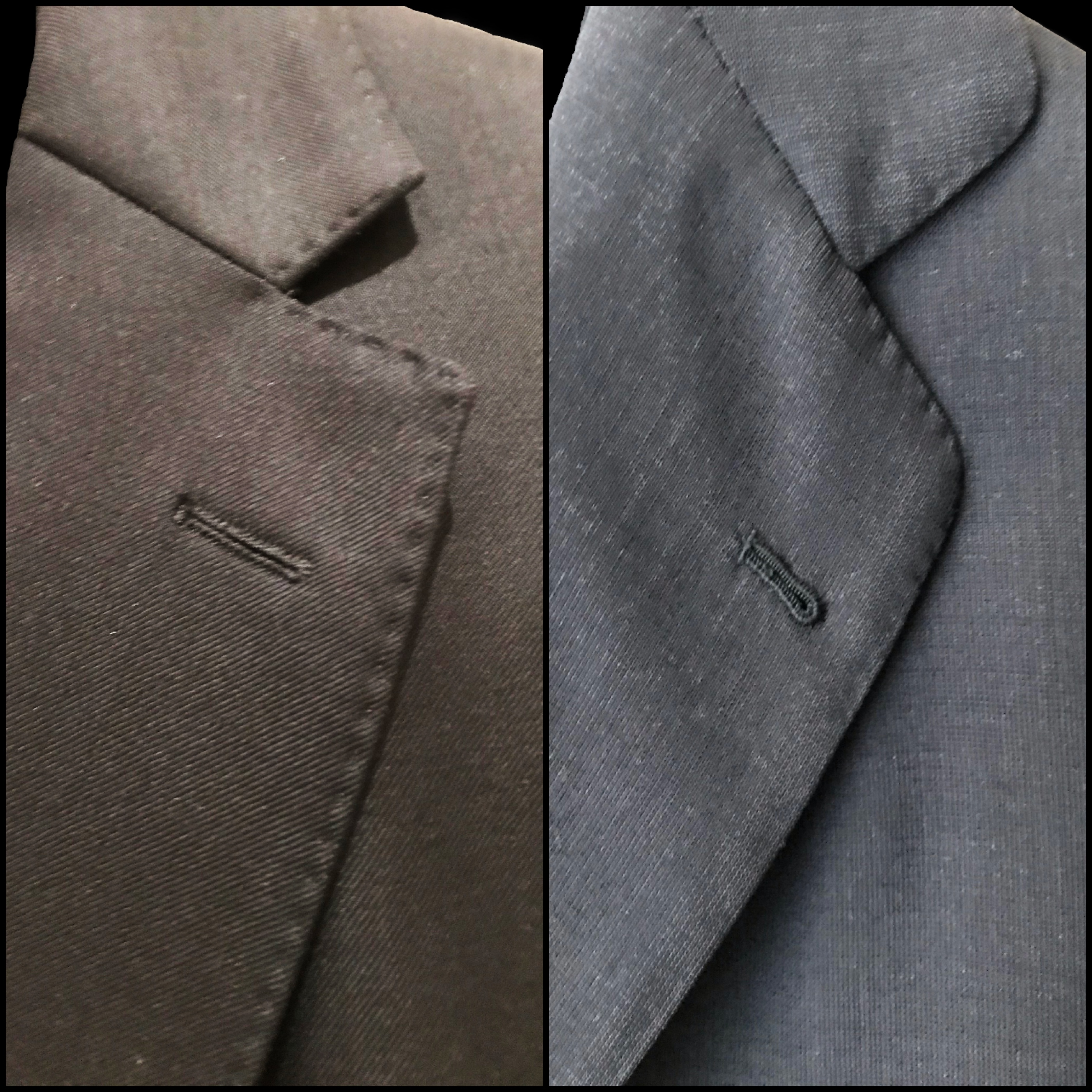
Comparison of two notched lapel cuts: English (left) and Spanish (right). The former is the most commonly seen notched lapel.

The jacket's lapels can be notched (also called "stepped"), peaked ("pointed"), shawl, or "trick" (Mandarin and other unconventional styles). Each lapel style carries different connotations and is worn with different cuts of suit. Notched lapels, the most common of the three, are usually only found on single-breasted jackets and are the most informal style. They are distinguished by a 75- to 90-degree "notch" at the point where the lapel meets the collar. Peaked lapels have sharp edges that point upward towards the shoulders. Double-breasted jackets usually have peaked lapels, although peaked lapels are sometimes found on single-breasted jackets as well. Shawl lapels are a style derived from the Victorian informal evening wear and, as such, are not normally seen on suit jackets except for tuxedos or dinner suits. For black tie events, only jackets with pointed and shawl lapels should be worn.

In the 1980s, double-breasted suits with notched lapels were popular with power suits and the New Wave style.

In the late 1920s and 1930s, a popular design was the single-breasted peaked-lapel jacket. This style has gone in and out of vogue, being popular once again during the 1970s, and is still an alternative. The ability to properly cut peaked lapels on a single-breasted suit is one of the most challenging tailoring tasks, even for very experienced tailors.

The width of the lapel is a varying aspect of suits and has changed over the years. The 1930s and 1970s featured exceptionally wide lapels, whereas during the late 1950s and most of the 1960s suits with very narrow lapels—often only about 1 inch (2.5 cm) wide—were in fashion. The 1980s saw mid-size lapels with a low gorge (the point on the jacket that forms the "notch" or "peak" between the collar and front lapel). Trends from the mid-2000s to the 2010s were towards a narrower lapel and higher gorge (along with a correspondingly high buttoning point and shorter overall jacket length). Lapels have gradually widened again in the 2020s, alongside the return of a more traditional jacket length, but the gorge and button stance both remain high. Necktie width usually follows the width of the jacket lapel.

Lapels also have a buttonhole, intended to hold a boutonnière, a decorative flower. These are now only commonly seen at more formal events. Usually, double-breasted suits have one hole on each lapel (with a flower just on the left), while single-breasted suits have just one on the left.

==== Pockets ====
Most jackets have a variety of inner pockets and two main outer pockets, which are generally either patch pockets, flap pockets, or jetted ("besom") pockets. The patch pocket is, with its single extra piece of cloth sewn directly onto the front of the jacket, a sporting option, sometimes seen on summer linen suits or other informal styles. The flap pocket is standard for side pockets, and has an extra lined flap of matching fabric covering the top of the pocket. A jetted pocket is most formal, with a small strip of fabric taping the top and bottom of the slit for the pocket. This style is most often on seen on formalwear, such as a dinner jacket.

A breast pocket is usually found at the left side, where a pocket square or handkerchief can be displayed.

In addition to the standard two outer pockets and breast pocket, some suits have a fourth, the ticket pocket, usually located just above the right pocket and roughly half as wide. While this was originally exclusively a feature of country suits, used for conveniently storing a train ticket, it is now seen on some town suits. Another country feature also worn sometimes in cities is a pair of hacking pockets, which are similar to normal ones, but slanted; this was originally designed to make the pockets easier to open on horseback while hacking.

==== Sleeves ====
Suit jackets in all styles typically have three or four buttons on each cuff, which are often purely decorative (the sleeve is usually sewn closed and cannot be unbuttoned to open). Five buttons are unusual and are a modern fashion innovation. The number of buttons is primarily a function of the formality of the suit; a very casual summer sports jacket might traditionally (1930s) have had only one button, while tweed suits typically have three and city suits four. In the 1970s, two buttons were seen on some city suits. Today, four buttons are common on most business suits and even casual suits.

Although the sleeve buttons usually cannot be undone, the stitching is such that it appears they could. Functional cuff buttons may be found on high-end or bespoke suits; this feature is called a surgeon's cuff and "working button holes" (U.S.). Some wearers leave these buttons undone to reveal that they can afford a bespoke suit, although it is proper to leave these buttons done up. Modern bespoke styles and high-end off-the-rack suits equipped with surgeon's cuffs have the last two buttons stitched off-centre, so that the sleeve hangs more cleanly should the buttons ever be undone. Certainty in fitting sleeve length must be achieved, as once working button holes are cut, the sleeve length essentially cannot be altered further.

A cuffed sleeve has an extra length of fabric folded back over the arm, or just some piping or stitching above the buttons to allude to the edge of a cuff. This was popular in the Edwardian era, as a feature of formalwear such as frock coats carried over to informalwear, but is now rare.

==== Vents ====
A vent is a slit in the bottom rear (the "tail") of the jacket. Originally, vents were a sporting option, designed to make riding easier, so are traditional on hacking jackets, formal coats such as a morning coat, and, for practicality, overcoats. Today there are three styles of venting: the single-vented style (with one vent at the centre), the ventless style, and the double-vented style (one vent on each side). Vents are convenient, particularly when using a pocket or sitting down, to improve the hang of the jacket, so are now used on most jackets. Ventless jackets are associated with Italian tailoring, while the double-vented style is typically British. Dinner jackets traditionally have no vents. The hook vent, a single central vent with a slit to the side, is characteristic of American Ivy Style.

=== Waistcoats ===
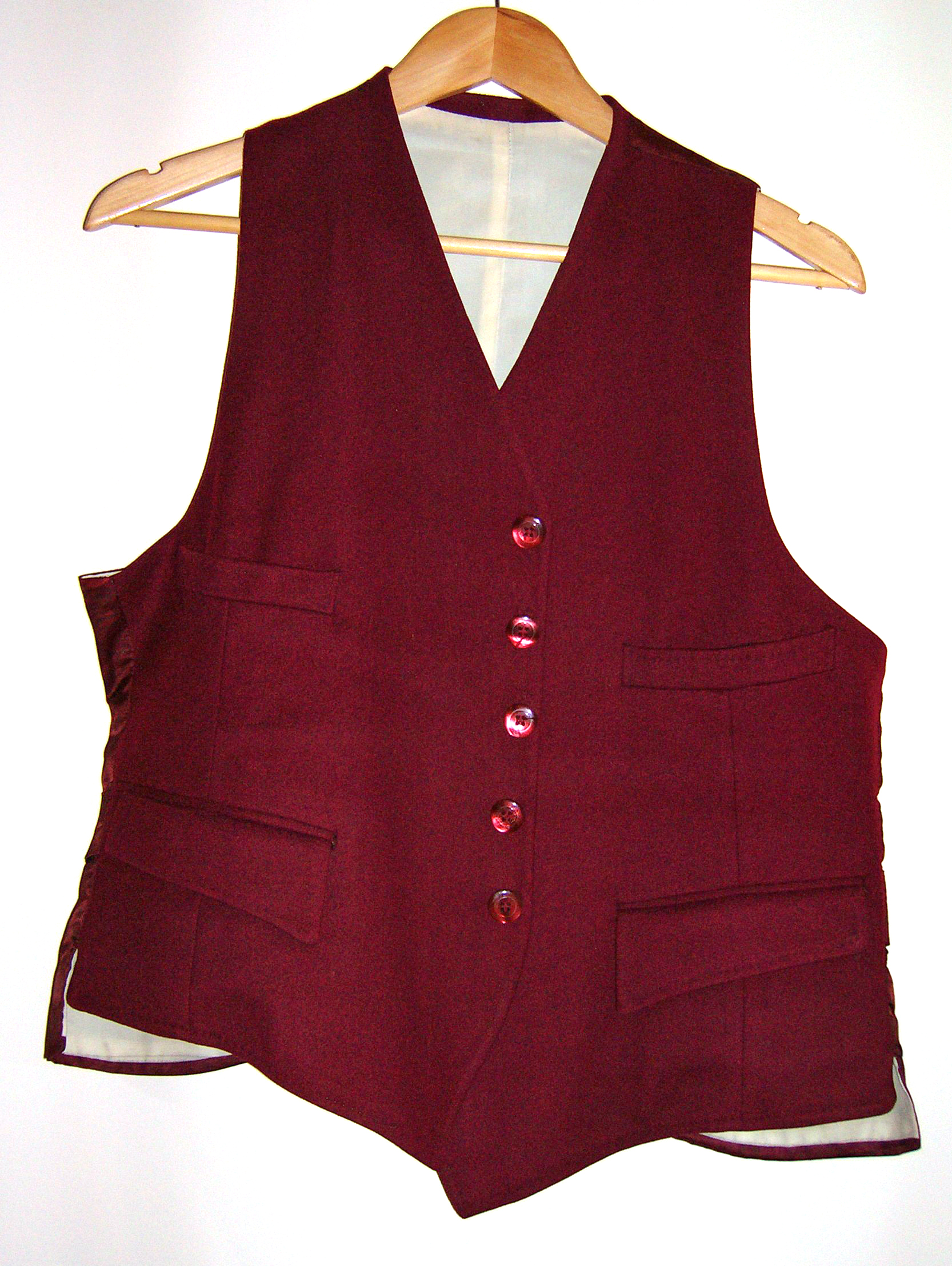
A traditional waistcoat, to be worn with a two-piece suit or separate jacket and trousers

Waistcoats (called vests in American English) were almost always worn with suits prior to the 1940s. Their use began to decline during the Great Depression as financial pressures drove men to forgo the extra expense of a waistcoat, and attenuated further due to the fabric rationing in place during World War II and postwar spread of central heating; their use has gone in and out of vogue since then. A pocket watch on a chain, one end of which is inserted through a middle buttonhole, was often worn with a waistcoat; however, men have largely worn wristwatches since World War I, when they came to prominence out of military necessity. Though now rare, pocket watches may still be worn with any suit except full evening dress (white tie). Although many examples of waistcoats worn with a double-breasted jacket can be found from the 1920s to the 1940s, that would be unusual today (one point of a double-breasted jacket being, it may be supposed, to eliminate the need for a waistcoat in terms of both warmth and waist/shirt coverage). Traditionally, the bottom button of a waistcoat is left undone; like the vents in the rear of a jacket, this helps the body bend when sitting. Some waistcoats can have lapels; others do not.

=== Trousers ===
Suit trousers are always made of the same material as the jacket. Even from the 1910s to 1920s, before the invention of sports jackets specifically to be worn with odd trousers, wearing a suit jacket with odd trousers was seen as an alternative to a full suit. However, with the modern advent of sports jackets, suit jackets are always worn with matching trousers, and the trousers are worn with no jacket or the appropriate jacket.

Trouser width has varied considerably throughout the decades. In the 1920s, trousers were straight-legged and wide-legged, with a standard width at the cuff of 23 inches (58 cm). After 1935, trousers began to be tapered in at the bottom half of the leg. Trousers remained wide at the top of the leg throughout the 1940s. By the 1950s and 1960s, a more slim look had become popular. In the 1970s, suit makers offered a variety of styles of trousers, including flared, bell-bottomed, wide-legged, and more traditional tapered trousers. In the 1980s, these styles disappeared in favor of tapered, slim-legged trousers.

One variation in the design of trousers is the use or not of pleats. The most classic style of trouser is to have two pleats, usually forward, since this gives more comfort sitting and better hang standing. This is still a common style, and for these reasons of utility has been worn throughout the 20th century. The style originally descended from the exaggeratedly widened Oxford bags worn in the 1930s in Oxford, which, though themselves short-lived, began a trend for fuller fronts. The style is still seen as the smartest, featuring on dress trousers with black and white tie. However, at various periods throughout the last century, flat-fronted trousers with no pleats have been worn, and the swing in fashions has been marked enough that the more fashion-oriented ready-to-wear brands have not produced both types continuously.

Turn-ups on the bottom of trousers, or cuffs, were initially popularised in the 1890s by Edward VII, and were popular with suits throughout the 1920s and 1930s. They have always been an informal option, being inappropriate on all formalwear.

Other variations in trouser style include the rise of the trouser. This was very high in the early half of the 20th century, particularly with formalwear, with rises above the natural waist, to allow the waistcoat covering the waistband to come down just below the narrowest point of the chest. Though serving less purpose, this high height was duplicated in the daywear of the period. Since then, fashions have changed, and have rarely been that high again, with styles returning more to low-rise trousers, even dropping down to have waistbands resting on the hips. Other changing aspects of the cut include the length, which determines the break, the bunching of fabric just above the shoe when the front seam is marginally longer than height to the shoe's top. Some parts of the world, such as Europe, traditionally opt for shorter trousers with little or no break, while Americans often choose to wear a slight break.

A final major distinction is made in whether the trousers take a belt or braces (suspenders). While a belt was originally never worn with a suit, the forced wearing of belts during wartime years (caused by restrictions on use of elastic caused by wartime shortages) contributed to their rise in popularity, with braces now much less popular than belts. When braces were common, the buttons for attaching them were placed on the outside of the waistband, because they would be covered by a waistcoat or cardigan, but now it is more frequent to button on the inside of the trouser. Trousers taking braces are rather different in cut at the waist, employing extra girth and also height at the back. The split in the waistband at the back is in the fishtail shape. Those who prefer braces assert that, because they hang from the shoulders, they always make the trousers fit and hang exactly as they should, while a belt may allow the trouser waist to slip down on the hips or below a protruding midsection, and requires constant repositioning; also, they allow, indeed work best with, a slightly looser waist which gives room for natural expansion when seated.

Suit trousers, also known as dress pants in the US, are a style of trousers intended as formal, semi-formal, or informal wear. They are often made of either wool or polyester (although many other synthetic and natural textiles are used) and may be designed to be worn with a matching suit jacket. Suit trousers often have a crease in the front of each pant leg, and may have one or more pleats. Suit trousers can be worn at many formal and semi-formal occasions combined with a shirt that has no tie and a more relaxed fashion, which can be considered smart casual dress.

=== Breeches ===
As an alternative to trousers, breeches (or knickers in variations of English where this does not refer to underwear) may be worn with informal suits, such as tweed. These are shorter, descending to just below the knees, fastened closely at the top of the calf by a tab or button cuff. While once common, they are now typically only worn when engaged in traditional outdoor sports, such as shooting or golf. The length and design is closely related to the plus-fours (and plus-sixes etc.) worn for sport, but differ in having no bagginess. They are usually designed to be worn with long socks meeting just below the knee, but riding breeches, worn with long boots such as top boots, are long enough to meet the boot and display no sock.

=== Accessories ===
Accessories for suits include neckties, shoes, wristwatches and pocket watches, pocket squares, cufflinks, tie clips, tie tacks, tie bars, bow ties, lapel pins, and hats.

== Etiquette ==
=== Buttoning the suit jacket ===
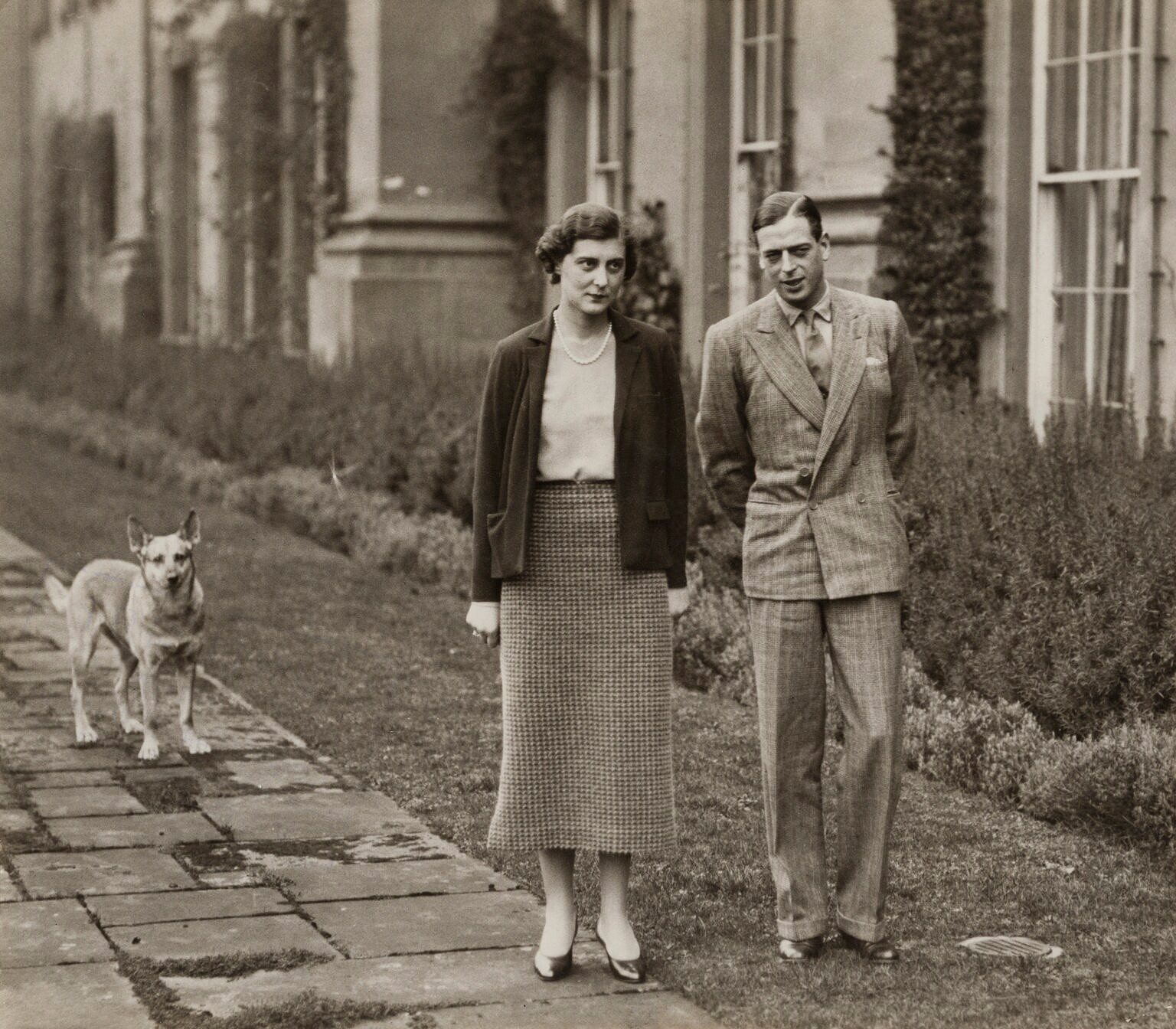
Prince George, Duke of Kent in the early 1930s wearing a double-breasted suit with a low button-stance

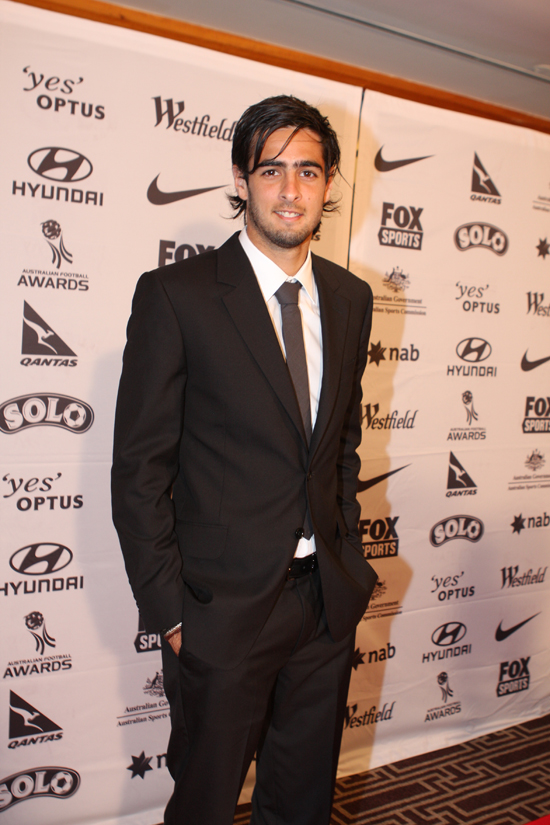
The bottom button of a single-breasted suit coat is left unfastened.

The buttoning of the jacket is primarily determined by the button stance, a measure of how high the buttons are in relation to the natural waist. In some (now unusual) styles where the buttons are placed high, the tailor would have intended the suit to be buttoned differently from the more common lower stance. Nevertheless, some general guidelines are given here.

Double-breasted suit coats are almost always kept buttoned. When there is more than one functional buttonhole (as in a traditional six-on-two arrangement), only one button need be fastened; the wearer may elect to fasten only the bottom button to present a longer line (a style popularised by Prince George, Duke of Kent).

Single-breasted suit coats may be either fastened or unfastened. In two-button suits the bottom button is traditionally left unfastened except with certain unusual cuts of jacket, e.g. the paddock. Legend has it that King Edward VII started the trend of leaving the bottom button of a suit as well as waistcoat undone. The reasoning for having only the top buttons and not the bottom button to continue being fastened is to avoid stressing of the fabric and is more comfortable for the wearer.

When fastening a three-button suit, the middle button is fastened, and the top one sometimes, but the bottom is traditionally not designed to be. Although in the past some three-button jackets were cut so that all three could be fastened without distorting the drape, this is no longer the case. A four-button suit is uncommon. The one-button suit has regained some popularity (it is also one of the classic styles of Savile Row tailoring). With a single-breasted suit, the buttons are usually unfastened while sitting down to avoid an ugly drape. A double-breasted suit is often able to be left buttoned, to avoid the difficulty of constantly redoing the inner button (the "anchor button") when standing up.

=== Socks with suits ===
In the United States it is common for socks to match either the shoe (particularly black socks with black shoes) or the trouser leg. This latter is preferred as it makes the leg appear longer, provides a smoother visual transition between the pant leg and the shoe, and minimises the attention drawn by a trouser leg tailored to be too short. A more general rule is for socks to be darker than the shade of the trousers, but potentially a different, instead matching some other part of the outfit such as the shirt or necktie. With patterned socks, ideally the background colour of the sock should match the primary colour of the suit and the other colors should coordinate with other parts of the outfit.

Socks are preferably at least mid-calf height, if not knee-height (over-the-calf), and are usually made predominantly of cotton or wool, though luxury or dress socks may use more exotic blends such as silk and cashmere. Before World War II, patterned socks were common, and a variety of designs like Argyle or contrasting socks were commonly seen. After WWII, socks became more subdued in colour. In lieu of over-the-calf length (which will stay up by itself), some men still use garters to hold up their socks, but this is unusual.

=== Women ===
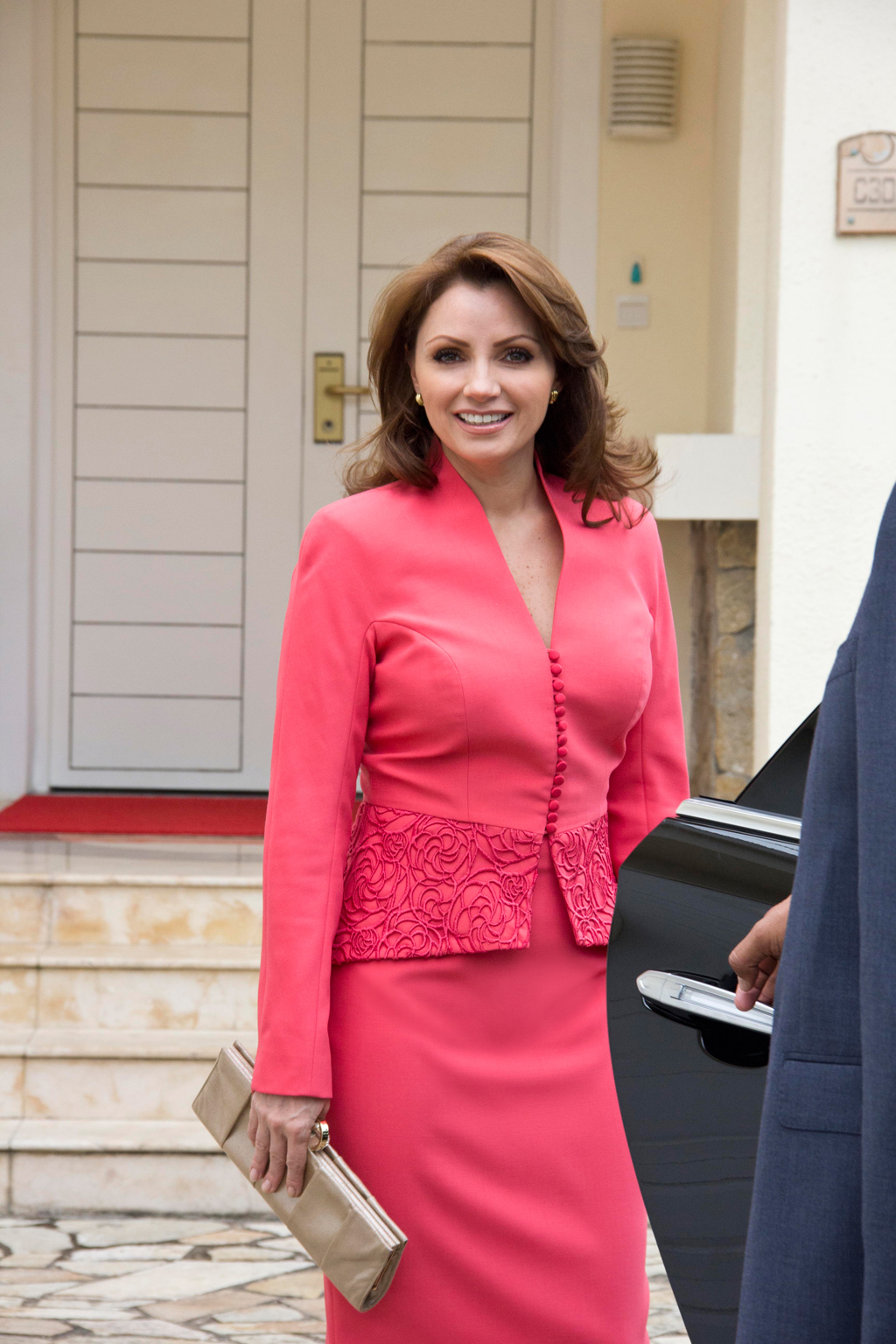
Angélica Rivera wearing a modern-day skirt suit

Suit-wearing etiquette for women generally follows the same guidelines used by men, with a few differences and more flexibility.

For women, the skirt suit or dress suit are both acceptable; a blouse, which can be white or coloured, usually takes the place of a shirt. Women's suits can also be worn with coloured tops or T-shirts. Also, women usually wear suits in professional settings, rather than as general formal attire, as men do.

Women's suits come in a larger variety of colours, such as darks, pastels, and gem colours.

Women generally do not wear neckties with their suits, but some do. Fancy silk scarves that resemble a floppy ascot tie became popular in North America in the 1970s. By the 1980s, women were entering the white-collar workforce in increasing numbers, and their dress fashions adopted looks not dissimilar from men's business wear. By the early to mid-1980s, conservatively tailored skirt suits were the norm, in the same colours and fabrics considered standard in men's suits. These were typically worn with buttoned-up collared blouses, usually white or some pastel in colour. These were frequently accessorised with a version of the bow tie, usually the same fabrics, colours, and patterns as men's neckties and bow ties, but tied in a fuller bow at the collar. Pantyhose are worn with the skirt suit in black, nude or white.

== Fashion ==
=== Western world ===
Throughout the 20th and 21st centuries, the tailors of England, Italy, Spain, and France have been the leaders in the design of men's suits. The slim-fitting mohair and sharkskin suits developed in London and Milan during the 1960s were widely imitated by the mod subculture, and underwent a large scale revival during the late 2000s to mid 2010s due to their association with James Bond and Don Draper from Mad Men.

Elsewhere in the Mediterranean, suits are considered impractical without constant air conditioning. As a result, most non-conservative businesses, regardless of size or wealth, tend to use casual clothes even in formal meetings. Some professions, such as banking, law, and certain government employees that deal directly with the public do have a more formal dress code.

==== United States ====
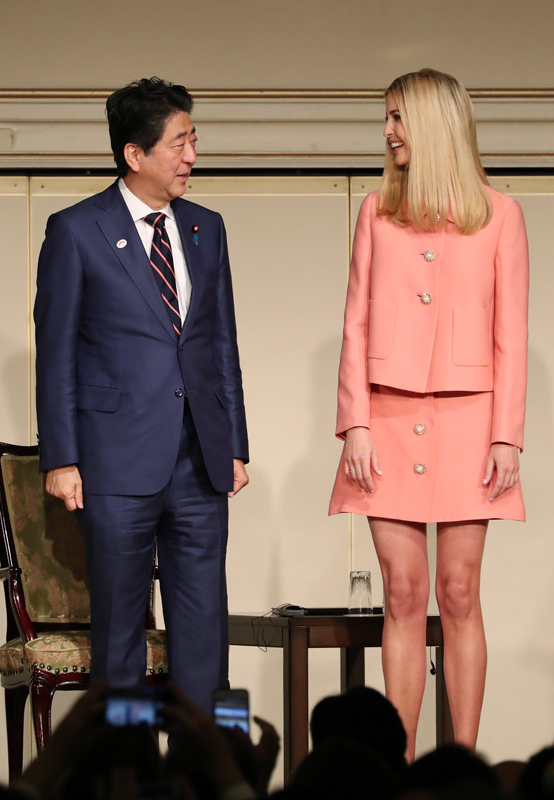
Former Japanese PM Shinzō Abe along with Ivanka Trump wearing Western-style business suits

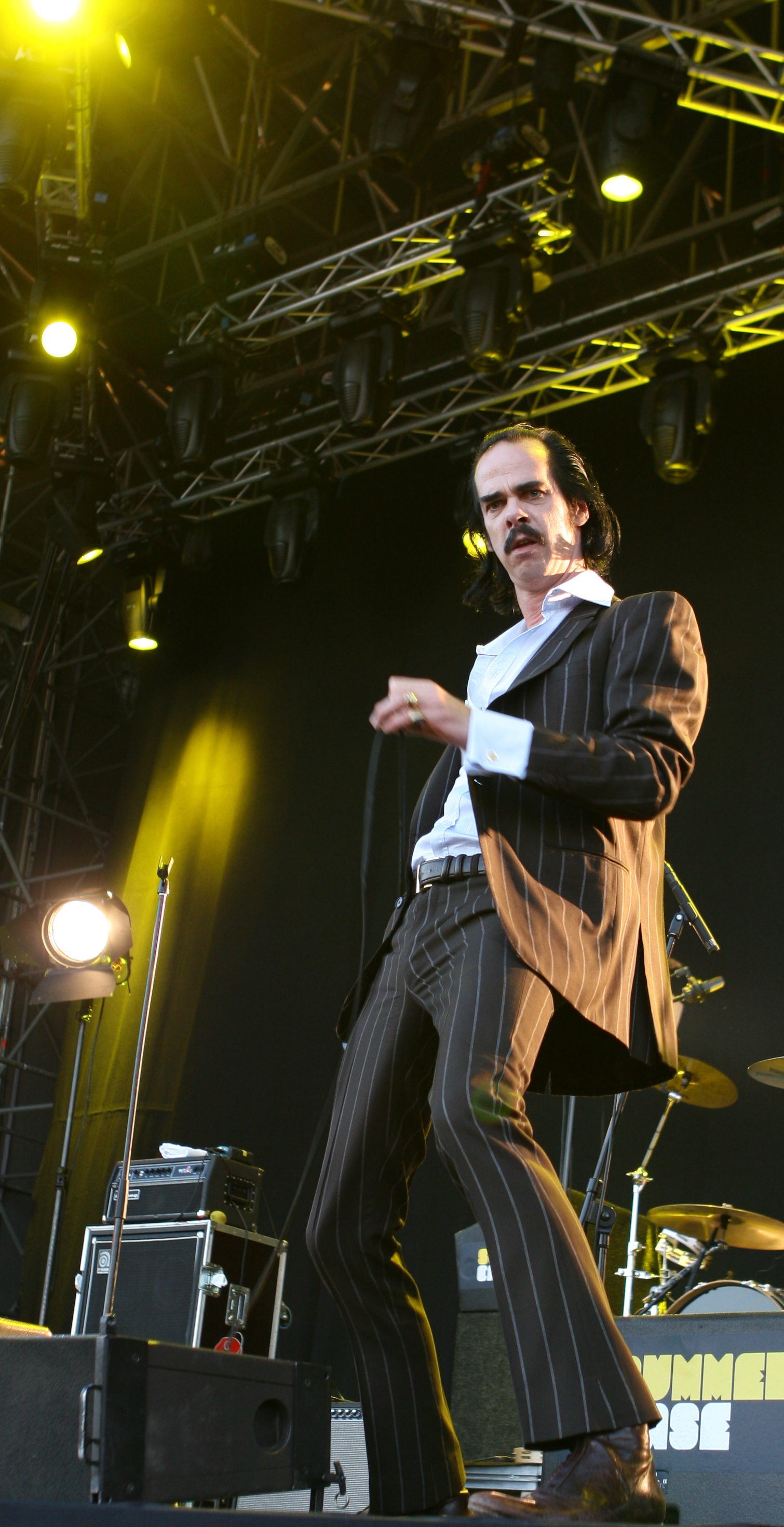
Rock musician Nick Cave wears a pinstripe suit while performing onstage.

Because wearing a suit conveys a respectable image, many people wear suits during the job interview process. An interview suit is usually a conservative style, and often made of blue or grey fabric. Interview suits are frequently composed of wool or wool-blend fabric, with a solid or pin stripe pattern. The style of an interview suit, however, will depend on the organizational culture of the industry in which a person seeks employment.

In the Southwestern United States, men's suits often feature detailing inspired by traditional Western wear, such as a pointed yoke and arrow pockets. Suit coats similar in appearance to the Ike jacket are also widespread, and it is common practice to wear cowboy boots instead of conventional dress shoes. Country music singers and modern pop stars like Post Malone or Brandon Flowers of The Killers sometimes wear flashy Nudie suits with rhinestones and intricate embroidery.

In modern society, men's suits have become less common as an outfit of daily wear. During the 1990s, driven in part by the meteoric rise of newly successful technology companies with different cultural attitudes, the prevailing management philosophy of the time moved in favour of more casual attire for employees; the aim was to encourage a sense of openness and egalitarianism. "Business casual" dress still tends to be the norm for most workers up to and sometimes including mid-level management. Traditional business dress as an everyday style has been prevalent in middle- and upper-level corporate management (now sometimes collectively referred to as "suits"), and the professions (particularly law). Over time, suits have become less common at the executive level aside for job candidates and formal events, remaining in widespread use at other lives such as among middle-class hotel clerks and salespeople. Casual dress has also become common in Western academic institutions, with traditional business attire falling in popularity.

For many men who do not wear suits for work, particularly in Western society, wearing a suit is reserved for special occasions, such as weddings, funerals, court appearances, and other more formal social events. Hence, because they are not a daily outfit for most men, they are often viewed as being "stuffy" and uncomfortable. The combination of a tie, belt and waistcoat can be tight and restrictive compared to contemporary casual wear, especially when these are purchased at minimal cost and quality for rare occasions, rather than being made to be worn comfortably. This tendency became prevalent enough that the Christian Science Monitor reported that a heavy jacket combined with a necktie and flimsy slacks was "a design that guarantees that its wearer will be uncomfortable" at any temperature. During the late 1960s and early 1970s, men's suits became less commonly worn, in much the same way that skirts and dresses were dropped by many women in favour of trousers. This was seen as a liberation from the conformity of earlier periods and occurred concurrently with the women's liberation movement.

The suit appears in rock, heavy metal, and goth subcultures, even though such groups were known for rebellious clothing. Artists and bands such as Nick Cave, Interpol, Marilyn Manson, Blutengel, Albert Hammond Jr. of The Strokes and Akercocke have worn suits in music videos and stage performances.

=== Eastern European ===
In areas of Eastern Europe, western suit fashion is widely adopted alongside cultural variations that place greater emphasis on national identity, ornamentation, and historical symbolism. Examples include the Chokha in Georgia and the Caucasus region, and the Bocskai suit from Hungary. In Ukraine following the separation from the Soviet Union, embroidered Vyshyvanka shirts have become a popular expression of cultural heritage and adopted into both formal and casual attire.

=== Latin American ===
In Jamaica, the two piece Kariba suit is viewed as a replacement for the western European style suit as it is more comfortable clothing for the warm tropical climate. Similarly the Guayabera shirt popular in Latin America made of linen, silk, or cotton appropriate for hot and humid weather may be worn as formal or business wear in lieu of or with a suit jacket.

=== Africa ===
African suit fashion is characterized by the incorporation of African textiles having distinct colors and print patterns or embroidery. An alternate suit style includes the senator suit style originating from Nigeria which combines a tailored tunic top with matching trousers.

=== East and South Asia ===
Japanese men adopted the western suit of the British style following the Meiji restoration. By the end of the 20th century, the tailored suit had become associated with Japan's salaryman culture. Suits tailored in Japan are known for high quality craftsmanship and a fitted precision cut aesthetic.

In 20th-century China, the Communist government encouraged citizens to wear the Mao suit due to its egalitarian and utilitarian design.

After the independence of India, there was a backlash against Western fashions due to their association with the previous colonialist regime. Instead, professional Indian men began wearing the five button Nehru suit, made from khadi to support the local textile industry. During the 1960s, these suits became fashionable among the British mod subculture due to their use by The Beatles. These made a brief comeback during the mid 2000s, but since 2010 they have been out of fashion in the West.

== See also ==
- Western dress codes
  - Semi-formal wear
    - Black tie
    - Black lounge suit
  - Informal wear
- Casual
  - Smart casual
  - Business casual

== General and cited references ==
- Antongiavanni, Nicholas (2006). The Suit: A Machiavellian Approach to Men's Style. HarperCollins. ISBN 978-0-06-089186-2.
- Boucher, François (1967). 20,000 Years of Fashion: The History of Costume and Personal Adornment. New York: Harry N. Abrams Inc.
- Boyer, G. Bruce (1990). Eminently Suitable: The Elements of Style in Business Attire. Tony Kokinos (illustrator). New York: W. W. Norton & Company. ISBN 978-0-393-02877-5.
- Calasibetta, Charlotte Mankey (2003). The Fairchild Dictionary of Fashion. Fairchild Publications. ISBN 1-56367-235-9.
- Croonborg, Frederick (1907). The Blue Book of Men's Tailoring. New York and Chicago: Croonborg Sartorial Co.
- Druesedow, Jean L.; Jno. J. Mitchell Co. (1990). Men's Fashion Illustrations from the Turn of the Century: by Jno. J. Mitchell Co. Courier Dover Publications. ISBN 978-0-486-26353-3.
- The New-Way Course in Fashionable Clothes-Making. Fashion Institute. 1926. OCLC 55530806. Archived from the original on 5 July 2008.
- Flusser, Alan (1985). Clothes and the Man: The Principles of Fine Men's Dress. Villard. ISBN 0-394-54623-7. Archived from the original on 25 August 2019.
- Flusser, Alan (1996). Style and the Man. HarperCollins. ISBN 0-06-270155-X.
- Flusser, Alan (2002). Dressing the Man: Mastering the Art of Permanent Fashion. HarperCollins. ISBN 0-06-019144-9.
- Keers, Paul (October 1987). A Gentleman's Wardrobe: Classic Clothes and the Modern Man. Weidenfeld & Nicolson. ISBN 978-0-297-79191-1.
- Kidwill, Claudia B. (1974). Suiting Everyone: The Democratization of Clothing in America. Smithsonian Institution Press.
