= Sport coat =

Type of men's smart casual lounge jacket

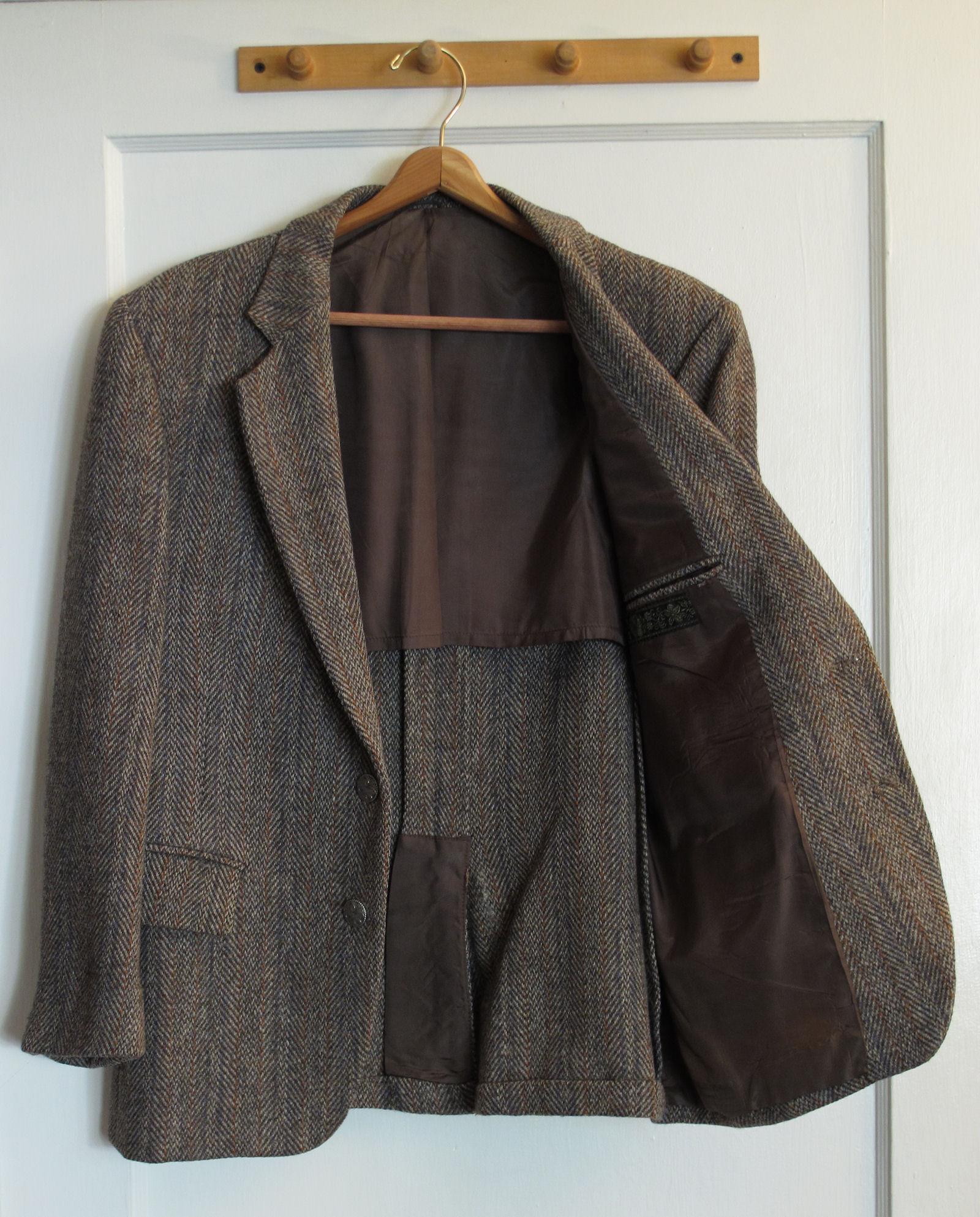
Tweed sports jacket

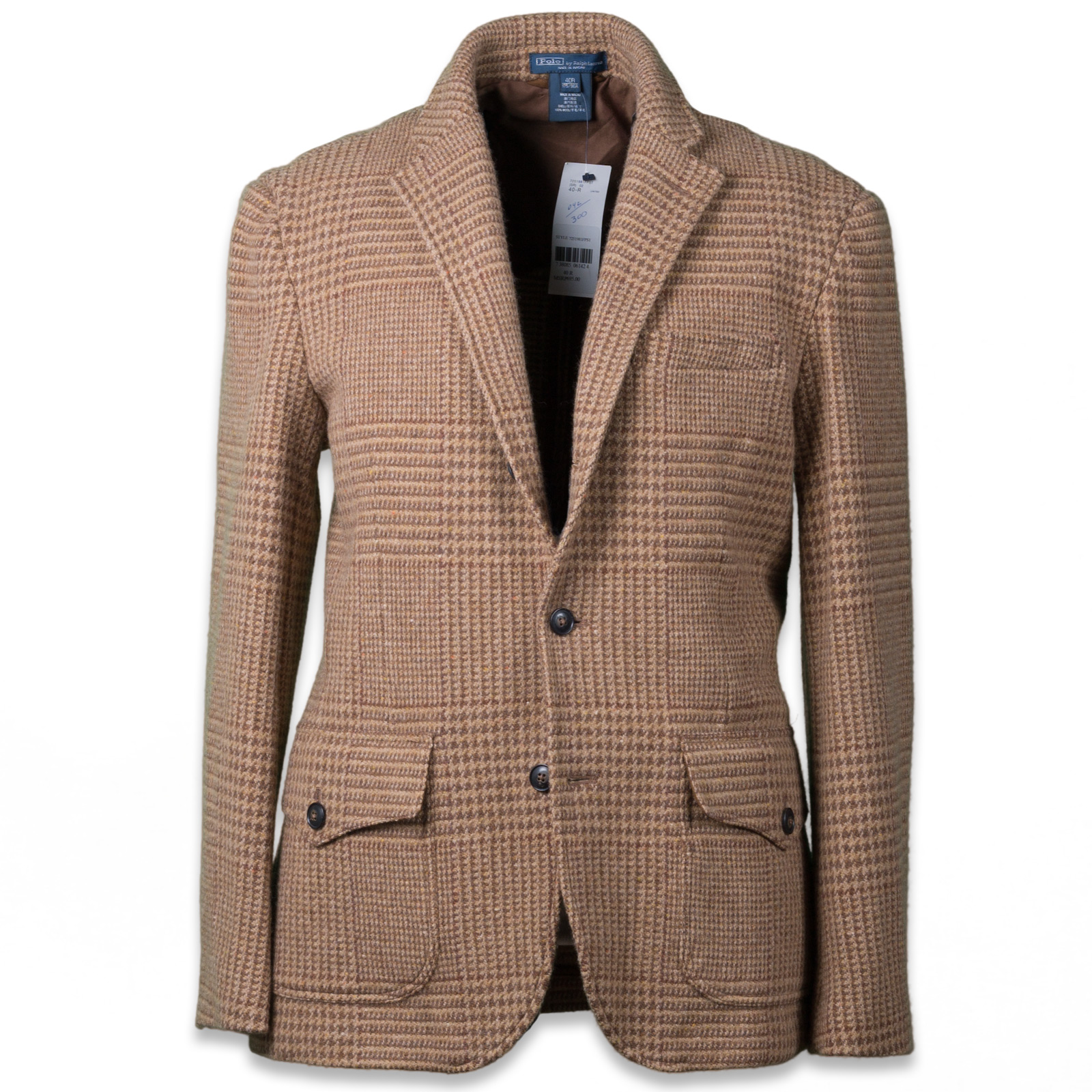
Polo Ralph Lauren sport coat

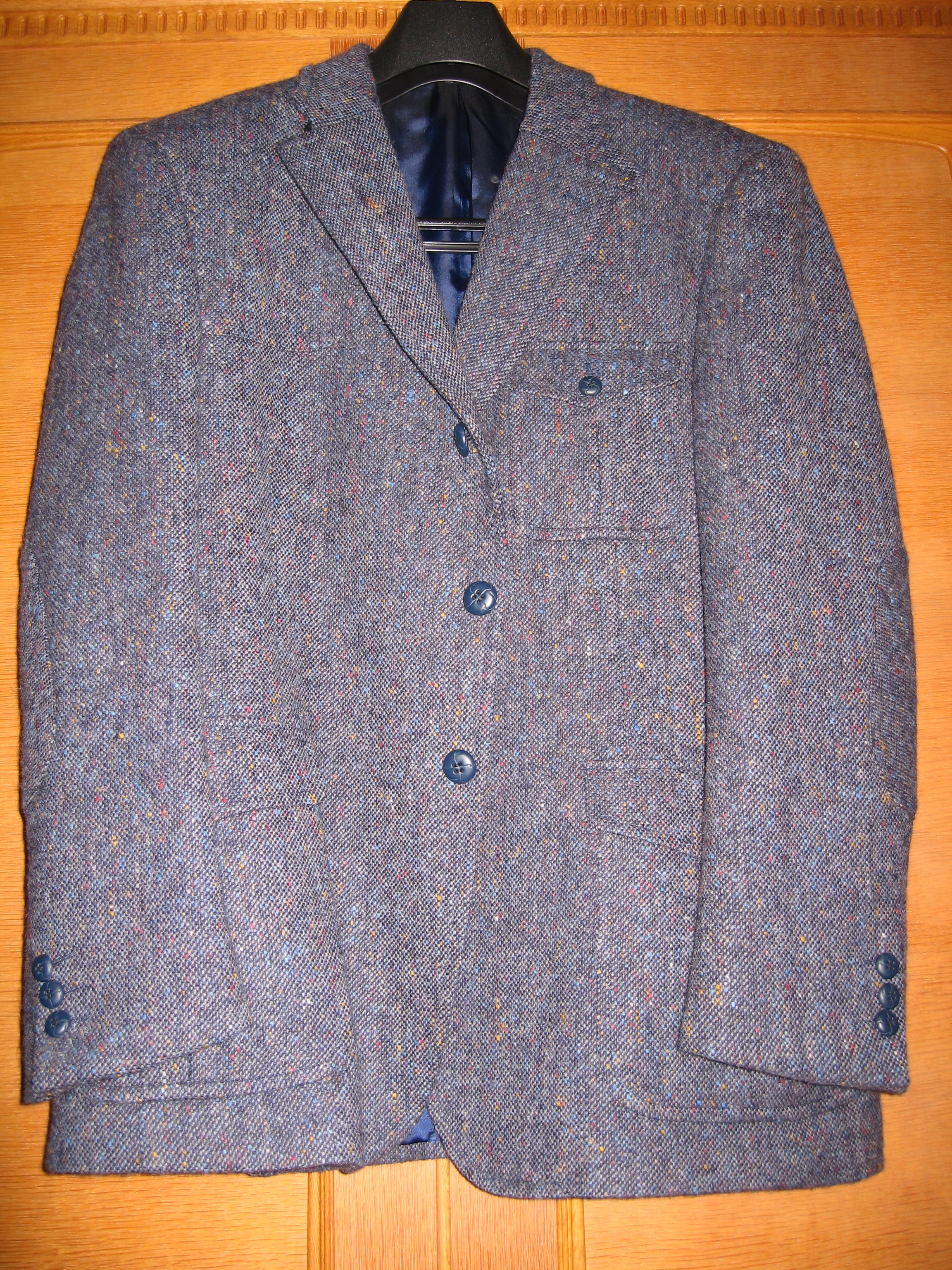
The Norfolk jacket is the oldest form of sports jacket

A sport coat (American English) or sports jacket (British English) is a smart casual lounge jacket with flap pockets designed to be worn on its own without matching trousers. Styles, fabrics, colours and patterns are more varied than in most suits; sturdier and thicker fabrics are commonly used, such as corduroy, hopsack, flannel, linen, and tweed.

Originally, sports coats were worn as appropriate attire for participating in outdoor country sports, such as shooting and riding. With time, they were adopted by those attending outdoor sporting events.

A blazer is similar to a sports coat, but typically made from a solid color or wide vertical stripes. Blazers are often made with metal buttons reflecting their origins in the Royal Navy and the sport of boating, though this is not a strictly defining feature. Blazers also often have patch pockets, unlike sports coats and most suit jackets.

== Types ==
A shooting jacket is a type of sport coat worn, as the name suggests, originally while participating in the sports of shooting or hunting. It usually comes with a leather patch on the front shoulder to prevent recoil wear from the butt of a shotgun or rifle, and frequently has matching leather patches on the elbows.

A hacking jacket is a wool sports coat for casual horseback riding, often of tweed and traditionally 3 buttoned with a single vent.

== Fabric ==
A sports coat or sports jacket comes in a variety of fabrics such as wool, tweed, linen, corduroy and cotton. The most classic style of a sports coat is made from wool, in particular tweed. In Ireland, Donegal tweed is famously made in the Irish County of Donegal and used for sports coats and jackets.

== In popular culture ==
The jacket is mentioned in the title of the 1957 rock and roll hit single "A White Sport Coat (and a Pink Carnation)" by Marty Robbins; the title was later adapted by Jimmy Buffett for his 1973 album A White Sport Coat and a Pink Crustacean.

== See also ==
- Blazer
- Blouson
- British country clothing
- Norfolk jacket
