= Black tie =

Semi-formal Western dress code

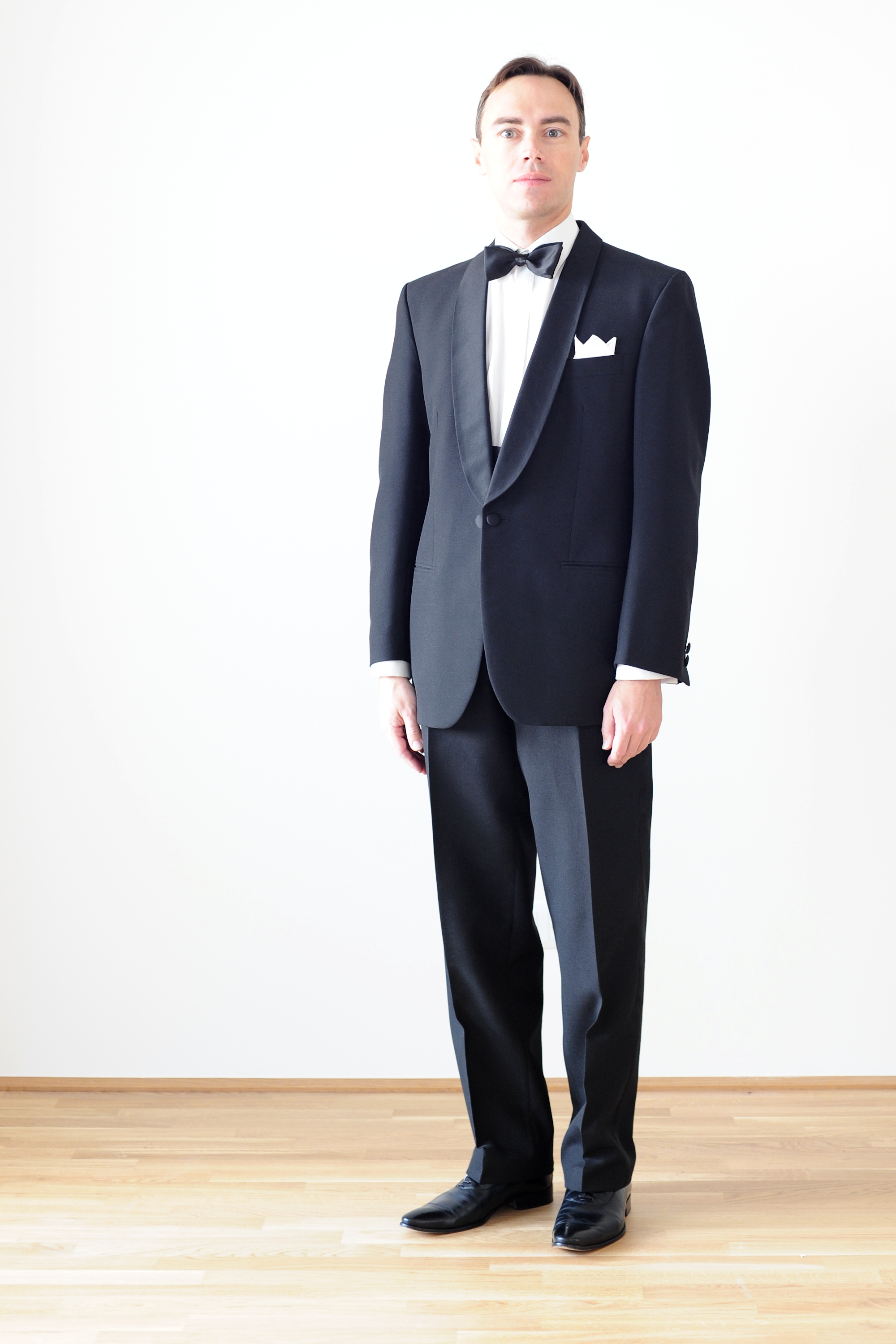
A man wearing a dinner suit with shawl lapels, a cummerbund, a black bow tie, and Oxford shoes

Black tie is a half-dress Western dress code for evening events, originating in British and North American conventions for attire in the 19th century. In British English, the dress code is often referred to synecdochically by its principal element for men, the dinner suit or dinner jacket. In American English, the equivalent term tuxedo (or tux) is common. The dinner suit is a black, midnight blue, or white two- or three-piece suit, distinguished by satin or grosgrain jacket lapels and similar stripes along the outseam of the trousers. It is worn with a white dress shirt with standing or turndown collar and link cuffs, a black bow tie, sometimes an evening waistcoat or a cummerbund, and black patent leather dress shoes or court pumps. Accessories may include a semi-formal homburg, bowler, or boater hat. In Britain, some individuals may rebel from the formal dress code by wearing coloured socks or a bow tie that is not black, such as red. For women, an evening gown or other fashionable evening attire may be worn.

The first dinner jacket is traditionally traced to 1865 on the then Prince of Wales, later King Edward VII (1841–1910). The late 19th century saw gradual introduction of the lounge jacket without tails as a less formal and more comfortable leisure alternative to the frock coat. In many non-English languages, a dinner jacket is known as a "smoking". In American English, its synonym "tuxedo" was derived from the village of Tuxedo Park in New York State, where it was introduced in 1886 following the example of Europeans. Following the counterculture of the 1960s, black tie has increasingly replaced white tie for more formal settings in the United States, along with cultures influenced by American culture.

Traditionally worn only for events after 6 p.m., black tie is less formal than white tie, but more formal than informal or business dress. As semi-formal, black tie is worn for dinner parties (public, fraternities, private) and sometimes even to balls and weddings, although etiquette experts discourage wearing of black tie for weddings. Traditional semi-formal day wear equivalent is black lounge suit. Supplementary semi-formal alternatives may be accepted for black tie: mess dress uniform, religious clothing (such as cassock), folk costumes (such as highland dress), etc.

== Name ==
Dinner jacket in the context of menswear first appeared in the United Kingdom around 1887 and in the United States around 1889. In the 1960s it became associated in the United States with white or coloured jackets specifically. In modern British English, dinner jacket may be abbreviated to simply DJ.

Tuxedo in the context of menswear originated in the United States around 1888. It was named after Tuxedo Park, a Hudson Valley enclave for New York's social elite where it was often seen in its early years. The term was capitalized until the 1930s and traditionally referred only to a white jacket. When the jacket was later paired with its own unique trousers and accessories in the 1900s the term began to be associated with the entire suit. Sometimes it is shortened to "tux".

In a number of European and other languages the style is referred to by the pseudo-anglicism smoking. This generic colloquialism comes from its similarity to the 19th century smoking jacket. In French the dress code may also be called "cravate noire", a term that is sometimes adopted directly into English.

The suit with accompanying accessories is sometimes nicknamed a monkey suit and, since 1918, soup and fish – a term derived from the sort of food thought to be served at black tie dinners.

== History ==
=== British origins in the 19th century ===
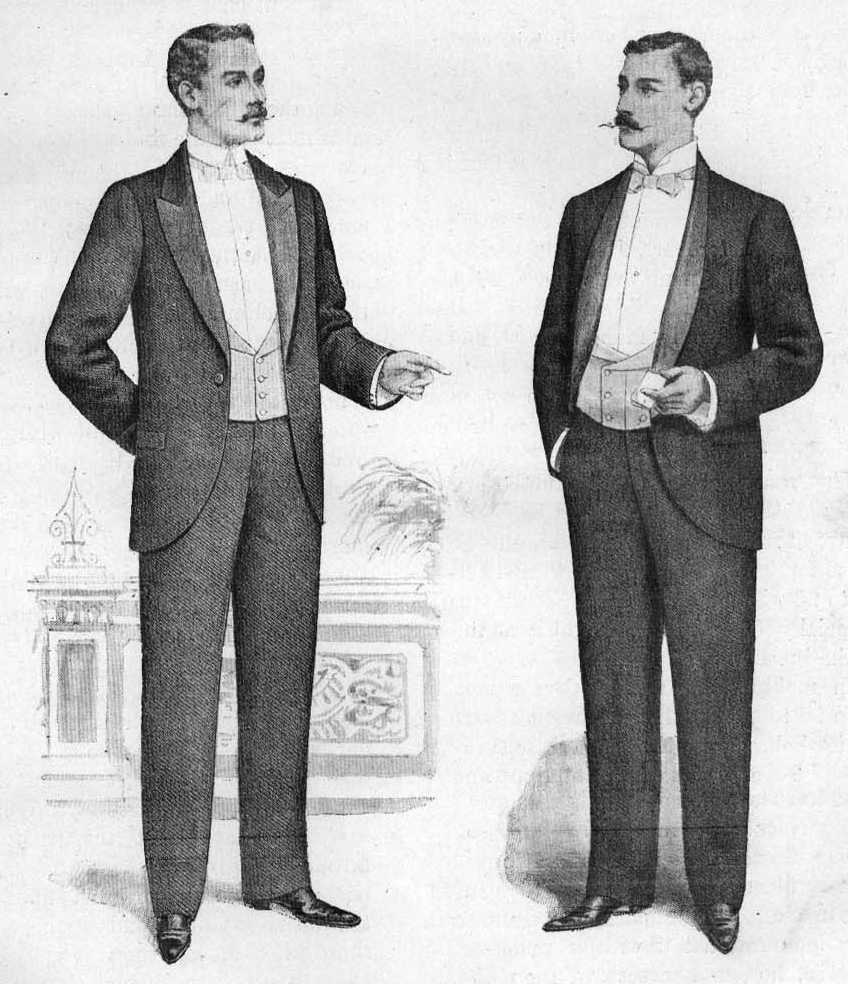
Illustration of British peaked lapel and shawl collar dinner jackets, 1898. As substitutes for tailcoats, dinner jackets were originally worn with full dress accessories, including white waist coat.

In the 1860s, the increasing popularity of outdoor activities among the middle and upper classes of the UK led to a corresponding increase in the popularity of the then casual lounge suit as a country alternative to the more formal day wear frock coat that was traditionally worn in town. Men also sought a similar alternative to the formal evening tailcoat, then known as a "dress coat", worn every evening.

The earliest record of a tailless coat being worn with evening wear is an 1865 midnight blue smoking jacket in silk with matching trousers ordered by the Prince of Wales, later Edward VII of the United Kingdom, from Savile Row tailors Henry Poole & Co. The smoking jacket was tailored for use at Sandringham, the British royal family's informal country estate. Henry Poole never saw his design become known as a dinner jacket or cross the Atlantic and be called a tuxedo over there; he died in 1876 leaving behind a well-respected business to be run by his cousin Samuel Cundey.

Other accounts of the Prince's experimentation appear around 1885, referring variously to "a garment of many colours, such as was worn by our ancestors" and "short garments coming down to the waist and made on the model of the military men's jackets". The suit jacket with tailcoat finishes, as is most commonly known, was first described around the same time and often associated with Cowes, a seaside resort in southern England and centre of British yachting that was closely associated with the Prince. It was originally intended for warm weather use but soon spread to informal or stag winter occasions. As it was simply an evening tailcoat substitute, it was worn with all the same accoutrements as the tailcoat, including the trousers. As such, in these early days, black tie, in contrast to formal white tie, was considered informal wear.

In the following decades of the Victorian era, the style became known as a dinner jacket: a fashionable, formal alternative for the tailcoat which men of the upper classes wore every evening. Thus it was worn with the standard accompaniments for the evening tailcoat at the time: matching trousers, white or black waistcoat, white bow tie, white detachable wing-collar formal shirt, and black formal shoes. Lapels were often faced or edged in silk or satin in varying widths. In comparison with a full dress such as a cutaway tailcoat, etiquette guides declared dinner jacket inappropriate for wear in mixed company, meaning together with ladies.

During the Edwardian era, the practice of wearing a black waistcoat and black bow tie with a dinner jacket became the convention, establishing the basis of the current black tie and white tie dress codes. The dinner jacket was also increasingly accepted at less formal evening occasions such as warm-weather gatherings or intimate dinners with friends.

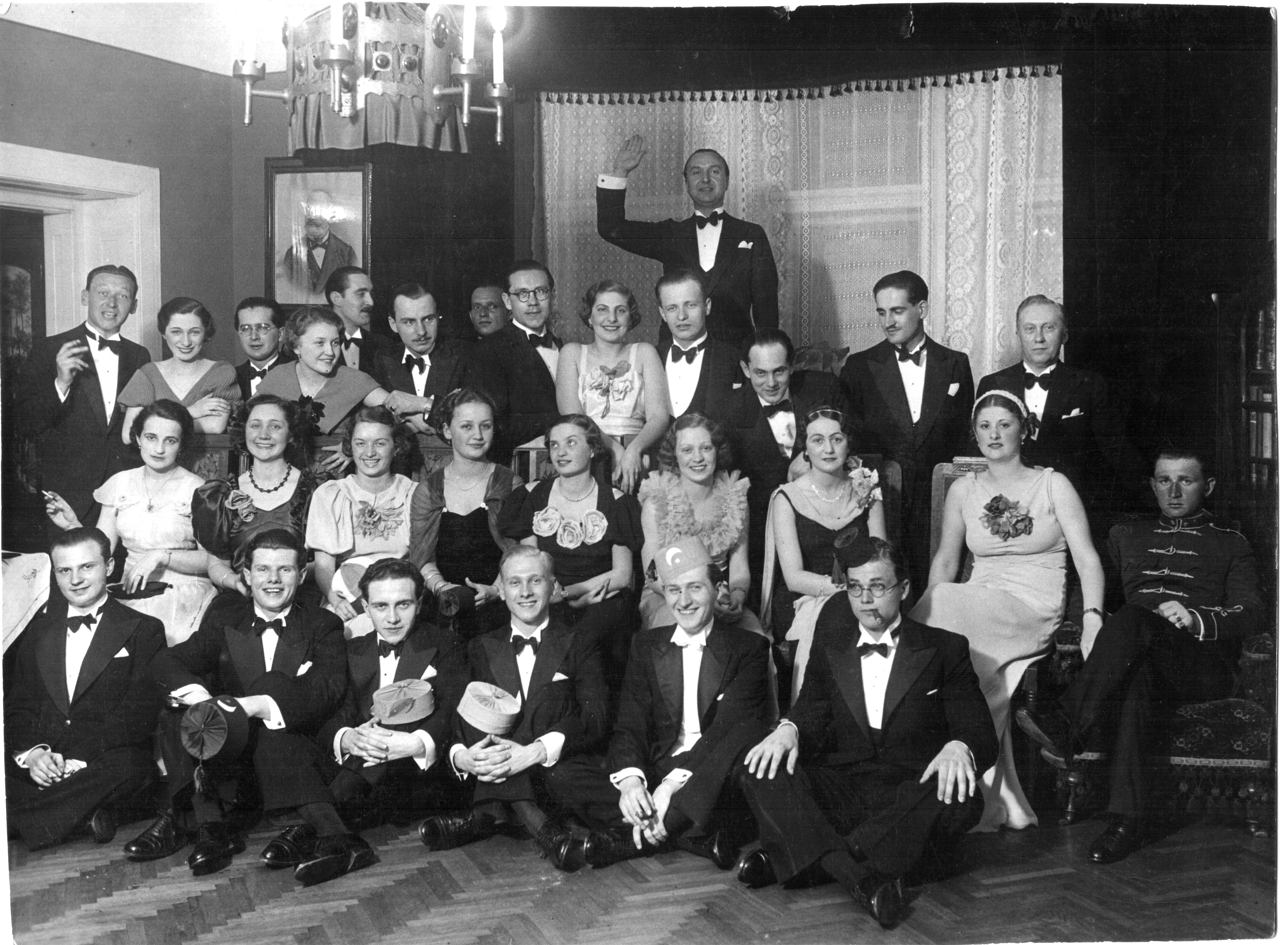
Cocktail party in 1936

After World War I, the dinner jacket became established as a semi-formal evening wear, while the evening tailcoat was limited to the most formal or ceremonial occasions. During this interwar period, double-breasted jackets, turndown-collar shirts and cummerbunds became popular for black tie evenings as white jackets were experimented with in warm weather. Since then, black tie is often referred to as being semi-formal.

In the decades following the World War II, black tie became special occasion attire rather than standard evening wear. In the 1950s, some experimented with coloured and patterned jackets, cummerbunds and bow ties. The 1960s and 1970s saw the colour palette move from muted to bright day-glow and pastel, as well as ruffled-placket shirts as lapels got wider and piping was revived. The 1980s and 1990s saw a return to traditional styles, with black jackets and trousers again becoming nearly universal. Some insist the 21st century has seen increased variation and a relaxation of previous strict standards; midnight blue once again became popular and lapel facings were sometimes reduced to wide edging.

=== Introduction to the United States ===
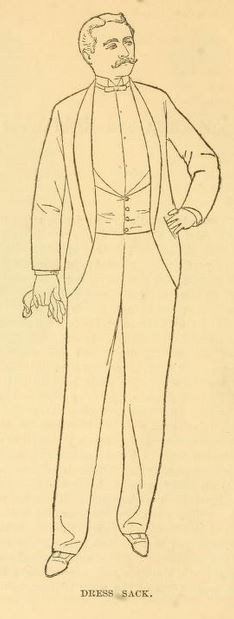
1888 American tuxedo/dinner jacket, sometimes called a dress sack

The earliest references to a dress coat substitute in America are from the summer and fall of 1886 and, like the British references from this time, vary between waist-length mess-jacket style and the conventional suit jacket style. The most famous reference originates from Tuxedo Park, an upstate New York countryside enclave for Manhattan's wealthiest citizens. A son of one of the community's founders, Griswold Lorillard, and his friends were widely reported in society columns for showing up at the club's first Autumn Ball in October 1886 wearing "a tailless dress coat". Although it is not known whether this garment was a mess jacket or a conventional dinner jacket, it has no doubt cemented the tailcoat substitute's association with Tuxedo Park in the mind of the public.

An essay in the Tuxedo Park archives attributes the jacket's importation to America to resident James Brown Potter, a merchant banker who had worked in London for Brown Brothers. However, this claim for Potter cannot be verified through independent sources. Period newspaper accounts indicate that at first the jacket was worn by young mavericks to gatherings considered strictly formal. This led the American establishment to reject it out of hand. It was only by 1888 that polite society accepted its role solely as summer and informal evening substitute, at which point it became very popular.

=== 20th century changes ===
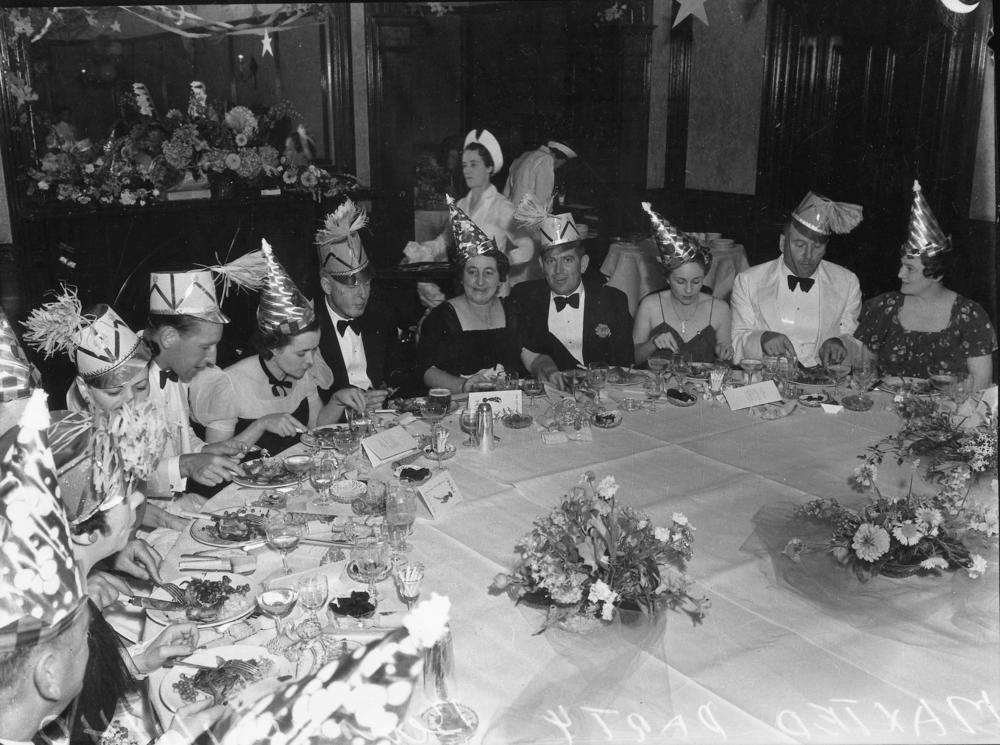
Black tie worn at a dinner party in the 1940s

The earliest dinner jackets were of the same black material as the dress coat with one, two, or no buttons, and a shawl collar faced in satin or ribbed silk. By the turn of the twentieth century, the peaked lapel was equally popular and the one-button model had become standard. When trousers were sold with the jacket they were of the same material. Edwardian dandies often opted for Oxford grey or a very dark blue for their evening wear.

By World War I, the grey option had fallen out of favour but the "midnight blue" alternative became increasingly popular and rivalled black by the mid-1930s. Notch lapels, imported from the ordinary business suit, were a brief vogue in the 1920s. A single stripe of braid covering the outseam on each leg was an occasional variation at first but became standard by the 1930s. At this time double-breasted jackets and white jackets became popular for wear in hot weather.

Colour, texture and pattern became increasingly popular in warm-weather jackets in the 1950s. In the 1960s, these variations became increasingly common regardless of season or climate. Notch lapels were once again a fad. By the 1970s, mass-market retailers began offering white and coloured versions of the entire suit to its rental customers. The 1980s vogue for nostalgic and retro styles returned evening wear to its black tone. Notch lapels returned for good in the 1980s, and in the 1990s dinner jackets increasingly took on other traits of the business suit, such as two- and three-button styling, flap pockets, and centre vents. These trends have continued into the early 21st century, and midnight blue is now once again a popular alternative.

== Composition ==
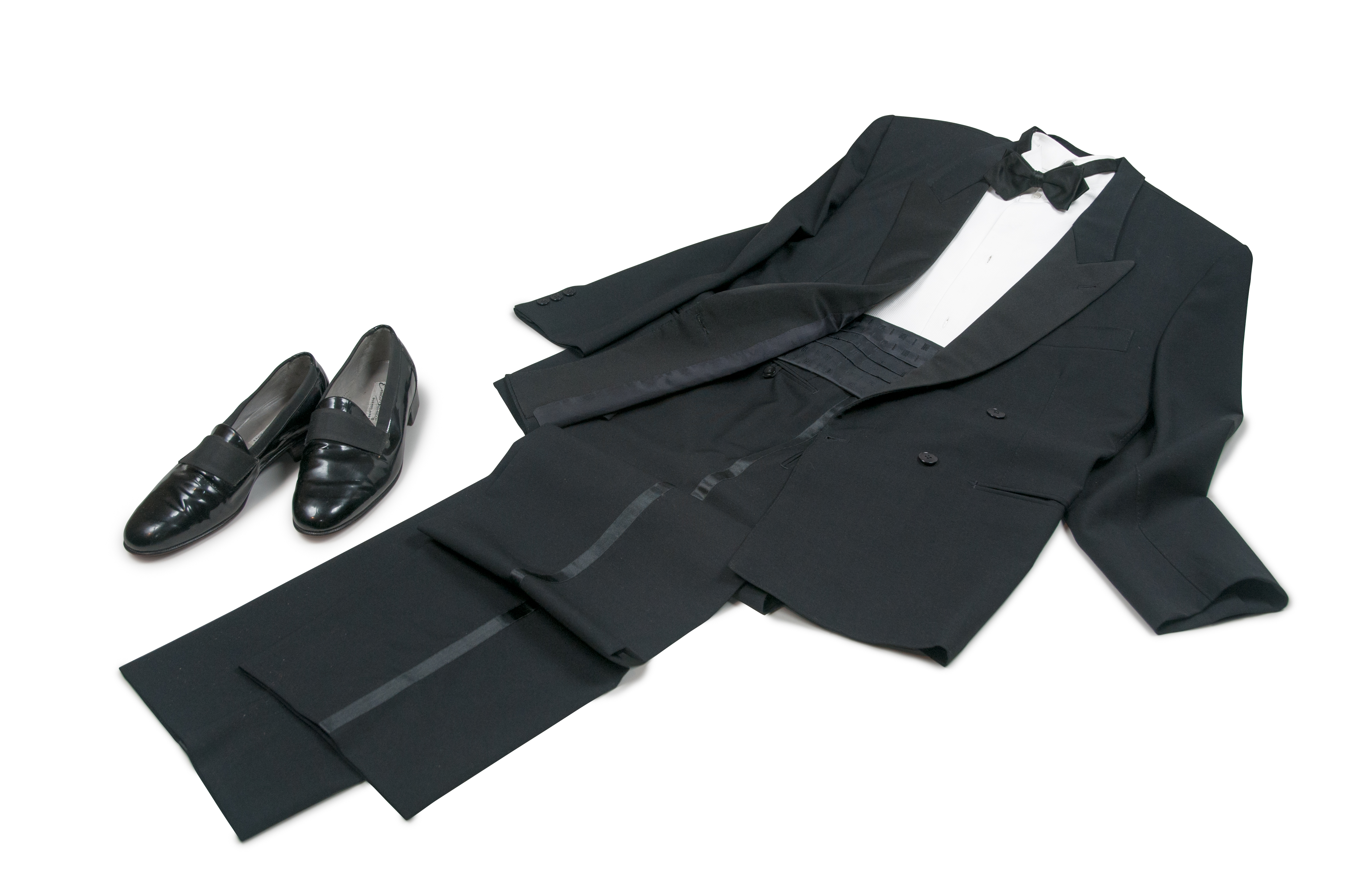
The elements of gentleman's black tie

The dinner suit's accompaniments have also evolved over time. The most traditional interpretations of these elements — dress shirt, low cut waistcoat (in the "V" or "U" shape), black bow tie, oxford dress shoes — are incorporated in the black tie dress code.

Unlike white tie, which is very strictly regulated, black tie ensembles can display more variation. More extensively, the traditional components for men are:

- A dinner jacket, also called a tuxedo jacket in the United States, is primarily made of black or midnight blue wool. Dinner jackets in an off-white colour are also considered appropriate for some occasions, but are traditionally associated with warmer climates and differ from other dinner jackets in that they are self-faced and can be made of fabrics including linen and cotton. Silk Jacket lapels and facings, usually grosgrain or satin, are a defining element of the jacket and can be seen on every type of lapel. The dinner jacket may have a peaked lapel, a shawl lapel, or a notched lapel, with some fashion stylists and writers seeing shawl lapels as less formal and notched lapels as the least formal, despite the fact that they, like peaked and shawl, were used (though somewhat rarely) in some of the early forms of the garment.
- Trousers with a single silk or satin braid covering the outer seams, uncuffed and worn with braces
- A black low-cut waistcoat or a cummerbund
- A white dress shirt, with a marcella or pleated bib being traditional, with double or "French" cuffs and a turndown collar. While the turndown is most appropriately semi-formal, the attached wing collar has been popular with American men since the 1980s. However, many style authorities argue that the attached version now typically offered is insubstantial with minuscule wings and inappropriately paired with soft pleated fronts.
- A black silk bow tie matching the lapel facings
- Shirt studs and cufflinks. Some classic etiquette authorities limit studs to stiff-front marcella shirts only and prescribe pearl buttons for soft-front models instead.
- Black dress socks, usually of silk or fine wool. Some style guides recommend that the socks should come up to the knee.
- Black shoes – traditionally patent leather court shoes or pumps; now often highly polished or patent leather Oxford dress shoes instead, without brogueing

=== Jacket ===
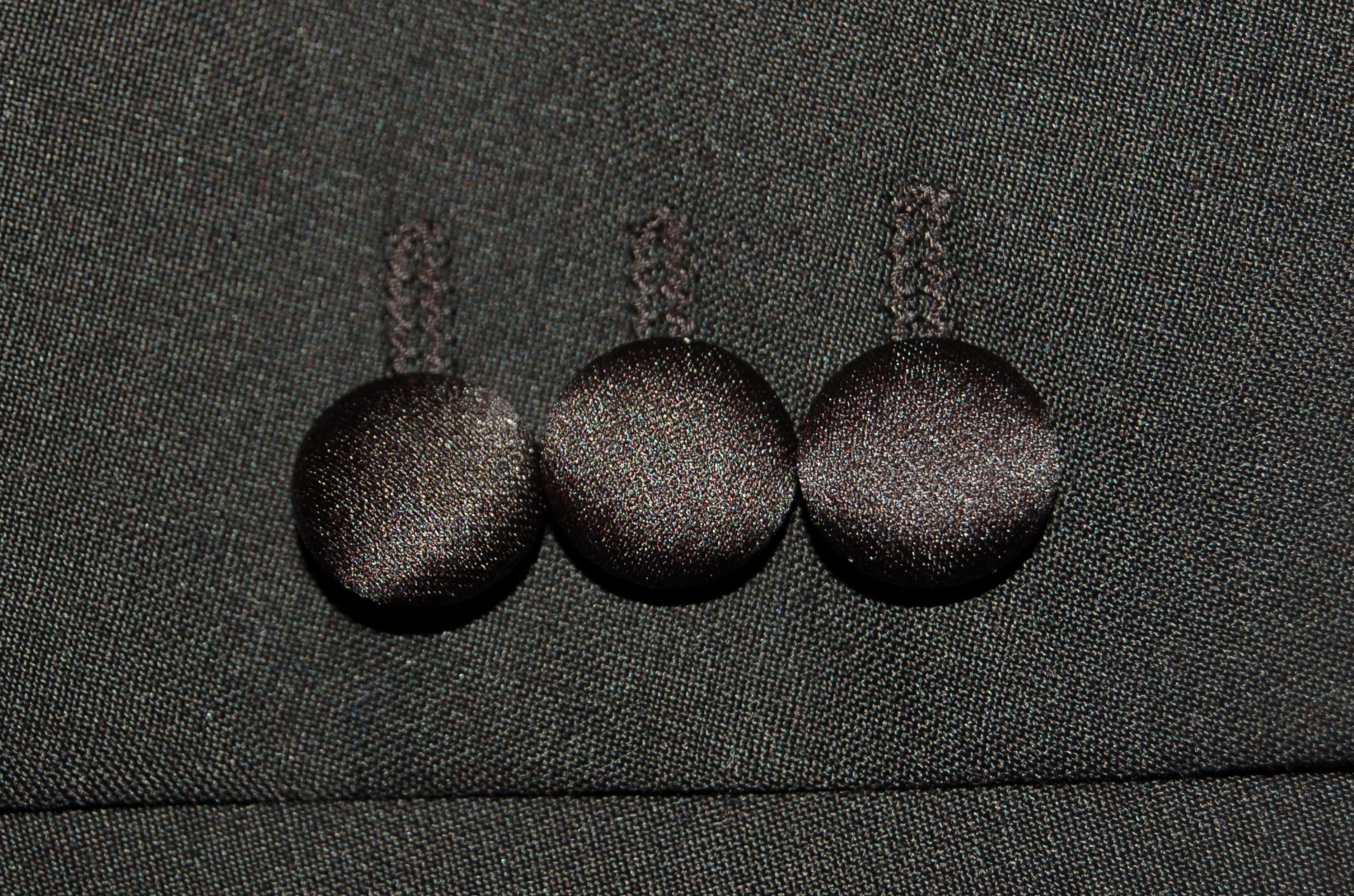
Covered cuff buttons on a dinner jacket

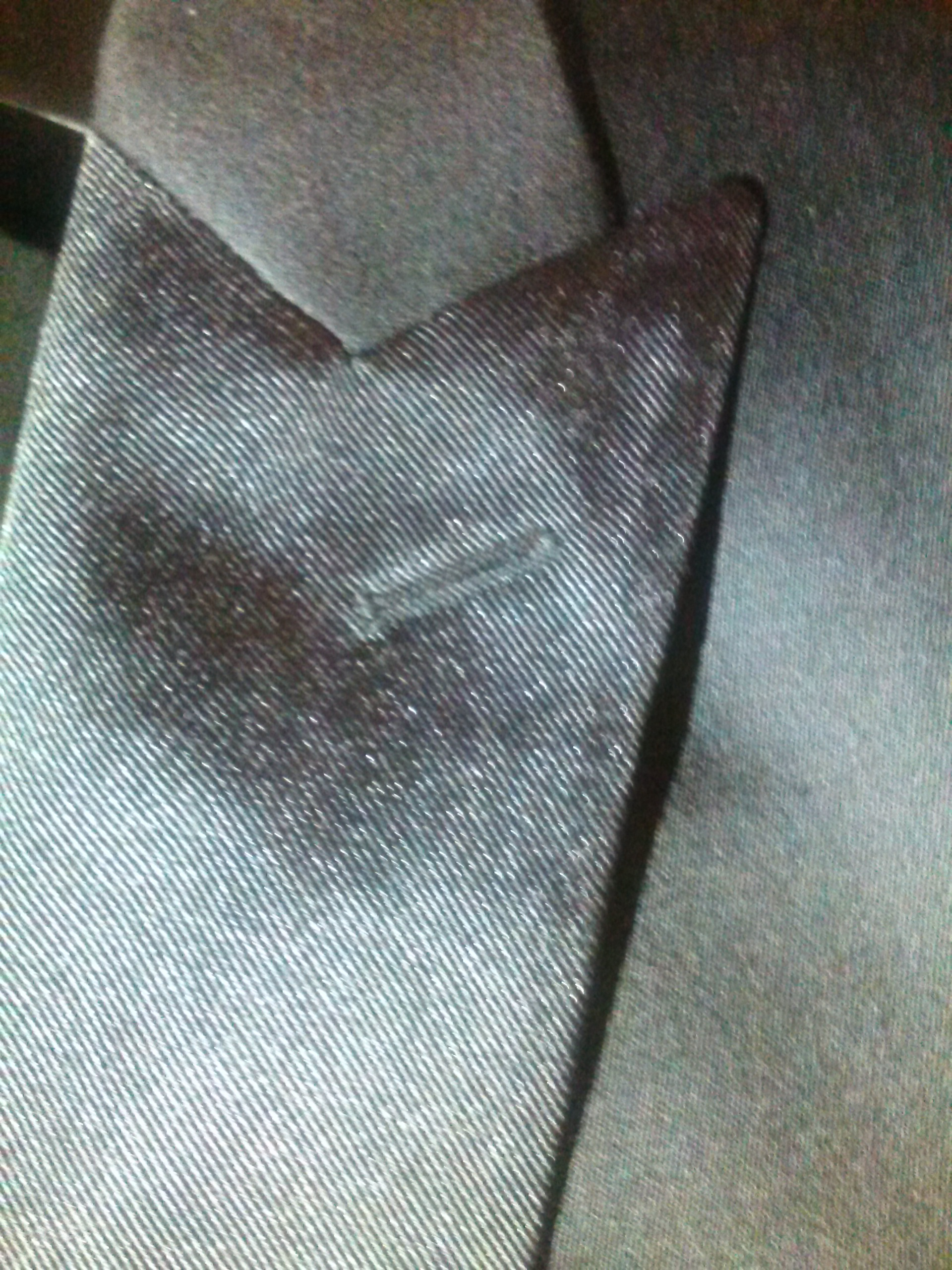
The peak lapel of a dinner jacket featuring a working buttonhole and silk grosgrain facings

The original and most formal model of dinner jacket is the single-breasted model. The typical black tie jacket is single-breasted with one button only, with jetted, or besom, pockets and is of black or midnight blue; usually of wool or a wool-mohair, or wool-polyester blend, although other materials, especially silk, are seen. Although other materials are used, the most appropriate and traditional for the dinner jacket are wool barathea or superfine herringbone. Double-breasted models have become less common, but are generally considered equally appropriate for most black tie occasions. Dinner jackets were commonly ventless before World War I, but in the 21st century come ventless, with side vents, or, less commonly, with centre vents. The ventless style is considered more formal, whilst the centre vent is the least formal. The lapels, traditionally pointed and shawl, are usually faced with silk in either a grosgrain or a satin weave, but can also be silk barathea. A notched lapel is usually considered more appropriate for a business suit than a dinner jacket but is commonly seen on inexpensive off the rack dinner jackets. According to the Black Tie Guide, the peaked lapel and shawl collar are equally authentic and correct, with the latter being slightly less formal. The buttons are covered in similarly coloured material to the main part of the jacket, which would typically be either self-faced or covered with the same material as the lapels. Some higher-end single-breasted jackets, both new and vintage, tend to be fastened with a link front closure which is visually similar to a cufflink; this traditional method of closure is common in the United Kingdom.

Besom welts can be of self fabric or trimmed with the lapel's silk facing, though classic menswear scholar Nicholas Antongiavanni suggests that for the English this latter touch "is a sure sign of hired clothes". The dinner jacket also has a welt breast pocket to hold a pocket handkerchief, which is generally self-faced rather than covered with silk.

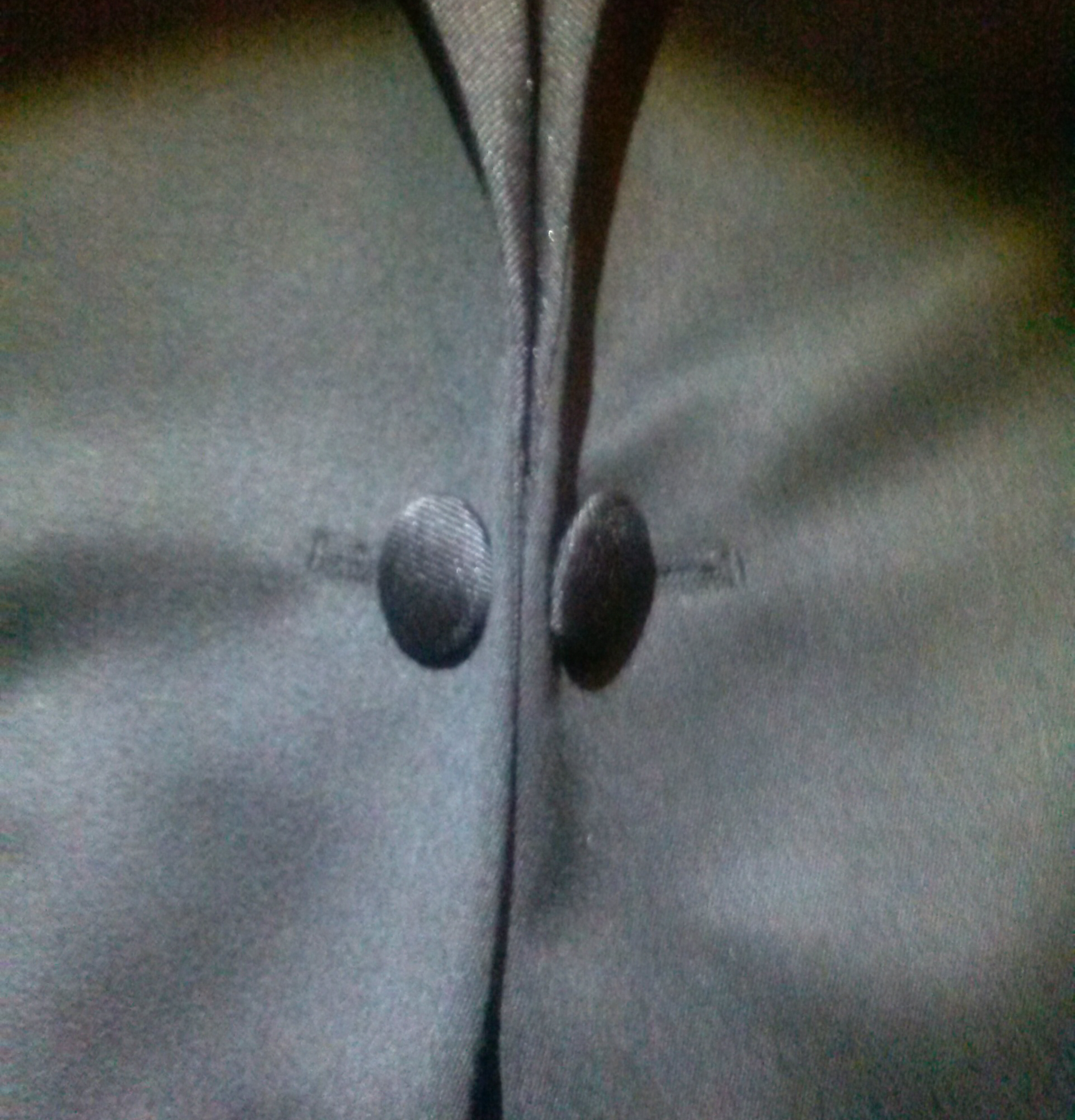
An example of a link front style closure of a dinner jacket, featuring silk grosgrain

Emily Post, a resident of Tuxedo Park, New York, stated in 1909 that "[Tuxedos] can have lapels or be shawl-shaped, in either case they are to have facings of silk, satin or grosgrain". She later republished this statement in her 1922 book Etiquette, adding that only single-breasted jackets are appropriately called tuxedos. There is a fashion movement suggesting that a man's appearance when wearing the wider and higher peak lapel is superior to the narrower notch lapel.

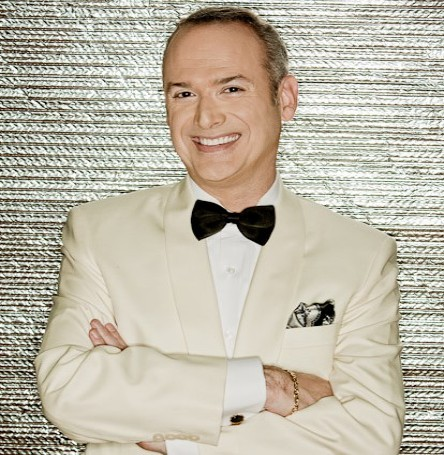
A white dinner jacket

White dinner jackets are often worn in warm climates. They are ivory in colour rather than pure white, and have self-faced lapels (i.e. made of the same fabric as the jacket) rather than silk-faced lapels. They are generally worn with the same types of shirts and accessories as black dinner jackets, though the turndown collar and cummerbund are preferred to the wing collar or waistcoat. Similarly, the shawl lapel is more common in white dinner jackets. In the United Kingdom, the 20th-century etiquette was that white dinner jackets were never worn, even on the hottest day of summer, but were reserved for wear abroad. In the 21st century, white dinner jackets are frequently seen at weddings, formal beach events, and high-school proms, in the United States and at some concerts, famously for instance the Last Night of the Proms, in the United Kingdom. In tropical climates, such as in Imperial Burma, the desert fawn was historically used as the less formal colour. At one time, the civilian mess jacket was also an option in warmer climates.

It is generally considered inappropriate for a man to remove his jacket during a formal social event, but when hot weather and humidity dictate, the ranking man of the royal family or the guest of honour may give men permission by noticeably taking off his jacket. In anticipated hot weather, Red Sea rig is specified in the invitation, although this dress is esoteric in civilian circles, and is particular to certain expatriate communities.

=== Black bow tie ===
Traditionally, the only neckwear appropriate is the black bow tie that is a self-tie and it always matches the lapel facing of the dinner jacket and braiding of the trouser seams. The bow tie is tied using a common shoelace knot, which is also called the bow knot for that reason.

=== Trousers ===
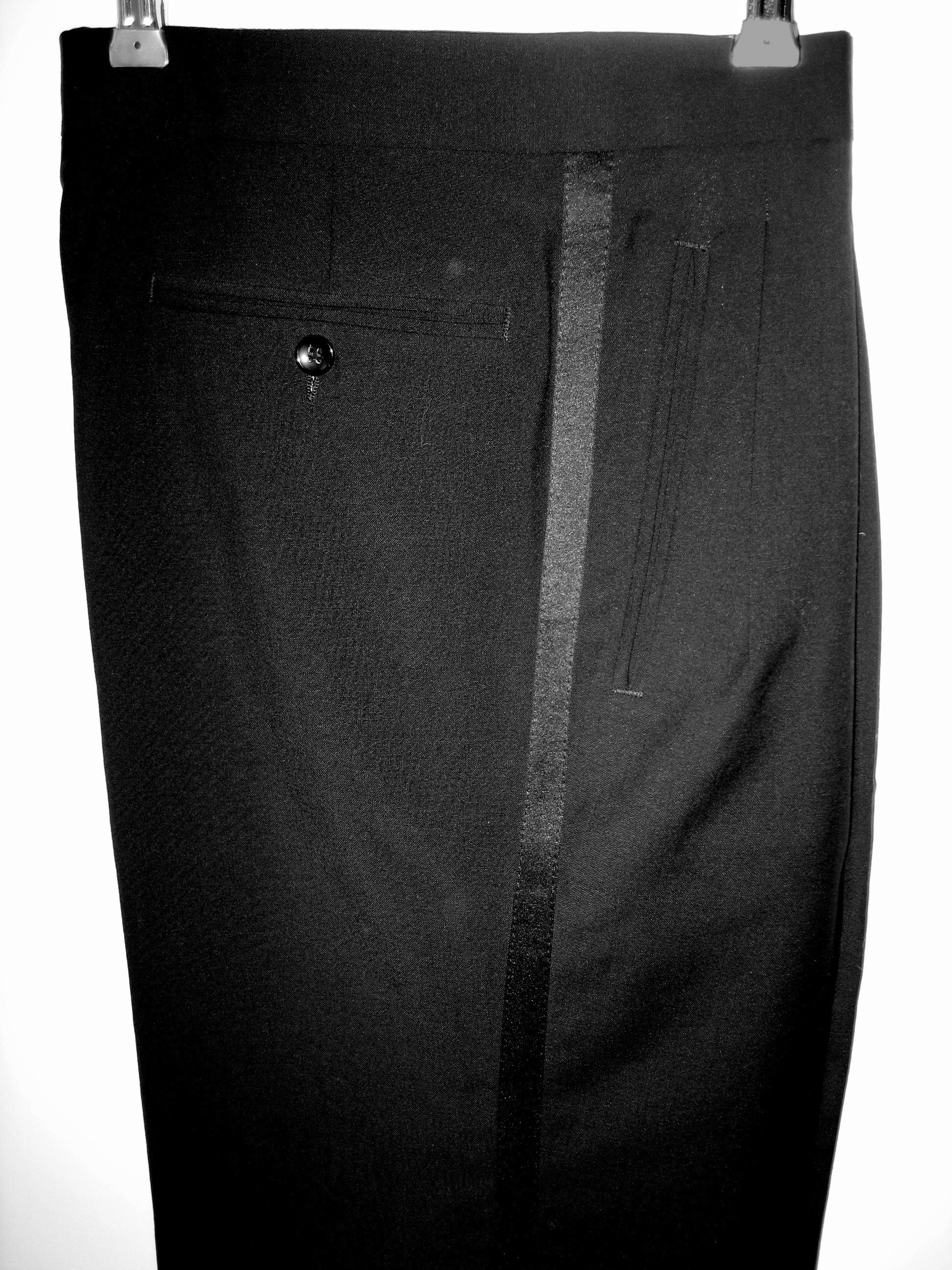
Black tie trousers with a side stripe

Black tie trousers traditionally have no turn-ups, also called cuffs in American English, or belt loops. The outer seams are usually decorated with a single braid of silk or a material that matches or complements the lapel facing. Traditionally, braces, called suspenders in US English, hidden by the waistcoat, are used to support the trousers. Belts are never worn with black tie trousers. Evening trousers may be flat-fronted or pleated, with pleats first coming into fashion in the 1930s. Whilst flat-fronted trousers have become more fashionable, pleated trousers may be considered more comfortable by men who have wider hips and a narrow waist.

=== Waist coverings ===
A waist covering is generally worn as part of a black tie ensemble. Either a low cut waistcoat or cummerbund may be worn, but never both at the same time. Although the English authority Debrett's consider that wearing a waistcoat is smart, they no longer consider either waist covering to be essential. The American authority, The Emily Post Institute, considers them to be an essential component of proper black tie attire. Waist coverings are not matched to wedding theme colours.

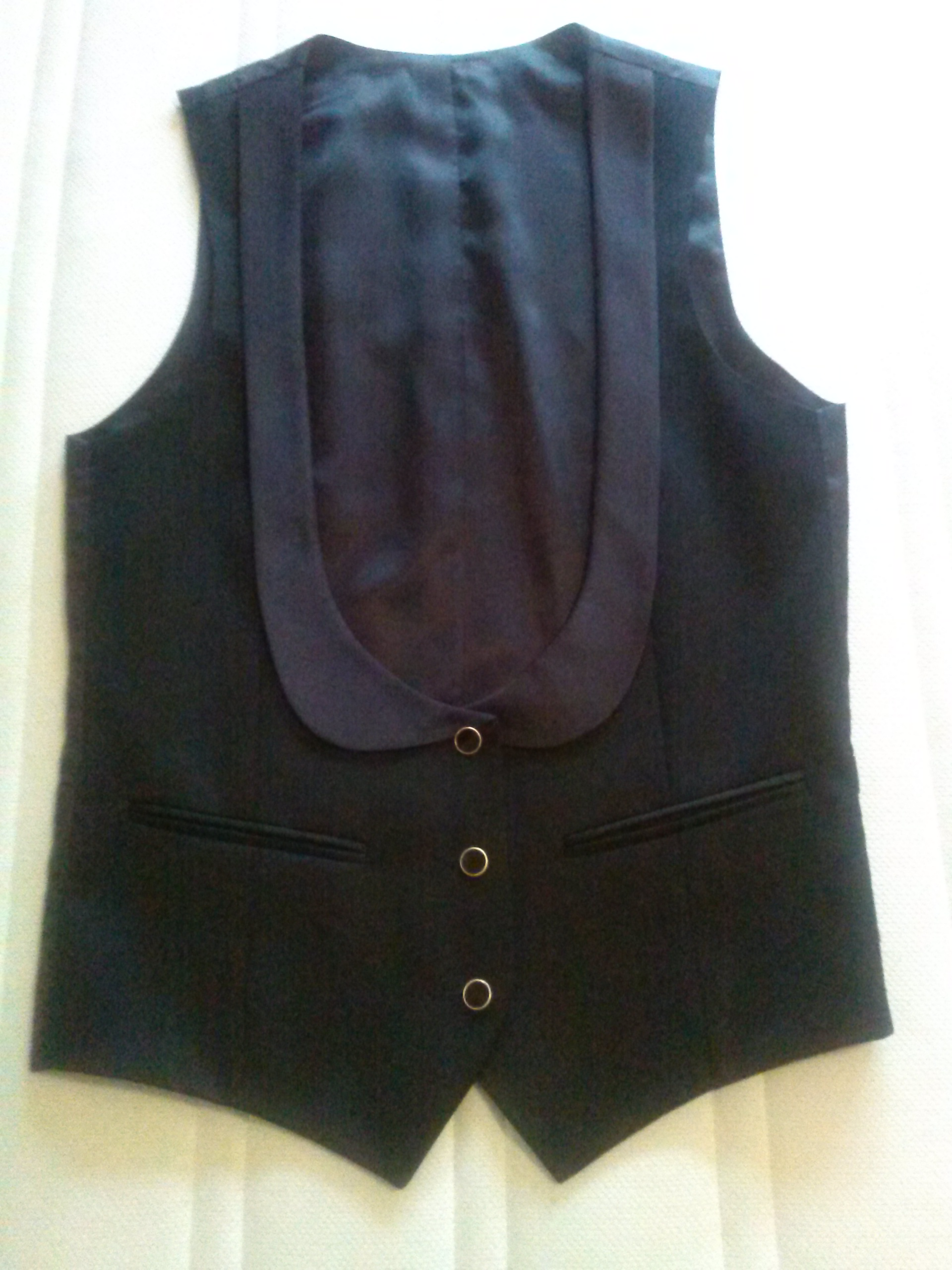
Waistcoat with shawl collar, closed with studs

==== Waistcoat ====
A low cut waistcoat should be worn when wearing a single-breasted coat. The waistcoat plays an important part in black tie's refined minimalism by helping to conceal its working parts by discreetly covering the trousers' exposed waistband and the shirt bosom's bottom edge. Waistcoats come in the 'V' or rarer 'U' shape, in backless or fully backed versions, double- or single-breasted, with or without lapels. Single-breasted styles typically have three buttons, and double-breasted ones three or four rows. Before World War II, while black tie was still gaining acceptance, men would wear a white waistcoat, along with other details now associated primarily with white tie, such as stiff fronted shirts. However, this style, though increasingly viewed as an affectation, is still acceptable in the United States. The waistcoat may be made from either the same fabric as the dinner jacket, as is traditional, or the same silk as the jacket's lapels, which is more popular. When a waistcoat has lapels, they are faced in the same silk as those of the jacket; in this case it is considered more refined if the body is made from the same fabric as the jacket. The buttons may be self-faced or covered in the same silk as the lapels. Vintage waistcoats were sometimes closed with studs made from onyx or mother-of-pearl, which were often surrounded by a setting of silver or gold.

A waistcoat is never worn with a double-breasted jacket. Since this style of jacket is never unbuttoned, the waist of the trousers is never exposed, and therefore does not need to be covered, though before World War II an edge of the waistcoat was often shown between the jacket and shirt.

==== Cummerbund ====
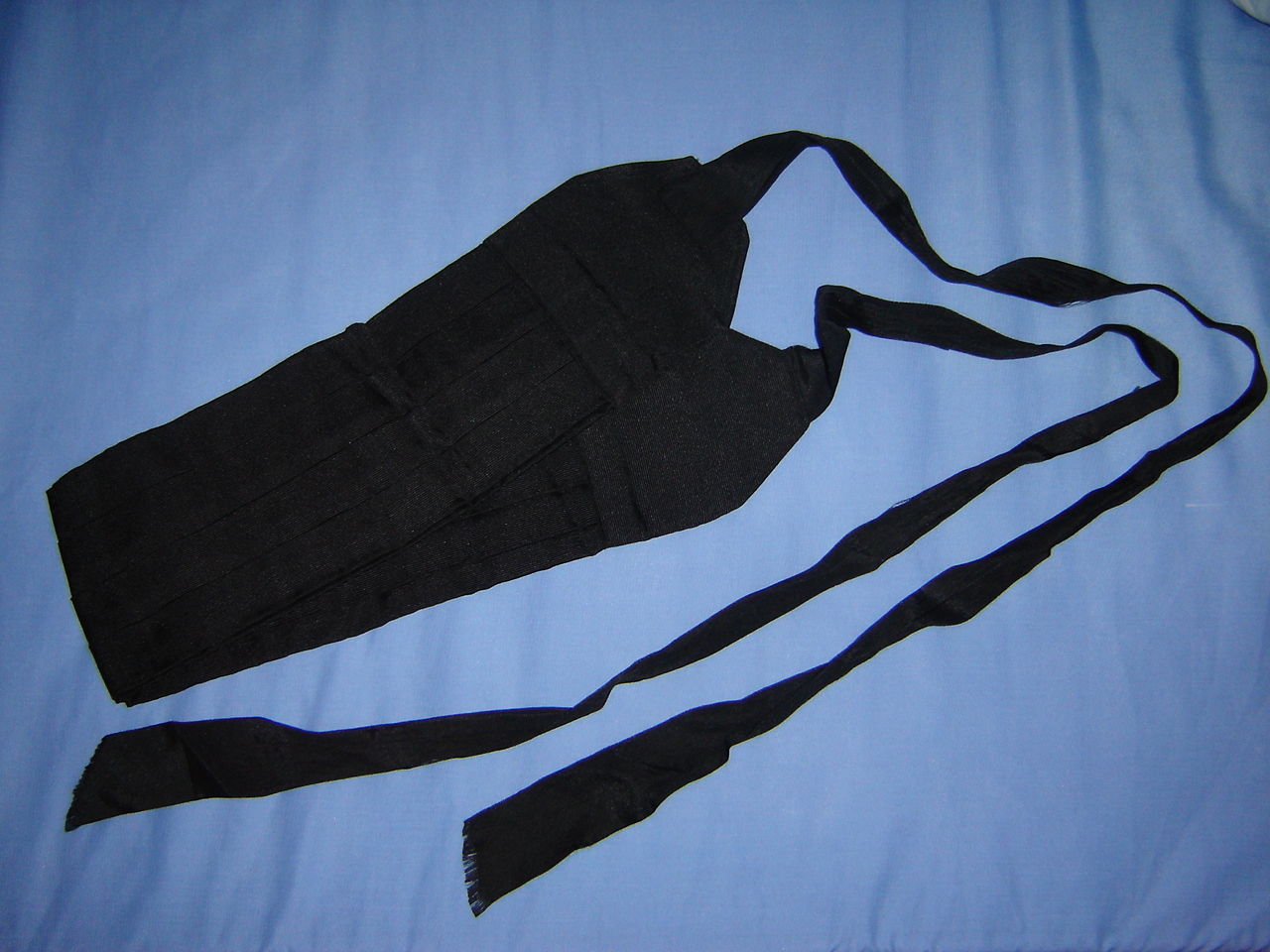
Black ottoman silk cummerbund

A cummerbund may be worn with a dinner jacket in lieu of a waistcoat and, although it is considered slightly less formal, it is equally correct. It looks especially well with a shawl collar dinner jacket but may be worn in conjunction with peak lapels. The material of the cummerbund should be silk satin, grosgrain, also called faille, or barathea to match that of the bow tie. It features upward-facing folds, which were originally used to store theatre or opera tickets, and are now considered to be more decorative than functional. Just like the waistcoat, cummerbunds are not worn with a double-breasted jacket.

As the cummerbund is seen as an extension of the trousers, traditionally it is the same colour (i.e. black). However, the Black Tie Guide endorses deep and rich colours as a tasteful way to introduce some colour into an outfit that is otherwise monochromatic. Bright colours, such as those often worn by members of wedding parties, should be avoided and the bow tie must remain black in any case. Some higher quality models feature a hidden pocket and an elastic loop to fasten to the trousers.

=== Shirt ===
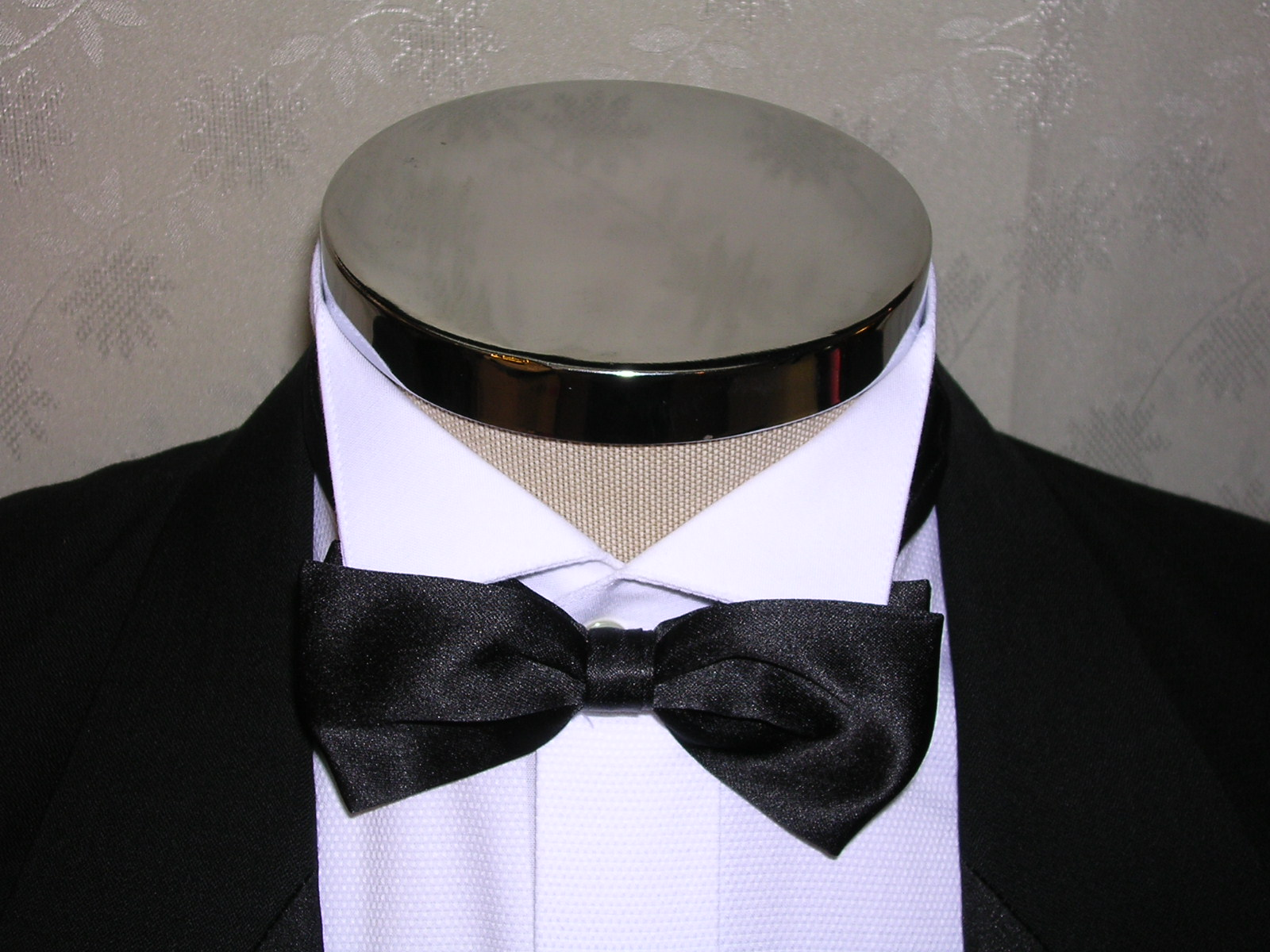
A modern attached wing collar, of the half-collar shape, with longer wings than a typical attached wing collar, and pre-tied bow tie

Dress shirts designed to be worn with black tie are sometimes called "tuxedo shirts" in American English. Traditionally, the shirt is white, has a bibbed front that is either marcella or pleated, a turndown collar, and double, or "french" cuffs. In the early-20th century, a piqué shirt with a detachable wing collar and single cuffs such as is worn with white tie was used, and in the 1960s and 1970s ruffled bibs were popular, but have since become uncommon. The wing collar originally disappeared in black tie after the 1920s when the appropriately semi-formal attached turndown collar shirt became preferred, but it has been popular with American men in a less substantial, attached form since the 1980s. However, many style authorities argue that the wing collar should remain the domain of white tie for aesthetic reasons. Etiquette maven Miss Manners is one of those who feel that while the bow tie's uncovered band is fine in a white-on-white scheme, "gentlemen with their black ties exposed all-around their necks look silly".

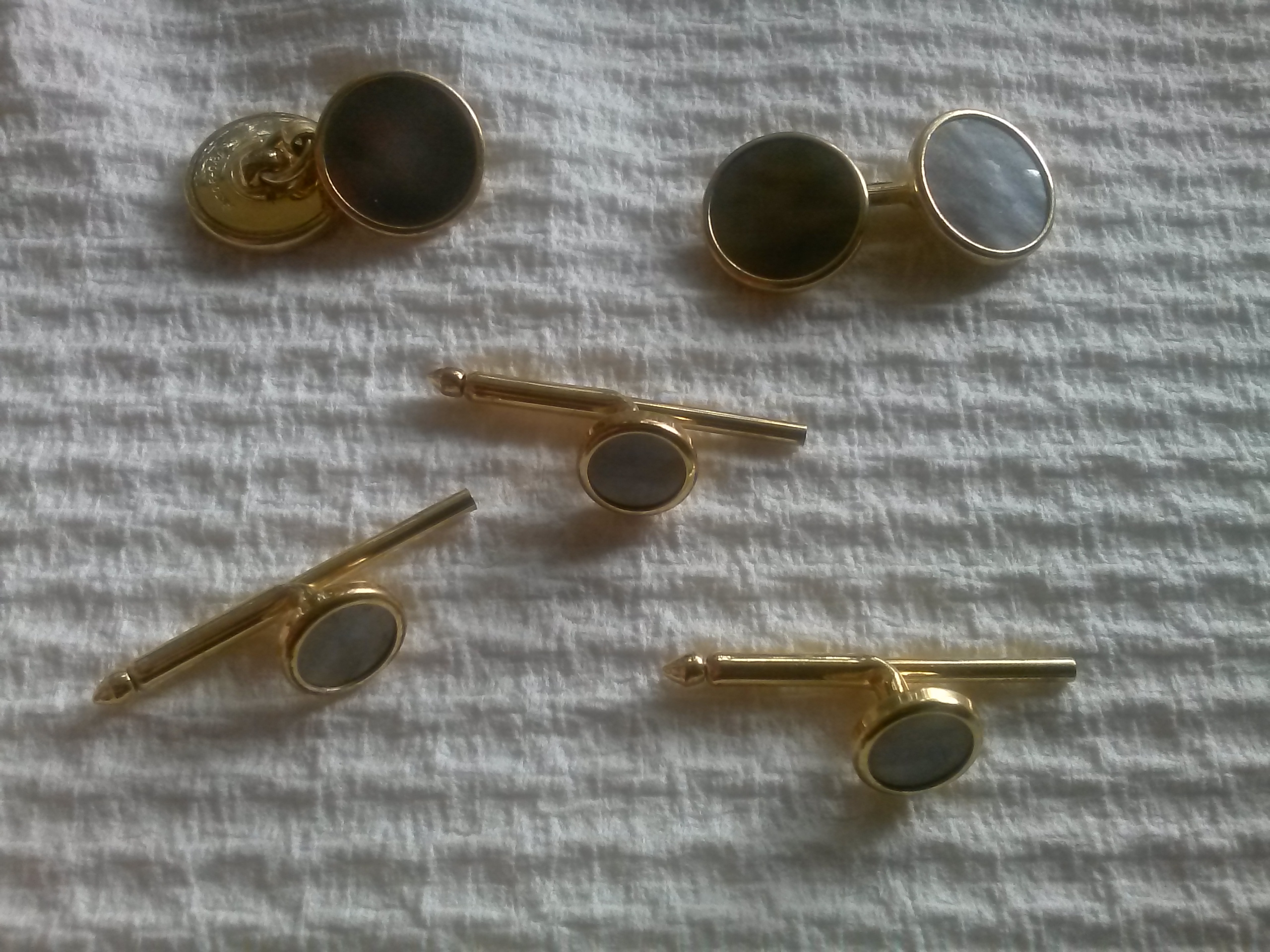
A vintage set of shirt studs and double-sided cufflinks with a smoke mother-of-pearl inlay in a gold setting

Although some style authorities consider the wing collar to be an acceptable option for black tie shirts, they are not worn with double cuffs or a pleated bib, and are better suited to the more formal single-breasted peak lapel jacket. They may feature a bib that is either marcella or starched and include stiff single cuffs secured with cufflinks, made of the same fabric as the bib; this type of shirt is exactly the same as one worn with white tie attire. The collar in this case is tall and stiff, which may be attached or detachable. When a full dress shirt is worn in this fashion, it is accompanied by the white marcella waistcoat ordinarily associated with white tie. Wearing white tie accessories in this manner is considered by many to be an affectation. Debrett's do not endorse the wing collar as being compatible with the black tie dress code.

The more formal marcella version of the shirt fastens with matching shirt studs. These are most commonly in silver or gold settings, featuring onyx or mother-of-pearl; various geometrical shapes are worn (e.g. circles) which are most common for studs, octagons, or rectangles, which are most common for cufflinks. There has been no consistent fashion preference for gold or silver, but studs with mother-of-pearl are more formal and therefore often associated with white tie. The soft-front pleated version of the shirt should be fastened with mother-of-pearl buttons, typically supplied with the shirt on a separate strip of fabric. Alternatively, a fly-front shirt, appropriate with both the marcella and pleated bibs, conceals the placket for a more minimalistic look.

There are several types of cufflinks that may be worn with black tie. The most formal and decorative are the double-panel type, which dress both sides of the cuff and are connected by a chain or link of metal; this model conceals the mechanism by which the cuff is secured. The most common, and least decorative, are the swivel bar type; whilst these are acceptable, they leave the inner side of the cuffs and mechanism exposed which is incongruous with formal dress.

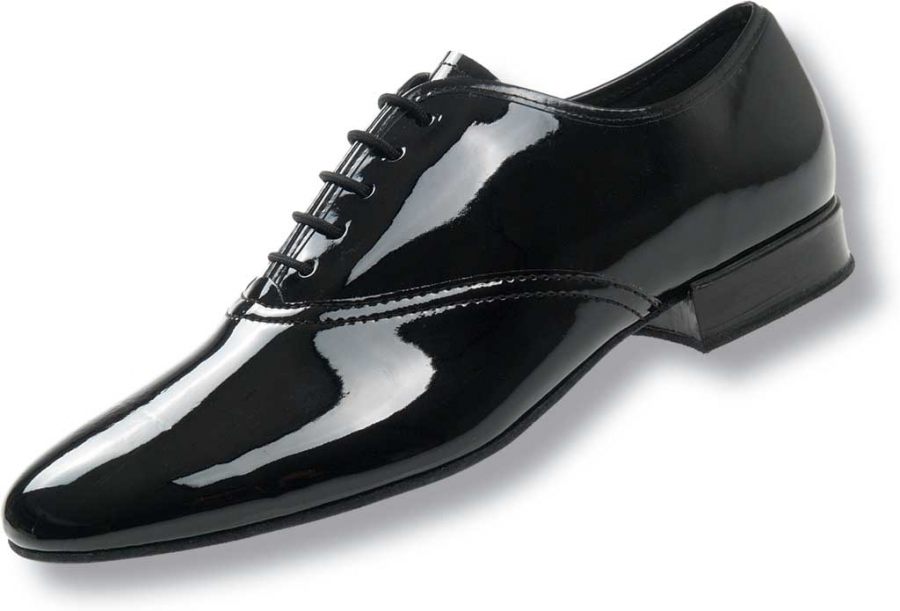
An Oxford shoe in patent leather worn with evening dress or dinner dress

=== Footwear ===
The most formal and traditional shoes are patent leather opera pumps, also called court shoes, decorated with grosgrain bows. The more popular alternative is the black lace-up Oxford shoe, in patent leather or calfskin, with a rounded plain toe. Brogueing or any other decorative patterns should never be seen on black tie footwear. Matte finish pumps are also seen. Shoes are almost invariably black and patent leather is considered more formal than matte finishes while pumps are considered more formal than lace-ups. Generally considered too informal for black tie are shoes with open lacing, such as the Derby shoe, called bluchers in American English. Notable alternatives include the black button boot, primarily of historical interest only, and the monogrammed Albert slipper which was originally worn only at home. Hosiery is black socks made from fine wool or silk.

=== Accessories ===
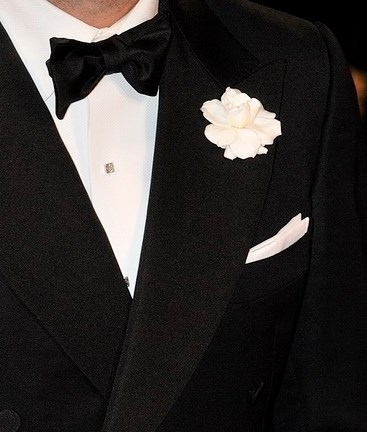
Button hole flower with a white pocket square

Most etiquette and fashion guides of the current decade recommend keeping colour touches and favouring a single colour, usually dark; muted reds, such as maroon, are a traditional choice.

Handkerchief: A handkerchief in linen traditionally, or silk, or cotton is usually worn in the breast pocket. Although precedents for tasteful exceptions exist, pocket squares are normally white, and may not match the waist covering or bow tie.

Boutonnière: A flower may be worn. Red and white carnation, blue cornflower, and rosebud have all been popular at times. In France, the boutonnière is usually a gardenia.

Outerwear: Black tie events do not involve outerwear and coats and gloves are no longer considered part of the dress code. However, etiquette for what to wear in public in transit to and from black tie occasions was stiffer in earlier eras and remain an option: Matching overcoats are usually black, charcoal, or dark blue, and traditionally of the Chesterfield style, or Paletot. A guards coat was also once popular, and a lighter topcoat can be worn in summer. Historically, an Inverness coat was also worn. In the early eras there used to be a specific type of coat, called black tie overcoat: it basically was a below the knee-long chesterfield coat, but imitating a dinner jacket and made of course of heavier fabric. It came in black and was characterized by a one button-stance, in case of single-breasted style, or double-breasted, with pointed lapels: both the button and the lapels were covered in silk. Yet, it soon went out of fashion and had never been very popular: nowadays is nearly impossible to find. Until the mid-20th century, gloves and scarves were always worn, and are still occasionally seen in grey leather and white silk, respectively. White kid gloves, same as for white tie, are also considered a standard.

Hat: The 20th-century standard hat for black tie was a black or midnight blue Homburg in winter, or straw boater in spring and summer. Fedoras were originally regarded as too informal but have become more common. Top hats were originally worn with black tie, but had been reserved to white tie and morning dress from World War I. In the 1960s, it became optional to wear a hat with black tie, while from the 1970s onwards hats became less common.

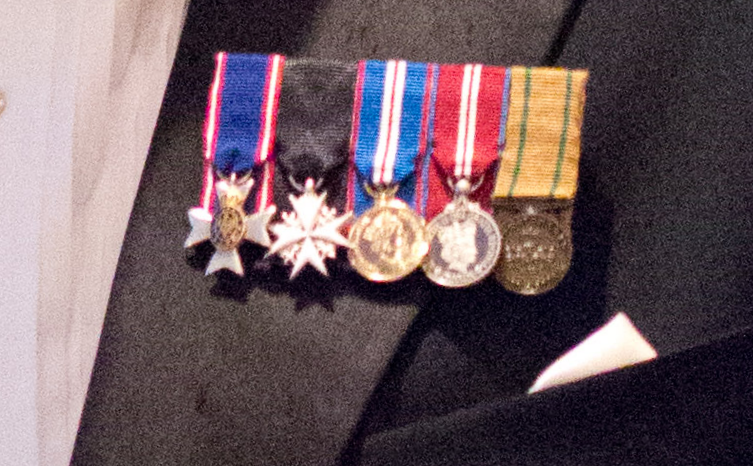
Miniature medals with black tie

Decorations and orders: Military, civil, and organizational decorations are usually worn only to full dress events, generally of formal governmental or diplomatic significance. Miniature orders and awards are typically worn on the left lapel of the jacket, and neck badges, breast stars, and sashes are worn according to country-specific or organizational regulations. Unlike in white tie, where decorations are always permitted, the dress code will usually give some indication when decorations are to be worn with black tie.

Timepiece: Traditionally visible timepieces are not worn with formal evening dress, because timekeeping is not supposed to be considered a priority. Pocket watches are acceptable.

=== Women ===
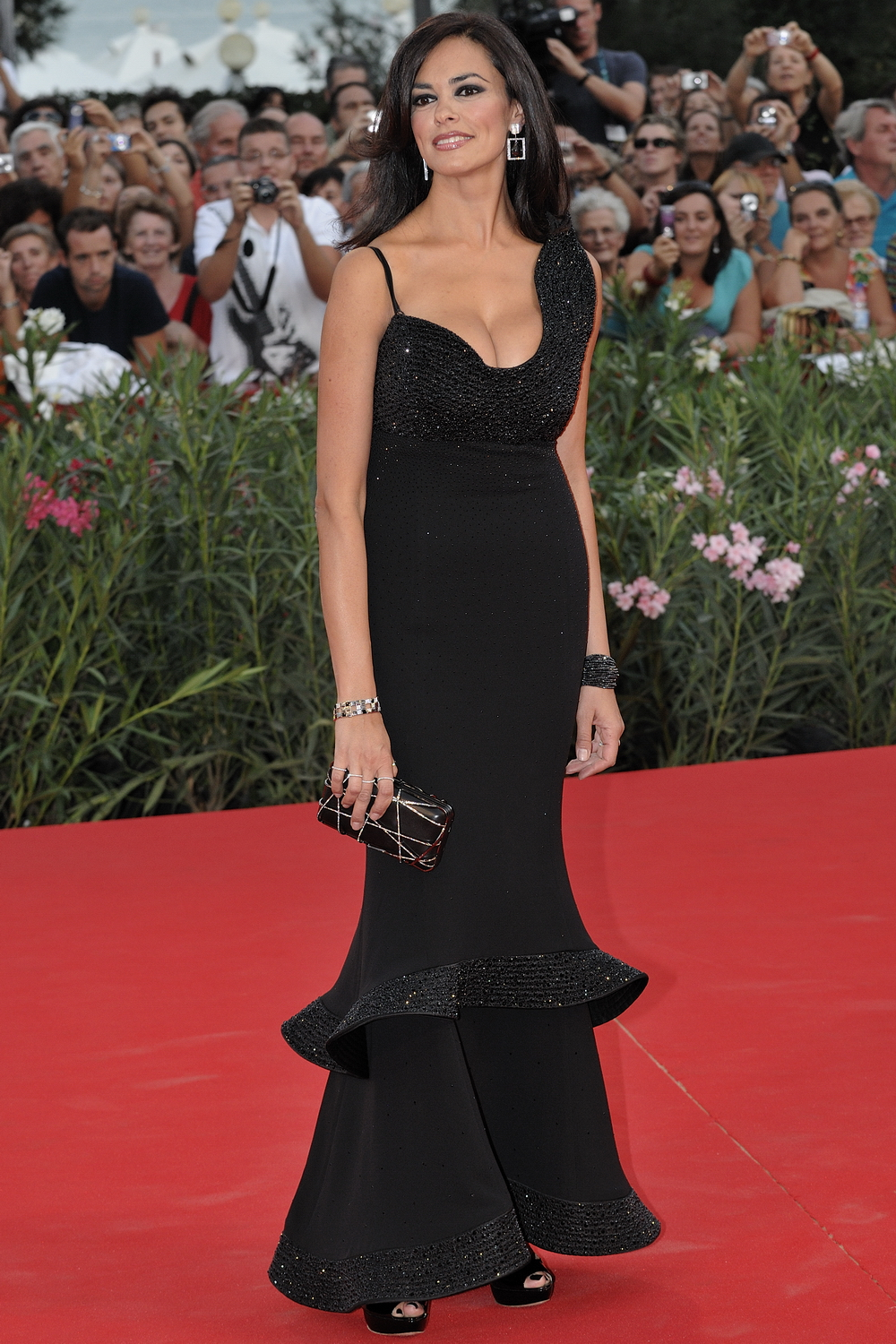
An example of a black evening gown

Women's dress for black tie occasions has varied greatly throughout the years; traditionally it was:

- A dinner length gown at the ankle or tea length gown below mid-calf, which is a sleeveless evening gown, often accompanied by:
  - A wrap or stole and
  - Gloves
- Evening shoes

Other fashionable evening attire may be worn. Unlike the men's standard, the specifics of black tie for women are linked to whatever evening wear is currently in fashion. Today ladies' dress for black tie occasions covers a much wider level of formality ranging from just below the white tie standard to something more informal such as a little black dress. Specifically it can also include:

- Evening shoes and
- A ballgown, evening gown or cocktail dress. Cocktail dresses may be long or moderately short and need not be black.
- In England, evening trousers with a palazzo cut are another acceptable option.

Still, while "black tie" dress code traditionally implies evening dress for women, in 1966 famous couturier Yves Saint Laurent proposed Le Smoking, a dinner suit designed for women. Most initial reactions to the collection were negative. The designer took bits and pieces from both men's suit and women's clothing and combined it with new ideas. As this dinner suit was designed for women, it was different from the normal male dinner suit. The collar was more feminine, as the shape and curve were more subtle. The waistline of the blouse was narrowed to show the body shape, and pants were adjusted to help elongate the leg. It pioneered long, minimalist, androgynous styles for women, as well as the female use of power suits and the pantsuit in modern-day society. Some described Saint Laurent's initiative as empowerment of women by giving them the option to wear clothes that were normally worn by men with influence and power. The suit undoubtedly influenced the decision of women such as Princess Diana to appear in men's black tie in public; the Princess frequently accessorized with masculine accessories such as bow ties, cufflinks and pocket squares. Fashion photography echoes the influence of this suit in shoots that feature androgynous models with slicked-back hair in a mannish three-piece suit, a style that was first popularized in photographs by Helmut Newton. This suit has continued to influence fashion designers' collections through the 2000s.

== Social occasions ==
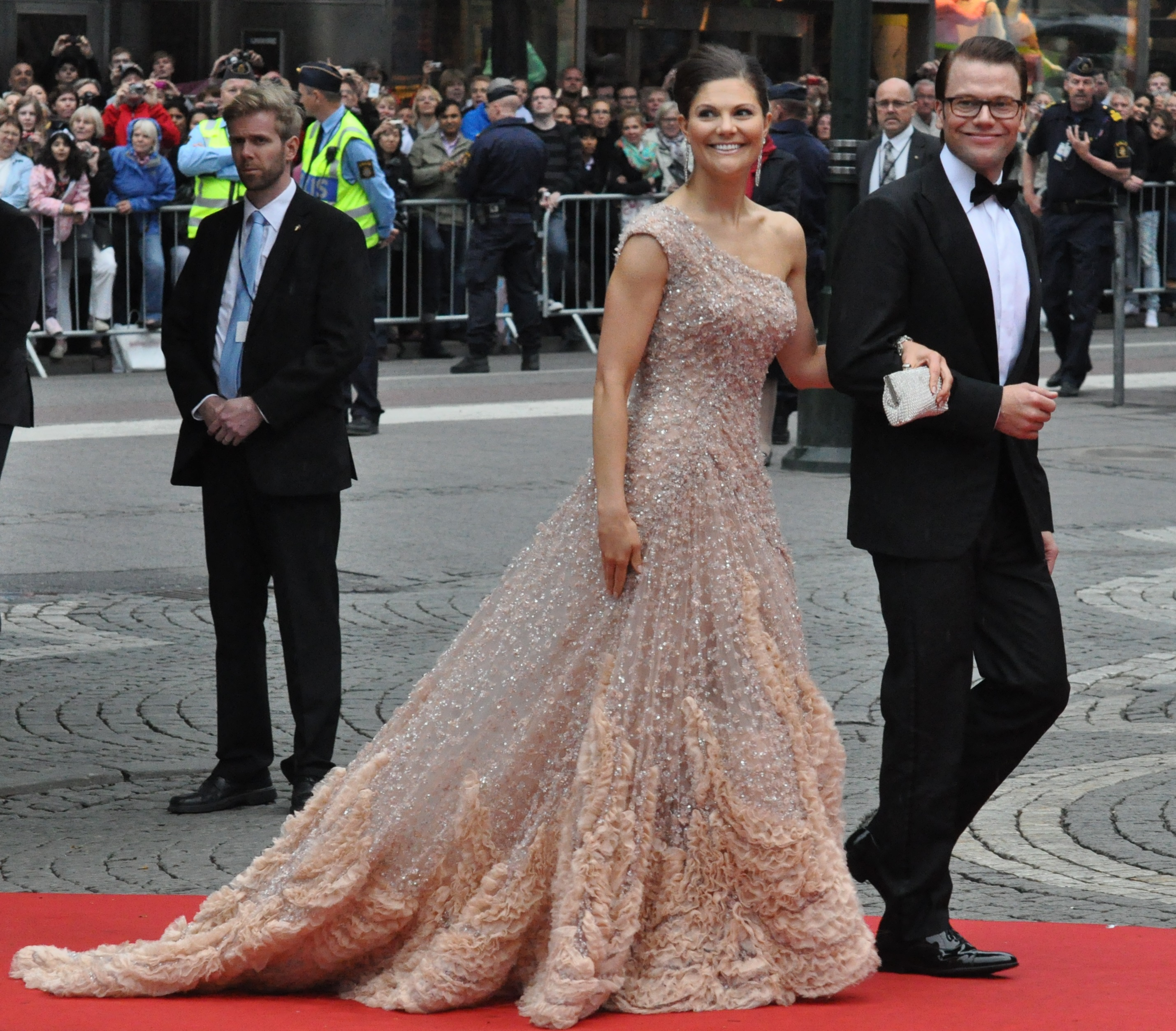
Sweden's Crown Princess Victoria and Prince Daniel Westling arriving at the Riksdag's Black Tie Gala Performance on the eve of their wedding

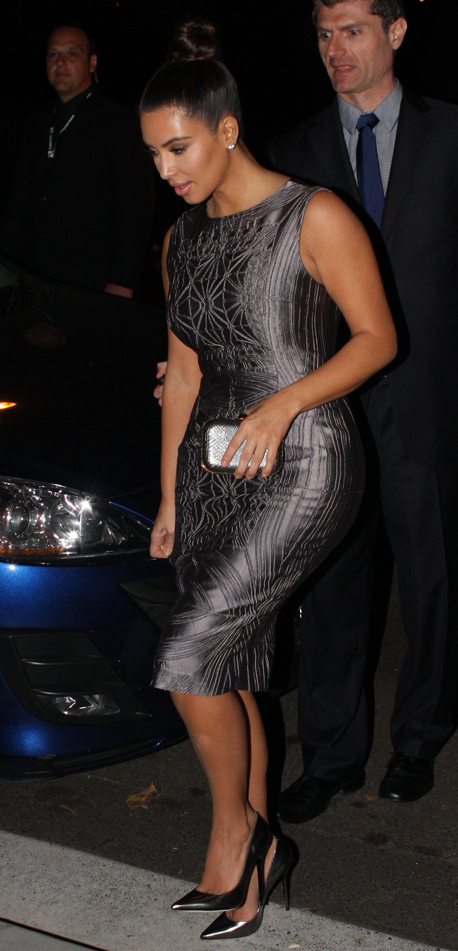
Kim Kardashian wearing a cocktail dress for an evening dinner, Sydney, Australia, 2012

In traditional Western dress codes etiquette black tie is intended for men's evening wear. Traditionally in the 20th century black tie, in contrast to formal white tie, was considered informal. In the 21st century black tie is often referred to as being semi-formal.

Black tie is worn to private and public dinners, balls and parties. At the more formal end of the social spectrum, it has to a large extent replaced the more formal white tie. Once more common, white tie dress code is fairly rare, being reserved for only the most formal occasions. Black tie is traditionally worn only after six o'clock in the evening, or after sundown during winter months. Black tie's rough daytime equivalent is the stroller, which is less formal than morning dress because, as with black tie, it replaces the tailcoat with a lounge coat. Contrary to the trend seen in evening dress, the less formal stroller is now extraordinarily rare, whereas morning dress is still relatively common.

The most popular uses of the dinner suit in the United States in the early 21st century are for balls, galas, proms, cruise ship dinners and weddings. In these circumstances the dinner suit's styling and accessories are most commonly chosen according to the wearer's tastes. Less popular are black tie events, such as gala fundraisers, where men typically wear more traditional dinner suits and accessories as dictated by the dress code. They are also often worn by male musicians at concerts.

As a general rule, boys do not wear dinner jackets much before they are 15 or dress coats before they are about 18.

=== Academia ===
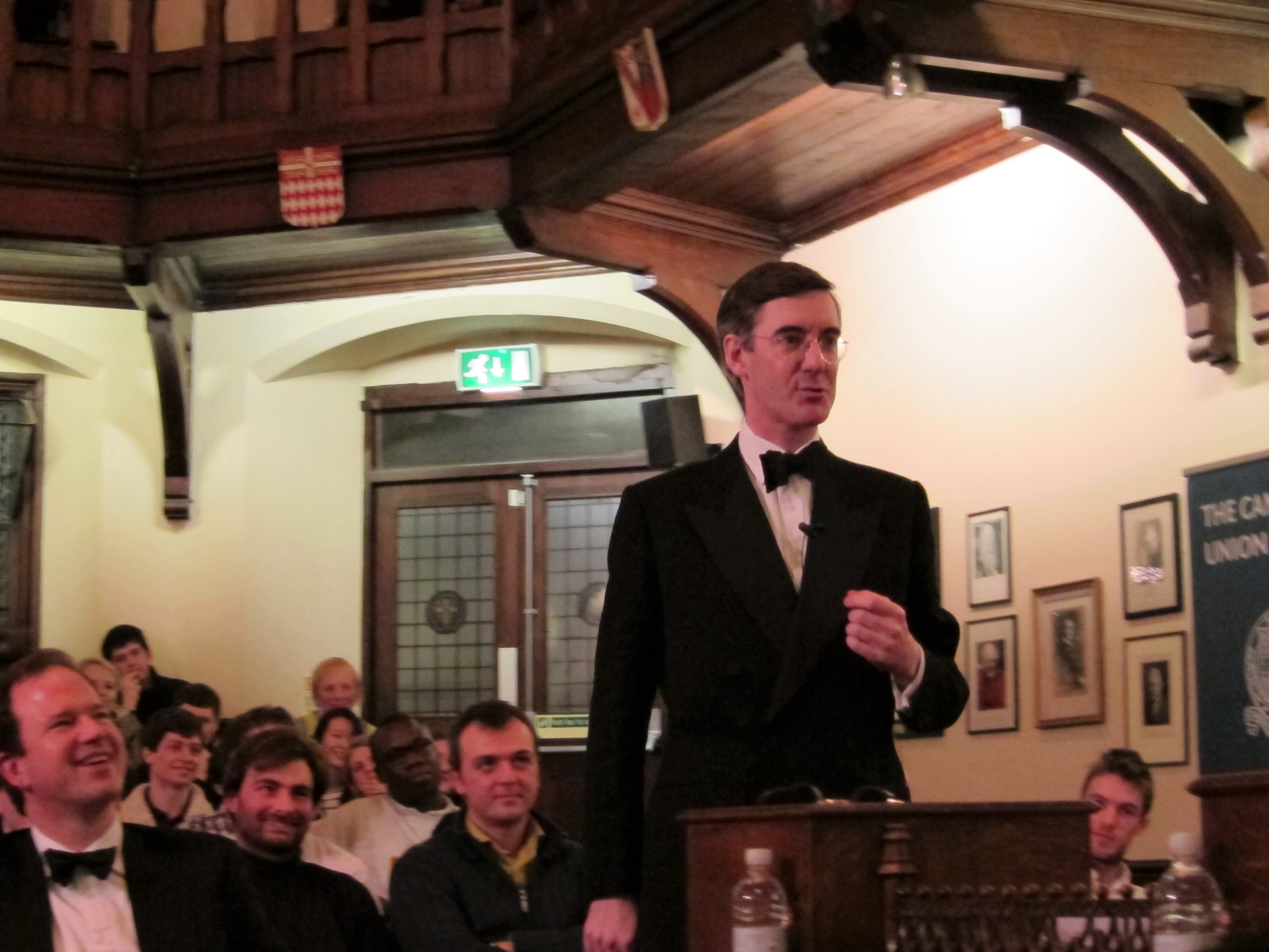
Jacob Rees-Mogg in black tie debating at The Cambridge Union

Some British university debating societies, such as at Oxford, Durham and University College London conduct at least some of their debates in black tie. Notably, the Cambridge Union abolished the long-standing mandatory wearing of black tie at debates in 2002.

The Irish Times hosts an annual black tie debating competition.

Learned societies, such as the British Royal Aeronautical Society, may also follow a similar debate practice.

Black tie dinners and debates are held throughout the academic year by British university Conservative associations, such as those at Oxford, Cambridge, York Tories, and Nottingham.

=== Opera and ballet ===
Historically, white tie was worn for the opera. Since the 20th century, however, black tie has been worn increasingly and today a dark lounge suit is generally acceptable. In the 21st century, many opera houses in the English-speaking world do not stipulate black tie. For example, neither the Royal Opera House nor the Sydney Opera House maintain a black tie dress code. Notwithstanding, black tie is customary at English country house operas, such as during the summer Festival at Glyndebourne.

=== Cruise ships ===
At more formal dinners on cruise ships the dress code will typically be black tie, although a dark lounge suit may be worn as a substitute. In 2013 Cunard, noted for its adherence to formal dress codes, relaxed its dress standards. As of 2015, Cunard requires one of a dinner jacket, a dark suit, formal national dress or military uniform for gentlemen diners on formal evenings. Similarly, the luxury cruise liner, Seabourn, stipulates either a dinner suit or a dark business suit on formal evenings.

=== Weddings ===
Black tie has been increasingly seen in the United States at weddings in place of the traditional morning dress. However, etiquette and clothing experts see the wearing of black tie before 6 p.m. as out of the ordinary. Prior to the late 1930s, black tie was even discouraged as too informal for evening weddings, with Amy Vanderbilt arguing that "no man should ever be caught in a church in a tuxedo". Emily Post would continue to argue in preference of white tie at evening weddings into the 1950s.

In the United Kingdom and the rest of Europe, although a minority accepts black tie at evening wedding receptions, including some Jewish weddings, it is seldom worn at church weddings or civil ceremonies where morning dress or a lounge suit is normally favoured.

Other than that, supplementary alternatives include local variations of white tie etiquette, such as highland dress in Scotland, if neither white tie nor black tie is preferred.

== See also ==
- Suit
- Western dress codes
- White tie
