= Suit jacket =

Man's coat worn with a business or lounge suit

Single and double-breasted jacket

A suit jacket, also called a lounge jacket, dress jacket, lounge coat or suit coat, is a jacket in classic menswear that is part of a suit.

== Single and double-breasted ==
Most single-breasted suit jackets have two or three buttons, and one or four buttons are unusual (except that tuxedo dinner jackets often have only one button). It is rare to find a suit jacket with more than four buttons, although zoot suits can have as many as six or more due to their longer length. There is also variation in the placement and style of buttons, since the button placement is critical to the overall impression of height conveyed by the jacket. The centre or top button will typically line up quite closely with the natural waistline. Double-breasted jackets have only half their outer buttons functional, as the second row is for display only, forcing them to come in pairs. Some rare jackets can have as few as two buttons, and during various periods, for instance the 1960s and 70s, as many as eight were seen. Six buttons are typical, with two to button; the last pair floats above the overlap. The three buttons down each side may in this case be in a straight line (the 'keystone' layout) or more commonly, the top pair is half as far apart again as each pair in the bottom square. A four-button double-breasted jacket usually buttons in a square. The layout of the buttons and the shape of the lapel are co-ordinated in order to direct the eyes of an observer. For example, if the buttons are too low, or the lapel roll too pronounced, the eyes are drawn down from the face, and the waist appears larger.

== Lapels ==
The jacket's lapels can be notched (also called stepped), peaked (pointed), or shawl. Each lapel style carries different connotations, and is worn with different cuts of suit. Notched lapels are the most common of the three and are usually only found on single-breasted jackets. They are distinguished by a 75 to 90 degree 'notch' at the point where the lapel meets the collar. Peaked lapels have sharp edges which point upward towards the shoulders. Double-breasted jackets usually have peaked lapels, although peaked lapels may be found on single breasted jackets as well. The ability to properly cut peak lapels on a single-breasted suit is one of the most challenging tailoring tasks, even for very experienced tailors. Shawl lapels are a style derived from the Victorian informal evening wear, and as such are not normally seen on suit jackets except for tuxedos or dinner suits.

Notched lapel

Peaked lapel

Shawl lapel

The width of the lapel is a varying aspect of suits, and has changed over the years. The 1930s and 1970s featured exceptionally wide lapels, whereas during the late 1950s and most of the 1960s suits with very narrow lapels—often only about an inch wide—were in fashion. The 1980s saw mid-size lapels with a low gorge (the point on the jacket that forms the notch or peak between the collar and front lapel).

Lapels also have a buttonhole, intended to hold a boutonnière, a decorative flower. These are now only commonly seen at more formal events. Usually double-breasted suits have one hole on each lapel (with a flower just on the left), while single-breasted suits have just one on the left.

== Pockets ==
Most jackets have a variety of inner pockets, and two main outer pockets, which are generally either patch pockets, flap pockets, or jetted (besom) pockets. The patch pocket is, with its single extra piece of cloth sewn directly onto the front of the jacket, a sporting option, sometimes seen on summer linen suits, or other informal styles. The flap pocket is standard for side pockets, and has an extra lined flap of matching fabric covering the top of the pocket. A jetted pocket is most formal, with a small strip of fabric taping the top and bottom of the slit for the pocket. This style is most often on seen on formalwear, such as a dinner jacket.

A breast pocket is usually found at the left side, where a pocket square or handkerchief can be displayed.

In addition to the standard two outer pockets and breast pocket, some suits have a fourth, the ticket pocket, usually located just above the right pocket and roughly half as wide. While this was originally exclusively a feature of country suits, used for conveniently storing a train ticket, it is now seen on some town suits. Another country feature also worn sometimes in cities is a pair of hacking pockets, which are similar to normal ones, but slanted; this was originally designed to make the pockets easier to open on horseback while hacking.

== Sleeves ==
Suit jackets in all styles typically have three or four buttons on each cuff, which are often purely decorative (the sleeve is usually sewn closed and cannot be unbuttoned to open). Although the sleeve buttons usually cannot be undone, the stitching is such that it appears they could. Functional cuff buttons may be found on high-end or bespoke suits; this feature is called a surgeon's cuff or working button holes (U.S.). Some wearers leave these buttons undone to reveal that they can afford a bespoke suit. A "cuffed sleeve" has an extra length of fabric folded back over the arm, or some piping or stitching above the buttons to allude to the edge of a cuff. This was popular in the Edwardian era, as a feature of formalwear such as frock coats carried over to informal wear, but is now rare.

== Vents ==
Sewing Menswear--Jackets; US. Dept. of Agriculture

A vent is a slit in the bottom rear (the tail) of the jacket. Originally, vents were a sporting option, designed to make riding easier, so are traditional on hacking jackets, formal coats such as a morning coat, and, for practicality, overcoats. Today there are three styles of venting: the single-vented style (with one vent at the centre); the ventless style; and the double-vented style (one vent on each side). Vents are convenient, particularly when using a pocket or sitting down, to improve the hang of the jacket, so are now used on most jackets. Ventless jackets are associated with Italian tailoring, while the double-vented style is typically British. Dinner jackets traditionally have no vents.

== See also ==
- Blazer
- Sports jacket
- Tuxedo
- Smoking jacket
- Stroller (style)
- Pantsuit

== General and cited references ==
- Antongiavanni, Nicholas (2006). The Suit: A Machiavellian Approach to Men's Style. HarperCollins. ISBN 978-0-06-089186-2.
- Druesedow, Jean L.; Jno. J. Mitchell Co. (1990). Men's Fashion Illustrations from the Turn of the Century: by Jno. J. Mitchell Co. Courier Dover Publications. ISBN 978-0-486-26353-3.
- Flusser, Alan (1985). Clothes and the Man: The Principles of Fine Men's Dress. Villard. ISBN 0-394-54623-7.
- Flusser, Alan (2002). Dressing the Man: Mastering the Art of Permanent Fashion. HarperCollins. ISBN 0-06-019144-9.
