= Mess jacket =

Formal dress jacket of military origin

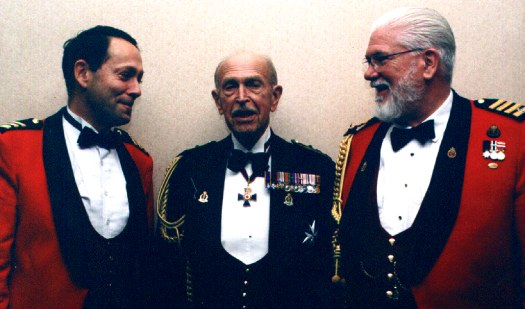
Canadian officers in mess jackets

The mess jacket is a type of formal jacket that ends at the waist. It features either a non-fastening double breast cut or a single-breasted version that fastens. The jackets have shawl or peak lapels. Used in military mess dress, during the 1930s it became a popular alternative to the white dinner jacket in hot and tropical weather for black tie occasions. It also was prominently used, in single-breasted form, as part of the uniform for underclassmen at Eton College, leading to the alternative name Eton jacket. Its origin was a spencer, a tail-less adaptation of the tailcoat worn by both men and women during the Regency period. The term mess is the area where military personnel dine and socialize, and thus "mess jacket" corresponds etymologically to "(military) dinner jacket".

== History ==
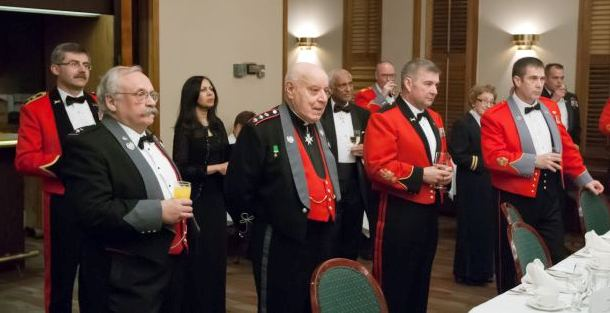
Two St John Ambulance of Canada officers in mess uniform (mess dress), black jacket with grey facings and cuffs, and red vest; with others in Canadian army mess uniforms.

The waist-length style of jacket first appeared in the 1790s when George Spencer, 2nd Earl Spencer removed the tails from his tailcoat. Spencer, it was thought, singed the tails of his tailcoat while standing beside a fire and then cut off the ends, unwittingly starting a new fashion. In the early 1800s, Eton College adopted it for first year students' uniforms; it was referred to as an Eton jacket. Civilians first adopted a white mess jacket in 1933 to wear in the tropical weather of Palm Beach, Florida, a popular tourist destination. It was adopted as part of mess dress, the military formal evening wear equivalent to civilian white tie and black tie.

The mess jacket soon fell out of fashion for two main reasons. One is that the jacket only worked well with an athletic and slim fit. The other reason is that the mess jacket had gone on to be worn by musicians, bellhops and waiters, leading the class conscious of the era to abandon the garment. It is still used in service industries. The jacket also continues to be used as part of military mess dress.
