= Pencil skirt =

Narrow, straight skirt

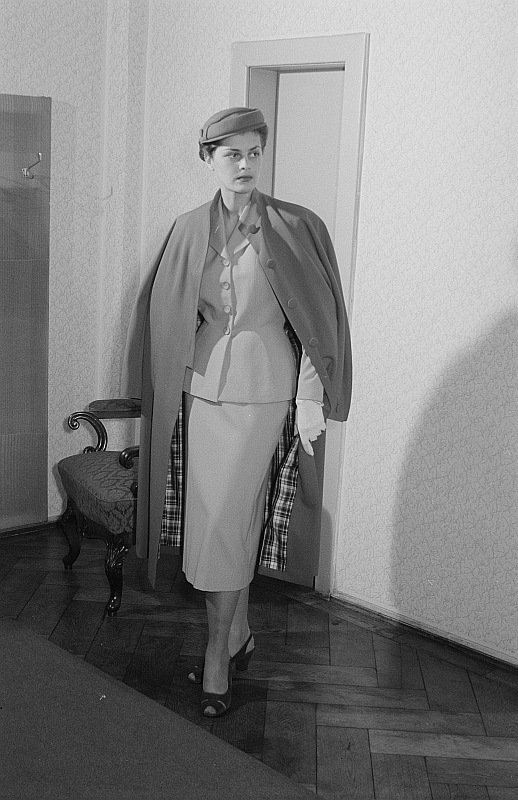
Suit with a pencil skirt, German, 1954

A pencil skirt is a slim-fitting skirt with a straight, narrow cut. Generally the hem falls to, or just below, the knee and is tailored for a close fit. It is named for its shape: long and slim like a pencil.

== Style ==
The pencil skirt may be worn either as a separate piece of clothing or as part of a suit. A pencil skirt usually has a vent at the back, or less commonly at the sides, since its slim, narrow shape can otherwise restrict the movement of the wearer. Sometimes a kick pleat, which exposes less skin, is used instead of a vent. Pencil skirts made from stretchy knitted fabrics do not normally need vents or pleats.

Typical shoes for wearing with a pencil skirt are pumps, or high heels, with sheer stockings or tights. Back-seamed hosiery recalls the classic pencil-skirt era of the 1950s. Pencil skirts can also be worn with flats for a more casual, youthful appearance that echoes the 1960s. Pencil skirts and loafers are classic preppy wear.

== History ==
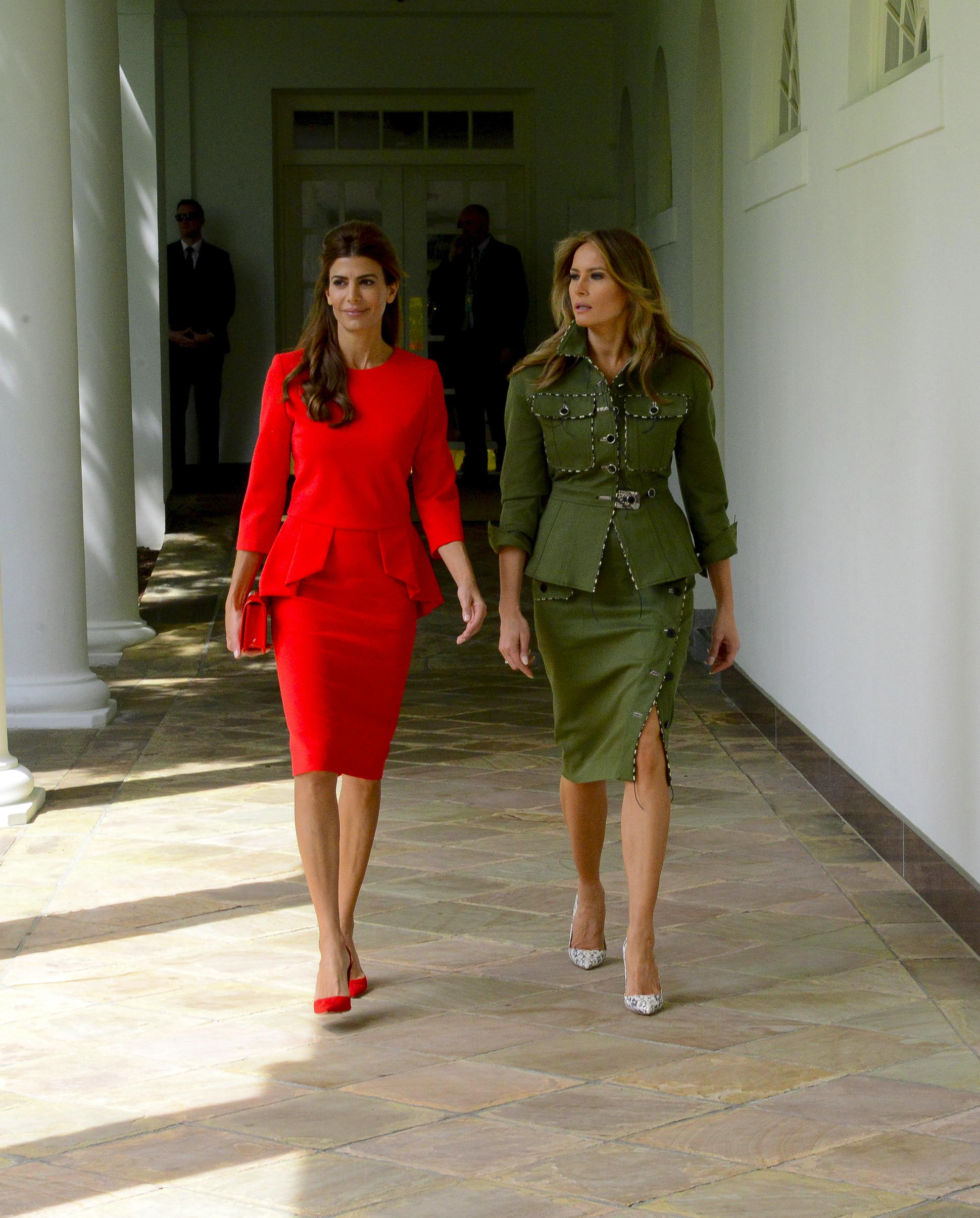
Juliana Awada and Melania Trump in pencil skirts, 2017

Narrow-fitting skirts have a long history in Western fashion. The predecessor to the pencil skirt is the hobble skirt, a pre–World War I fad inspired by the Ballets Russes. This full-length skirt with a narrow hem seriously impeded walking.

The French designer Christian Dior introduced the classic modern pencil skirt in his 1954 Autumn Winter collection.

Along with the miniskirt, the pencil skirt quickly became very popular, particularly for office wear. This success was due to women's desire for new fashions in the wake of Second World War and Cold War rationing, coupled with the austere economic climate, when fabrics were expensive.
