= Lapel =

Folded flap below a jacket or coat collar

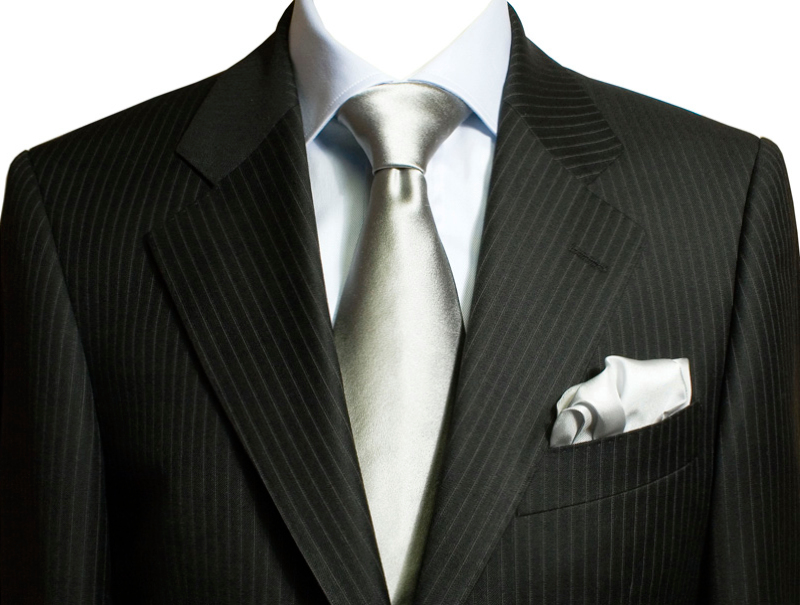
A pinstriped suit with a notched lapel

A lapel (/ləˈpɛl/ lə-PEL) is a folded flap of cloth on the front of a jacket or coat below the collar. It is most commonly found on formal clothing and suit jackets. Usually it is formed by folding over the front edge of the jacket or coat and sewing it to the collar, an extra piece of fabric around the back of the neck.

There are three basic forms of lapel: notched, peaked, and shawl. The notched lapel, the most common, is usually seen on business suits, and on more casual jackets like blazers and sport coats. The peaked lapel is more formal, and nearly always used on double-breasted jackets, but also frequently appears on single breasted ones. The shawl lapel is usually carried by tuxedos and mess jackets.

== Types ==
=== Notched ===
A notched lapel

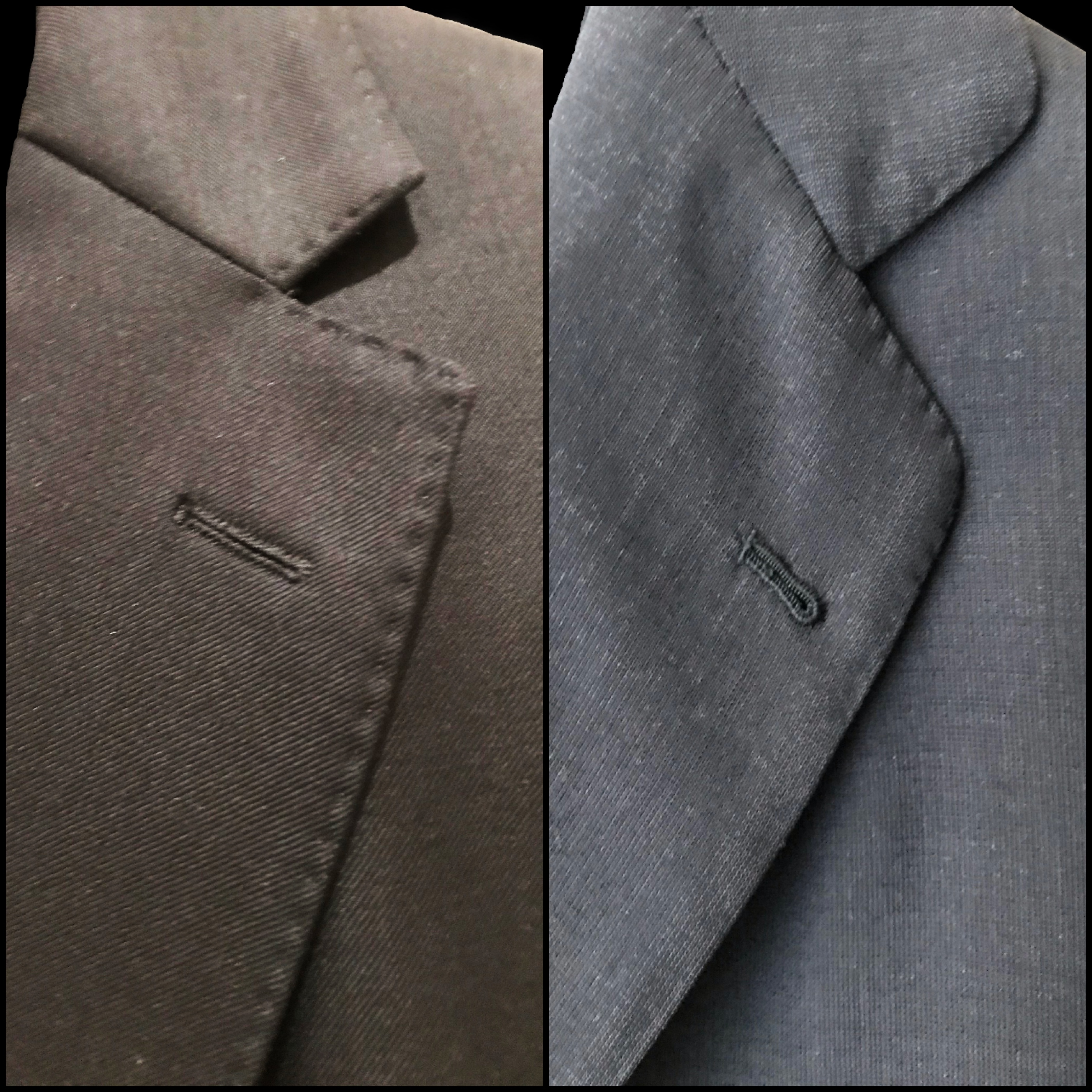
Comparison of two notched lapel cuts: English (left) and Spanish (right). The former is the most commonly seen notched lapel.

The notched lapel (American English), step lapel or step collar (British English) is sewn to the collar at an angle, creating a step effect. This is the standard on single-breasted suits, and is used on nearly all suit jackets, blazers, and sports jackets. The notched lapel double-breasted jacket is a rare setting. The size of the notch can vary, and a small notch is sometimes called fishmouth. This was the first type of lapel to appear and is the most common one.

=== Peaked ===
A peaked lapel

The peaked lapel (American English), peak lapel, or pointed lapel (British English), is the most formal, featuring on double-breasted jackets, all formal coats such as a tailcoat or morning coat, and also commonly with a tuxedo (both single and double breasted). In the late 1920s and 1930s, the single breasted peaked lapel jacket was considered a very stylish design. The feature was carried into day clothing by the increasing popularity of the peaked dinner jacket. The ability to cut peak lapels properly on a single-breasted suit is one of the most challenging tailoring tasks, even for very experienced tailors.

=== Shawl ===
A shawl lapel

The shawl lapel, shawl collar, or roll collar is a continuous curve. Originally seen on the Victorian smoking jacket, it is now most common on the dinner jacket or tuxedo. This similarly began as informal eveningwear, and was then made in both more and less formal versions, depending on the situation in which it was to be used. It is also commonly used on mess jackets. A Teba jacket sports a form of notch-less lapel that features an angular turn.

== Width ==
The width of the lapel is a widely varying aspect of suits, and has changed widely over the years. Some designers maintain however that most stylish lapel width does not change, and that the lapel "should extend to just a fraction less than the halfway mark between the collar and shoulder line".

== Fabric ==
The lapel on business and sports wear is typically made of the same fabric as the rest of the jacket. On more formal wear it may be made of a contrasting fabric, with satin a popular historic choice.

== Buttonhole ==
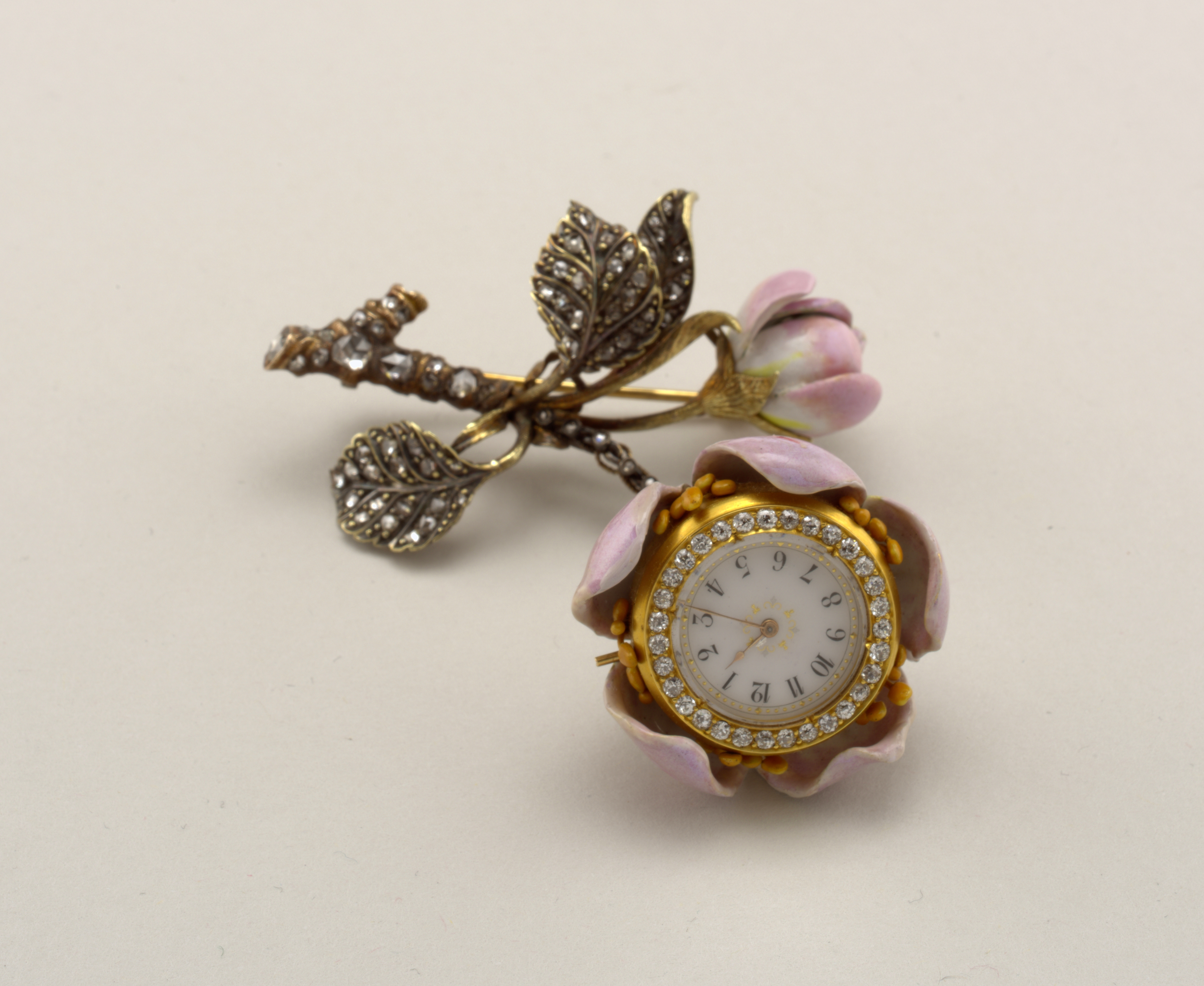
Lapel watch, USA, c. 1889, Cooper–Hewitt, Smithsonian Design Museum

On single-breasted jackets the left lapel typically carries a buttonhole for holding a boutonnière, a decorative flower. A loop is often fixed to the back of the lapel to hold the flower properly. For symmetry, double-breasted suits often have a buttonhole on each lapel. A lapel pin is also sometimes worn.

== Origin ==
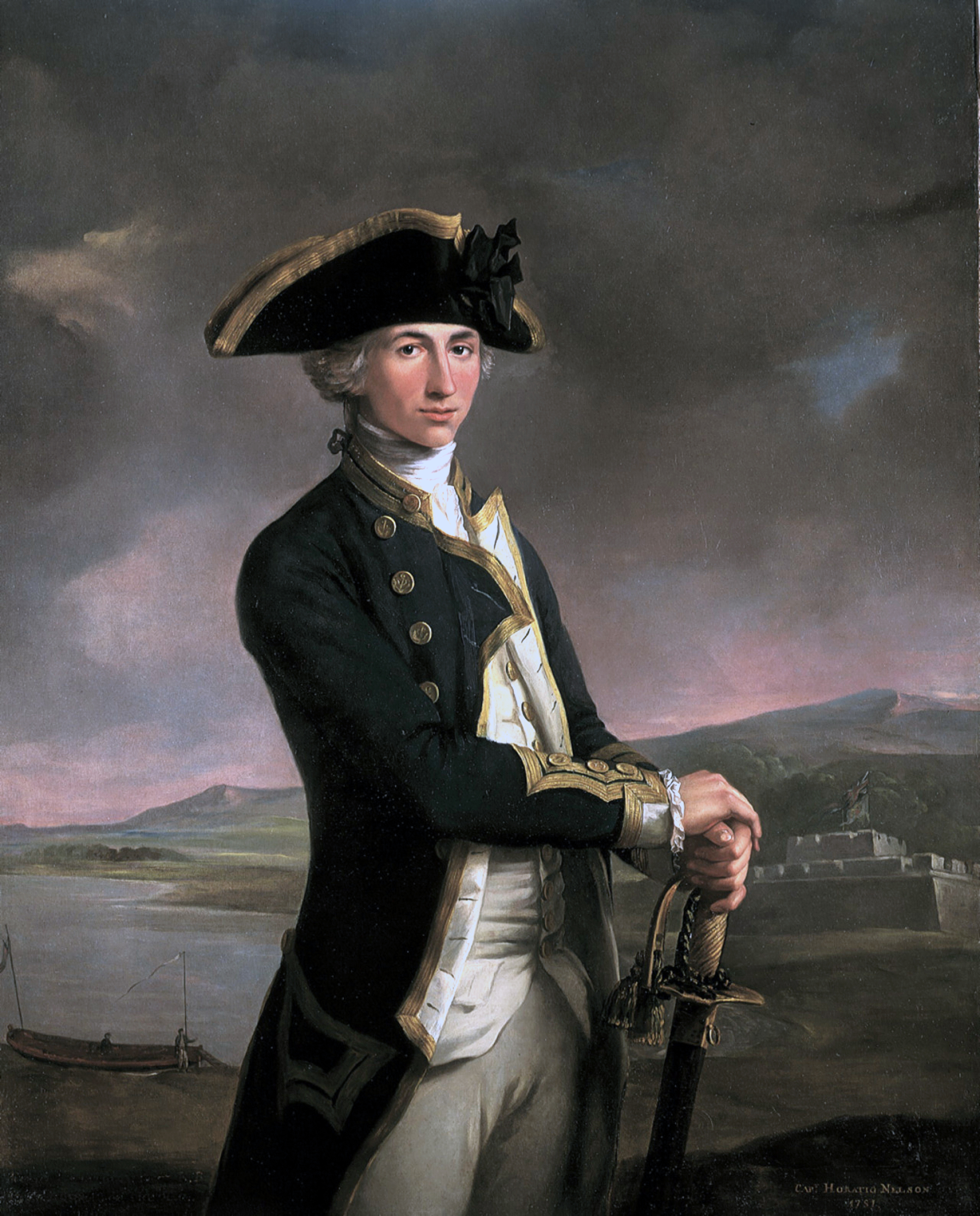
Lord Nelson in a Captain's tailcoat (1781), exhibiting a long, loosely-folded lapel with many buttons

The most common style of lapel, the notched lapel, originated in older types of jackets that buttoned to the neck, by unbuttoning and turning back the upper part of the closure at an angle indoors or in hot weather, and then removing the upper buttons. The upper points are derived from the end corners of the collar. This can be duplicated by similarly turning back the closure in a modern button-to-the-neck garment such as an overcoat or a boilersuit. Sometimes when caught outside in bad weather in a lapelled jacket and nothing over it, its wearer may unfold the lapels and hold them that way to temporarily reproduce the ancestral to-the-neck closure.

As tailcoats evolved rapidly among the wealthy during the Regency period, various styles of closure saw popularity, from fastenings at the top, the middle, or even hanging open. The turn-down collar popular on earlier garments like the frock was succeeded by long lapels folded down to below the waist (fashionably tightly nipped in). Invariably, there were long rows of buttons down the front, most of which did not fasten; in fact even into the late Victorian era, all frock coats had a long row of button holes on the lapel, long since obsolete. As buttoning styles changed, the loosely folded front of the coat correspondingly shifted shape, and the V then formed by the meeting of the fold and the collar continues now in the traditional shape of notched and peaked lapels, both of which originate from that period.

Once double breasted frock coats were established, lapels were sharply creased and their form was more static, varying only in details such as height, since they were buttoned nearly to the neck by the Edwardians, then lengthened to the classic three-button shape, the two-button jacket being a further American innovation. The other significant change over that period was the use of the revers in the construction of the lapel, as the Victorians used elaborate three-part patterns to cut a fold of cloth from the lining into the front of the lapel, a universal consideration of frock coats and dress coats of the period, but abandoned in favor of the current single-piece lapels at the same time as the switch to morning coats and lounge suits. Modern lapels are largely identical in form to their 1930s counterparts.

Some historians of dress such as Bernard Rudofsky have ridiculed the evolution of jacket lapels into "vastly unnecessary flaps" and "decorative rudiments", while others have celebrated the transformation of lapels into "fetishes" as part of fashion as expression.

== Lapelless jackets ==
Though less common among men's suits in the west, other jacket styles feature no lapels. Jackets with mandarin collars, also called stand collars, band collars, or choker collars, include Nehru jackets and various military dress uniforms, such as the British Army and US Marine Corps. Turndown collars, also called Prussian collars and ghillie collars, were once common on military uniforms and on the Mao suit.

== Bibliography ==
- Antongiavanni, Nicholas (2006). The Suit: A Machiavellian Approach to Men's Style. HarperCollins. ISBN 978-0-06-089186-2.
- Flusser, Alan (1985). Clothes and the Man: The Principles of Fine Men's Dress. Villard. ISBN 0-394-54623-7.
- Flusser, Alan (2002). Dressing the Man: Mastering the Art of Permanent Fashion. HarperCollins. ISBN 0-06-019144-9.
- Rudofsky, Bernard (1947). Are Clothes Modern?. Paul Theobald.
- Whife, A.A (ed): The Modern Tailor Outfitter and Clothier. The Caxton Publishing Company Ltd, London, 1951
- "Peak Lapel vs Notch Lapel". Shepherd & Woodward. 14 February 2025.
