= Vent (tailoring) =

Vertical slit from a jacket or coat

A vent is a vertical slit rising from the bottom hem of a jacket or a skirt, generally to allow for ease of movement.

In the case of jackets, vents were originally a sporting option, designed to make riding easier, so are traditional on hacking jackets, formal coats such as a morning coat, and, for reasons of pragmatism, overcoats. Today there are three styles of vent: the single-vented style (with one vent, either directly at the center or roughly 3 cm to the right); the ventless style; and the double-vented style (one vent on each side). Vents are convenient, particularly when using a pocket or sitting down, to improve the hang of the jacket, so are now used on most jackets. Ventless jackets are associated with Italian tailoring, while the double-vented style is typically British. (This is not the case with all types of jackets. For instance, dinner jackets traditionally take no vents.)

On skirts, vents are particularly associated with pencil skirts where they may be necessary for free movement, but they may also be added for reasons of style, as they have the effect of exposing more of the legs. The most common style is a single vent of a suitable length at the back of the skirt, but they may be located anywhere.
