= Double-breasted =

Style of jacket

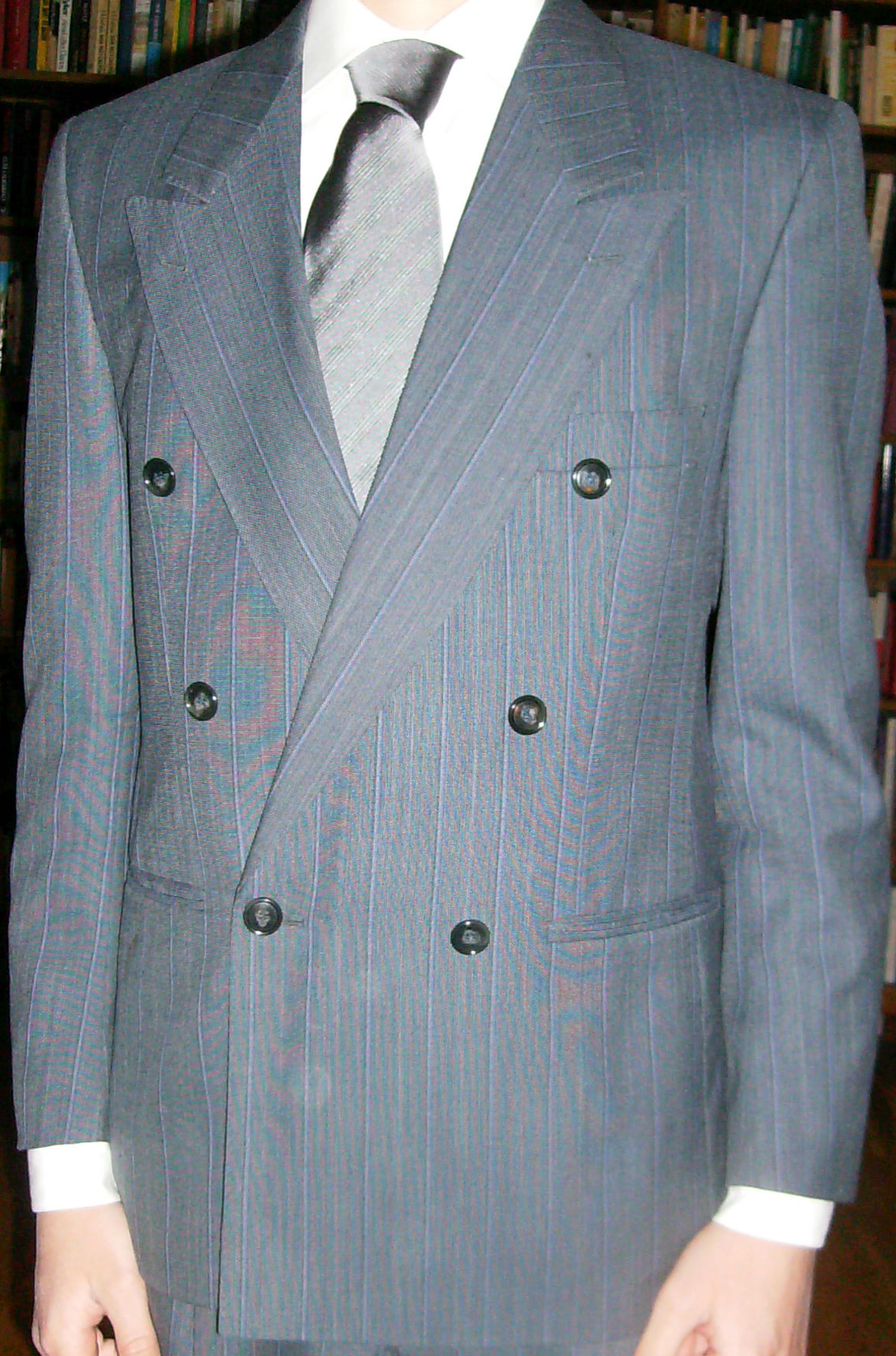
A grey striped six-on-one double-breasted suit with jetted pockets, a style popular in the 1980s

A double-breasted garment is a coat, jacket, waistcoat, or dress with wide, overlapping front flaps which has on its front two symmetrical columns of buttons; by contrast, a single-breasted item has a narrow overlap and only one column of buttons.

== Basic design and variations ==
Single- and double-breasted jackets

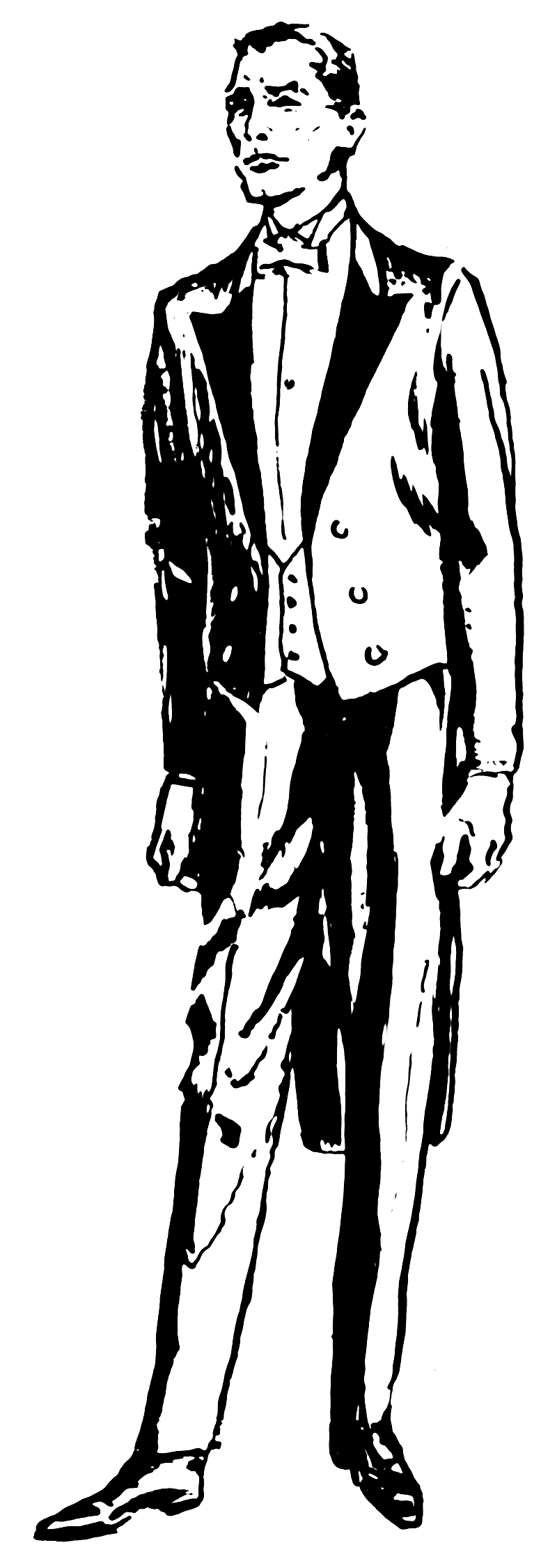
A double-breasted open-front tailcoat

On most modern double-breasted coats, one column of buttons is decorative, while the other is functional. The other buttons, placed on the outside edge of the coat breast, allow the overlap to fasten reversibly, left lapel over right lapel. To strengthen the fastening, a functional inner button, called the jigger (or anchor button), is usually added to parallel-fasten the overlapped layers together from the inside.

Double-breasted suit jackets, sports jackets and blazers typically have one to four rows of buttons (each row containing two buttons), one or two of the rows functional. Each fastening method is identified using "number-on-number" terminology; the first number is the total number of front buttons, the second is the number of fastening buttons below the lapels (i.e. the second number also is the number of corresponding buttonholes). Six-on-two and six-on-one (as shown in the picture on the right) are the common button stances, but others exist. Stylistically, double-breasted suit jackets usually have peaked lapels, and fasten left lapel over right lapel as usual for men's jackets. Some may find that six buttons overwhelms their shorter torso, a four- or six-button configuration in which only the bottom one fastens may be a better option. The four-button double-breasted jacket that buttons at the lower button is often called the "Kent", after the man who made it popular—Prince George, Duke of Kent.

== History ==
Double-breasted was the norm for frock coats during the 19th century. The early lounge suits that started to arrive around the turn of the 20th century tended to be single-breasted. Ever since, single-breasted has been the norm for suit jackets, but double-breasted suit jackets were popular from the mid-1930s until the late 1950s, and again from the mid-1980s to the early 2000s.

By the mid-2000s, men's double-breasted jackets were not as popular in the United States, and it was difficult to find them at many retail clothing stores. However, they continued to be popular in the United Kingdom, and in America were produced for and advocated by the high-end menswear lines of Joseph Abboud and Ralph Lauren.

The trench coat is also traditionally double-breasted, single-breasted versions being civilian interpretations of the original military-derived fashion. Other coat styles typically featuring a double-breasted construction are the Guards Coat and the greatcoat styles of overcoats. The Chesterfield coat may be found in either single or double-breasted.
