= Ottoman (textile) =

Woven or knitted widthways-ribbed textile

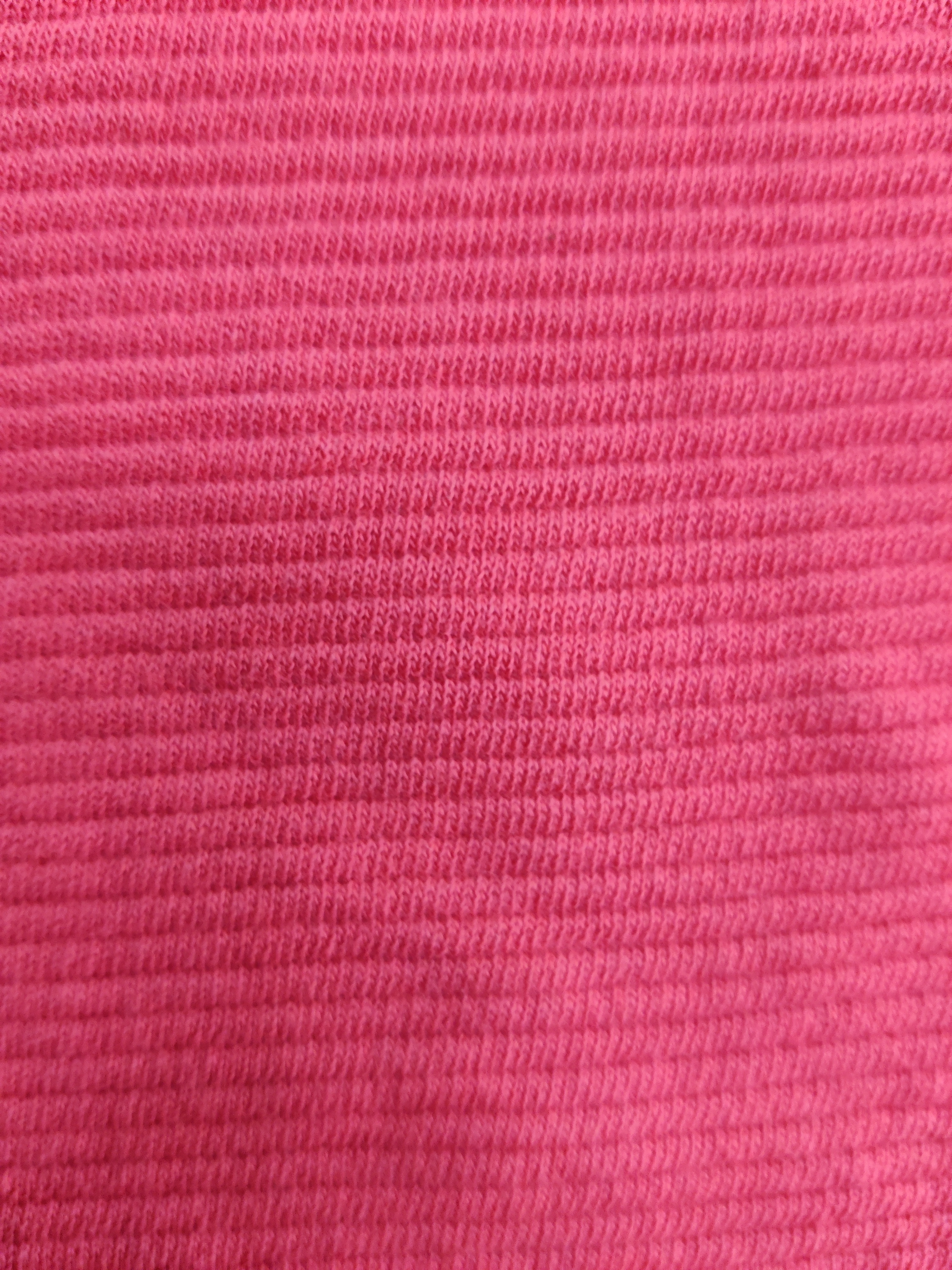
A knitted Ottoman rib fabric.

Ottoman is a widthways-ribbed textile with pronounced, raised 'ribs' along its wale and course. Similar to grosgrain, Ottoman is known as a corded fabric, using a thicker yarn in the course rather than the wale to create raised stripes running across the width of the fabric.

Ottoman may be knitted or woven, and produces a stiff, heavyweight fabric; knitted Ottoman features a likewise widthways rib structure. In knitting, the Ottoman rib pattern is knitted with double jersey machines. The rib lines in an Ottoman knit may vary in size from thin to coarse by adjusting yarn count and gauge.

== Derivation ==
The term Ottoman is derived from the French ottomane, the feminine of ottoman.

== Origin ==
Ottoman fabric originates from the Ottoman Empire in what is now modern-day Turkey, and is one of many Turkish artforms developed in the Ottoman period.

== Characteristics ==
Ottoman fabric, particularly woven Ottoman fabric, have a heavy ribbed structure and have an especially stiff drape. Like other woven corded fabrics - where the wale and course are unevenly matched in weight to create a ribbed effect - Ottoman has a tendency to 'slip' at seams, wherein the yarns of the weave pull apart but do not break.

== Composition ==
Ottoman was typically made of silk historically, though in the present day, is woven or knitted using cotton or synthetic fibre yarns, including artificial silk yarns such as rayon and polyester. These yarns may also be blended, with the exact fibre type blend depending on the end use of the fabric.

== Use ==
Ottoman is used for various purposes, from dressmaking to upholstery. It is usable for evening wear, formal coats and dress, and in particular, legal dress (such as KC gowns), as well as academic dress (mostly for hoods).
