= Guards Coat =

Men's overcoat

A Guards Coat or Guard's Coat (sometimes Guardsman's coat) is a men's overcoat which has a half-belt in the back, and is based on the coat that used to be worn by English officers of the guard. It is a double-breasted garment in either a 6x3 (more traditional) or 6x2 (more formal) configuration; in a 6x3 configuration, all three working buttons can be fastened, or just the bottom two. The half-belt can be adjusted with buttons (more traditional) or sewn in place (more formal). The Guards Coat has either an Ulster collar (more traditional) or peaked lapels (more formal), turn-back cuffs (traditional) or button cuffs (formal), and welt or flap pockets. It comes mostly in formal colours such as a deep navy or midnight blue, and is more formal than the more countrified Ulster coat. These features mean that in its most formal configuration, it is largely similar to a Paletot or double-breasted Chesterfield coat, being distinguished primarily by its color and the presence of the half-belt in back; in its most traditional configuration, it is similar to a military greatcoat but without epaulets, or to a capeless Ulster coat but with a half-belt, different pockets and more formal fabric.
