= Single-breasted =

Style of jacket

Single- and double-breasted jackets

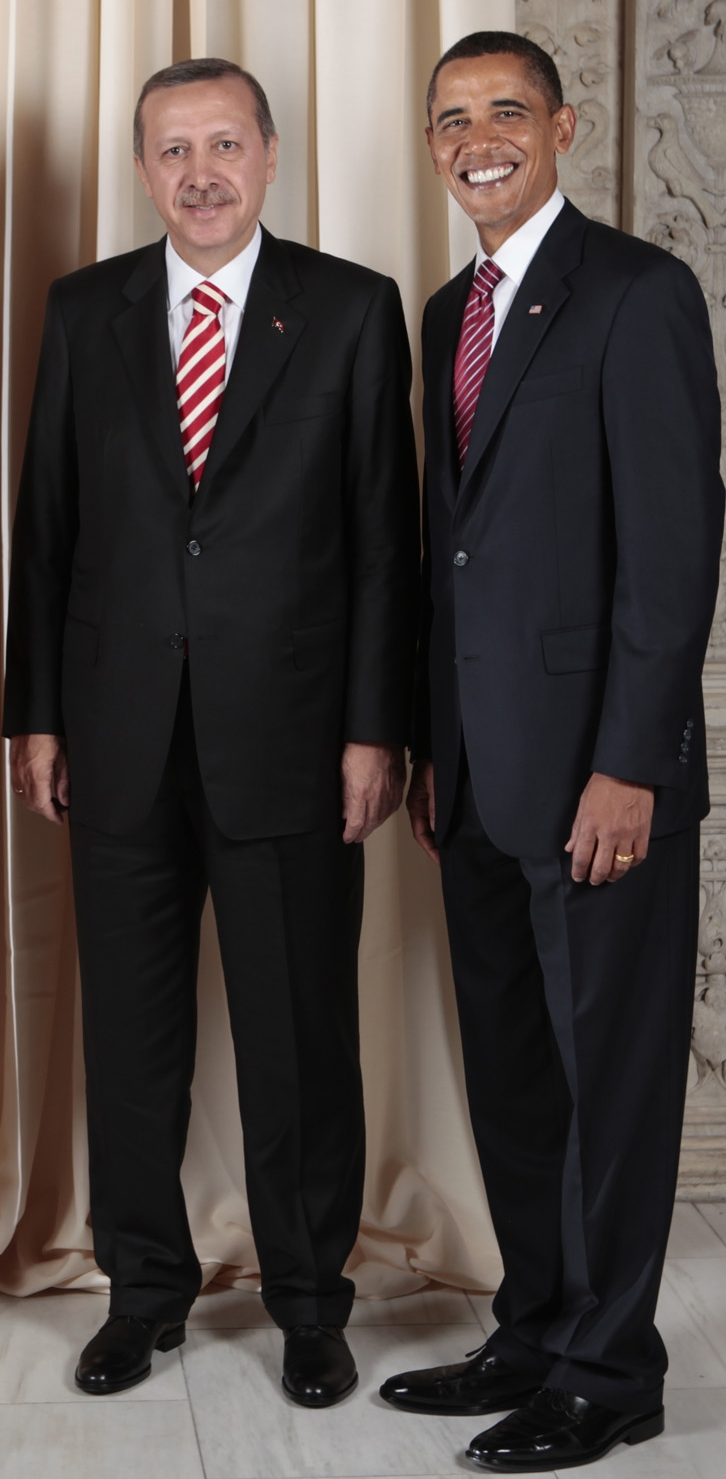
Recep Erdoğan and Barack Obama wearing single-breasted suits.

A single-breasted garment is a coat, jacket, vest, or similar item having one column of buttons and a narrow overlap of fabric. In contrast, a double-breasted coat has a wider overlap and two parallel rows of buttons. Single-breasted suit jackets and blazers typically have two or three buttons (jackets with one or four buttons are less common), and a notch lapel. However, from the 1930s onwards, peaked lapels on a single button jacket have been variably in fashion. The width of the lapels is one of the most changeable aspects of the jacket, and narrow peak lapels on single-breasted jackets became popular during the 2000s.

Historically, the single-breasted jacket was worn by the ground troops: it was easier to mount a horse with the fronts spreading out to the sides. The back of the jacket also had one slit for ease of dressage. Those who were especially enterprising even cut the floors in the front, and so appeared a modern tailcoat. Buttons on a single-breasted jacket could be from one to four, and one of them should always be buttoned. The lowest one, on the contrary, is not in the buttonhole.

In general, a single-breasted jacket is a more versatile and practical option. Due to several layers of fabric in the belly area, models with two rows of buttons can be very plump. Also, if the wearer slouches, such a jacket will gather in unsightly folds. A single-breasted set could better conceal these shortcomings.

== In women's clothing ==
Although this term largely describes men's suits, this style also applies to women's garments.
