= Demitoilet =

Style of dresses

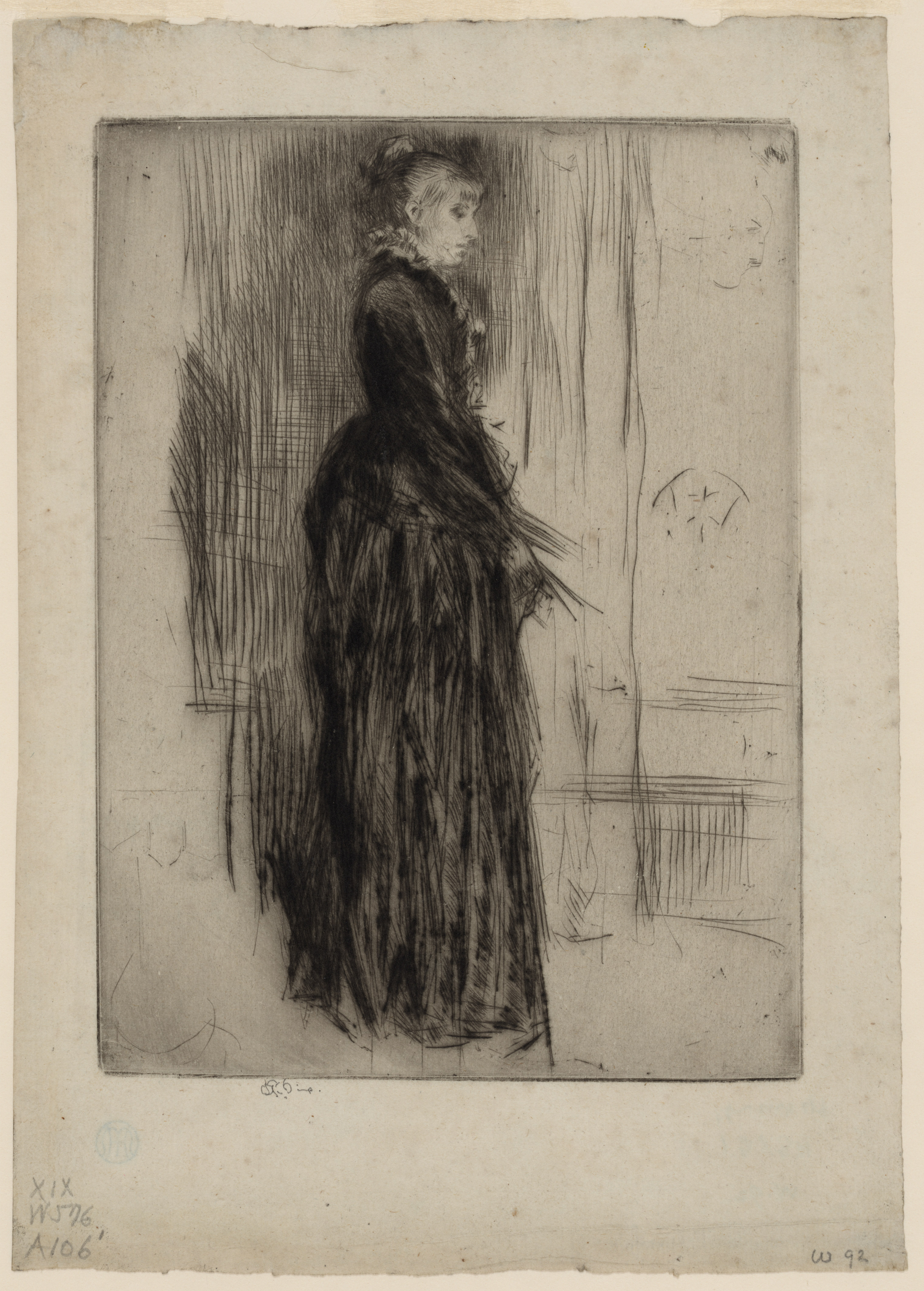
- An early example of the demi-toilet dress from 1800

Demi-toilet (or demi-toilette) refers to a style of dress that is somewhat elaborate but less formal than the full dress style expected at evening parties. It is a historical style of semi-formal wear or morning dress popular in the 19th century.

The etiquette was for women to wear the demi-toilet style, with or without bonnets, at an afternoon party, such as five o'clock tea or coffee; morning receptions, which were parties held from four to seven o'clock in the afternoon; kettle drums, which were parties where the guests were only expected to stay for around half an hour. Women were advised not to wear low-necked dresses or short sleeves, and to reserve their most elegant jewelry and laces for the evening.

The name comes from the 18th- and 19th-century toilette, where a wealthy woman would entertain guests in her dressing room or boudoir to help her get ready and allow her to demonstrate her taste and finery.

== Quotes about demi-toilet fashion ==
Flowers are now but little worn in the corsage in demi-toilet, being replaced by knots of ribbon in hues contrasting with that of the dress.

— The Southern World, December 15, 1882, Fashion Notes

...about half-past 5 all are ready in European toilet for an evening stroll or drive, previous to dinner at 7.30. It seems that the fashion so long prevalent of ladies going out at this hour in demi-toilet is passing away, bonnets and close dresses being now in vogue; but many still hold to the old fashion, and the effect is rather pretty as they promenade under the great avenues or flash past in carriages in the gathering dusk. Gentlemen, however, still go with uncovered heads.

— ANNA FORBES, INSULINDE: EXPERIENCES OF A NATURALIST'S WIFE IN THE EASTERN ARCHIPELAGO (1886), CHAPTER I

== Examples of demi-toilet dress ==
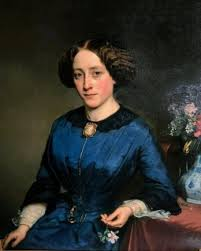
A blue demi-toilet dress

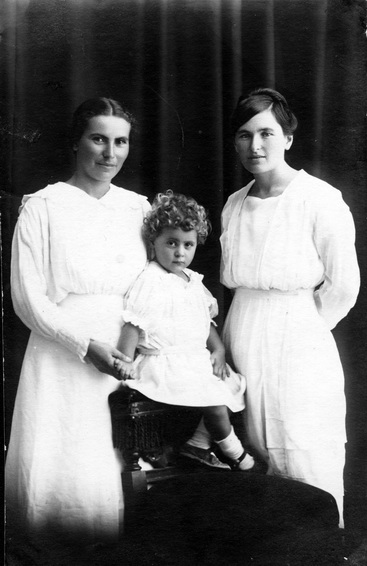
A white demi-toilet dress
