= Jennifer Rachel Bibbings =

British lawyer

- Born: 1963; UK
- Occupation(s): Lawyer, businessperson
- Awards: Order of the British Empire

Jennifer Rachel Bibbings is a British lawyer, residing in the United Arab Emirates, working as a lawyer and honorary legal advisor to the British Consulate in Dubai and the Northern Emirates. She was awarded the Officer of the Most Excellent Order of the British Empire in 2014 for her contributions to the community and for strengthening relations between the UK and the UAE.

== Biography ==
Jennifer Rachel Bibbings was born in 1963 in the UK. She is married, has a son and a daughter and resides in Dubai.

== Career ==
Bibbings first came to Dubai in 1993 and a year later, started working pro bono as a legal advisor to the British Consulate in Dubai and the Northern Emirates. She is the partner of the legal firm, Trowers and Hamlins LLP in Dubai.

== Positions held ==
Jennifer Bibbings was the female committee member of the British Business Group of Dubai and the Northern Emirates and later became its first female chair during 2003 to 2006. She also helped to set up the British University in Dubai in 2004. She serves as governor of Jebel Ali Primary School, one of Dubai's oldest schools.

== Awards and recognitions ==
Bibbings was awarded the Order of the British Empire in 2014. She is also listed in the Chambers and Partners’ Global Guide and The Legal 500 Guide for the corporate and commercial fields.
