= Red Sea rig =

Dress code for semi-formal events

Red Sea rig, sometimes known as gulf rig or schooner rig, is a dress code for semi-formal evening events, which in general consists of black tie attire with the jacket removed, a red bow tie and red cummerbund, although there are local variations.

== History ==
Red Sea rig was originally a Royal Navy concept appearing during the nineteenth century. Historically, it was felt that Royal Navy officers, like their British Army counterparts, should wear the full appropriate uniform for all formal events, whatever the temperature. The sole exception was in the Red Sea, where the heat and humidity often made this physically impossible. Here, officers were permitted to remove their jackets in the wardroom, provided they added a cummerbund to temper the somewhat informal look. Royal Air Force officers serving on Navy ships follow the naval tradition wearing a Red Sea rig version of their own mess dress.

In his reminiscences For King and Country, Nelson Albert Tomalin describes a rather home-made version of Red Sea rig worn on board the whaler Southern Sea in 1943 as "...white shirt with epaulettes and long blue trousers with a black scarf as a cummerbund...".

Because of its obvious practicality, Red Sea rig was adopted into civilian life, first by British diplomats in the Red Sea town of Jeddah, and later by the local British Business Group. It is now widely worn by many military and civilian organisations and is often the dress code of choice for dinner parties in British expatriate communities in the Middle East and Far East.

Red Sea rig originated prior to air conditioning as a purely practical measure, but has now become a dress-style in its own right, even if the party or function is held in an air conditioned venue.

Decorations, even in miniature, are not normally worn with Red Sea rig, although medal miniature ribbons are.

== Variants ==
There are many military and civilian variations of the Red Sea rig:

- Original Navy: Short-sleeved white shirt (open neck), formal dress trousers and black cummerbund
- BBG / British Diplomatic: Long-sleeved white dress shirt, red bow tie, formal dress trousers and red cummerbund.
- American diplomatic (also known as Gulf Rig): Simply black-tie attire, minus the jacket, although cummerbunds are often worn.
- Royal Marines band: White long-sleeved dress shirt, black bowtie, normal uniform trousers with red side stripes, red cummerbund.
- Scottish Highland: The military version consists of a long sleeved white dress shirt, black bow tie, tartan trews and a silk cummerbund in the regimental tartan (unless this is the very dark Campbell tartan, in which case a red, green or blue cummerbund may be substituted). The civilian version is usually a long sleeved white dress shirt, black or red bow tie and kilt.

== See also ==
- Formal wear
  - White tie
- Semi-formal wear
  - Black tie
- Mess dress
- Territory rig
