= Mess dress uniform =

Formal evening dress worn by military personnel

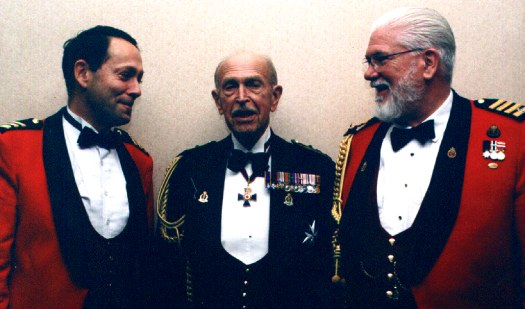
Three Canadian officers in shawl or rolled collar jacket and waistcoat style mess dress or mess kit. Miniature medals and other accoutrements are also worn.

Mess dress uniform is the most formal (or semi-formal, depending on the country) type of evening-wear uniform used by military personnel, police personnel, and other uniformed services members.

== Background ==
First originating in the British Army in the 1840s (see below), this order of evening dress frequently consists of a mess jacket, trousers, a white dress shirt, and a black bow tie, along with orders, medals, and insignia. Design may depend on regiment or service branch, e.g., army, navy, air force, marines, etc. In modern Western dress codes, mess dress uniform is the supplementary alternative equivalent to the civilian black tie for evening wear. Mess dress uniforms can be less or more formal than full dress uniform, depending on country, but nevertheless universally more formal than service dress uniform. The term mess is the area where military personnel dine and socialize, and thus "mess dress uniform" corresponds etymologically to "(military) dinner dress", as in the civilian dinner jacket.

Prior to World War II, in Europe, this style of military uniform was largely restricted to the British, although the French, German, Swedish, and other navies had adopted their own versions of mess dress during the late 19th century, influenced by the Royal Navy.

The mess dress uniform is predominantly worn at occasions by commissioned officers and senior non-commissioned officers. It is very rarely - but not incorrectly - worn as an optional uniform by junior ranks. It is also sometimes worn by members of royal courts or certain civilian uniformed services.

== Australia ==
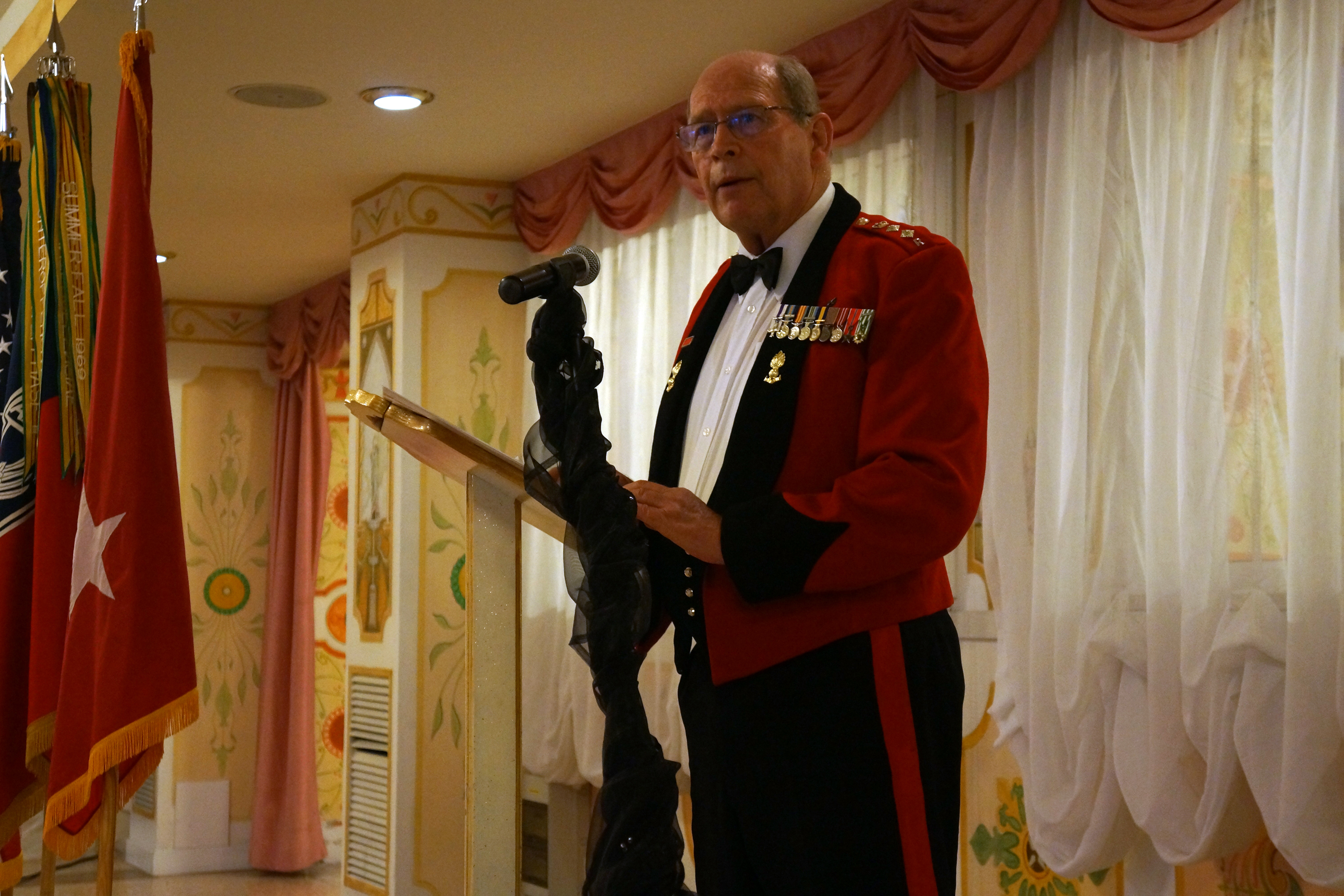
A retired colonel of the Australian Army in Mess Dress Senior Officer, 2013.

The Australian Army has separate mess kits to be worn as the occasion requires. 'Mess Dress': this order of dress includes a jacket and waistcoat in Corps colours, worn by officers with blue trousers for males, and blue slacks or blue skirt for females. 'Mess Dress Senior Officer' is similar; however, worn by Officers of the rank Colonel and higher. 'Mess Dress White Jacket': is a separate order of dress including a white mess jacket, worn with blue trousers for males, and blue slacks or blue skirt for females, and cummerbund by officers, WOs and SNCOs.

Both orders of dress are worn with a bow tie and white shirt. Mess Dress is sometimes referred to as ‘Mess Dress Winter’ and Mess Dress White Jacket as ‘Mess Dress Summer’ but this terminology is incorrect. Mess Dress may be worn throughout the year according to the occasion and climatic conditions. WOs and SNCOs have no alternative to Mess Dress White Jacket.The Royal Australian Air Force has different mess uniforms for summer and winter. The summer mess kit is marked out by a white jacket while the winter jacket is dark blue.

== Belgium ==
The official name of the Belgian Armed Forces mess dress is "Tenue 1C" or "Spencer". It is worn only after 18:00 hours, at ceremonies in the presence of the King, a member of the royal family or a foreign head of state. It can also be worn when civilians are in white or black tie.

It consists of a dark-blue jacket with two golden buttons linked by a chain closure, dark-blue trousers and a low-cut marcella waistcoat. The waistcoat is of the regimental or corps colour. Regimental colours also figure on the edge of the shoulder straps. This is matched by a white dress shirt and a black bow tie. The ranks are embroidered onto the shoulder straps of the jacket, except for the Navy, where the rank curls are placed at the bottom of the sleeves.

The spencer dress is allowed for all ranks. Generals and cavalry, horse artillery or logistical officers may wear spurs. Women wear similar dress, with a long dark blue skirt, and black lace instead of the bow tie.

It is distinct from 1A Dress (Groot Galatenue/Grande Tenue de Gala) or 1B Dress (Galatenue/Tenue de Gala), which resembles the British Army N°1 Blue Dress. These orders are worn for weddings, military ceremonies and repas de corps.

An oversea version with a white jacket is available to Navy personnel (Tenue 5H1).

== Canada ==
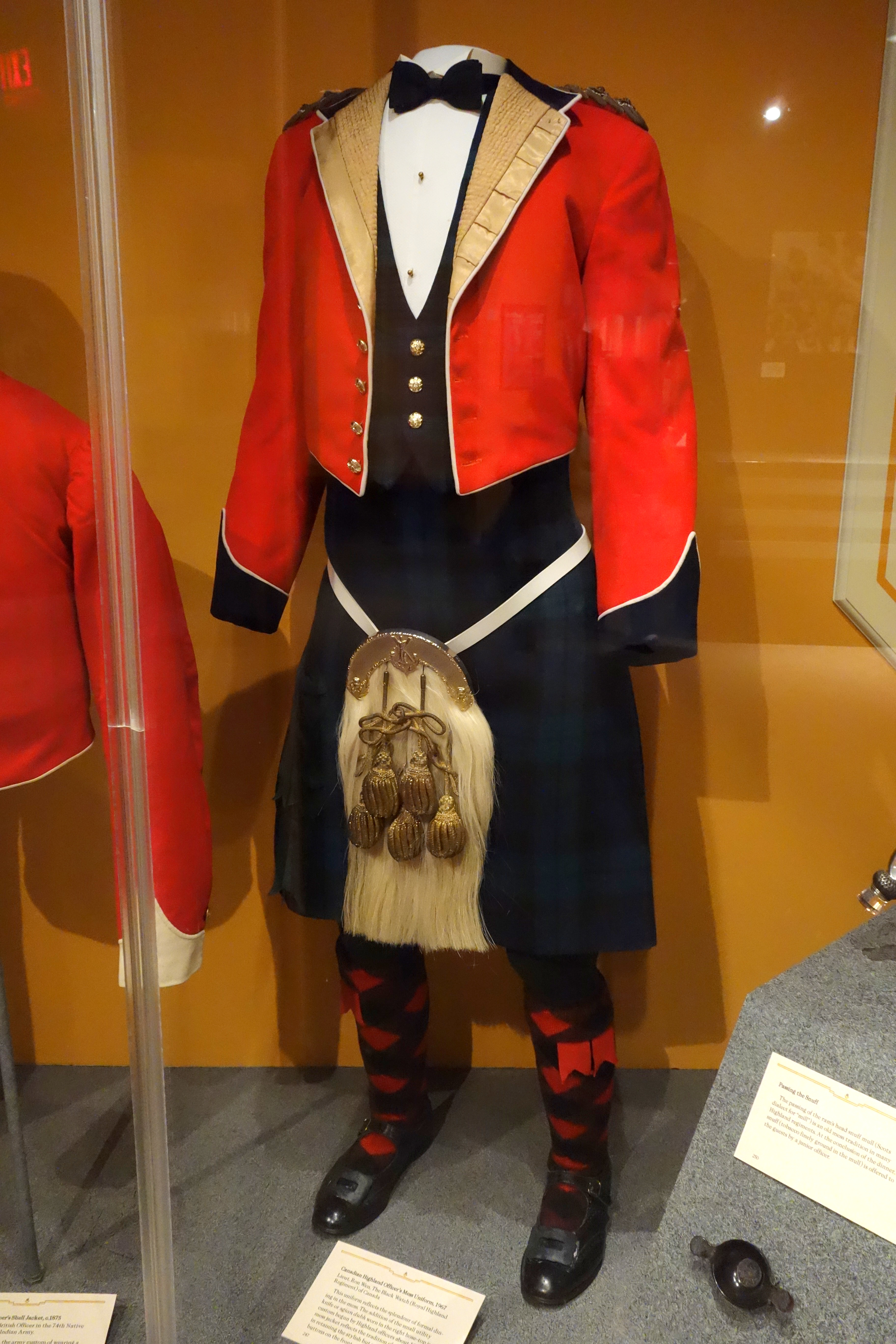
Mess dress uniform for The Black Watch (Royal Highland Regiment) of Canada on display

Mess dress is worn as formal evening attire for mess dinners. Uniforms range from full mess dress (with dinner jackets, cummerbunds or waistcoats) to service dress worn with a bow tie for individuals not required to own mess dress (non-commissioned members and members of the Reserve Force). Mess dress is not provided at public expense. All commissioned officers of the Regular Force are required to own mess dress within six months of being commissioned. The winter mess dress (No. 2) for the Royal Canadian Navy consists of a navy blue jacket with gold laced rank insignia worn on the sleeve, gold-laced navy blue trousers worn by all commissioned officers (unlike in the Royal Navy they are not restricted to captains and flag officers), white shirt with soft or wing collar, and a white waistcoat. Officers of the rank of Captain(N) and above wear a tailcoat instead of the standard jacket. NCMs trousers are the same pattern, but without gold lace down the seam. Miniatures of medals earned are worn on the left lapel; regular size qualification badges earned are worn on the left sleeve, above the rank insignia (as they are worn in the Royal Navy for naval aviators). Summer mess dress (No. 2A) is similar except that a white jacket with rank insignia on navy blue shoulder boards (gold covered for flag officers) is worn, with either a waistcoat or cummerbund.

The winter standard pattern mess dress (No. 2) for the Canadian Army consists of a scarlet jacket with rank insignia worn on soft shoulder loops, scarlet-laced dark blue (almost black) trousers, white shirt with soft or wing collar and dark blue waistcoat. The details of regimental distinctions vary by regiments and are defined in detail in the Canadian Forces Dress Instructions. Miniature medals are worn on the left breast below miniatures of qualification badges earned. The summer standard pattern mess dress is similar except that a white jacket with rank insignia worn on black shoulder boards, and cummerbund, is worn. Army reserve regiments are authorized to wear mess dress that is distinctive to the regiment and which can consist of jackets of different cuts (for example high collar) and colours, rather than the standard pattern mess dress. Authorized summer dress (No. 2A), consisting of the white jacket in lieu of scarlet, varies from regiment to regiment, but typically is not authorized for NCMs below the rank of Warrant Officer.

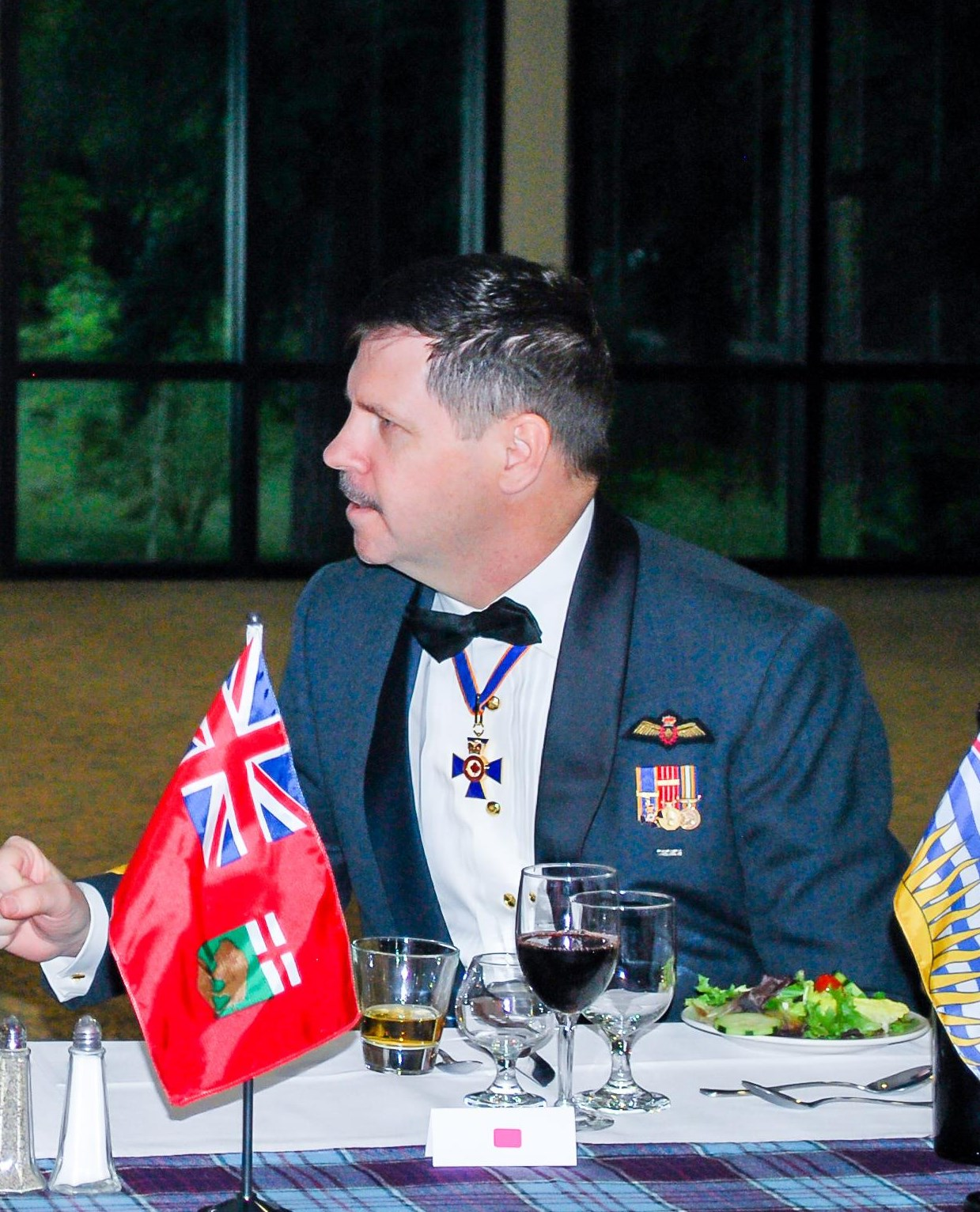
Lieutenant General Pierre St-Amand of the Royal Canadian Air Force in winter mess dress, 2016.

The winter mess dress of the Royal Canadian Air Force consists of a midnight blue jacket with gold rank insignia worn on the sleeve, black-laced midnight blue trousers, white shirt with soft collar, and a cummerbund in the colours of the Royal Canadian Air Force tartan. Miniature medals are worn on the left breast above miniatures of qualification badges earned. The summer mess dress (No. 2A) is similar except that a white jacket with rank insignia worn on midnight blue shoulder boards is worn, and is authorized as an optional order for RCAF officers only.

No. 2B is authorized as an alternative for Regular Force officers who have not yet purchased mess uniform, and for Reserve Force officers and all NCMs as they are not required to purchase mess uniform. It applies to all three elements and consists of the standard service dress uniform appropriate to the element (rifle green for the Army, navy blue for the RCN and light blue for the RCAF), a white long-sleeved shirt (as issued to navy personnel) and a black bow tie. Undress ribbons and nametag are worn.

No. 2C is a relaxed, ship-board only order of mess uniform, worn by members of all elements when dining formally onboard HMC Ships at sea. It consists of the service short sleeve shirt and service dress trousers appropriate to the element, and a cummerbund in black or authorized regimental colours. Name tag, medals/ribbons are not worn.

No. 2D is the CF standard pattern mess dress, now superseded, which was authorized for wear prior to the reversion to separate environmental uniforms for Army, Navy and Air Force. It is identical to Air Force No. 2 dress, except that buttons and other accoutrements reflect the unified CF uniform prevalent from 1968 to circa 1987. It is authorized for wear by personnel who had joined "and acquired their mess uniform" before the re-establishment of distinctive environmental uniforms.

== France ==
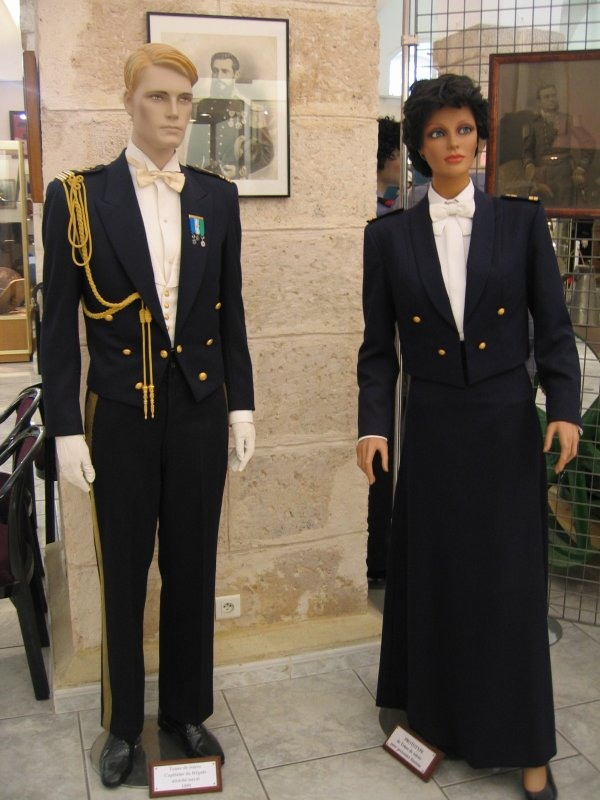
Male and female officer mess dress of the French Army.

Until World War II officers of the French Army wore their full dress (grande tenue) uniforms for evening as well as daytime formal and ceremonial occasions. Naval officers however had a special mess uniform similar in style to that of the Royal Navy.

Since the 1950s, officers of all service branches of the French Armed Forces, including joint services such as the Health Service, have a mess dress known as Tenue 1A.

It consists of a night blue jacket with ornamented shoulder straps with rank insignia, night blue trousers, a white shirt, a black bow tie, a night blue cummerbund, black polished shoes and black socks.

Women wear a similar uniform, with a night blue long skirt, a white satiny shirt and a white satiny bow tie.
Headdress, a night blue cloak and white gloves may be worn outside only.

Fourragères and aiguillettes are not worn, with the exception of the aiguillette obtained for individual merits.
Miniature medals are worn for most decorations, only the recipients of national orders above the rank of Commandeur may wear the collar and sash.

An overseas version with a white jacket is available.

== Germany ==
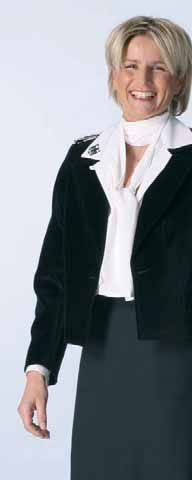
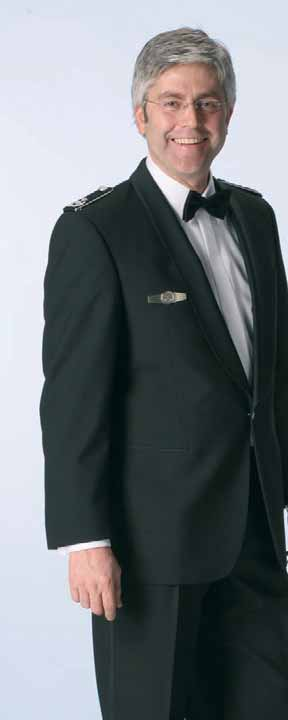
German Army formal dress

Mess uniforms were worn by officers of the Imperial German Navy, though not by army officers. During the 1930s in Nazi Germany, officers of the Schutzstaffel (SS) had the option of purchasing mess dress uniforms. SS mess dress resembled a double-breasted dinner jacket, with collar tabs and white piping.

In modern Germany, mess dress is a permitted uniform for officers and non-commissioned officers (NCOs) of the Bundeswehr attending white or black tie festive social occasions. Female soldiers wear a long dark-blue skirt and a white blouse with the Bundesadler ("Federal Eagle" coat of arms) on the right collar. This is combined with a long scarf across the chest and a dark blue short velvet jacket. A variant with a short white silk jacket combined with a blue blouse is also permitted. Purses and other accessories may be carried.

The basic mess dress (Grundform) for men consists of a jacket with a chain closure, trousers with black silk trim strips, and either a cummerbund (army, air force, navy) or a Torerobund (a torero-style waist sash, for the army and air force). These sashes or cummerbunds are of black fabric for the army and dark blue for the air force and navy. The chain is gold for the navy and for army and air force generals; others wear a silver chain. This is matched by a white dress shirt (with a concealed placket; no stand-up collars, ruffles, or embroidery) and a black bow tie and black or black patent leather shoes.

As a variation, a black smoking jacket with black silk collar and black silk-covered passant (Army, Air Force) may be worn instead. The ranks are embroidered onto the epaulettes. The jacket is worn without cuff titles, collar patches, or any other coloured insignia. In the navy, rank insignia is placed on the sleeves. Activity, proficiency, or specialist badges are often included in the embroidered portion. Miniature versions of any orders and decorations are worn from ribbons.

== Greece ==
The mess dress of the Hellenic Armed Forces, adopted in 1953, resembles the "rolled collar" jacket, waistcoat and trousers pattern of the British Army as described in this article. It is classed as no. 4 dress. Colours are those of the historic full dress uniform of the particular branch or service (e.g. medium green with crimson facings for armored cavalry officers, dark blue with red facings for infantry officers). A white version is authorized for summer wear.

== Indonesia ==
The Indonesian National Armed Forces (TNI) version of the mess dress uniform is categorized in the "PDU" (Pakaian Dinas Upacara) or "full dress uniform" type "II" / PDU No. 2. It is only worn by officers, and is worn when attending state-level banquets and official receptions in or outside the country.

== Israel ==
In keeping with the Israel Defense Forces' doctrine of a People's Army, mess uniform is not worn inside Israel. It takes the form of a khaki service uniform rather than the special evening dress as worn by many other nations. It is only worn abroad, either by military attachés or by senior officers on official state visits. These rules also apply to the IDF dress uniform. Because of the small number of uniforms required they are bespoke tailored for the specific officer. The mess uniforms are the only Israeli army order of dress to include a tie, and have a summer version and a winter version.

== Jamaica ==
Both senior non-commissioned officers and commissioned officers of the Jamaica Defence Force may wear (No. 5 Dress) mess kit.

== New Zealand ==
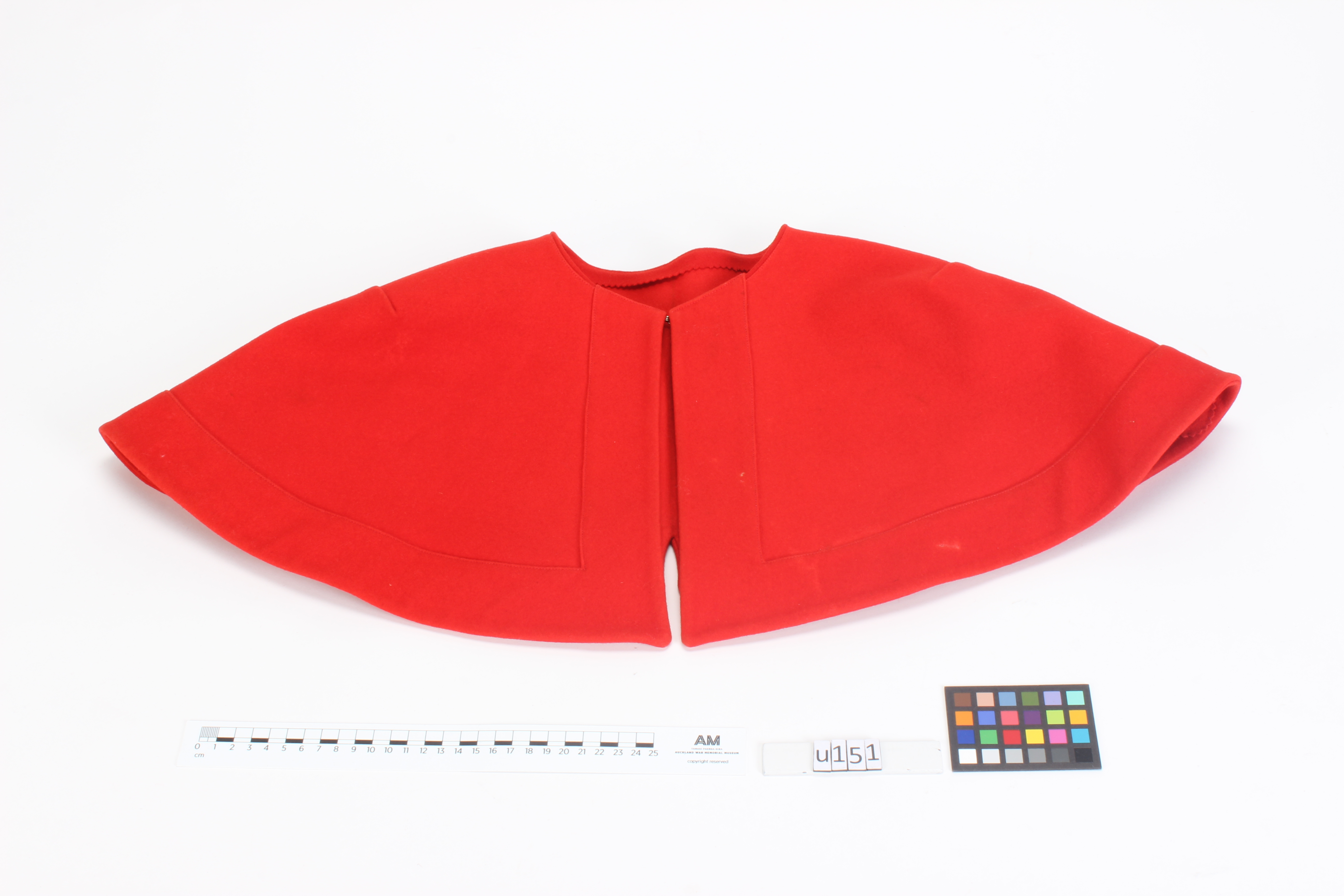
Cape worn with the mess uniform for the New Zealand Army Nursing Service, during the First World War.

The Royal New Zealand Navy, New Zealand Army, and Royal New Zealand Air Force have mess uniforms of similar style to those worn by the equivalent British and Australian services.

New Zealand Army mess uniforms authorised for officers were simplified about 2000 in that the distinctive corps and regimental colours previously worn were replaced by a universal scarlet and blue pattern with only insignia and cummerbund colours distinguishing one branch or unit from another.

Royal New Zealand Air Force mess dress consists of grey/blue jackets, trousers and waistcoats with white shirts and black bow ties. Any medals are displayed above the left breast pocket. Individual flying squadron colours appear on mess dress belts worn by officers. Senior NCOs (sergeants, flight sergeants, and warrant officers) also wear mess dress for various special functions.

== Norway ==
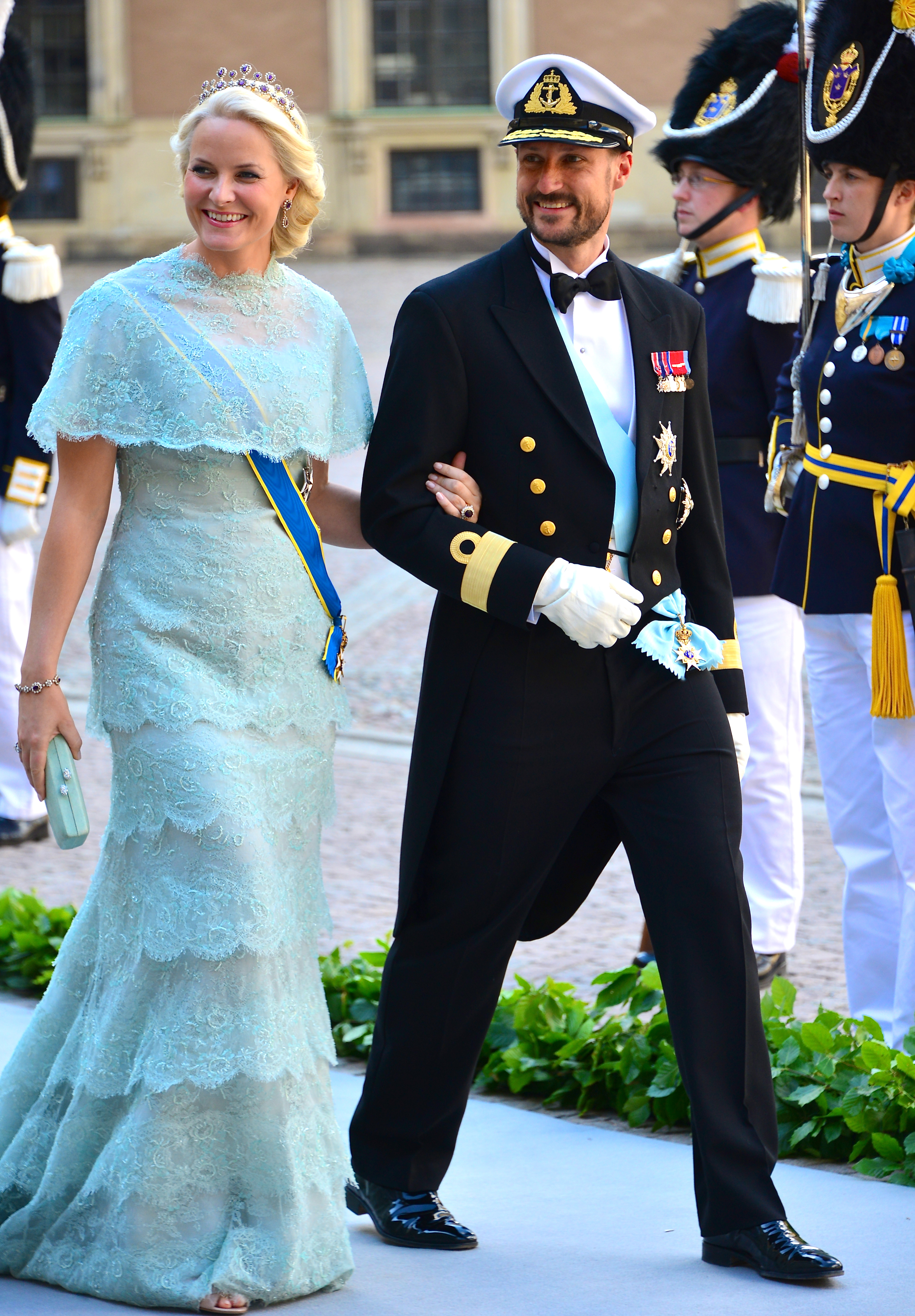
Haakon, Crown Prince of Norway, wearing Norwegian Navy mess dress during the wedding of Princess Madeleine and Christopher O'Neill.

The Norwegian Army has no specific mess uniform, but uses its parade uniform or service uniform as appropriate.

The Royal Norwegian Navy uses a navy blue hooded jacket and waistcoat. As in the Royal Norwegian Air Force, the mess jacket is used with a white waistcoat for gala events.

== Russia and the former USSR ==
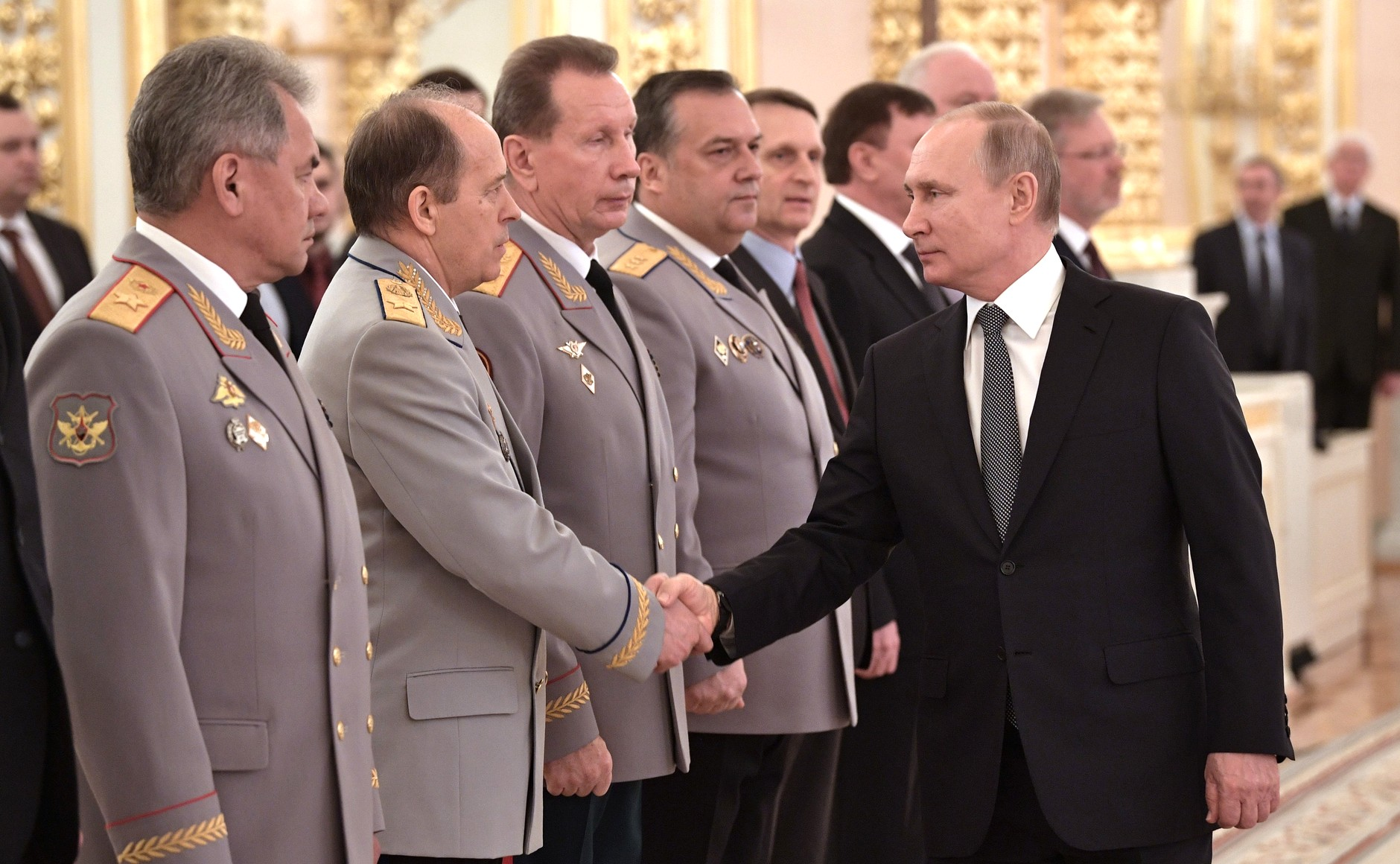
Senior Russian military officers receiving awards from President Putin, 2019.

While officially the Soviet and post-Soviet military forces do not wear mess uniform, a version of it was introduced in July 1969 for senior generals only (Russian: парадно-выходная форма), who wore light-grey tunics on special occasions (mostly reception of state awards). This uniform was abandoned in the 1990s but reintroduced under President Putin, again for senior generals only. The grey tunic uniform should be distinguished from the blue or dark green full-dress parade uniform regularly worn on holidays and ceremonies (Russian: парадная форма).

== Sweden ==
=== Full mess dress ===
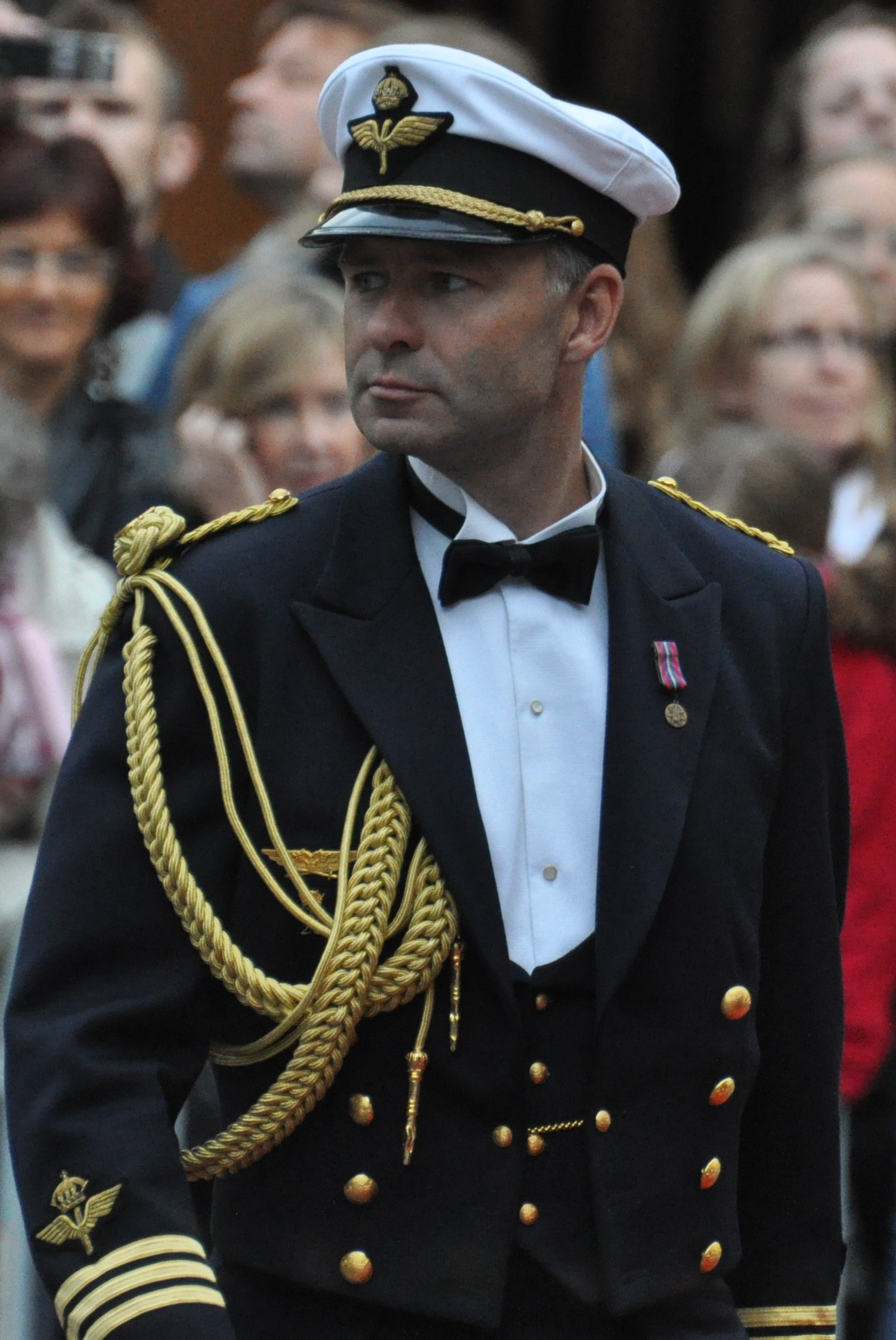
Lesser mess dress uniform for the Swedish Air Force.

Swedish full mess dress (known as stor mässdräkt) is formal wear to be worn on occasions when a civilian would wear white tie or a morning dress. The Swedish Army code for full mess dress is m/86, the navy is m/1878, and the air force m/1938. The numbers represent the year in which the style was introduced. The full mess dress is thus the equivalent of full dress uniform for units which don't have their unit-specific full dress uniform traditions.

The uniforms consist of:

- dark blue mess jacket
- white waistcoat; a white waist sash for female personnel
- dark blue long trousers with piping; dark blue long skirt for female personnel
- dress coat; female personnel wear a white spread-collared, ruffle front blouse
- black bow tie
- dark blue cap (with certain variations between the branches)
- black socks
- black plain-toe, lace-up shoes (patent leather is an option); female personnel wears black ladies' shoes (again with variations)
- white gloves

Additional clothing includes a cloak (akin to the boat coat), galoshes, and a scarf, as well as any medals. With the full mess dress one may also wear braces or a waistcoat in one's branch colours.

=== Lesser mess dress ===
The "lesser" (liten) and "full" (stor) mess dress are two uniforms of the Swedish Armed Forces uniform subgroup of "social uniforms" (sällskapsuniformer). Aside from mess dress, this group also includes "formal wear" and "society wear". The Swedish lesser mess dress is the equivalent of the civilian black tie. It is the same as the British mess undress or the American mess dress blues.

It differs from the full mess dress in a number of ways:

- the waistcoat/waist sash is dark blue; white is permitted if the gathering includes civilians
- there is no piping on the trousers
- black gloves
- shorter skirts are permitted, in combination with brown nylon stockings
- turnover collars are acceptable

Army officers and cadets may replace the blue vest and sash or the lining of a cloak with traditional regimental or branch-specific colours. A sabre may be carried, but is not obligatory.

- Dark red – Artillery and Paratroopers
- Black – Engineer Troops
- Yellow – Infantry and Infantry foot guards
- Royal blue – Cavalry and the Life Guards
- Light red – Anti-aircraft troops
- Black with yellow piping – Armoured Troops
- Green – Signal Troops
- Light blue – Service Troops

Mess dress is a permitted uniform, in that it is allowed to be worn on defined occasions, but possession is not obligatory. There is always a corresponding form of obligatory uniform that may be worn as an alternative (army: m/87 A, navy: m/48, air force: m/87). Full mess dress is thus matched by högtidsdräkt (formal wear) and the lesser mess dress by sällskapsdräkt (society wear). Formal wear is the same as parade dress, when worn at the equivalent of a white tie occasion. "Society wear" is the service dress uniform, when worn to a black-tie occasion. Formal and society wear (rather than mess dress) are the mandatory uniform types for any military event, funeral, parade, state visit, or any other non-festive occasion.

== United Kingdom ==
=== The Royal Household ===
The officers of some ceremonial military corps, such as the Yeomen of the Guard and Gentlemen at Arms, are authorised to wear the evening dress of the Royal Household court uniform as a mess dress.

=== Royal Navy ===
Depiction of No. 2A mess dress for the Royal Navy.

The Royal Navy distinguishes between mess dress, which is now the equivalent of civilian white tie, and mess undress, which is the equivalent of black tie.

Before 1939, there were three forms of evening dress:

- Ball dress (No. 2) – undress tailcoat, gold epaulettes, gold-laced trousers, white waistcoat, black bow tie, cocked hat
- Mess dress (No. 7) – mess jacket, gold-laced trousers, blue waistcoat, black bow tie, peaked cap.
- Mess undress (No. 8) – mess jacket, plain trousers, blue waistcoat, black bow tie, peaked cap.

Today, there are only two forms of evening dress:

- Mess dress (No. 2A) – mess jacket, plain navy blue mess trousers, white waistcoat, black bow tie, peaked cap.
- Mess undress (No. 2B) – mess jacket, plain navy blue mess trousers, blue waistcoat or black cummerbund, black bow tie, peaked cap.

Officers of the rank of captain and above wear gold-laced trousers (the gold lace stripes are nicknamed "lightning conductors"), and may wear the undress tailcoat (without epaulettes), with either mess dress or mess undress. The undress tailcoat is so named to distinguish it from the full dress tailcoat that was worn during the day with full dress (No. 1), which is worn in a modified form by admirals today as ceremonial day dress. Both the undress tailcoat and the mess jacket are double-breasted, with peaked lapels and six gilt buttons, but cut to be worn single-breasted and fastened at the front with two linked gilt buttons. The undress tailcoat is fitted with scallop-flapped hip pockets with three gilt buttons on each pocket. Rank is indicated on the undress tailcoat and mess jacket by gold lace on the sleeves. When tropical rig is ordered, a white, double breasted mess jacket with a shawl collar is worn instead of the blue, with shoulder boards to indicate rank. The peaked cap can (optionally) be worn with both mess undress and mess dress.

Senior rates-Warrant Officers (of both grades), Chief Petty Officers and Petty Officer- may either wear their Number 1 Dress uniform with a bow tie and medal ribbons, or they may optionally wear a navy blue mess jacket with shawl collar that is worn with the black cummerbund and a white Marcella shirt and navy blue mess trousers. The relevant cuff buttons indicating rate are worn by Petty Officers and Chief Petty Officers, and miniature rate badges are worn on the upper left arm of the mess jacket by petty officers, and on the sleeve by both grades of Warrant officers. Miniature medals are also worn. Trade badges are not worn in this rig. In tropical climates, either a white bush jacket (as in number 1 rig) is worn with medal ribbons, or optionally; a white mess jacket similar to that worn by officers is optionally worn, only without shoulderboards.

Mess dress and mess undress are today worn with a soft marcella-fronted shirt with a soft collar. Stiff marcella-fronted shirts and stiff wing collars were previously worn with all forms of evening dress, but were abolished first for mess undress, and finally in the mid-1990s for mess dress. Rear admirals and above may continue to wear the stiff shirt and collar with mess dress. Cummerbunds, which may be worn with mess undress instead of the blue waistcoat and with Red Sea rig (No. 2C), are frequently decorated with badges or colours proper to the ship or establishment in which the officer serves. For example, HMS Glasgow – Black Watch tartan; HMS Illustrious – green with the ship's logo (three crossed trumpets) in gold; Royal Naval Engineering College (RNEC) – engineers' purple with the RNEC lettering in gold. Traditionally, half-Wellington boots were worn with mess dress and mess undress, but today shoes are more common. The optional outer garment worn with evening dress is the boat cloak, which is a knee-length navy blue cloak lined with white silk, with four gilt buttons, and fastened at the neck with two gilt lions' heads joined with a chain. Miniature medals are worn with both mess dress and mess undress, though previously medal ribbons only were worn with mess undress on routine occasions, such as by the officer of the day. Officers who are members of orders of chivalry wear their stars and ribbons as appropriate.

The Elder Brethren of Trinity House are authorised to wear a mess dress based upon that of a Royal Navy captain.

=== British Army ===
Officers'

Other ranks'

British Army No. 10 mess dress (Royal Yorkshire Regiment)

Mess uniforms first appeared in the British Army in about 1845, initially utilizing the short "shell jacket" worn since 1831. This working jacket was worn open over a regimental waistcoat for evening dress. The original purpose was to provide a relatively comfortable and less expensive alternative to the stiff and elaborate full-dress uniforms then worn by officers for evening social functions such as regimental dinners or balls. With the general disappearance of full dress uniforms after World War I, mess dress became the most colourful and traditional uniform to be retained by most officers in British and Commonwealth armies. Immediately after World War II the cheaper "blue patrols" were worn for several years as mess dress, but by 1956 the traditional uniforms had been readopted.

The formal designation of the most commonly worn mess uniform in the British Army is "No. 10 (Temperate) Mess Dress". The form varies according to regiment or corps, but generally a short mess jacket is worn, which either fastens at the neck (being cut away to show the waistcoat, this being traditionally the style worn by cavalry regiments and other mounted corps), or is worn with a white shirt and black bow tie (traditionally the usual style for unmounted regiments, corps, and services). Since regimental amalgamations, the "cut away" or cavalry-style jacket has been adopted by some British Army infantry regiments such as the Royal Regiment of Wales, the Royal Regiment of Fusiliers, and corps such as the Adjutant General's Corps and the Royal Logistic Corps. Officers of the Foot Guards, Royal Engineers, the Parachute Regiment, the Royal Army Medical Corps, and the Royal Regiment of Scotland amongst others still wear the infantry style of jacket.

The colours of mess jackets and trousers reflect those of the traditional full dress uniforms of the regiments in question, as worn until at least 1914. Jackets are, therefore, usually scarlet, dark blue, or rifle green, with collars, cuffs, waistcoats, or lapels in the former facing colours of the regiments in question. In the case of those regiments which have undergone amalgamation, features of the former uniforms are often combined. Waistcoats are often richly embroidered, though with modern modifications, such as a core of cotton for gold cording instead of the thick gold cord which made these items very expensive prior to World War II. Non-commissioned officers' mess dress is usually simpler in design, but in the same colours as officers of their regiment.

Most British Army regiments' mess dress incorporates high-waisted, very tight trousers known as overalls, the bottoms of which buckle under leather Wellington or George boots. Ornamental spurs are usually worn by cavalry regiments and corps that traditionally were mounted; some other regiments and corps prescribe spurs for field officers, since in former times these officers would have been mounted. The Rifles do not wear spurs at any rank, following Light Infantry traditions since historically no Light Infantry officer rode on horseback. Officers and other ranks of The Royal Regiment of Scotland wear kilts or tartan trews, and some wear tartan waistcoats as well.

In "No. 11 Warm Weather Mess Dress", a white drill hip-length jacket is worn with either a waistcoat in the same material or a cummerbund of regimental pattern. Blue and various shades of red or green are the most common colours for the cummerbund. Trousers or overalls are the same as in No. 10 Dress.

Female officers and soldiers wear mess jackets in a pattern similar to those of their male counterparts over dark-coloured ankle-length evening dresses. Black hand bags may be carried, and black evening shoes are worn.

=== Royal Air Force ===
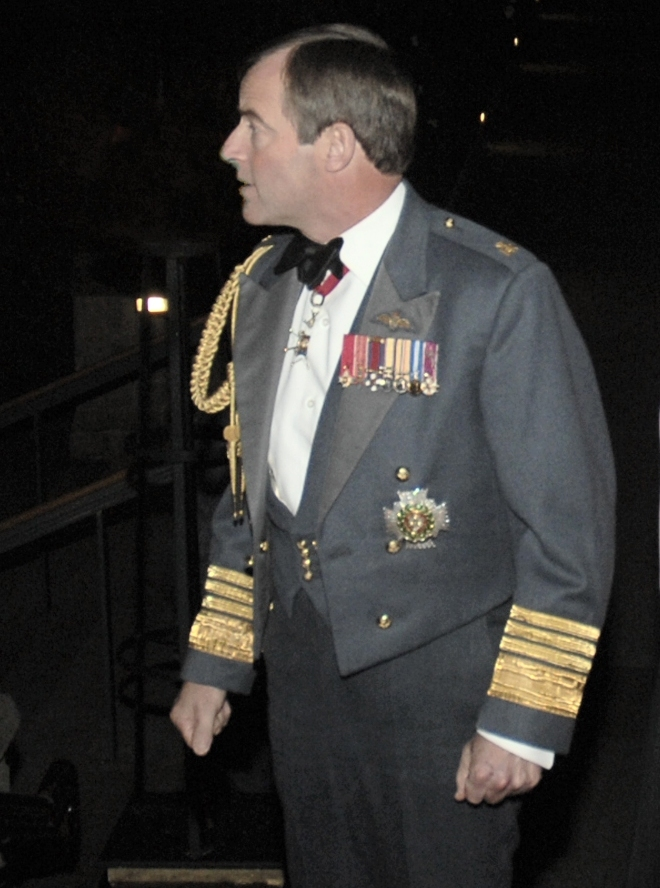
Air Chief Marshal Glenn Torpy of the Royal Air Force wearing No. 5B mess dress.

No. 5 Mess dress in the Royal Air Force is similar to that in the Royal Navy, except that the jacket and trousers are in mid-blue. For the most formal white tie occasions, such as state dinners, court balls and royal evening receptions, a white bow tie is worn with a white waistcoat (No. 5A). For all other evening events, a black bow tie with a mid-blue waistcoat (No. 5B) or a slate grey cummerbund (No. 5) is worn. Cummerbunds of a particular squadron or unit design may also be worn. Among Scottish-based units, a kilt of grey Clan Douglas tartan was initially authorised, but the recently approved official RAF tartan is now authorised. The tartan, designed in 1988, was officially recognised by the Ministry of Defence in 2001. A variation of No. 1 Service Dress (SD) is also permitted; the usual blue shirt and black tie are replaced with a white shirt and black bow tie. This dress is referred to as No. 4 Mess Dress. In warm weather regions, a lightweight white jacket is substituted for the No. 5 mid-blue jacket. This uniform is designated No. 8 mess dress..

For women, mess dress currently consists of the same style high-waisted blue-grey single-breasted jacket and white marcella shirt as men, a small bow tie and cummerbund, and a straight ankle-length blue-gray skirt, worn with patent-leather court shoes and barely-black tights or stockings. Unlike the gentlemen officers' jacket, which has a pointed lapel, the ladies' jacket features a shawl collar. From the 1970s and prior to the introduction of current women's mess dress in 1996, female officers wore a royal blue Empire line dress made of crimplene material with a loose mandarin neck, long sleeves, and an ankle length hem. Rank was indicated on a small enamelled brooch worn near the neck.

=== British police ===
Police officers may wear mess dress to formal dinners if appropriate, but is it most typically worn by officers who have achieved the rank of superintendent or above. The mess dress of the Metropolitan Police is dark blue with black cuffs and a black 'roll' collar having an embroidered badge (Brunswick star) on each lapel. That of the commissioner includes a two-inch oak leaf lace strip on the trousers and a set of aiguillettes. A matching black waistcoat is worn and badges of rank are displayed on the epaulettes.

== United States ==
The use of mess dress in the United States Uniformed Services started in the early 20th century.

=== U.S. Army ===
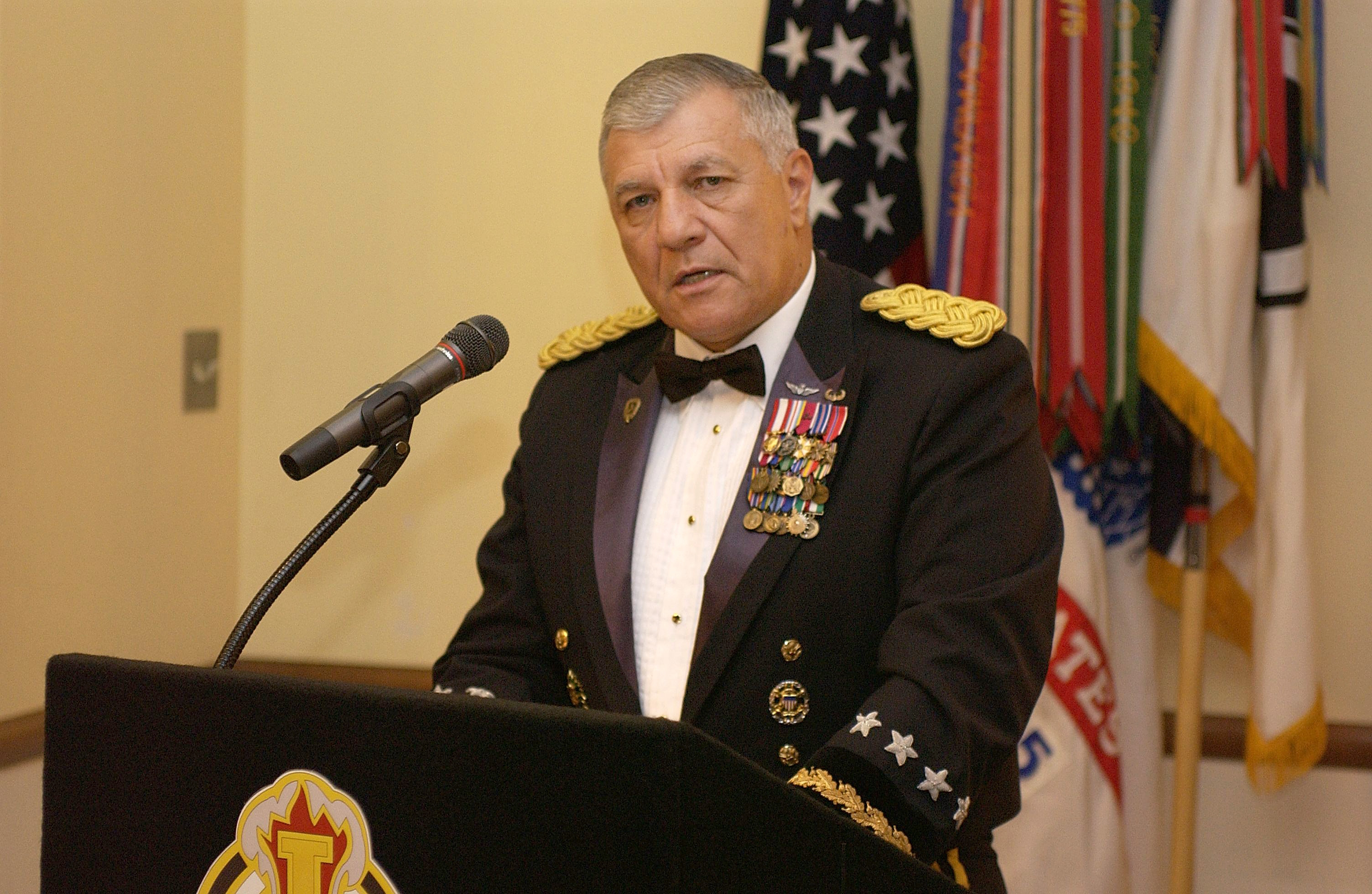
General

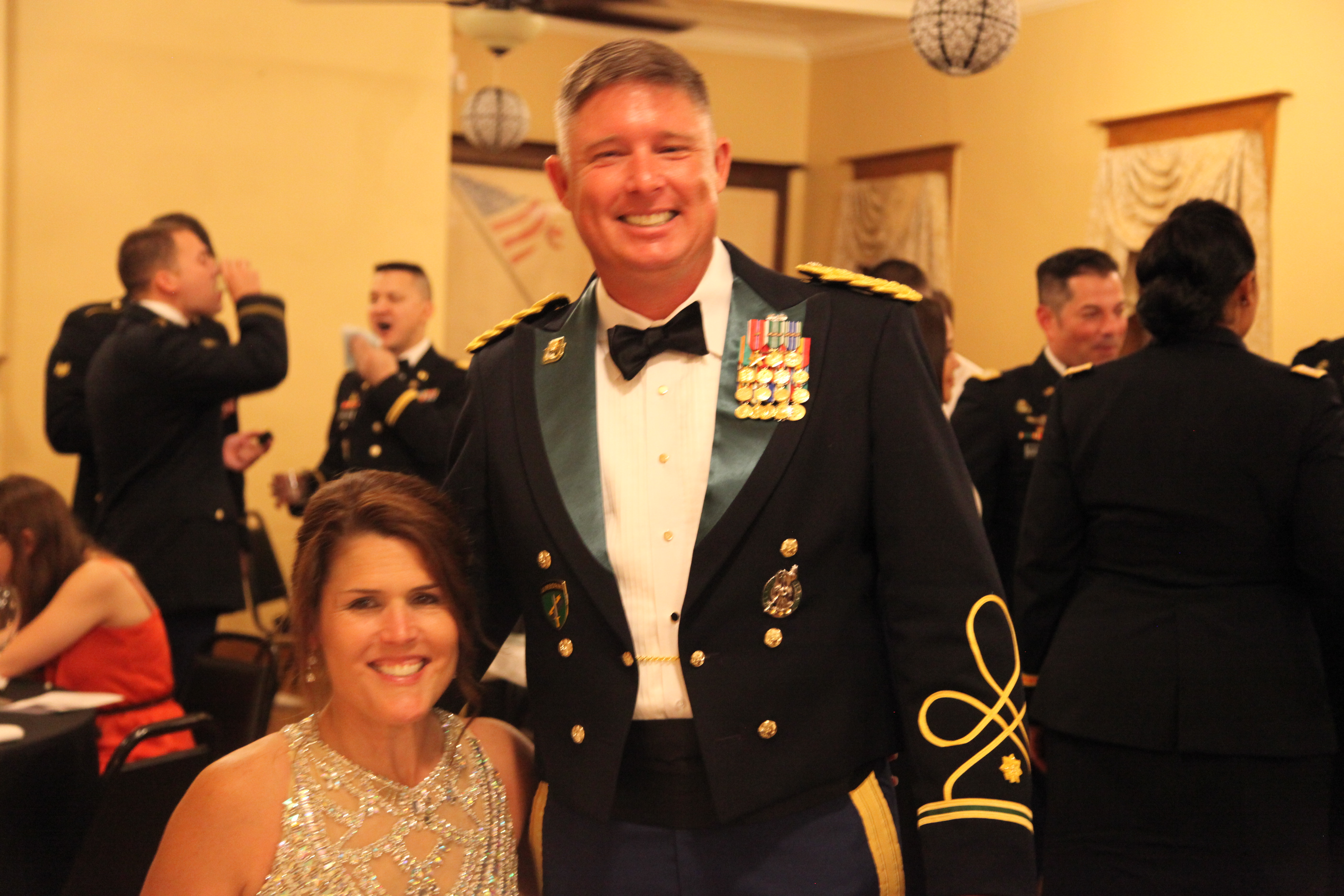
Major

Mess dress for officers of various ranks in the United States Army

In 1902, when the U.S. Army adopted its last standing collar blue uniform for full dress, a modified form of civilian tail coat was also introduced for evening dress, worn with a white tie and vest. This was known as the special uniform for evening wear. At the same time, a mess uniform resembling the British pattern was authorized for less formal evening occasions. The short mess jacket was either dark blue or white, according to climate. After 1911 the blue jacket included lapels in branch color (yellow for cavalry, red for artillery, light blue for infantry, and so on). The individual officer could wear full dress or either of the evening dress alternatives for social functions. In view of the expense involved, it was usually senior officers who appeared in mess or evening dress uniforms. While the blue full dress was worn from 1902 to 1917 by all ranks for ceremonial parades within the continental United States, the two optional evening uniforms were authorized only for officers.

The various blue uniforms ceased to be worn after 1917. However, the white mess uniform for commissioned and warrant officers was authorized again in 1921. In 1928, wearing of the full range of blue dress uniforms was authorized for all ranks, but only when off duty, and at the expense of the individual. In practice, this meant that only the pre-1917 mess uniform, and to a lesser extent the special evening wear, reappeared in significant numbers.

An overview of U.S. Army Air Corps' dress uniforms from 1937.

After World War II, the evening dress and mess dress uniforms were reintroduced, with the tail coat having a single Austrian knot (trefoil) over the branch-of-service color (general officers had stars over an oak leaf braid), with the rank placed in the bottom opening of the knot. The mess jacket, intended for black-tie occasions, used an Austrian knot rank system with the branch insignia at the bottom. The number of knots indicated the officer's rank: five for colonel, four for lieutenant colonel, three for major, two for captain, one for first lieutenant, and none for second lieutenant. This complicated system, which required that the braid be altered with a change of rank, was replaced with the evening coat style in 1972, using a single knot and the rank placed above the branch-of-service color. A white mess jacket for summertime wear was introduced in the 1950s. The "special evening dress" (tails) was finally abolished in 1969, although officers already in possession of this uniform could continue to wear it until 1975. It was replaced by the Army blue mess uniform, which in its modern form closely resembles that of 1911. It is common for soldiers to wear suspenders in their branch color with the army dress uniform trousers, although they are concealed under the coat. The uniform has two variations, the Army blue mess uniform and Army blue evening mess uniform.

The Army blue mess uniform is considered equivalent to black tie, and consists of the mess jacket, trousers, white semiformal dress shirt with a turndown collar, black bow tie, and black cummerbund. The Army blue evening mess uniform is considered equivalent to white tie/tails, and consists of the same jacket and trousers, but with a white formal dress shirt with a wing collar, white single-breasted vest, and white bow tie. There are White versions of both the Blue Mess and Blue evening Mess uniforms. The main difference is the use of a white jacket, and a black pants.

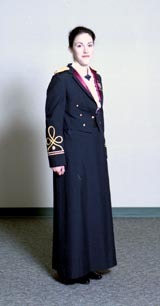
U.S. Army female officer blue mess dress uniform

Miniature medals are suspended on ribbons one half the width of their normal counterparts, and are worn on the left lapel. Exceptions to the miniature medals are the Medal of Honor, the Presidential Medal of Freedom (although the PMF also includes an optional miniature version), and authorized foreign neck-borne decorations (e.g., Knight Commander of Order of the Bath, Commander of the Order of Military Merit, et al.) Individual and unit awards that consist of ribbons only are not worn on the mess uniform. Miniature versions of combat and special skill badges are worn above the miniature medals, along with miniature versions of Ranger and Special Forces shoulder tabs, made of enameled metal. Marksmanship and driver/mechanic badges are not worn on the mess uniform. Regimental distinctive insignia is worn on the right lapel. Identification badges worn on service uniform pockets, such as the Drill Sergeant Identification Badge, Presidential Service Badge, Recruiter Badge, Office of the Joint Chiefs of Staff Identification Badge, et al., are worn between the top and middle buttons on the applicable side of the mess uniform.

The lapels of enlisted mess uniforms are uniformly dark blue, rather than utilizing a branch color. Enlisted rank insignia is worn on the sleeve in the same manner as on the service uniform tunic. Below, on both sleeves, are long service stripes in place of the shorter stripes used on the service uniform. The same longer service stripes were worn on both sleeves of the blue dress uniform tunic until the blue dress uniform was reconfigured to be the Army's service uniform and replace the green service uniform.

=== U.S. Air Force ===
In the 1950s and 1960s, the U.S. Air Force formal uniform consisted of a civilian black tailcoat with added military sleeve braid and rank insignia. It could be worn as either a black tie or white tie combination. Due to the tails, it was not considered a mess dress uniform.

The original U.S. Air Force mess dress consisted of a short black jacket with black trousers, with a white jacket for summer wear. The jackets had satin lapels with matching satin sleeve braid. It entered service in the 1960s and was phased out in the 1980s. It is still sometimes worn by retired officers. The current mess dress is similar in cut and tailoring, but in a dark blue color for year-round wear.

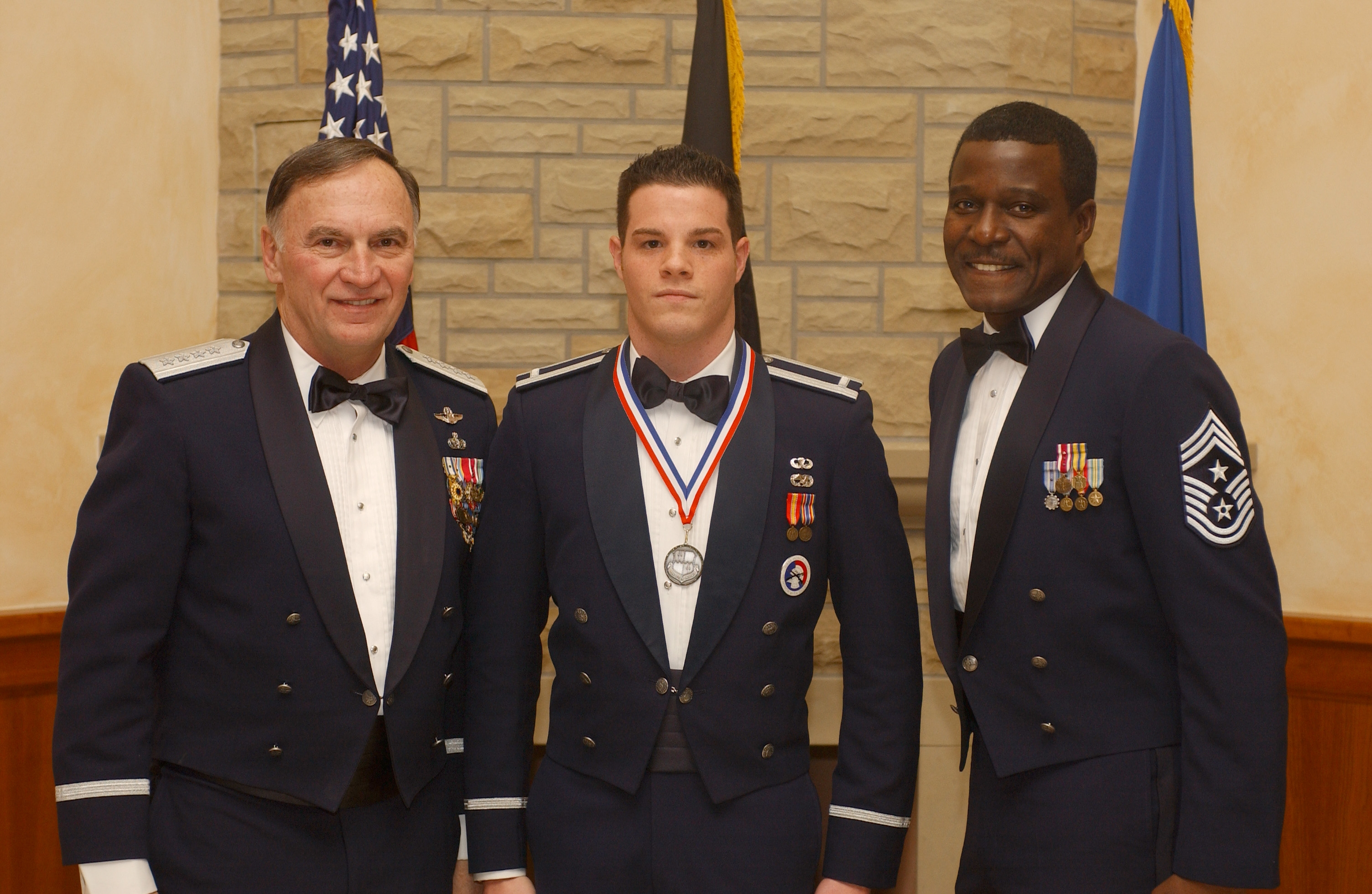
United States Air Force personnel in mess dress uniforms.

The current pattern was introduced in 1981 and is also similar to the Royal Air Force design, except that the coat and trousers are dark blue. Dark blue bow ties and dark blue cummerbunds are used for black-tie affairs, and white bow ties with white waistcoats for white-tie affairs. Silver-trimmed shoulder boards and silver sleeve braid are worn rather than rank braids (enlisted members wear sleeve rank insignia instead of shoulder boards, and no silver sleeve braid), along with silver buttons. No hat is worn. General officers have solid silver shoulder boards and wider silver sleeve braid. Enlisted members also have the option to wear the semi-formal uniform, essentially an issued service dress with a white shirt substituted for the blue shirt, but many non-commissioned officers elect to purchase a mess dress. Women's mess dress uniforms have a long skirt replacing the trousers and delete the button chain clasp for the coat. As of August 2020, females have the option to wear mess dress trousers.

Members of the Civil Air Patrol, the United States Air Force Auxiliary, may wear the U.S. Air Force mess dress uniform with distinctive Civil Air Patrol insignia and trim. The Civil Air Patrol mess dress uniform is identical to the U.S. Air Force mess dress uniform, except that the silver braid on the jacket and officer rank insignia (shoulder boards) of the U.S. Air Force mess dress uniform is replaced with dark blue braid, and a Civil Air Patrol seal device 3" in size (either embroidered in bullion or finished in enamel) is worn in place of the middle button on the right side of the jacket. Members of the Civil Air Patrol NCO corps wear distinctive Civil Air Patrol NCO rank insignia in lieu of U.S. Air Force NCO rank insignia.

Civil Air Patrol cadets do not wear the U.S. Air Force mess dress uniform, but may wear the semi-formal uniform described above for U.S. Air Force enlisted members, consisting of the U.S. Air Force service dress uniform with the name-tag removed and with Civil Air Patrol distinctive insignia, a white dress shirt, and a U.S. Air Force satin blue bow-tie.

Military courtesy and etiquette requirements for these Civil Air Patrol uniform combinations are similar to those of the U.S. Air Force.

=== U.S. Marine Corps ===
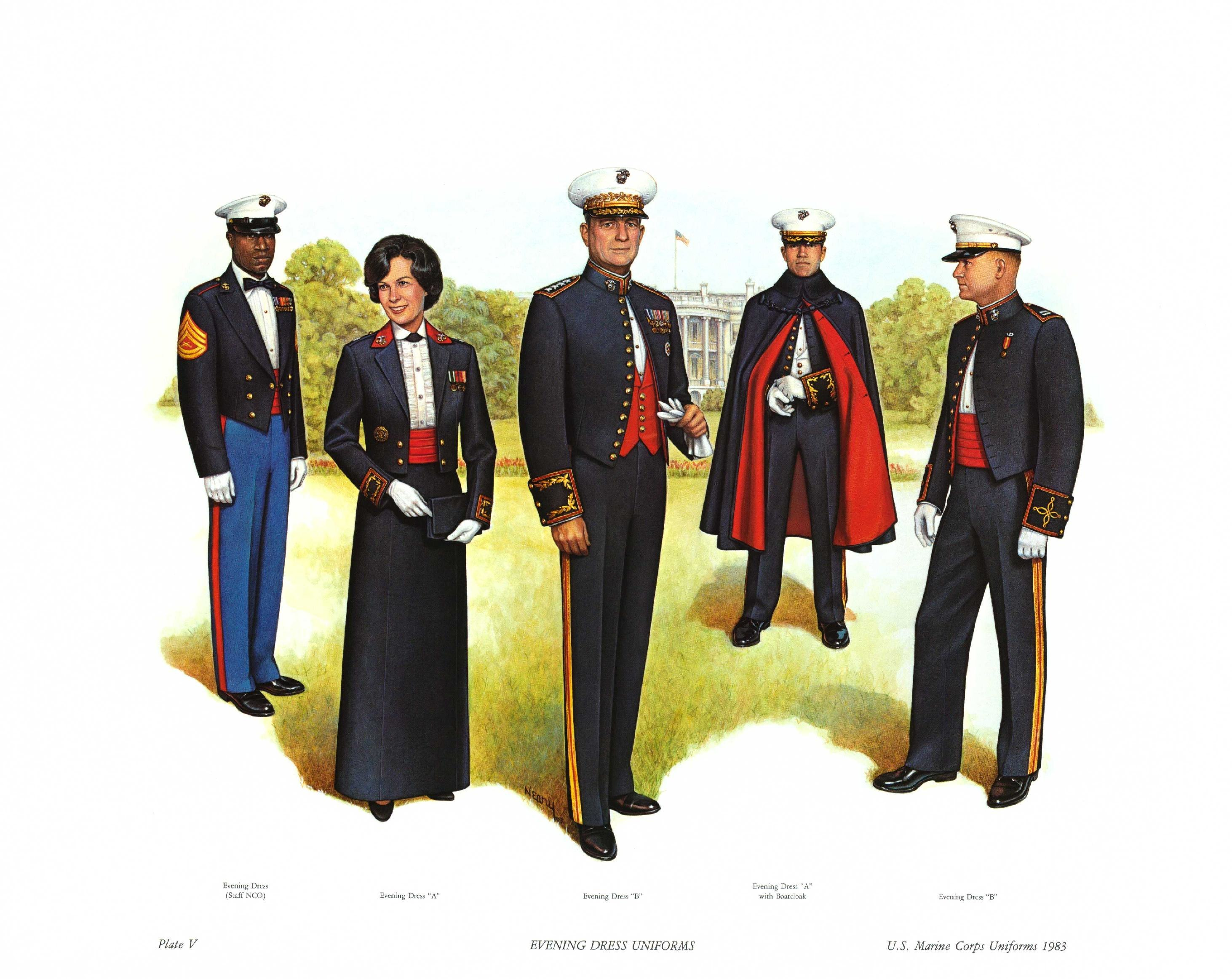
Marines wearing evening dress. The center right male officer is wearing the boat cloak as an outer garment.

The United States Marine Corps mess dress uniforms date from the late 19th century. Mess dress-style uniforms in the USMC are considered the most formal uniform, reserved for officers and staff noncommissioned officers (SNCOs), (pay grades E-6 to E-9, staff sergeant to sergeant major/master gunnery sergeant). NCOs and junior enlisted Marines wear dress blues or Blue Dress "A," as their most formal uniform.

The uniform coat of commissioned and warrant officers is fastened at the neck, similar to that of the dress blue uniform, but is cut away, "cavalry-style", to expose the white dress shirt and scarlet cummerbund (general officers have a scarlet vest with small gold buttons). This version is known as evening dress "B," and is equivalent to formal "black tie" civilian attire. It is worn to formal dances, balls, dinners, and events such as the annual USMC Birthday Ball. Officers (all ranks) may wear, in lieu of the scarlet cummerbund or vest, a white vest for white tie events (known as the evening dress "A" uniform, and equivalent to "white tie" civilian attire for the most formal occasions such as a State Dinner or Presidential Inauguration Ball).

A United States Marine Corps Lieutenant Colonel (left) in evening dress "B" uniform.

Officer rank, in gold or silver wire, is embroidered directly on the shoulder epaulettes, which are bordered with gold wire and scarlet piping. The collar and cuffs are also bordered in gold wire and scarlet, bearing a quatrefoil for warrant officers and company-grade officers, a single row of oak leaves for field officers, and a double row of oak leaves for general officers. The uniform is completed with midnight blue trousers with gold and red stripes. The individual also has the option to wear a boat cloak of dark blue broadcloth material lined with scarlet wool (for male officers and SNCOs) or an optional dress cape of dark blue polyester-wool tropical material lined with scarlet satin rayon cloth (for female officers and SNCOs).

Staff noncommissioned officers wear a double-breasted evening dress uniform similar to that of US Navy officers, with high waist dress blue trousers with blood stripe, scarlet cummerbund, and black bow tie. The jacket is cut so as to have no overlap, but with the sides clasped together. The grade chevrons are in the style of the 1890s, larger than the service or dress blue USMC enlisted grade chevrons, worn on each sleeve of the jacket. A white cummerbund with a white bow tie is authorized (for white tie events) for SNCO's.

A summer white mess dress (see link for pictures of the obsolete uniforms), similar in design to U.S. Navy and U.S. Coast Guard uniforms, but with shoulder epaulettes instead of rank boards, was worn until the mid-1990s when it was phased out.

=== U.S. Navy, Coast Guard, Merchant Marine and others ===
Officers and chief petty officers of the U.S. Navy, U.S. Coast Guard, United States Public Health Service Commissioned Corps, NOAA Corps, and Merchant Marine use the same mess uniform, referred to as "dinner dress". There are three styles of this uniform—dinner dress, dinner dress jacket, and tropical dinner dress.

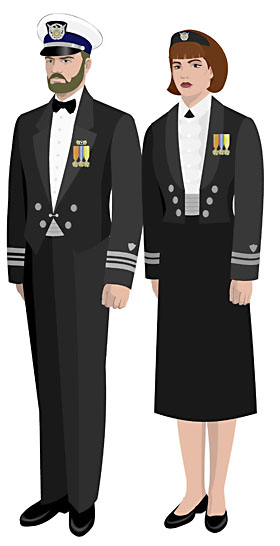
Blue jacket

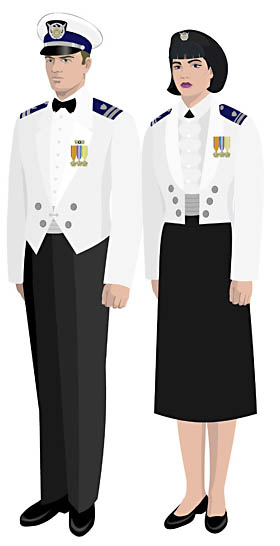
White jacket

Mess uniforms of the United States Coast Guard Auxiliary

Dinner dress uniforms, blue and white, are modifications of service dress blue or service dress white uniforms, with the service ribbons and breast insignia replaced by miniature medals and miniature breast insignia. Additionally, officers and chief petty officers wear an evening shirt and black bow tie with dinner dress blue.

Dinner dress blue jacket and dinner dress white jacket consist of a black waist-length jacket with gold buttons (officer) or silver buttons (petty officer first class and below). The jacket is double-breasted, but does not overlap, and is held with a clasp. (This, in contrast to double-breasted civilian evening jackets, which are worn fully open, or double-breasted smoking jackets which are worn fully overlapped and buttoned). Bullion or imitation bullion rank stripes are worn on the sleeves of the officers' blue jacket, and a rating badge and service stripes are worn by enlisted personnel. On the officers' dinner dress white jacket, hard shoulder boards are worn. A gold cummerbund is worn by officers and chief petty officers, and a black one by petty officers first class and below. Shirt studs and cuff links are gold for officers and chiefs and silver for petty officers first class and below. A hat or cap is not required with dinner dress jacket uniforms, but may be worn. For both genders, it must be worn with an outer garment, which is traditionally the boat cloak for males and cape for females. Females do not need to remove headgear indoors when wearing the tiara. The boat cloak, tiara, and cape, all being optional items, are very rarely seen.

Tropical dinner dress blue incorporates dinner dress blue trousers, summer white (short sleeve) shirt, an appropriate cummerbund, and miniature medals and breast insignia.

An additional uniform, formal dress (white tie), is optional for all commissioned officers, but may be prescribed for captains and above. This uniform is worn as an equivalent to civilian white tie dress. It is almost identical to the dinner dress blue jacket, except a wing collar shirt, white waistcoat, and white tie are worn. A formal blue tailcoat may also be prescribed.

Members of the U.S. Coast Guard Auxiliary wear the same dinner dress uniforms as the U.S. Navy and U.S. Coast Guard, but with a silver cummerbund and silver Coast Guard Auxiliary officer insignia in place of the gold insignia. Petty officers and below may, at their option, wear this same uniform, but with a black cummerbund and silver buttons.

== International organizations ==
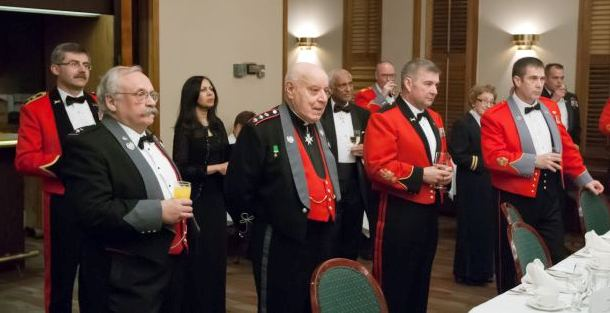
Two St. John Ambulance Canada officers in mess dress (black mess jacket, red vest), alongside Canadian Army personnel in mess dress.

Various international organizations and civilian groups also use a form of mess dress. Several national first aid organization under the St John Ambulance umbrella use mess uniforms as a part of the national uniform dress. Each mess uniform varies from nation to nation; however, it generally reflects the colours of St John, being Black, silver (white or grey) and red. The organization's cut and style, as well as accoutrements generally follow British military style.

== See also ==
- Military uniform
  - Full dress uniform
  - Mess dress uniform
    - Red Sea rig
  - Service dress uniform
  - Combat uniform
- Semi-formal wear
  - Black lounge suit
  - Black tie
