= Territory rig =

Australian dress code

Territory Rig is the style of dress which men adopt in the Northern Territory on official occasions, comprising long trousers, shirt and tie.

Territory Rig is also sometimes called Darwin Rig.

The expression has expanded to be used as a formal dress code for both men and women. The Northern Territory Government officially defines Territory Rig for gentlemen as trousers, long sleeved-shirt and tie, and for ladies as day dress/after five.

== See also ==
- Red Sea rig
