= Semi-formal wear =

Subset of clothing

Semi-formal wear or half dress is a grouping of dress codes indicating the sort of clothes worn to events with a level of formality between informal wear and formal wear. The traditional interpretation for men is black tie for evening wear and black lounge suit for day wear, corresponded by either a pant suit or an evening gown for women.

Whether one would choose to wear morning or evening semi-formal has traditionally been defined by whether the event will commence before or after 6:00 p.m.

In addition, equivalent versions may be permitted such as ceremonial dresses (including court dress, diplomatic uniforms and academic dress), religious clothing, national costumes, and military mess dress.

In more colloquial, modern formulations, semi-formal has been defined closer to what is traditionally considered "informal wear".

== Evening wear: "black tie" dinner suit ==
For evening wear (after 6 p.m.), the code is black tie. In formal evening dress, or white tie dress, this practice of substituting colors in ties is much less common since men's fashion tends to follow tradition more deeply as it becomes more formal.

The origins of evening semi-formal attire date back to the later 19th century when Edward, Prince of Wales (subsequently Edward VII), wanted a more comfortable dinner attire than the swallowtail coat.

In spring 1886, the Prince invited James Potter, a rich New Yorker, and his wife Cora to Sandringham House, the Prince's hunting estate in Norfolk. When Potter asked for the Prince's dinner dress code, the Prince sent him to his tailor, Henry Poole & Co., in London, where he was given a suit made to the Prince's specifications with the dinner jacket.

On returning to Tuxedo Park, New York, in 1886, Potter's dinner suit proved popular at the Tuxedo Park Club. Not long afterward, when a group of men from the club chose to wear such suits to a dinner at Delmonico's Restaurant in New York City, other diners were surprised. They were told that such clothing was popular at Tuxedo Park, so the particular cut then became known as the "tuxedo".

From its creation into the 1920s, this dinner jacket was considered appropriate dress for dining in one's home or club, while the tailcoat remained in place as appropriate for public appearance.

== See also ==
- Western dress codes
- Suit
- Informal wear
- Formal wear
- Casual wear
- Mess dress
- Red Sea rig
