= British business group =

A British Business Group (BBG) is an association or club of expatriate British business people. The aims of the group are typically to encourage trade with the host country and to provide a social environment for business networking. Typically a BBG will organize trade missions, lectures and social functions. Many BBGs fulfill a charitable role, although that is not a primary function.

BBGs are often closely associated with the local British consulate or embassy, and with related organizations, such as the Middle East Association or the UKTI.

== List of Typical British Business Groups ==
- United States
- Abu Dhabi
- Bangladesh
- Dubai & Northern Emirates
- Greece, British and Commonwealth Business and Professional Group of Thessaloniki
- Jeddah, Saudi Arabia
- Libya
- Macedonia
- Chennai, India
- Vietnam
- Oman
- Bahrain
- Tanzania
- Goa, India
- Gujarat, India
- Pune, India
- Azerbaijan
- Bangalore, India
